= List of Ekspress satellites =

Ekspress (Russian: Экспресс, literally Express) is a communication and broadcasting system developed and operated by Russian Satellite Communications Company (RSCC). It is the largest network of Russia and its slots cover an arc in geostationary orbit from 14.0° West to 145.0° East. This allows it to cover the whole territory of Russia, the CIS, Europe, the Middle East, Africa, the Asia-Pacific region, North and South America, and Australia.

The only other Russian civilian satellite operator is Gazprom Space Systems with its Yamal constellation.

== Ekspress satellite series ==
While the Ekspress constellation started with a single model, during the years it has used many suppliers and many models.

Satellite	Bus	Payload	Order	Launch	Launch Vehicle	Intended Orbit	Launch Result	Launch Weight	Status	Remarks
Ekspress-1; Ekspress-2 (No.11L)	MSS-2500-GSO (MSS-740)			13 October 1994	Proton-K / Blok DM-2M		Success	2,500 kg (5,500 lb)	Retired	
Ekspress-2; Ekspress-6 (No.12L)	MSS-2500-GSO (MSS-740)			26 September 1996	Proton-K / Blok DM-2M		Success	2,500 kg (5,500 lb)	Retired	
Ekspress-A1; Ekspress-6A (No.1)	MSS-2500-GSO (MSS-740)	Alcatel Space		27 October 1999	Proton-K / Blok DM-2		Failure	2,500 kg (5,500 lb)	Lost on launch	
Ekspress-A2; Ekspress-6A (No.2)	MSS-2500-GSO (MSS-740)	Alcatel Space		12 March 2000	Proton-K / Blok DM-2M		Success	2,500 kg (5,500 lb)	Retired	
Ekspress-A3; Ekspress-3A (No.3)	MSS-2500-GSO (MSS-740)	Alcatel Space		2000-06-23	Proton-K / Blok DM-2		Success	2,500 kg (5,500 lb)	Retired	
Ekspress-A4; Ekspress-A1R (No.4)	MSS-2500-GSO (MSS-740)	Alcatel Space		2002-06-10	Proton-K / Blok DM-2M		Success	2,500 kg (5,500 lb)	Retired in January 2020	
Ekspress-AM22; SESAT-2	MSS-2500-GSO (MSS-767)	Alcatel Space		2003-12-28	Proton-K / Blok DM-2M		Success	2,542 kg (5,604 lb)	Retired in January 2019	
Ekspress-AM11	MSS-2500-GSO (MSS-767)	Alcatel Space		2004-04-26	Proton-K / Blok DM-2M		Success	2,542 kg (5,604 lb)	Retired on 28 March 2006	Debris punctured the pressure vessel on 28 March 2006, put on a graveyard orbit.
Ekspress-AM1	MSS-2500-GSO (MSS-767)	NEC and Toshiba		29 October 2004	Proton-K / Blok DM-2M		Success	2,542 kg (5,604 lb)	Decommissioned on 10 August 2013	
Ekspress-AM2	MSS-2500-GSO (MSS-767)	Alcatel Space		29 March 2005	Proton-K / Blok DM-2M		Success	2,542 kg (5,604 lb)	Retired in 2016	
Ekspress-AM3	MSS-2500-GSO (MSS-767)	Alcatel Space		2005-06-24	Proton-K / Blok DM-2		Success	2,542 kg (5,604 lb)	Operational 140° East	
Ekspress-AM33	MSS-2500-GSO (MSS-767)	Alcatel Space		2008-01-28	Proton-M / Briz-M		Success	2,560 kg (5,640 lb)	Operational 96.5° East	
Ekspress-AM44	MSS-2500-GSO (MSS-767)	Alcatel Space		2009-02-11	Proton-M / Briz-M	GTO	Success	2,560 kg (5,640 lb)	Operational 11° West	Launched with Ekspress MD1.
Ekspress-MD1	Yakhta	Thales Alenia Space		2009-02-11	Proton-M / Briz-M	GTO	Success	1,140 kg (2,510 lb)	Failed 4 July 2013	Launched with Ekspress AM44. Satellite experienced technical failure on 4 July 2013.
Ekspress-AM4	Eurostar-3000			2011-08-17	Proton-M / Briz-M	GTO	Partial failure	5,775 kg (12,732 lb)	Deorbited in March 2012	Stranded in useless orbit. Deorbited in March 2012.
Ekspress-MD2	Yakhta	Thales Alenia Space		2012-08-06	Proton-M / Briz-M	GEO	Partial failure	1,140 kg (2,510 lb)	Lost on launch	Launched with Telkom 3. Stranded in useless orbit.
Ekspress-AM5	Ekspress-2000	MDA		2013-12-26	Proton-M / Briz-M	GEO	Success	3,358 kg (7,403 lb)	Operational 140° East	
Ekspress-AT1	Ekspress-1000H	Thales Alenia Space		2014-03-15	Proton-M / Briz-M	GEO	Success	1,726 kg (3,805 lb)	Failed March 2026	Launched with Ekspress-AT2. Lost in orbit March 2026.
Ekspress-AT2	Ekspress-1000K	Thales Alenia Space		2014-03-15	Proton-M / Briz-M	GEO	Success	1,427 kg (3,146 lb)	Operational 140.0° East	Launched with Ekspress-AT1.
Ekspress-AM4R	Eurostar-3000			2014-05-15	Proton-M / Briz-M	GTO	Failure	5,775 kg (12,732 lb)	Lost on launch	
Ekspress-AM6	Ekspress-2000	MDA		2014-10-21	Proton-M / Briz-M	GEO	Partial success	3,358 kg (7,403 lb)	Operational 53.0° East	Left in lower than intended orbit. Company claimed success.
Ekspress-AM7	Eurostar-3000			2015-03-18	Proton-M / Briz-M	GTO	Success	5,720 kg (12,610 lb)	Operational 40.0° East	
Ekspress-AM8	Ekspress-1000H	Thales Alenia Space		2015-09-14	Proton-M / Blok DM-03	GEO	Success	2,100 kg (4,600 lb)	Operational 14.0° West	
Ekspress-AMU1	Eurostar-3000	Airbus Defence and Space		2015-12-24	Proton-M / Briz-M	GEO	Success	5,700 kg (12,600 lb)	Operational 36.0° East	
Ekspress-103	Ekspress-1000H	Thales Alenia Space	2016	30 July 2020	Proton-M / Briz-M	GEO	Success	2,050 kg (4,520 lb)	Operational 96.5° East	
Ekspress-80	Ekspress-1000H	Thales Alenia Space	2016	30 July 2020	Proton-M / Briz-M	GEO	Success	1,947 kg (4,292 lb)	Operational 80.0° East	
Ekspress-AMU3	Ekspress-1000N	Thales Alenia Space		13 December 2021	Proton-M / Briz-M	GEO	Success	2,150 kg (4,740 lb)	Operational 103.0° East	Launched with Ekspress-AMU7. Will replace Ekspress-AM33.
Ekspress-AMU7	Ekspress-1000N	Thales Alenia Space		13 December 2021	Proton-M / Briz-M	GEO	Success	1,980 kg (4,370 lb)	Operational 145.0° East	Launched with Ekspress-AMU3. Will replace Ekspress-A4.
Ekspress-RV1	Ekspress			2024		HEO	Planned		Planned	Launching into a highly elliptical orbit to cover the Far North region.
Ekspress-RV2	Ekspress			2024		HEO	Planned		Planned	Launching into a highly elliptical orbit to cover the Far North region.
Ekspress-RV3	Ekspress			2024		HEO	Planned		Planned	Launching into a highly elliptical orbit to cover the Far North region.
Ekspress-RV4	Ekspress			2024		HEO	Planned		Planned	Launching into a highly elliptical orbit to cover the Far North region.
Ekspress-AMU5	Ekspress			2025		GEO	Planned		Planned 140.0° East	Will replace Ekspress-AM5.
Ekspress-AMU4	Ekspress-1000			2026	Proton-M / Briz-M	GEO	Planned		Planned 11.0° West	Will replace Ekspress-AM44.
Ekspress-AMU6	Ekspress			2026		GEO	Planned		Planned 53.0° East	Will replace Ekspress-AM6.
Ekspress-AT3	Ekspress			2027		GEO	Planned		Planned 56.0° East	Will replace Ekspress-AT1.
Ekspress-AT4	Ekspress			2027		GEO	Planned		Planned 140.0° East	Will replace Ekspress-AT2.
Ekspress-40	Ekspress			2028		GEO	Planned		Planned 40.0° East	Will replace Ekspress-AM7.
Ekspress-36	Ekspress			2029		GEO	Planned		Planned 36.0° East	Will replace Ekspress-AMU1.
Ekspress-AMU8	Ekspress			2030		GEO	Planned		Planned 14.0° West	Will replace Ekspress-AM8.

== See also ==
- Telecommunications in Russia
- Russian Satellite Communications Company – Satellite communication company of the Ministry of Telecom and Mass Communications of the Russian Federation and owner of the Ekspress satellite series.
- Gazprom Space Systems – Satellite communication division of the Russian oil giant Gazprom and owner of the Yamal system and the only other Russian satellite operator.
- Yamal (satellite constellation) – The only other Russian civilian communications satellite constellation.
