= Ekspress-AM44 =

Russian communications satellite

- Names: Экспресс-АМ44; Ekspress-AM44; Express-AM44
- Mission type: Communications
- Operator: Russian Satellite Communications Company (RSCC)
- COSPAR ID: 2009-007A
- SATCAT no.: 33595
- Website: eng.rscc.ru
- Mission duration: 10 years (planned); 16 years, 1 month and 14 days (in progress)

Spacecraft properties
- Spacecraft: Ekspress-AM44
- Spacecraft type: KAUR
- Bus: MSS-2500-GSO
- Manufacturer: NPO PM (bus); Thales Alenia Space (payload)
- Launch mass: 2,560 kg (5,640 lb)
- Dry mass: 590 kg (1,300 lb)
- Power: 4410 watts

Start of mission
- Launch date: 11 February 2009, 00:03:00 UTC
- Rocket: Proton-M / Briz-M
- Launch site: Baikonur, Site 200/39
- Contractor: Khrunichev State Research and Production Space Center
- Entered service: April 2009

Orbital parameters
- Reference system: Geocentric orbit
- Regime: Geostationary orbit
- Longitude: 11° West (2009–present)

Transponders
- Band: 17 transponders: 10 C-band; 6 Ku-band; 1 L-band
- Coverage area: Russia

Ekspress-AM44 (Russian: Экспресс-АМ44, meaning Express-AM44) is a Russian domestic communications satellite. It belongs to the Russian Satellite Communications Company (RSCC) based in Moscow, Russia. To provide of communications services (digital television, telephony, videoconferencing, data transmission, the Internet access, presidential and governmental mobile communications) and to deploy satellite networks by applying Very-small-aperture terminal (VSAT) technology to Russia.

== Satellite description ==
The satellite has a total of 17 transponders, was 10 C-band, 6 Ku-band and 1 L-band transponders. The Ekspress-AM44 Russian domestic communications satellite, built by Information Satellite Systems Reshetnev (NPO PM) for Kosmicheskaya Svyaz. The communications payload was built by the French company Thales Alenia Space.

== Launch ==
Ekspress-AM44 was launched by Khrunichev State Research and Production Space Center, using a Proton-M / Briz-M launch vehicle. The launch took place at 00:03:00 UTC on 11 February 2009, from Site 200/39 at Baikonur Cosmodrome, Kazakhstan. Successfully deployed into geostationary transfer orbit (GTO), Ekspress-AM44 raised itself into an operational geostationary orbit using its apogee motor.

== Mission ==
Express-AM44 was launched into orbit on 11 February 2009. The commercial operation of the satellite started in April 2009. The Ekspress-103 satellite entered in service at orbital position 11° West on 25 March 2021, where it replaced Ekspress-AM44.
