= Ekspress-AMU1 =

Russian communications satellite

- Names: Экспресс-АМУ1; Express-AMU1 (2015–present); Eutelsat 36C (2015–present)
- Mission type: Communications
- Operator: Russian Satellite Communications Company (RSCC)
- COSPAR ID: 2015-082A
- SATCAT no.: 41191
- Website: eng.rscc.ru
- Mission duration: 15 years (planned); 9 years, 11 months and 24 days (in progress)

Spacecraft properties
- Spacecraft: Ekspress-AMU1
- Spacecraft type: Eurostar
- Bus: Eurostar-3000
- Manufacturer: EADS Astrium
- Launch mass: 5,892 kg (12,990 lb)
- Power: 15 kW

Start of mission
- Launch date: 24 December 2015, 21:31:19 UTC
- Rocket: Proton-M / Briz-M
- Launch site: Baikonur, Site 200/39
- Contractor: Khrunichev State Research and Production Space Center
- Entered service: 10 February 2016

Orbital parameters
- Reference system: Geocentric orbit
- Regime: Geostationary orbit
- Longitude: 36° East (2015–present)

Transponders
- Band: 70 transponders: 60 Ku-band; 10 Ka-band
- Coverage area: Russia, Sub-Saharan Africa

Ekspress-AMU1 (Russian: Экспресс-АМУ1), also known as Eutelsat 36C, is a geostationary communications satellite operated by Russian Satellite Communications Company (RSCC) and designed and manufactured by Airbus Defence and Space on the Eurostar-3000 satellite bus for its Ekspress constellation. It massed 5,892 kg (12,990 lb) at launch, had a power production capacity of 15 kW and a 15-year design life. Its payload is composed of 61 Ku-band and 10 Ka-band transponders.

== Eutelsat 36C ==
Eutelsat leased much of its capacity broadcasting and Internet service provider for Russia and Sub-Saharan Africa, and positioned it in the 36° East under the Eutelsat 36C designation. It is part of the Ekspress constellation of RSCC.

== History ==
On 2 November 2012, Russian Satellite Communications Company (RSCC) and EUTELSAT announced a 15-year agreement to lease capacity on two satellites to be launched in 2013 and 2015. It would be used for broadcasting and IP services and was valued at 300 million euro. The first satellite was Ekspress-AT2, already on order, and the second was Ekspress-AMU1, which construction was to be bid later that year.

During 2012, RSCC organized a competition among EADS Astrium (later Airbus Defense and Space), Thales Alenia Space, MacDonald, Dettwiler and Associates (MDA) and JSC Information Satellite Systems (ISS Reshetnev) to build Ekspress-AMU1. EUTELSAT participated from the selection committee since they intended to lease capacity on board the satellite.

In May 2013, Airbus announced that it had been awarded a contract by RSCC to build Ekspress-AMU1. Also known as EUTELSAT 36C, it would be the follow-up of Eutelsat 36A at the 36° East. Based on the Eurostar-3000 it would mass around 5,892 kg (12,990 lb) at launch, have an end of life power production of 15 kW and a design life of 15 years. It was expected to be launched by a Proton-M in 2015. Airbus bid, while slightly more expensive than Thales, promised to deliver the satellite seven months earlier.

== Launch ==
By early 2015, the satellite was planned for a September or October 2015 launch, but the satellite was delivered to the launch site in Baikonur on 12 November 2015. The launch was then set for 23 December 2015, but weather conditions required a day delay. On 24 December 2015, at 21:31:19 UTC, a Proton-M / Briz-M successfully launched from Site 200/39.

== Mission ==
On 1 January 2016, RSCC announced that Ekspress-AMU1 had reached the geostationary orbit. On 10 February 2016, signals from EUTELSAT 36A were switched to Ekspress-AMU1 marking the final commissioning of the satellite into service.
