= Ekspress-AM33 =

Russian communications satellite

- Names: Экспресс-АМ33; Ekspress-AM33; Express-AM33
- Mission type: Communications
- Operator: Russian Satellite Communications Company (RSCC)
- COSPAR ID: 2008-003A
- SATCAT no.: 32478
- Website: eng.rscc.ru
- Mission duration: 10-12 years (planned); 17 years, 1 month and 25 days (in progress)

Spacecraft properties
- Spacecraft: Ekspress-AM33
- Spacecraft type: KAUR
- Bus: MSS-2500-GSO
- Manufacturer: NPO PM (bus); Thales Alenia Space (payload)
- Launch mass: 2,600 kg (5,700 lb)
- Dry mass: 605 kg (1,334 lb)
- Power: 4410 watts

Start of mission
- Launch date: 28 January 2008, 00:18:00 UTC
- Rocket: Proton-M / Briz-M
- Launch site: Baikonur, Site 200/39
- Contractor: Khrunichev State Research and Production Space Center
- Entered service: 14 April 2008

Orbital parameters
- Reference system: Geocentric orbit
- Regime: Geostationary orbit
- Longitude: 96.5° East (2008–present)

Transponders
- Band: 17 transponders: 10 C-band; 6 Ku-band; 1 L-band
- Coverage area: Russia, Kazakhstan, Mongolia, China, Middle East

Ekspress-AM33 (Russian: Экспресс-АМ33, meaning Express-AM33) is a Russian domestic communications satellite. It belongs to the Russian Satellite Communications Company (RSCC) based in Moscow, Russia. To provide of communications services (digital television, telephony, videoconferencing, data transmission, the Internet access, presidential and governmental mobile communications) and to deploy satellite networks by applying Very-small-aperture terminal (VSAT) technology to Russia, Kazakhstan, Mongolia, China, and the Middle East.

== Satellite description ==
The satellite has a total of 17 transponders, was 10 C-band, 6 Ku-band and 1 L-band transponders. The Ekspress-AM33 Russian domestic communications satellite, built by Information Satellite Systems Reshetnev (NPO PM) for Kosmicheskaya Svyaz. The communications payload was built by the French company Thales Alenia Space.

== Launch ==
Ekspress-AM33 was launched by Khrunichev State Research and Production Space Center, using a Proton-M / Briz-M launch vehicle. The launch took place at 00:18:00 UTC on 28 January 2008, from Site 200/39 at Baikonur Cosmodrome, Kazakhstan. Successfully deployed into geostationary transfer orbit (GTO), Ekspress-AM33 raised itself into an operational geostationary orbit using its apogee motor.

== Mission ==
Express-AM33 was launched into orbit on 28 January 2008. The commercial operation of the satellite started on 14 April 2008. The Ekspress-103 satellite entered in service at orbital position 96.5° East on 25 March 2021, where it replaced Ekspress-AM33.
