= Ekspress-103 =

Russian communications satellite

- Names: Экспресс-103; Express-103
- Mission type: Communications
- Operator: RSCC Space Communications (RSCC)
- COSPAR ID: 2020-053A
- SATCAT no.: 45985
- Website: eng.rscc.ru
- Mission duration: 15 years (planned); 5 years, 2 months and 7 days (in progress)

Spacecraft properties
- Spacecraft: Ekspress-103
- Spacecraft type: Ekspress
- Bus: Ekspress-1000H
- Manufacturer: ISS Reshetnev (bus); Thales Alenia Space (payload)
- Launch mass: 2,050 kg (4,520 lb)
- Dry mass: 512 kg (1,129 lb)
- Power: 6.300 kW

Start of mission
- Launch date: 30 July 2020, 21:25:19 UTC
- Rocket: Proton-M / Briz-M
- Launch site: Baikonur, Site 200/39
- Contractor: Khrunichev State Research and Production Space Center
- Entered service: 25 March 2021

Orbital parameters
- Reference system: Geocentric orbit
- Regime: Geostationary orbit
- Longitude: 96.5° East (2020–present)

Transponders
- Band: 37 transponders: 16 C-band; 20 Ku-band; 1 L-band
- Coverage area: Russia, Southeast Asia

Ekspress-103 (Russian: Экспресс-103 meaning Express-103) is a Russian communications satellite which was launched in 2020. Part of the Ekspress series of geostationary communications satellites, it is owned and operated by the RSCC Space Communications.

== Description ==
Thales Alenia Space, constructed Ekspress-103 payload, and ISS Reshetnev constructed the satellite bus which was based on the Ekspress-1000N. The satellite has a mass of 2,050 kg (4,520 lb), provides 6.3 kilowatts to its payload, and a planned operational lifespan of 15 years. The satellite carried 37 transponders: 16 operating in the C-band of the electromagnetic spectrum, 20 in the Ku-band and 1 in the L-band.

The satellite is designed to provide TV and radio broadcasting services, data transmission, multimedia services, telephony, and mobile communications.

Ekspress-103 was originally to be launched in 2018, but was delayed to 2020. It used a Proton-M / Briz-M launch vehicle to be placed in a supersynchronous geostationary transfer orbit (16,581 km x 54,811 km x 0.64°) as was Ekspress-80 (16,593 km x 54,812 km x 0.62°).

The Ekspress-103 satellite entered in service at orbital position 96.5° East on 25 March 2021, where it replaced Ekspress-AM33.

== See also ==
- 2020 in spaceflight
