= Ekspress-A3 =

Russian communications satellite

- Names: Экспрeсс-А3; Express-A3; Ekspress-A No.3; Ekspress-3A
- Mission type: Communication
- Operator: Russian Satellite Communications Company (RSCC) / Eutelsat Communications
- COSPAR ID: 2000-031A
- SATCAT no.: 26378
- Website: <br%20/>https://www.eutelsat.com/en/home.html eng.rscc.ru/<br%20/>https://www.eutelsat.com/en/home.html
- Mission duration: 7 years (planned); 9 years (achieved)

Spacecraft properties
- Spacecraft: Ekspress-A3
- Spacecraft type: KAUR
- Bus: MSS-2500-GSO
- Manufacturer: NPO PM (bus); Alcatel Space (payload)
- Launch mass: 2,600 kg (5,700 lb)
- Power: 2540 watts

Start of mission
- Launch date: 24 June 2000, 00:28:00 UTC
- Rocket: Proton-K / DM-2M
- Launch site: Baikonur, Site 200/39
- Contractor: Khrunichev State Research and Production Space Center
- Entered service: August 2000

End of mission
- Disposal: Graveyard orbit
- Deactivated: September 2009

Orbital parameters
- Reference system: Geocentric orbit
- Regime: Geostationary orbit
- Longitude: 11° West (2000–2009)

Transponders
- Band: 17 transponders: 12 C-band; 5 Ku-band
- Coverage area: Europe, Middle East, North Africa, Russia

Ekspress-A3 (Russian: Экспрeсс-А3 meaning Express-A3), also designated Ekspress-3A, is a Russian communications satellite which is operated by Russian Satellite Communications Company (RSCC) and EUTELSAT.

== Satellite description ==
It was constructed by NPO Prikladnoi Mekhaniki (ISS Reshetnev) and Alcatel Space and is based on the MSS-2500-GSO satellite bus. It is equipped with seventeen transponders.

== Launch ==
The satellite was launched at Baikonur Cosmodrome Site 200 on 24 June 2000, at 00:28:00 UTC. The launch was made by Khrunichev State Research and Production Space Center, and a Proton-K / DM-2M launch vehicle was used.

== Mission ==
It is part of the Ekspress satellite constellation. Following its launch and on-orbit testing, it was placed in geostationary orbit at 11° West, from where it provides communications services to Russia, Europe, the Middle East and North Africa.
