= Ekspress-A1 =

Russian communications satellite

- Names: Экспрeсс-А1; Express-A1; Ekspress-6A No.1
- Mission type: Communication
- Operator: Russian Satellite Communications Company (RSCC)
- Website: https://eng.rscc.ru/
- Mission duration: 7 years (planned); Failed to orbit

Spacecraft properties
- Spacecraft: Ekspress-A1
- Spacecraft type: KAUR
- Bus: MSS-2500-GSO
- Manufacturer: NPO PM (bus); Alcatel Space (payload)
- Launch mass: 2,600 kg (5,700 lb)
- Power: 2540 watts

Start of mission
- Launch date: 27 October 1999, 16:16:00 UTC
- Rocket: Proton-K / DM-2
- Launch site: Baikonur, Site 200/39
- Contractor: Khrunichev State Research and Production Space Center
- Entered service: Failed to orbit

Orbital parameters
- Reference system: Geocentric orbit (planned)
- Regime: Geostationary orbit
- Longitude: 11° West

Transponders
- Band: 17 transponders: 12 C-band; 5 Ku-band
- Coverage area: Russia

Ekspress-A1 (Russian: Экспрeсс-А1 meaning Express-A1), also designated Ekspress-6A No.1, is a Russian communications satellite which is operated by Russian Satellite Communications Company (RSCC).

== Satellite description ==
It was constructed by NPO Prikladnoi Mekhaniki (ISS Reshetnev) and Alcatel Space and is based on the MSS-2500-GSO satellite bus. It is equipped with seventeen transponders.

== Launch ==
The satellite was launched at Baikonur Cosmodrome at Site 200/39 on 27 October 1999, at 16:16:00 UTC. The launch was made by Khrunichev State Research and Production Space Center, and a Proton-K / DM-2 launch vehicle was used. It is part of the Ekspress satellite constellation.

The Russian Ekspress-A1 communications satellite was launched in October 1999 but the Proton-K launch vehicle failed early in flight, during second stage burn. This is the second failure of the 8K82K Proton-K in 1999.
