= Ekspress-A4 =

Russian communications satellite

- Names: Экспресс-A1R; Express-A1R; Ekspress-A No. 4 Express-A4; Ekspress-4A; Atlantic Bird 14
- Mission type: Communications
- Operator: Russian Satellite Communications Company (RSCC)
- COSPAR ID: 2002-029A
- SATCAT no.: 27441
- Website: eng.rscc.ru
- Mission duration: 7 years (planned); 17.5 years (achieved)

Spacecraft properties
- Spacecraft: Ekspress-A1R
- Spacecraft type: KAUR
- Bus: MSS-2500-GSO
- Manufacturer: NPO PM (bus); Alcatel Space (payload)
- Launch mass: 2,600 kg (5,700 lb)
- Power: 2540 watts

Start of mission
- Launch date: 10 June 2002, 01:14:00 UTC
- Rocket: Proton-K / Blok DM-2M
- Launch site: Baikonur, Site 200/39
- Contractor: Khrunichev State Research and Production Space Center
- Entered service: August 2002

End of mission
- Disposal: Graveyard orbit
- Deactivated: January 2020

Orbital parameters
- Reference system: Geocentric orbit
- Regime: Geostationary orbit
- Longitude: 40° West (2002–2005); 14° West (2005–2015); 145° East (2016–2020)

Transponders
- Band: 17 transponders: 12 C-band; 5 Ku-band
- Coverage area: Russia

Ekspress-A4 (Russian: Экспресс-A4 meaning Express-A4), is a Russian communications satellite which is operated by Russian Satellite Communications Company (RSCC). It was constructed by NPO PM and Alcatel Space and is based on the MSS-2500-GSO satellite bus.

== Satellite ==
The launch was contracted by Khrunichev State Research and Production Space Center, and used a Proton-K / Blok DM-2M launch vehicle flying from Site 200/39 at the Baikonur Cosmodrome.

== Launch ==
Ekspress-A4 is a Russian geosynchronous communications spacecraft that was launched on 10 June 2002 from Baikonur by a Proton-K launch vehicle at 01:14:00 UTC. The 2,600 kg (5,700 lb) spacecraft carries 12 transponders in C-band and five in Ku-band to provide voice, data, and video communications in Russia.

== Mission ==
It is part of the Ekspress network of satellites. Following its launch and on-orbit testing, it was placed in geostationary orbit at 40° West, from where it provides communications services to Russia. It is equipped with seventeen transponders. In January 2020, the satellite was retired and moved to a graveyard orbit above the geostationary orbit.
