= Ekspress-AM2 =

Russian communications satellite

- Names: Экспресс-АМ2; Ekspress-AM2; Express-AM2
- Mission type: Communications
- Operator: Russian Satellite Communications Company (RSCC)
- COSPAR ID: 2005-010A
- SATCAT no.: 28629
- Website: eng.rscc.ru
- Mission duration: 12 years (planned); 11 years (achieved)

Spacecraft properties
- Spacecraft: Ekspress-AM2
- Spacecraft type: KAUR
- Bus: MSS-2500-GSO
- Manufacturer: NPO PM (bus); Alcatel Space (payload)
- Launch mass: 2,542 kg (5,604 lb)
- Dry mass: 596 kg (1,314 lb)
- Power: 6 kW

Start of mission
- Launch date: 29 March 2005, 21:31:00 UTC
- Rocket: Proton-K / DM-2M
- Launch site: Baikonur, Site 200/39
- Contractor: Khrunichev State Research and Production Space Center
- Entered service: May 2005

End of mission
- Disposal: Graveyard orbit
- Deactivated: 2016

Orbital parameters
- Reference system: Geocentric orbit
- Regime: Geostationary orbit
- Longitude: 80° East (2005–2016)

Transponders
- Band: 29 transponders: 16 C-band; 12 Ku-band; 1 L-band
- Coverage area: Russia, CIS

Ekspress-AM2 (Russian: Экспресс-АМ2, meaning Express-AM2) is a Russian domestic communications satellite. It belongs to the Russian Satellite Communications Company (RSCC) based in Moscow, Russia. To provide of communications services (digital television, telephony, videoconferencing, data transmission, the Internet access) and to deploy satellite networks by applying VSAT technology to Russia and its neighbors (CIS).

== Satellite description ==
The satellite has a total of 29 transponders, was 16 C-band, 12 Ku-band and 1 L-band transponders. The Ekspress-AM2 Russian domestic communications satellite, built by Information Satellite Systems Reshetnev (NPO PM) for Kosmicheskaya Svyaz. The communications payload was built by the French company Alcatel Space.

== Launch ==
Ekspress-AM2 was launched by Khrunichev State Research and Production Space Center, using a Proton-K / DM-2M launch vehicle. The launch took place at 21:31:00 UTC on 29 March 2005, from Site 200/39 at Baikonur Cosmodrome, Kazakhstan. Successfully deployed into geostationary transfer orbit (GTO), Ekspress-AM2 raised itself into an operational geostationary orbit using its apogee motor.

== Mission ==
Ekspress-AM2 was retired in 2016 and was moved into a graveyard orbit above the geostationary belt.
