= Ekspress-AT2 =

Russian communications satellite

- Names: Экспресс-АT2; Express-AT2
- Mission type: Communications
- Operator: Russian Satellite Communications Company (RSCC)
- COSPAR ID: 2014-010B
- SATCAT no.: 39613
- Website: eng.rscc.ru
- Mission duration: 15 years (planned); 12 years and 20 days (in progress)

Spacecraft properties
- Spacecraft: Ekspress-AT2
- Spacecraft type: Ekspress
- Bus: Ekspress-1000K
- Manufacturer: ISS Reshetnev
- Launch mass: 1,427 kg (3,146 lb)
- Power: 3 kW

Start of mission
- Launch date: 15 March 2014, 23:08:00 UTC
- Rocket: Proton-M / Briz-M
- Launch site: Baikonur, Site 81/24
- Contractor: Khrunichev State Research and Production Space Center
- Entered service: 27 May 2014

Orbital parameters
- Reference system: Geocentric orbit
- Regime: Geostationary orbit
- Longitude: 56° East (2026–present) 140° East (2014–2026)

Transponders
- Band: 16 Ku-band
- Coverage area: Russia, Siberia, Kazakhstan

Ekspress-AT2 (Russian: Экспресс-АT2) is a Russian communications satellite which was launched in March 2014. Part of the Ekspress series of geostationary communications satellites, it is owned and operated by the Russian Satellite Communications Company (RSCC).

== Satellite description ==
It is based on the Ekspress-1000K satellite bus manufactured by ISS Reshetnev. Its mass at launch is 1,427 kg (3,146 lb), and the power allocated to the payload is about 3000 watts. The satellite carries 16 Ku-band transponders, providing satellite television to Western and Central Russia, as well as Western and Central Siberia, and almost all of Kazakhstan. The planned service life of the satellite is at least 15 years.

== Launch ==
It was launched, with Ekspress-AT1 communications satellite, on 15 March 2014 at 23:08:00 UTC, from Baikonur Cosmodrome at Site 81/24 in the framework of Russian Federal Space Program for 2006–2015, approved by the Government Decree No. 635 signed on 22 October 2005 by Prime Minister Mikhail Fradkov.

== Mission ==
Express-AT2 was launched into orbit on 15 March 2014. The commercial operation of the satellite started on 27 May 2014.
