= Ekspress AM5 =

Russian communications satellite

Ekspress-AM5
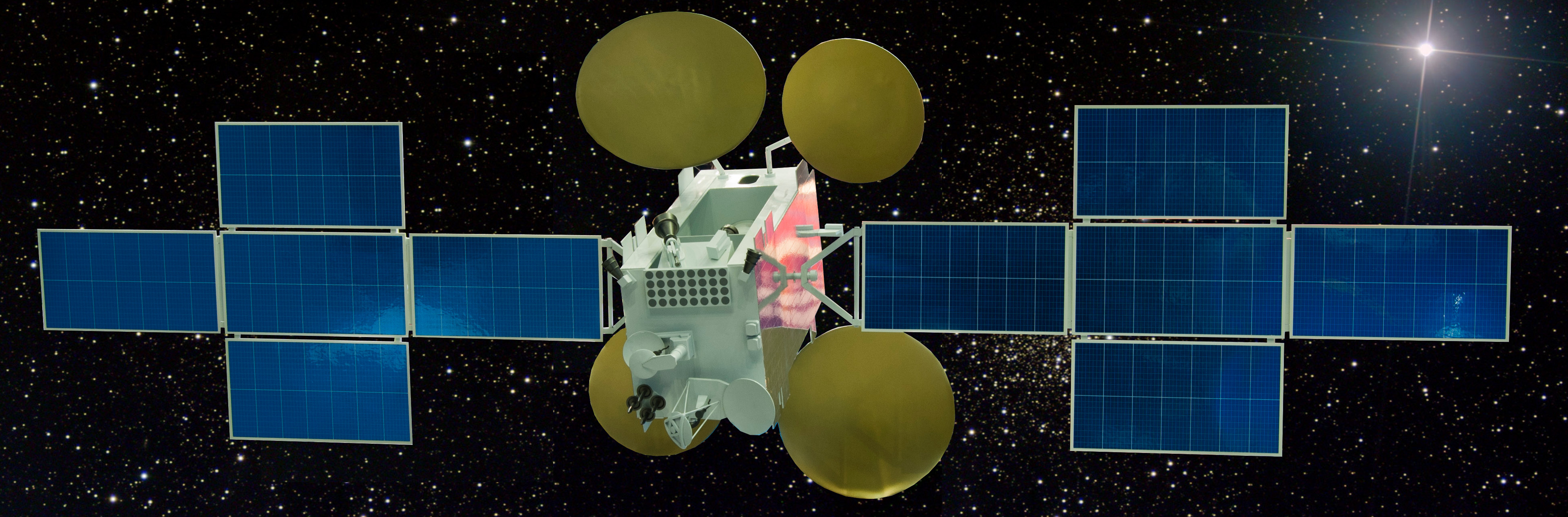
- Eskpress-AM5 satellite
- Names: Экспресс-АМ5
- Mission type: Communications
- Operator: Russian Satellite Communications Company (RSCC)
- COSPAR ID: 2013-077A
- SATCAT no.: 39487
- Website: https://eng.rscc.ru/
- Mission duration: 15 years (planned); 11 years and 3 months (in progress)

Spacecraft properties
- Spacecraft: Ekspress-AM5
- Spacecraft type: Ekspress
- Bus: Ekspress-2000
- Manufacturer: ISS Reshetnev: bus MDA Corporation: payload
- Launch mass: 3,358 kg (7,403 lb)

Start of mission
- Launch date: 26 December 2013, 10:49:56 UTC
- Rocket: Proton-M / Briz-M
- Launch site: Baikonur, Site 81/24
- Contractor: Khrunichev
- Entered service: 22 April 2014

Orbital parameters
- Reference system: Geocentric orbit
- Regime: Geostationary orbit
- Longitude: 140° East

Transponders
- Band: 30 C-band, 40 Ku-band, 12 Ka-band, 2 L-band
- Coverage area: Russian Far East, Southeast Asia, Australia

Ekspress-AM5 (Russian: Экспресс-АМ5) is a Russian communications satellite which was launched in 2013. Part of the Ekspress series of geostationary communications satellites, it is owned and operated by the Russian Satellite Communications Company (RSCC). This satellite is a part of the Ekspress series of geostationary communications satellites.

== Satellite description ==
The total mass of the Ekspress-AM5 satellite was 3,358 kg (7,403 lb), and the satellite had 84 transponders. The onboard antennas were capable of broadcasting in the C-band, Ku-band, Ka-band, and L-band. The lifetime of the spacecraft has been increased to 15 years. While the spacecraft itself is built by Russian RSCC (Kosmicheskiya Svyaz), the communication payload is built by MacDonald, Dettwiler and Associates (MDA) of Canada.

== Launch ==
The Ekspress-AM5 satellite was launched on 26 December 2013 on a Russian Proton-M / Briz-M launch vehicle from Baikonour Cosmodrome, Site 81/24, Kazakhstan.

== Mission ==
It provides digital television and radio broadcasting, telephone, video conferencing, data transmission and Internet services. The satellite is also used for mobile communications among between the Russian president and other government leaders. Express-AM5 carries 30 C-band, 40 Ku-band, 12 Ka-band and two L-band transponders. The satellite is designed for a 15-year lifetime and was to be positioned in geostationary orbit at 140° East longitude, covering Russian Far East, Southeast Asia and Australia. Such an orbit allows the spacecraft to remain in a fixed location in the sky for users on the ground.

The commercial operation of the satellite started on 22 April 2014.
