= Ekspress-AT1 =

Former Russian communications satellite

- Names: Экспресс-АT1; Express-AT1
- Mission type: Communications
- Operator: Russian Satellite Communications Company (RSCC)
- COSPAR ID: 2014-010A
- SATCAT no.: 39612
- Website: eng.rscc.ru
- Mission duration: 15 years (planned); 11 years, 11 months and 19 days (achieved)

Spacecraft properties
- Spacecraft: Ekspress-AT1
- Spacecraft type: Ekspress
- Bus: Ekspress-1000H
- Manufacturer: ISS Reshetnev
- Launch mass: 1,726 kg (3,805 lb)
- Power: 5.880 kW

Start of mission
- Launch date: 15 March 2014, 23:08:00 UTC
- Rocket: Proton-M / Briz-M
- Launch site: Baikonur, Site 81/24
- Contractor: Khrunichev State Research and Production Space Center
- Entered service: 22 April 2014

End of mission
- Disposal: Lost in orbit
- Deactivated: 6 March 2026
- Last contact: 4 March 2026

Orbital parameters
- Reference system: Geocentric orbit
- Regime: Geostationary orbit
- Longitude: 56° East (2014–2026)

Transponders
- Band: 32 Ku-band
- Coverage area: Russia, Siberia, Kazakhstan

Ekspress-AT1 (Russian: Экспресс-АT1) was a Russian Direct-To-Home broadcasting satellite which was launched on 15 March 2014. Part of the Ekspress series of geostationary communications satellites, it was owned and operated by the Russian Satellite Communications Company (RSCC).

== Satellite description ==
It was based on the Ekspress-1000H satellite bus manufactured by ISS Reshetnev. Its mass at launch was 1,726 kg (3,805 lb), and the power allocated to the payload was about 5.880 kW. The satellite carried 32 Ku-band transponders, providing satellite television to Western and Central Russia, as well as Western and Central Siberia, and almost all of Kazakhstan. The planned service life of the satellite was at least 15 years.

== Launch ==
It was launched, with Ekspress-AT2 communications satellite, on 15 March 2014 at 23:08:00 UTC, from Baikonur Cosmodrome at Site 81/24 in the framework of Russian Federal Space Program for 2006–2015, approved by the Government Decree No. 635 signed on 22 October 2005 by Prime Minister Mikhail Fradkov.

== Mission ==
Express-AT1 was launched into orbit on 15 March 2014. The commercial operation of the satellite started on 22 April 2014.

On March 4, 2026, the satellite experienced a disruption of service, and on March 6, RSCC stated the satellite "can be considered lost."
