= Ekspress (satellite bus) =

Satellite bus designed by ISS Reshetnev

The Ekspress (Russian: Экспресс) is a highly flexible satellite bus designed and manufactured by ISS Reshetnev. It is an unpressurized bus originally designed for GEO, but that has been adapted for medium Earth orbit and to highly elliptical orbit. It has different versions and has been used from civilian communications to satellite navigation.

== Platform variations ==
The Ekspress bus has two main platforms: the 1000 light to medium version and the 2000, for heavy satellites. There was a project for a third platform, the 4000, but it has not yet been used.

=== Ekspress-1000 Series ===
The Ekspress-1000 (Russian: Экспресс-1000) in its different variations offers an platform for small to medium satellites. It is a direct to GEO bus for total spacecraft weights from 1,200 kilograms (2,600 lb) to 2,200 kilograms (4,900 lb) and having a power production from 3 kW to 8 kW with a life expectancy of 15 years. It is designed for directly stacking up to 3 of the smallest version (Ekspress-1000K) or 2 of the bigger ones.

- Ekspress-1000K (Russian: Экспресс-1000K): The smallest platform. It is designed for spacecraft up to 1,200 kilograms (2,600 lb), with space for 250 kilograms (550 lb) of payload and up to 3 kW of power generation and 1.8 kW of heat dissipation. It can be stacked up to three Ekspress-1000K.
- Ekspress-1000H (Russian: Экспресс-1000Н): The middle platform. It is designed for spacecraft up to 1,900 kilograms (4,200 lb), with space for 500 kilograms (1,100 lb) of payload and up to 5.6 kW of power generation and 3.5 kW of heat dissipation. It can be dual stacked with Ekspress-1000K or Ekspress-1000H.
- Ekspress-1000SH (Russian: Экспресс-1000SH): The biggest platform. It is designed for spacecraft up to 2,200 kilograms (4,900 lb), with space for 700 kilograms (1,500 lb) of payload and up to 8 kW of power generation and 5 kW of heat dissipation. It can be dual stacked with an Ekspress-1000K.
- Ekspress-1000HT (Russian: Экспресс-1000НТ): Evolution of the SH platform.
- Ekspress-1000HTA (Russian: Экспресс-1000НТА): Evolution of the HT platform.
- Ekspress-1000HTV (Russian: Экспресс 1000НТВ): Evolution of the HTA platform.

=== Ekspress-2000 Series ===
The Ekspress-2000 (Russian: Экспресс-2000) is the fruits of the collaboration with Thales Alenia Space and their Spacebus 4000 experience with the Ekspress-1000H. It is a big platform for spacecraft massing up to 3,500 kilograms (7,700 lb), with space for 1,000 kilograms (2,200 lb) of payload and up to 14 kW of power generation and 7.5 kW of heat dissipation. It is, as the rest of the family, a direct to GEO bus and given its size it is not designed to be stacked. It has an expected design life of 15 years.

=== Ekspress-4000 Series ===
The Ekspress-4000 (Russian: Экспресс-4000) is a collaboration with Thales Alenia Space to mix the best elements of the Ekspress-2000 with the Spacebus 4000. It would be a direct to GEO platform for spacecraft massing up to 3,200 kg (7,100 lb) and having a power production of 14 kW with a life expectancy of 15 years. This would enable more than 60 transponders of payload.

It would lack any orbit raising propulsion, but would keep the electric propulsion thrusters (SPT-100) supplied by OKB Fakel for station keeping. It would also use the Russian solar panels and have versions designed for highly elliptical orbit like Molniya orbit so important for the northerner regions of Russia.

During 2009, the plan was to start with a series of satellites in HEO orbits for the Russian government, called Ekspress-RV Экспресс-РВ). It would be a constellation of three on orbit spacecraft with a fourth backup on Earth, but no further development have been communicated. Nor any of the expected foreign sales were closed.

== List of satellites ==
The Ekspress bus has seen many successes, both for the commercial market and the military programs. Here is a list of all known orders as of July 2016.

Satellite	Bus	Payload	Order	Launch	Launch Vehicle	Intended Orbit	Launch Result	Launch Weight	Status	Remarks
Kosmos 2471 (Uragan-K1 #1, 11L)	Ekspress-1000K		—	2011-02-26	Soyuz-2.1b/Fregat-M	MEO	Success	962 kg (2,121 lb)		First launch of third generation GLONASS.
Luch 5A	Ekspress-1000A		—	2011-12-11	Proton-M/Briz-M	GEO	Success	1,148 kg (2,531 lb)		Launched along AMOS-5.
AMOS-5	Ekspress-1000H		2008	2011-12-11	Proton-M/Briz-M	GEO	Success	1,972 kg (4,348 lb)		Launched along Luch 5A.
Telkom-3	Ekspress-1000H		2009	2012-08-06	Proton-M/Briz-M	GEO	Failure	1,903 kg (4,195 lb)		Stranded in unusable orbit.
Luch 5B	Ekspress-1000AM		—	2012-11-02	Proton-M/Briz-M	GEO	Success	1,350 kg (2,980 lb)		Launched along Yamal-300K.
Yamal-300K	Ekspress-1000HTA		2009	2012-11-02	Proton-M/Briz-M	GEO	Success	1,870 kg (4,120 lb)		Launched along Luch 5B.
Ekspress AM5	Ekspress-2000		2009	2013-12-26	Proton-M/Briz-M	GEO	Success	3,358 kg (7,403 lb)		
Ekspress AT1	Ekspress-1000H		2010	2014-03-15	Proton-M/Briz-M	GEO	Success	1,672 kg (3,686 lb)		Launched along Ekspress AT2.
Ekspress AT2	Ekspress-1000K		2010	2014-03-15	Proton-M/Briz-M	GEO	Success	1,326 kg (2,923 lb)		Launched along Ekspress AT1.
Luch 5V	Ekspress-1000A		—	2014-04-28	Proton-M/Briz-M	GEO	Success	—		Launched along KazSat-3.
KazSat-3	Ekspress-1000HTA		2011	2014-04-28	Proton-M/Briz-M	GEO	Success	—		Launched along Luch 5V.
Luch/Olimp-K 1	Unknown		—	2014-09-27	Proton-M/Briz-M	GEO	Success	3,000 kg (6,600 lb)		
Ekspress AM6 (Eutelsat 53A)	Ekspress-2000		2009	2014-10-21	Proton-M/Briz-M	GEO	Partial failure	3,358 kg (7,403 lb)		Reached its destination using its own propulsion.
Kosmos 2501 (Uragan-K1 #2, 12L)	Ekspress-1000K		—	2014-11-30	Soyuz-2.1b/Fregat-M	MEO	Success	962 kg (2,121 lb)		
Yamal-401	Ekspress-2000		2010	2014-12-15	Proton-M/Briz-M	GEO	Success	2,976 kg (6,561 lb)		
Ekspress AM8	Ekspress-1000HTB		2010	2015-09-14	Proton-M/Blok DM-03	GEO	Success	—		
Blagovest 1 (11L)	Ekspress-2000		2011	2017-08-16	Proton-M/Briz-M	GEO	Planned: 2016	—		
Blagovest 2 (12L)	Ekspress-2000		—	2018-04-18	Proton-M/Briz-M	GEO	—	—		
Blagovest 3 (13L)	Ekspress-2000		—	2018-12-21	Proton-M/Briz-M	GEO	—	—		
Blagovest 4 (14L)	Ekspress-2000		—	2018-09-05	Proton-M/Briz-M	GEO	—	—		
Kosmos 2569 (Uragan-K2 #1, 11L)	Ekspress-1000A		—	2023-09-07	Soyuz-2.1b/Fregat-M	MEO	planned: 2017	1,645 kg (3,627 lb)		
Yamal-601	Ekspress-2000		2015	2019-05-30	Proton-M/Briz-M	GEO	Planned: 2018	—		
Kosmos 2xxx (Uragan-K1 #3, 13L)	Ekspress-1000A		—	Planned: 2018	Soyuz-2.1b/Fregat-M	MEO	Planned: 2018	962 kg (2,121 lb)		
Ekspress 80	Ekspress-1000H		2016	2020-07-30	Proton-M / Briz-M	GEO	Success	—		
Kosmos 2xxx (Uragan-K1 #4, 14L)	Ekspress-1000A		—	Planned: 2018	Soyuz-2.1b/Fregat-M	MEO	Planned: 2018	962 kilograms (2,121 lb)		
Ekspress 103	Ekspress-1000H		2016	2020-07-30	Proton-M / Briz-M	GEO	Success	—		
Kosmos 2xxx (Uragan-K1 #5, 15L)	Ekspress-1000K		—	Planned: 2018	Soyuz-2.1b/Fregat-M	MEO	Planned: 2018	962 kg (2,121 lb)		
Kosmos 2xxx (Uragan-K2 #2, 12L)	Ekspress-1000A		—	Planned: 2018	Soyuz-2.1b/Fregat-M	MEO	Planned: 2018	1,645 kg (3,627 lb)		
Kosmos 2xxx (Uragan-K1 #6, 16L)	Ekspress-1000K		—	Planned: 2018	Proton-M/Blok DM-03	MEO	Planned: 2018	962 kg (2,121 lb)		
Kosmos 2xxx (Uragan-K1 #7, 17L)	Ekspress-1000K		—	Planned: 2018	Proton-M/Blok DM-03	MEO	Planned: 2018	962 kg (2,121 lb)		
Kosmos 2xxx (Uragan-K1 #8, 18L)	Ekspress-1000K		—	Planned: 2018	Proton-M/Blok DM-03	MEO	Planned: 2018	962 kg (2,121 lb)		
Yenisey A1 (ex Luch 4)	Ekspress-2000		—	Planned: 2019	Proton-M/Briz-M	GEO	Planned: 2019	—		
Kosmos 2xxx (Uragan-K1 #9, 19L)	Ekspress-1000K		—	Planned: 2019	Proton-M/Blok DM-03	MEO	Planned: 2019	962 kg (2,121 lb)		
Kosmos 2xxx (Uragan-K1 #10, 20L)	Ekspress-1000K		—	Planned: 2019	Proton-M/Blok DM-03	MEO	Planned: 2019	962 kg (2,121 lb)		
Kosmos 2xxx (Uragan-K1 #11, 21L)	Ekspress-1000K		—	Planned: 2019	Proton-M/Blok DM-03	MEO	Planned: 2019	962 kg (2,121 lb)		
Kosmos 2xxx (Uragan-K2 #3, 13L)	Ekspress-1000A		—	Planned: 2019	Soyuz-2.1b/Fregat-M	MEO	Planned: 2019	1,645 kg (3,627 lb)		
Kosmos 2xxx (Uragan-K1 #12, 22L)	Ekspress-1000K		—	Planned: 2019	Soyuz-2.1b/Fregat-M	MEO	Planned: 2019	962 kg (2,121 lb)		
Kosmos 2xxx (Uragan-K1 #13, 23L)	Ekspress-1000K		—	Planned: 2020	Soyuz-2.1b/Fregat-M	MEO	Planned: 2020	962 kg (2,121 lb)		
Lybid 1	Ekspress-1000T		2010	Planned: 201x	Zenit-3F	GEO	Planned: 201x	1,845 kg (4,068 lb)		Satellite us built and in storage. Future uncertain due to the Russo-Ukrainian war.
Armenian ComSat	Ekspress-1000H		2012	Cancelled					Cancelled	
Zohreh 1	Ekspress-1000K	2005	—	Cancelled					Cancelled	Program cancelled.
Zohreh 2	Ekspress-1000K	2005	—	Cancelled					Cancelled	Program cancelled.
AOneSat 1	Ekspress-1000H	2013	2016	Cancelled					Cancelled	Satellite cancelled.

== See also ==
- ISS Reshetnev – The Ekspress bus designer and manufacturer.
- Russian Satellite Communications Company – The main Russian state operator of communications satellites.
- Ekspress Constellation – Communication satellite family operated by Russian Satellite Communications Company.
- Luch satellite constellation – A Russian relay satellites constellation that enable constant communications with the ISS and Soyuz-MS.
- GLONASS-K – Third generation of the GLONASS navigation satellite that is based on the Ekspress-1000 bus.
- GLONASS-K2 – Evolution of the GLONASS-K based on the Ekspress-1000A bus.
