= Stil i Moda =

Russian shopping channel

Stil i Moda (translated to Style and Fashion) is a Russian shopping channel.

== History ==
TV channel began broadcasting in August 2011. The channel started to be available on satellite Eutelsat W7 in the public domain, after a while it began its distribution among the cable operators of the Russian Federation. On March 1, 2012 Valentin Yudashkin was appointed editor in chief. On April 1, 2012, the channel entered into a social channel pack, of the satellite operator Tricolor TV.

Commercials on TV are shot in its own studio. In the intervals between transmissions of them audience have the opportunity to buy clothes, shoes, accessories and furnishings from renowned designers and newcomers to the world of fashion.

The basic idea of creating such a channel, was made by social necessity.

Most television viewers in this country were unable to buy goods at low prices because of the remoteness from major cities and regional centers. The range of local shops is rarely updated, and beautiful and affordable clothing needs for everyone.

In the formation of the channel range, the channel addresses the needs and possibilities of every citizen of Russia (low prices, good quality and accessibility of purchases). After all, as telephones and TVs in every house exist, and Russian Post has about 42,000 offices, the viewer can get the goods ordered.

== Awards ==
=== Big Digit ===
- TV Channel "Style and Fashion" has in 2012, won the audience award "Big Digit 2012"

=== Golden Ray ===
- TV Channel "Style and Fashion" has won the special prize of "Golden Ray" ceremony for best Home Shopping channel in Russia.

== Satellites ==
- MD-1 (80 degrees)
- Eutelsat W7 (36 degrees)
- Yamal 201 (90 degrees)
