= Tricolor TV =

Russian telecommunications company

Joint Stock Company National satellite company (JSC National satellite company)
- Company type: Closed joint-stock company
- Industry: Telecommunications
- Founded: 2005
- Headquarters: Saint-Petersburg, Russia
- Services: DTH
- Website: tricolor.tv

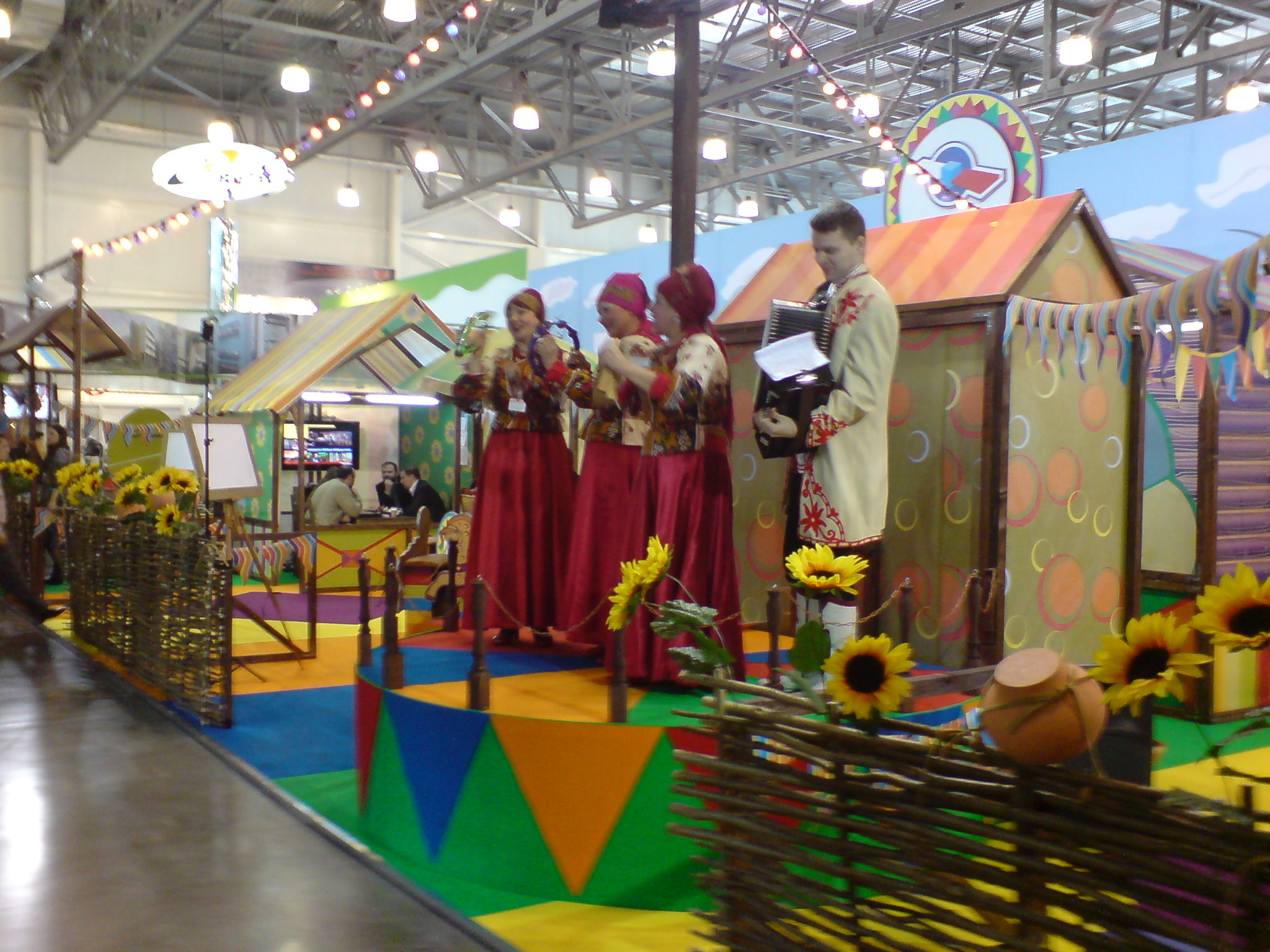
Tricolor TV on CSTB-2009 exhibition, February, Moscow, Crocus Expo.

Tricolor TV (Russian: Триколор ТВ) is Russia's largest direct-to-home provider based in Saint-Petersburg and has broadcast two hundred TV channels in the European part of Russia and Siberia since 2005. As of October 2014, Tricolor TV provided satellite services to over fifteen million subscribers (approximately 40 000 000 viewers).

According to the research of J'son and Partners Consulting, Tricolor TV leads HDTV broadcasting in Russia (39,6%). Tricolor TV is the Russian pioneer of UHDTV broadcasting also.

Broadcasting under the trademarks of Tricolor TV and Tricolor TV Siberia is carried out by the National Satellite Company, CJSC (NSC, Russian: Национальная спутниковая компания).

== Direct-to-home satellites ==
The television service can be received from these DTH satellites:

- At 36º East, for the western territories of Russia, Eutelsat 36A (formerly Eutelsat W4) and Eutelsat 36B (formerly Eutelsat W7);
- At 56º East, for the eastern territories of Russia, Bonum 1 and Ekspress-AT1.

== Company history ==
=== Founding and early growth (2005–2011) ===
Project idea is based on the fact that there is a significant disparity in terms of access to TV channels. In large cities with population over 500,000 at least 15 channels broadcast from the TV transmitter can be received almost everywhere. However, if you drive 20 km away from the transmitter, the picture is getting worse, within 30 km there are serious problems with reception and within 50 km range you can just forget about regular terrestrial TV. These are the numbers that frightened me. Over 50 million people in Russia have an opportunity to receive 5 or less TV channels, generally, with weak signal. Over 20 million people watch 1 channel, the second one's reception quality is too low.

— Dmitry Volobuev, first executive director of NSC.

National Satellite Company, CJSC was founded at 2005 and registered the trademark. It began test broadcast via Eutelsat W4 on the night of 1 October 2005. First of all, company solved the problem of broadcasting Russian TV channels, therefore new provider was named Tricolor TV (in association with Russian three-color flag). On 12 November Tricolor TV started full-time broadcasting. Subscribers gained access to five channels: Russia (it was rebranded as Russia-1 later), REN TV, Kultura (Russian culture, rebranded as Russia-K), DTV (this channel was rebranded as Peretz, Russian pepper) and TV-3 (broadcasts TV series in mystery, science fiction and fantasy genres). Broadcasting was free of charge and it made the provider popular and growing.

For half a year, at May 2006 Tricolor TV was subscribed by 150 000 Russian householders. Free-of-charge package was increased to 14 channels, including Tricolor TV's infochannel.

At February 2007 the number of subscribers was 500 thousand households. 1 April 2007 Tricolor TV started broadcasting Channel One Russia and its sister channels: Telenyanya (now children's channel Carousel) and Dom Kino (Russian the house of cinema).

At May 2007 Tricolor TV introduced commercial pack of channels. To this end, the satellite Eutelsat W4 was rented another transponder. The package includes 10 channels (later package Optimum). 10 December 2007 the company began broadcasting in Siberia from satellite Bonum-1. 1 March 2008 Tricolor TV began commercial broadcasting. Technology partners of Tricolor TV Siberia became Russian Satellite Communications Company and Harmonic Inc.

At 2008 the number of Tricolor TV's subscribers exceeded 3 million. The company has become a self-sustaining. 17 January 2008 Tricolor TV signed a contract with STS channel and Domashny channel (Russian home channel). At July 2009, the number of subscribers Tricolor TV reached 5 million households and January 2010 – 6 million.

At 2010 Tricolor TV started broadcasting new packages of channels: Super Optimum (a lot of channels in MPEG-4 format), Night Package (a package of erotic TV channels) and channel of Russian Football Premier League. From February 2010 to 24 March 2012 Tricolor TV provided services of satellite internet access.

By the end of 2011 Tricolor TV has become one of the leading companies at the Russian TV market with a subscriber base of 9 million subscribers and revenue 4.8 billion rubles. By the end of March 2012 the number of subscribers Tricolor TV reached 10 million households, the total audience of the operator closer to 30 million people.

=== Cancelled merger of Tricolor TV and NTV Plus (2009–2010) ===
On September 15, 2009, it became known that Gazprom Media group signed with NSC memorandum, according to which part of the service and channel NTV Plus is available to subscribers of Tricolor TV. Interested in this transaction, the Federal Antimonopoly Service, as after the proposed transaction Gazprom Media would control 97% of satellite TV in Russia. Deal has not progressed.

=== Change of strategy (2012–2014) ===
On February 7, 2012 Tricolor TV announced a radical change of strategy. At the Russian TV exhibition CSTB 2012 new Tricolor TV's CEO Alexander Makarov said that, at first, Tricolor TV is going to broadcast package of foreign channels and, secondly, to form HDTV package. 1 April 2012 Tricolor TV includes to the package Super Optimum foreign channels: France 24, Deutsche Welle, National Geographic Channel, Nat Geo Wild etc. Tricolor TV started test broadcasting of 10 HD channels. For several months, HDTV channels were free of charge.

Sales of the service Tricolor TV Full HD began on 24 July. 4 September the company reported about 100 000 subscribers of the service. Promotion of the new product is accompanied with a federal advertising campaign more than 1 billion roubles. 12 January 2013 the number of subscribers of Tricolor TV Full HD reached 1 million households. The package was level up to 25 HD channels.

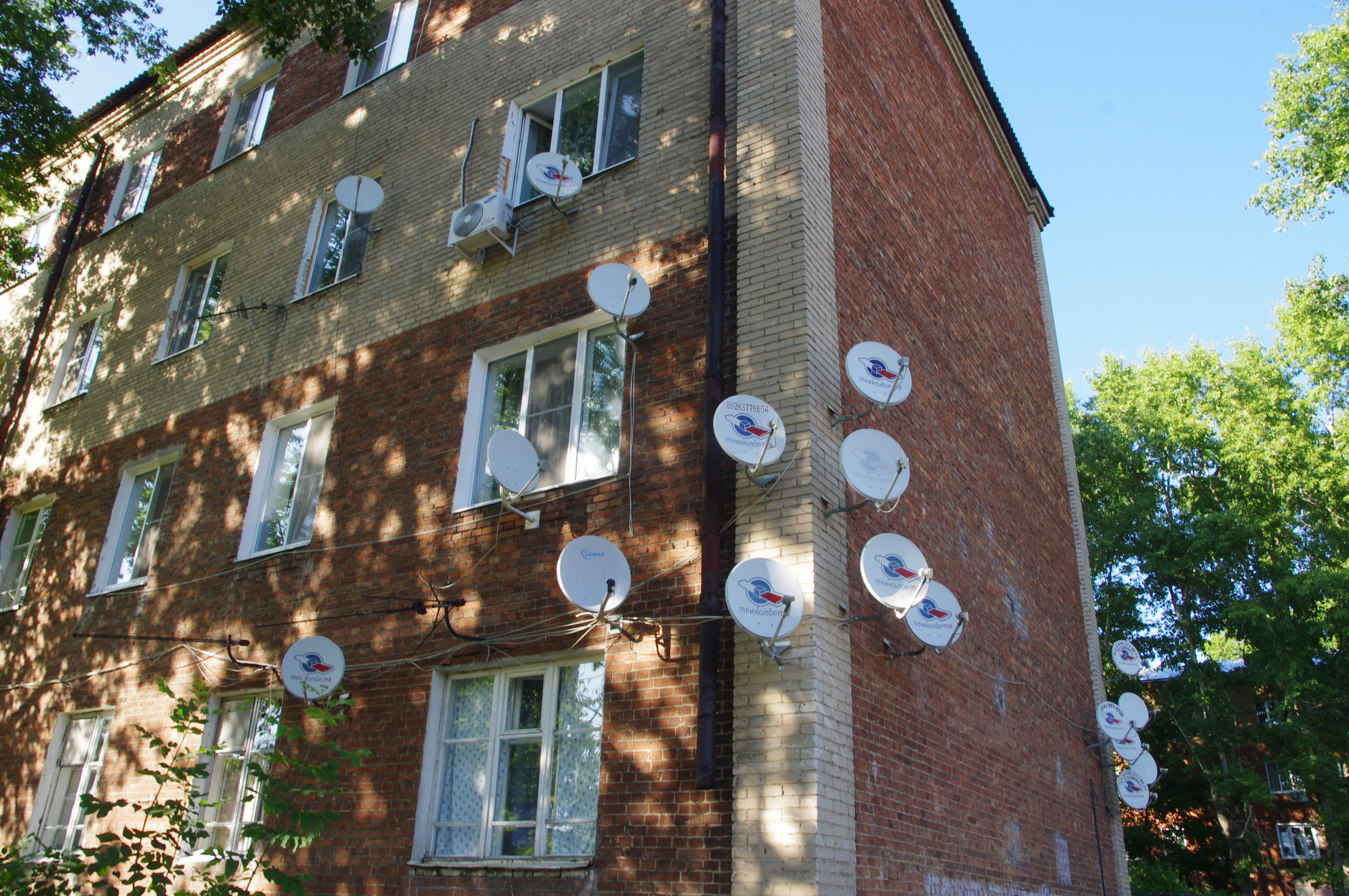
Tricolor TV dishes on building in Moscow Oblast (2014)

At 2013 and 2014, the provider continued to form premium packages. 1 June 2013 Tricolor TV launched Detsky package (Russian package for children). 1 August Tricolor TV began broadcasting HD version of Russian Football Premier League channel. 1 November Music package was launched.

1 October 2013 Tricolor TV introduced own production five-channel cinema package SuperKino HD (Russian super cinema). With a view to content package NSC signed directly contracts with Hollywood studios: The Walt Disney Company, Warner Bros., MGM, Paramount Pictures, and Russian cinema distributors. At autumn 2014, Tricolor TV and Amedia TV announced broadcasting Amedia Premium HD channel, including top American and British TV series: Game of Thrones, Homeland, Sherlock, Boardwalk Empire, etc.

At July 2013 Tricolor TV leased transponder capacity on preparing for the launch of the telecommunications satellite Ekspress AT1 (Russian: Экспресс АT1). 16 March 2014 the satellite was successfully launched with Russian Satellite Communications Company and Russian Federal Space Agency. 22 April Tricolor TV began full-time HD broadcasting from the satellite to Siberia.

At the end of 2013, Tricolor TV's subscriber base exceeded fourteen million householders. 8 October 2014, the company announced fifteen million subscribers.

=== VTB Capital is minor shareholder of Tricolor TV (2013) ===
9 April 2013, VTB Capital (the investment arm of VTB Group) announced the acquisition of a minority stake of National Satellite Company, CJSC. The press release reported that "VTB Capital, as a global investment bank and a financial investor, will boost the capitalization of assets Tricolor TV and will help to prepare the company for IPO in a few years".

=== Tricolor TV’s UHDTV project (2013–2014) ===
27 June 2013 Tricolor TV became the first Russian provider, organized a public broadcasting in UHDTV 4K. For direct satellite broadcasting UHDTV content Tricolor TV used 34 transponder of satellite Eutelsat 36A. For public broadcast Tricolor TV's partner – TV channel Russian Travel Guide (RTG) — filmed a special 19-minute 4K video about extreme sports in Russia. Signal was received with TV set LG 84LM960V. Partners of test broadcasting became Eutelsat Communications, Ericsson, Rohde & Schwarz DVS etc.

22 October 2014 Tricolor TV launched first Russian UHDTV 4K pilot channel.

=== Changes in 2015 ===
On 26 January 2015 instead of the packages "Optimum", "Super Optimum", "Maximum HD", "Maximum HD Siberia" and "Super Maximum HD" the main service "Edinyi" will become available for all subscribers of Tricolor TV. The "Edinyi" tariff will allow to view 28 HD- and over 153 SD-channels depending on the broadcasting format supported by the subscriber's equipment. This step is continuation of implementation of the operator's strategy on transfer to the new standard of modern

On 2 March 2015 the operator's subscribers gain access to the premium HD-film channels of Tricolor TV's own production – "KinoPremium HD", "Semeynoye HD", "Ostrosujetnoye HD", "Nashe HD" – within the "Edinyi" package. And the price for the main service remains the same – 1200 Roubles per year.

=== Financial information (2011–2014) ===
As of 8 October 2014 Tricolor TV is the leader of the Russian Pay TV market with a share of 29% of subscribers. In the satellite segment of the Russian market share of the provider is greater than 75%. Tricolor TV is one of the three world's largest satellite providers, giving the number of subscribers only eldest American DTH-operator DirecTV.

Beginning in 2011, Tricolor TV regularly releases about number of subscribers, revenues and average revenue per user (ARPU).

Year	Subscribers	Revenue	ARPU
2011	9 mln households	4.8 bln ₽	629 ₽
2012	11.9 mln households	6.3 bln ₽	726 ₽
2013	14.1 mln households	8.1 bln ₽	805 ₽
2014 (3Q)	15.2 mln households	not yet published	950 ₽
