= Briz (rocket stage) =

Russian rocket upper stages family

Briz-KM
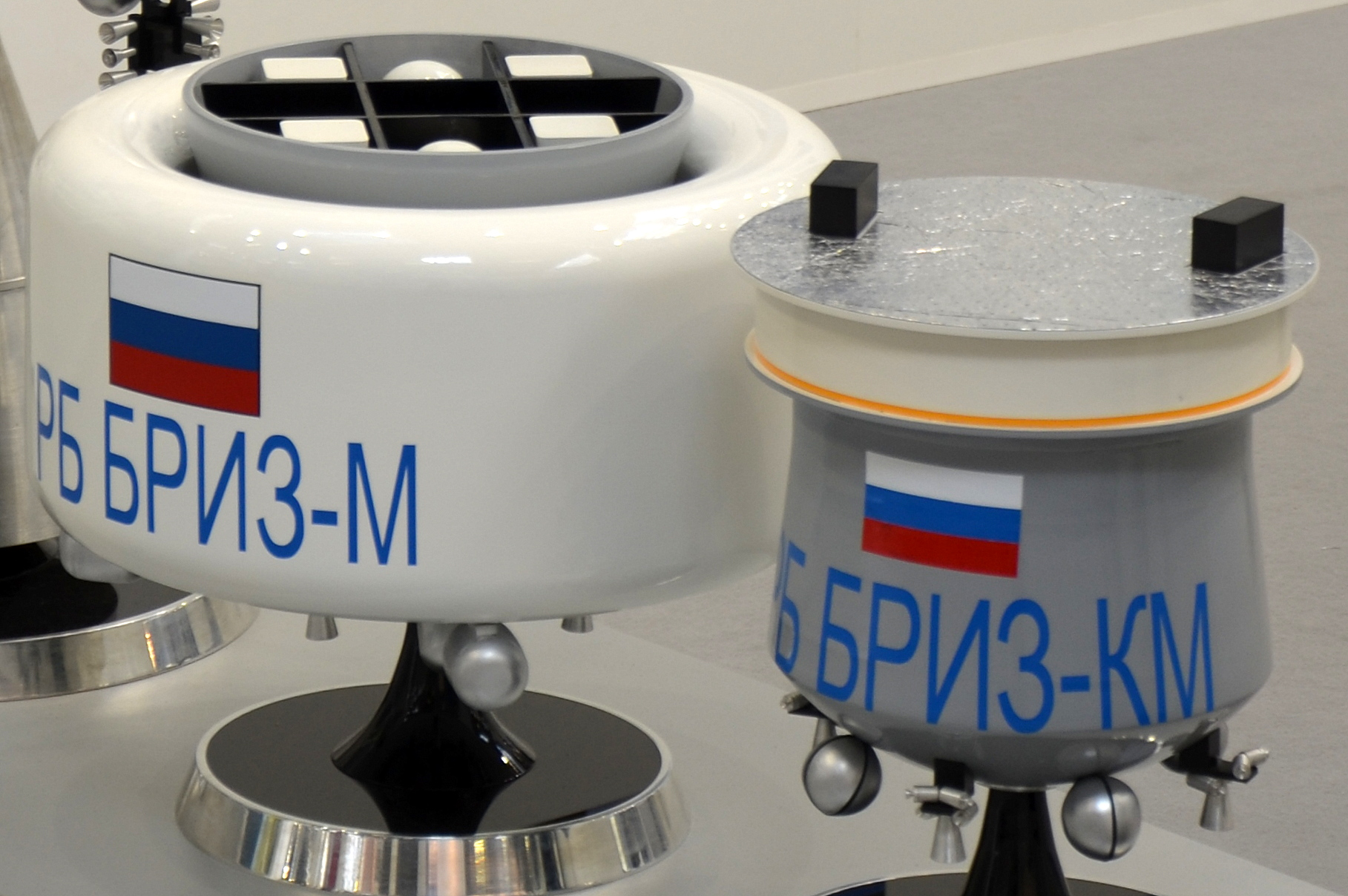
- Models of Briz-M (left) and Briz-KM (right) at the 2013 Paris Air Show
- Manufacturer: Khrunichev
- Country of origin: Russia

General characteristics
- Diameter: 2.5 m (8 ft 2 in)
- Length: 2.6 m (8 ft 6 in)
- Gross mass: 6,475 kg (14,275 lb)
- Propellant mass: 5,055 kg (11,144 lb)

Engine details
- Powered by: 1 × S5.98M
- Maximum thrust: 19.6 kN (4,400 lb_{f})
- Specific impulse: 326 s (3.20 km/s)
- Burn time: 3,000 seconds
- Propellant: N_{2}O_{4} / UDMH

Briz-M
- Manufacturer: Khrunichev
- Country of origin: Russia

General characteristics
- Diameter: 4.1 m (13 ft)
- Length: 2.61 m (8 ft 7 in)
- Gross mass: 22,500 kg (49,600 lb)
- Propellant mass: 20,000 kg (44,000 lb)

Engine details
- Powered by: 1 × S5.98M
- Maximum thrust: 19.6 kN (4,400 lb_{f})
- Specific impulse: 326 s (3.20 km/s)
- Propellant: N_{2}O_{4} / UDMH

The Briz-K, Briz-KM and Briz-M (Russian: Бриз-К, КM and M meaning Breeze-K, KM and M) are Russian liquid-propellant rocket orbit insertion upper stages manufactured by Khrunichev State Research and Production Space Center and used on the Proton-M and Angara A5. The upper stages were also used on Rokot, one of Russia's smaller launchers, before its retirement in 2019.

== Characteristics ==
=== Briz-K and Briz-KM ===
Briz-K, GRAU index 14S12, is a single-piece structure with a conical tank compartment and the engine located in a recess in the fuel tank. Briz-KM (GRAU index 14S45) is an improved version of Briz-K. The Briz-K and Briz-KM were used as a third stage of the Rokot launch vehicles.

=== Briz-M ===
Briz-M, GRAU index 14S43, is designed for injecting large payloads into a low, medium-height or high geosynchronous orbit. Briz-M is a twin upper stage consisting of a core module (using Briz-KM as the baseline) and a jettisonable add-on toroidal tank surrounding the core. It is powered by a pump-fed gimballed main engine, the 14D30. The main engine can be restarted 8 times in flight and allows precision placement of the spacecraft into orbit. Orbital lifetime of the Briz-M is limited by available onboard battery power and is currently 24 hours. The total time of the standard Proton/Briz-M mission to geosynchronous orbit profile from lift-off to spacecraft separation is approximately 9.3 hours. A Proton launch vehicle with a Briz-M upper stage can also inject payloads to Earth escape trajectories.

One of system's design goals has been to keep overall dimensions as small as possible. Briz-M takes much less space on board the launch vehicle compared to its predecessor, the Block D upper stage, leaving freed volume for the cargo. A Proton with a Briz-M can place a 4,385 kg satellite, such as an A2100AX, into a target orbit with an apogee of 35,786 km, a perigee of 7,030 km, and an inclination of 17.3°. Maximum lift capability of the Briz-M stage is 5,645 kg to geosynchronous transfer orbit with a 1,500 m/s residual velocity to GSO. A tandem launch of multiple spacecraft is also supported, with the ability to inject the spacecraft into different orbits.

== History ==
The maiden flight of Briz-M took place on 5 July 1999. The flight was a failure, due to the explosion of the carrier rocket's second stage. The flight had a communications satellite as a payload.

Briz-M completed its first successful flight on 6 June 2000, when it delivered the Gorizont communications satellite into orbit.

It is planned to use Briz-M with the A3 and A5 versions of the future Angara rocket family.

== Launch chronology ==
=== Proton-M/Briz-M ===
#	Launch date	Configuration	Spaceport	Result	Payload	Note
1	5 July 1999	Proton-K/Briz-Me	Baikonur, Site 81/24	Lower stage failure	Raduga 1 communication satellite.	
1	Launch failure due to explosion of Proton second stage					
2	6 June 2000	Proton-K/Briz-M	Baikonur, Site 81/24	Success	Gorizont #45L	First successful flight of the Briz-M
3	7 April 2001	Proton-M/Briz-M	Baikonur, Site 81/24	Success	Ekran-M #18L	Maiden flight of Proton-M
4	29 December 2002	Proton-M/Briz-M	Baikonur, Site 81/24	Success	Nimiq-2	
5	6 June 2003	Proton-K/Briz-M	Baikonur, Site 200/39	Success	AMC-9	
6	10 December 2003	Proton-K/Briz-M	Baikonur, Site 81/24	Success	Kosmos 2402, 2403 and 2404	Three GLONASS positioning satellites
7	15 March 2004	Proton-M/Briz-M	Baikonur, Site 81/24	Success	Eutelsat W3A	
8	16 June 2004	Proton-M/Briz-M	Baikonur, Site 200/39	Success	Intelsat-10-02	
9	4 August 2004	Proton-M/Briz-M	Baikonur, Site 200/39	Success	Amazonas 1	
10	14 October 2004	Proton-M/Briz-M	Baikonur, Site 200/39	Success	AMC-15	
11	3 February 2005	Proton-M/Briz-M	Baikonur, Site 81/24	Success	AMC-12	
12	22 May 2005	Proton-M/Briz-M	Baikonur, Site 200/39	Success	DirecTV-8	
13	8 September 2005	Proton-M/Briz-M	Baikonur, Site 200/39	Success	Anik-F1R	
14	29 December 2005	Proton-M/Briz-M	Baikonur, Site 200/39	Success	AMC-23	
15	28 February 2006	Proton-M/Briz-M	Baikonur, Site 200/39	Failure	Arabsat-4A (Badr-1)	
15	A Briz-M failure leaves it and the payload in unusable orbit, with Briz-M eventually exploding on 19 February 2007, producing over 1,000 trackable pieces of space debris.					
16	4 August 2006	Proton-M/Briz-M	Baikonur, Site 200/39	Success	Hot Bird 8	
17	8 November 2006	Proton-M/Briz-M	Baikonur, Site 200/39	Success	Arabsat-4B (Badr-4)	
18	11 December 2006	Proton-M/Briz-M	Baikonur, Site 200/39	Success	MEASAT-3	
19	9 April 2007	Proton-M/Briz-M	Baikonur, Site 200/39	Success	Anik-F3	
20	7 July 2007	Proton-M/Briz-M	Baikonur, Site 200/39	Success	DirecTV-10	
21	5 September 2007	Proton-M/Briz-M	Baikonur, Site 200/39	Lower stage failure	JCSAT-11	
21	Proton-M with cargo crashed after the first and second stages of the rocket failed to separate due to a damaged pyrotechnic firing cable.					
22	17 November 2007	Proton-M/Briz-M	Baikonur, Site 200/39	Success	Sirius 4	
23	9 December 2007	Proton-M/Briz-M	Baikonur, Site 81/24	Success	Raduga-1M #1	
24	28 January 2008	Proton-M/Briz-M	Baikonur, Site 200/39	Success	Ekspress-AM33	
25	11 February 2008	Proton-M/Briz-M	Baikonur, Site 200/39	Success	Thor 5	
26	14 March 2008	Proton-M/Briz-M	Baikonur, Site 200/39	Failure	AMC-14	Satellite deployed into useless orbit
26	Failed during second Briz-M burn. The failure was caused by a ruptured exhaust gas conduit, which led to a shutdown of the turbo pump feeding the Briz-M engine.					
27	19 August 2008	Proton-M/Briz-M	Baikonur, Site 200/39	Success	Inmarsat 4-F3	A modification was made to the Briz-M engine to include a new conduit in response to the 14 March failure. This modification will be used in all future launches.
28	19 September 2008	Proton-M/Briz-M	Baikonur, Site 200/39	Success	Nimiq-4	
29	15 November 2008	Proton-M/Briz-M	Baikonur, Site 200/39	Success	Astra 1M	
30	10 December 2008	Proton-M/Briz-M	Baikonur, Site 200/39	Success	Ciel-2	
31	10 February 2009	Proton-M/Briz-M	Baikonur, Site 200/39	Success	Express-AM44 and Express-MD1	
32	3 April 2009	Proton-M/Briz-M	Baikonur, Site 200/39	Success	Eutelsat W2A	
33	16 May 2009	Proton-M/Briz-M	Baikonur, Site 200/39	Success	ProtoStar 2 (SES-7)	
34	1 July 2009	Proton-M/Briz-M	Baikonur, Site 200/39	Success	Sirius FM-5	
35	11 August 2009	Proton-M/Briz-M	Baikonur, Site 200/39	Success	AsiaSat 5	
36	17 September 2009	Proton-M/Briz-M	Baikonur, Site 200/39	Success	Nimiq-5	
37	24 November 2009	Proton-M/Briz-M	Baikonur, Site 200/39	Success	Eutelsat W7	
38	29 December 2009	Proton-M/Briz-M	Baikonur, Site 200/39	Success	DirecTV-12	
39	28 January 2010	Proton-M/Briz-M	Baikonur, Site 81/24	Success	Raduga 1M #2	
40	12 February 2010	Proton-M/Briz-M	Baikonur, Site 200/39	Success	Intelsat 16	
41	20 March 2010	Proton-M/Briz-M	Baikonur, Site 200/39	Success	EchoStar XIV	
42	24 April 2010	Proton-M/Briz-M	Baikonur, Site 200/39	Success	SES-1	
43	3 June 2010	Proton-M/Briz-M	Baikonur, Site 200/39	Success	Badr-5	
44	10 July 2010	Proton-M/Briz-M	Baikonur, Site 200/39	Success	EchoStar XV	
45	14 October 2010	Proton-M/Briz-M	Baikonur, Site 81/24	Success	XM-5	
46	14 November 2010	Proton-M/Briz-M	Baikonur, Site 200/39	Success	SkyTerra-1	
47	26 December 2010	Proton-M/Briz-M	Baikonur, Site 200/39	Success	KA-SAT	
48	20 May 2011	Proton-M/Briz-M	Baikonur, Site 200/39	Success	Telstar-14R	
49	15 July 2011	Proton-M/Briz-M	Baikonur, Site 200/39	Success	SES-3 and KazSat-2	
50	17 August 2011	Proton-M/Briz-M	Baikonur, Site 200/39	Failure	Ekspress AM4	
50	Lost contact with Briz-M on fourth burn.					
51	20 September 2011	Proton-M/Briz-M	Baikonur, Site 81/24	Success	Kosmos 2473 (Garpun #1)	
52	29 September 2011	Proton-M/Briz-M	Baikonur, Site 200/39	Success	QuetzSat-1	
53	19 October 2011	Proton-M/Briz-M	Baikonur, Site 200/39	Success	ViaSat-1	
54	4 November 2011	Proton-M/Briz-M	Baikonur, Site 81/24	Success	Kosmos 2475, 2476 and 2477	Three GLONASS-M navigation satellites.
55	25 November 2011	Proton-M/Briz-M	Baikonur, Site 200/39	Success	AsiaSat 7	
56	11 December 2011	Proton-M/Briz-M	Baikonur, Site 81/24	Success	Luch-5A and Amos-5	
57	14 February 2012	Proton-M/Briz-M	Baikonur, Site 200/39	Success	SES-4	
58	25 March 2012	Proton-M/Briz-M	Baikonur, Site 200/39	Success	Intelsat 22	
59	23 April 2012	Proton-M/Briz-M	Baikonur, Site 200/39	Success	Yahsat 1B	
60	17 May 2012	Proton-M/Briz-M	Baikonur, Site 81/24	Success	Nimiq 6	
61	9 July 2012	Proton-M/Briz-M	Baikonur, Site 81/24	Success	SES-5	
62	6 August 2012	Proton-M/Briz-M	Baikonur, Site 81/24	Failure	Telkom 3 and Ekspress MD2	
62	Briz-M failure					
63	14 October 2012	Proton-M/Briz-M	Baikonur, Site 81/24	Success	Intelsat 23	
64	3 November 2012	Proton-M/Briz-M	Baikonur, Site 81/24	Success	Luch-5B and Yamal-300K	
65	20 November 2012	Proton-M/Briz-M	Baikonur, Site 200/39	Success	EchoStar XVI	
66	8 December 2012	Proton-M/Briz-M	Baikonur, Site 200/39	Partial failure	Yamal-402	The satellite was placed close to the intended orbit and could maneuver into its final orbit by itself.
66	Briz-M's upper stage shut down four minutes earlier than planned on its fourth burn due to oxidizer turbopump bearing damage.					
67	26 March 2013	Proton-M/Briz-M	Baikonur, Site 200/39	Success	Satmex 8	Satellite placed into Geostationary transfer orbit
68	15 April 2013	Proton-M/Briz-M	Baikonur, Site 200/39	Success	Anik G1	
69	14 May 2013	Proton-M/Briz-M	Baikonur, Site 200/39	Success	Eutelsat 3D	
70	2 June 2013	Proton-M/Briz-M	Baikonur, Site 200/39	Success	SES-6	Satellite deployed into super-synchronous transfer orbit
71	29 September 2013	Proton-M/Briz-M	Baikonur, Site 200/39	Success	Astra 2E	Satellite deployed into Geosynchronous transfer orbit
72	25 October 2013	Proton-M/Briz-M	Baikonur, Site 200/39	Success	Sirius FM-6	Satellite deployed into Geostationary transfer orbit
73	12 November 2013	Proton-M/Briz-M	Baikonur, Site 81/24	Success	Raduga 1M #3	All telemetry and data from the Briz-M was lost due to failed onboard data processing system (Pyrite), however the satellite was delivered to the correct orbit
74	8 December 2013	Proton-M/Briz-M	Baikonur, Site 200/39	Success	Inmarsat 5-F1	Satellite deployed into super-synchronous transfer orbit
75	26 December 2013	Proton-M/Briz-M	Baikonur, Site 81/24	Success	Ekspress AM5	
76	14 February 2014	Proton-M/Briz-M	Baikonur, Site 81/24	Success	Türksat 4A	Satellite deployed into Geostationary transfer orbit
77	15 March 2014	Proton-M/Briz-M	Baikonur, Site 81/24	Success	Ekspress AT1 and Ekspress AT2	Satellites deployed into Geostationary orbit
78	28 April 2014	Proton-M/Briz-M	Baikonur, Site 81/24	Success	Luch 5V and KazSat-3	Satellites deployed into Geosynchronous orbit
79	16 May 2014	Proton-M/Briz-M	Baikonur, Site 200/39	Lower stage failure	Ekspress AM4R	
79	Failed Proton-M third stage					
80	28 September 2014	Proton-M/Briz-M	Baikonur, Site 81/24	Success	Luch (Olimp-K)	Satellite deployed into Geostationary orbit
81	21 October 2014	Proton-M/Briz-M	Baikonur, Site 81/24	Partial failure	Ekspress AM6	Satellite placed close to designated orbit
81	Satellite was delivered to a lower-than-planned orbit due to problems with the Briz-M. Later, Roscosmos stated that Ekspress-AM6 would be able to reach its planned orbit and expected to be operational by 1 July 2015					
82	15 December 2014	Proton-M/Briz-M	Baikonur, Site 81/24	Success	Yamal-401	Satellite deployed into Geostationary orbit
83	28 December 2014	Proton-M/Briz-M	Baikonur, Site 200/39	Success	Astra 2G	Satellite deployed into Geostationary orbit
84	1 February 2015	Proton-M/Briz-M	Baikonur, Site 200/39	Success	Inmarsat 5-F2	Satellite deployed into Supersynchronous orbit
85	18 March 2015	Proton-M/Briz-M	Baikonur, Site 200/39	Success	Ekspress AM7	Satellite deployed into Geostationary orbit
86	16 May 2015	Proton-M/Briz-M	Baikonur, Site 200/39	Lower stage failure	Mexsat-1	
86	Third stage failure					
87	28 August 2015	Proton-M/Briz-M	Baikonur, Site 200/39	Success	Inmarsat 5-F3	
88	16 October 2015	Proton-M/Briz-M	Baikonur, Site 200/39	Success	Türksat 4B	
89	13 December 2015	Proton-M/Briz-M	Baikonur, Site 81/24	Success	Kosmos 2513 (Garpun #2)	
90	24 December 2015	Proton-M/Briz-M	Baikonur, Site 200/39	Success	Ekspress AMU1	
91	29 January 2016	Proton-M/Briz-M	Baikonur, Site 200/39	Success	Eutelsat 9B	
92	14 March 2016	Proton-M/Briz-M	Baikonur, Site 200/39	Success	ExoMars	Mars exploration/communication satellite
93	9 June 2016	Proton-M/Briz-M	Baikonur, Site 81/24	Success	Intelsat 31	
94	8 June 2017	Proton-M/Briz-M	Baikonur, Site 81/24	Success	EchoStar 21	
95	16 August 2017	Proton-M/Briz-M	Baikonur, Site 81/24	Success	Blagovest 11L	
96	11 September 2017	Proton-M/Briz-M	Baikonur, Site 200/39	Success	Amazonas 5	
97	28 September 2017	Proton-M/Briz-M	Baikonur, Site 200/39	Success	AsiaSat 9	
98	18 April 2018	Proton-M/Briz-M	Baikonur, Site 81/24	Success	Blagovest 12L	
99	21 December 2018	Proton-M/Briz-M	Baikonur, Site 81/24	Success	Blagovest 13L	
100	30 May 2019	Proton-M/Briz-M	Baikonur, Site 200/39	Success	Yamal-601	
101	5 August 2019	Proton-M/Briz-M	Baikonur, Site 81/24	Success	Blagovest 14L	
102	9 October 2019	Proton-M/Briz-M	Baikonur, Site 200/39	Success	Eutelsat 5 West B / MEV-1	
103	30 July 2020	Proton-M/Briz-M	Baikonur, Site 200/39	Success	Ekspress-80 and Ekspress-103	
104	13 December 2021	Proton-M/Briz-M	Baikonur, Site 200/39	Success	Ekspress-AMU3 and Ekspress-AMU7	
105	12 March 2023	Proton-M/Briz-M	Baikonur, Site 200/39	Success	Olymp-K №2	

=== Angara A5/Briz-M ===
#	Launch date	Configuration	Spaceport	Result	Payload	Note
1	23 December 2014	Angara A5/Briz-M	Plesetsk, Site 35	Success	Dummy satellite	Maiden flight of Russia's new-generation Angara A5 launch vehicle
1	Mass simulator intentionally not separated from Briz-M upper stage					
2	14 December 2020	Angara A5/Briz-M	Plesetsk, Site 35	Success	Dummy satellite	Second launch of the Angara A5/Briz-M
2	Mass simulator intentionally not separated from Briz-M upper stage					
3	19 June 2025	Angara A5/Briz-M	Plesetsk, Site 35	Success	Kosmos-2589, Kosmos-2590	First operational flight of the Angara A5 launch vehicle
