= KAUR (satellite bus) =

Satellite bus

A vector diagram of the Luch satellite.

The KAUR (Russian: КАУР, Космический Аппарат Унифицированного Ряда, Universal Spacecraft Series) program was a series of satellite buses designed and manufactured by ISS Reshetnev (then NPO PM). Its design is based on a pressurized bus originally developed in the 1960s and has been used from low Earth Orbit to medium Earth orbit and even to GEO. It has four different generations and its different versions have been used from civilian communications to satellite navigation.

== Generations ==
In total, 4 satellite platform generations were developed: KAUR-1, -2, -3 and -4. From 1965 to 2009, more than 400 communications satellites, both military and civilian, were built on the basis of these platforms and their upgraded versions.

=== KAUR-1 ===
The KAUR-1 was a pressurised cylinder with a diameter of 2 m, length of 3 m and weighed 800 kg. It had no propulsion system, and instead used a passive single-axis magneto-gravity stabilisation system. The KAUR-1 bus became the basis for a series of navigation and related satellites built by OKB-10, later renamed NPO-PM and now ISS Reshetnev. The first generation of the bus was used on:

- Tsyklon
- Sfera
- Parus
- Tsikada

=== KAUR-2 ===
The KAUR-2 was designed by OKB-1 (and later Reshetnev Company) for the Molniya satellites. It was originally an experimental bus, but after successful missions, was put into production. The bus had a sealed 2.5 cubic meter internal volume to stabilize the temperature. Its attitude control system could point with a 10° accuracy, and transmitted in the 10 m bands. Its propulsion system was derived from the Venera 1VA probes. It used the KDU-414 propulsion system and S5.31 engine from 1960 to 1974, after which it upgraded to the KDU-414A with the S5.114 engine. This had a specific impulse of 290 seconds.

- Molniya-1+
- Molniya-1T
- Molniya-2
- Molniya-3
- Molniya-3K

=== KAUR-3 ===
This was developed in the 1960s for the first Russian geosynchronous communications satellites, for repeaters and TV broadcasts. It has a three-axis attitude control system with an accuracy of 0.25°, and independently tracking solar panels.· As part of the development, in July 1974 a Proton DM rocket put a Molniya-1 into geosynchronous orbit as a test communications methods.

- Raduga
- Ekran
- Ekran-M
- Gorizont
- Globus

=== KAUR-4 ===
The KAUR-4 was designed for Russian geosynchronous satellites in the 1980s. It reached flight status in the 1990s.

- Potok
- Tselina
- Luch
- Gals (Ekspress)
- Ekspress-A
- Ekspress-AM
- SESAT-1

=== Ekspress ===
While not presented as such, the Ekspress satellite bus can be considered at least its replacement. It is an unpressurized bus originally designed for GEO, but that has been adapted for medium Earth orbit and to highly elliptical orbit.

== See also ==
- ISS Reshetnev – Designer and manufacturer of the platform.
- Ekspress (satellite bus) – The platform that replaced KAUR for the most demanding applications.
