= Proton-M =

Russian heavy lift launcher which uses hypergolic fuel

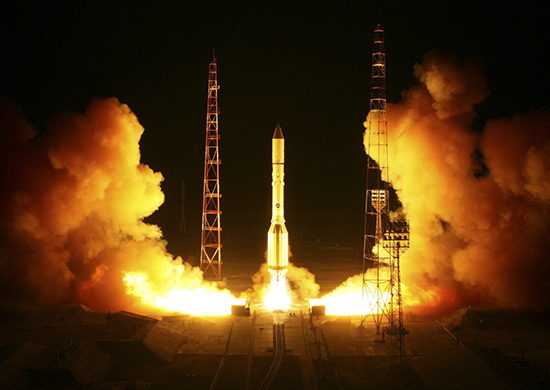
- Launch of Proton-M rocket from the Baikonur Cosmodrome carrying Blagovest satellite
- Function: Heavy-lift launch vehicle
- Manufacturer: Khrunichev
- Country of origin: Russia
- Cost per launch: US$65 million

Size
- Height: 58.2 m (191 ft)
- Diameter: 7.4 m (24 ft)
- Mass: 705,000 kg (1,554,000 lb)
- Stages: 3 or 4

Capacity

Payload to LEO (Note: 180 km (110 mi) circular LEO 51.5° inclination from Baikonur)
- Mass: 23,000 kg (51,000 lb)

Payload to GTO (1800 m/s)
- Mass: 6,920 kg (15,260 lb)

Payload to GTO (1500 m/s)
- Mass: 6,300 kg (13,900 lb)

Payload to GSO
- Mass: 3,250 kg (7,170 lb)

Associated rockets
- Family: Universal Rocket (Proton)
- Based on: Proton-K
- Comparable: Atlas V 551; Delta IV Heavy; Falcon 9 FT; Long March 5

Launch history
- Status: Active
- Launch sites: Baikonur, Sites 81/24 & 200/39
- Total launches: 116
- Success(es): 105
- Failure: 9
- Partial failure: 2
- First flight: 7 April 2001
- Last flight: 12 February 2026
- Carries passengers or cargo: GLONASS, ExoMars, Nauka

First stage – 8S810K
- Height: 21.18 m (69.5 ft)
- Diameter: 7.4 m (24 ft)
- Empty mass: 30,600 kg (67,500 lb)
- Propellant mass: 428,300 kg (944,200 lb)
- Powered by: 6 × RD-275M
- Maximum thrust: 10,532 kN (2,368,000 lb_{f})
- Specific impulse: 285 s (2.79 km/s)
- Burn time: 108 seconds
- Propellant: N_{2}O_{4} / UDMH

Second stage – 8S811K
- Height: 17.05 m (55.9 ft)
- Diameter: 4.1 m (13 ft)
- Empty mass: 11,000 kg (24,000 lb)
- Propellant mass: 157,300 kg (346,800 lb)
- Powered by: 3 × RD-0210; 1 × RD-0211
- Maximum thrust: 2,399 kN (539,000 lb_{f})
- Specific impulse: 327 s (3.21 km/s)
- Burn time: 206 seconds
- Propellant: N_{2}O_{4} / UDMH

Third stage – 8S812
- Height: 4.11 m (13.5 ft)
- Diameter: 4.1 m (13 ft)
- Empty mass: 3,500 kg (7,700 lb)
- Propellant mass: 46,562 kg (102,652 lb)
- Powered by: 1 × RD-0212
- Maximum thrust: 613.8 kN (138,000 lb_{f})
- Specific impulse: 325 s (3.19 km/s)
- Burn time: 238 seconds
- Propellant: N_{2}O_{4} / UDMH

Fourth stage (optional) – Briz-M
- Height: 2.61 m (8 ft 7 in)
- Diameter: 4.0 m (13.1 ft)
- Empty mass: 2,370 kg (5,220 lb)
- Propellant mass: 19,800 kg (43,700 lb)
- Powered by: 1 × S5.98M
- Maximum thrust: 19.62 kN (4,410 lb_{f})
- Specific impulse: 326 s (3.20 km/s)
- Burn time: 3,000 seconds
- Propellant: N_{2}O_{4} / UDMH

Fourth stage (optional) – Blok DM-2
- Powered by: 1 × RD-58M
- Maximum thrust: 85 kN (19,000 lb_{f})
- Specific impulse: 352 s (3.45 km/s)
- Propellant: RP-1 / LOX

Fourth stage (optional) – Blok DM-03
- Powered by: 1 RD-58M/RD-58MF
- Propellant: RP-1 / LOX

Proton-M (Протон-М, GRAU index 8K82M or 8K82KM) is an expendable Russian heavy-lift launch vehicle derived from the Soviet-developed Proton. It is built by Khrunichev, and launched from sites 81/24 and 200/39 at the Baikonur Cosmodrome in Kazakhstan.

First launched in 2001, the rocket has flown 116 launches with 105 successes. Primarily commercial launches of communications satellites to geosynchronous transfer, marketed by International Launch Services (ILS), it has also flown Russian state satellites such as GLONASS, Ekspress, and Blagovest.

In 2013, the rocket was intended to be retired before 2030. Since 2018, Proton has been approaching retirement; Russia's Angara A5, a replacement in the heavy-lift role, conducted four test flights and one operational flight between 2014 and 2025. No new launch service contracts for Proton are likely to be signed; its latest scheduled launches are the Science Power Module 1 to the ISS and an Ekspress satellite, both in 2029. Proton flew its most recent mission on 12 February 2026.

== Vehicle description ==
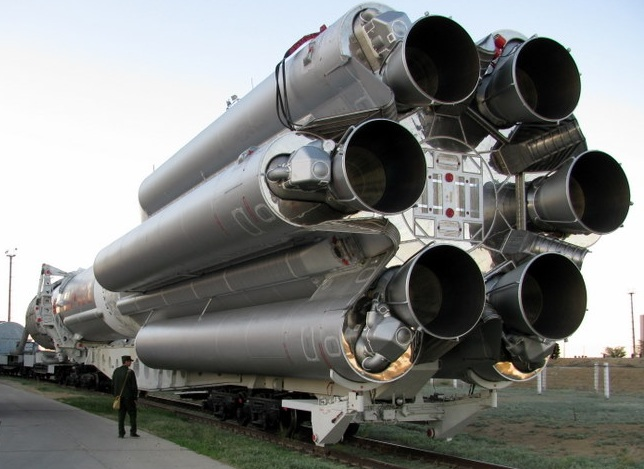
Proton-M rollout

The Proton-M launch vehicle consists of three stages; all of them powered by liquid rocket engines using the hypergolic propellant combination of dinitrogen tetroxide as the oxidizer, and unsymmetrical dimethylhydrazine for fuel.

The first stage is unique in that it consists of a central cylindrical oxidizer tank with the same diameter as the other two stages with six fuel tanks attached to its circumference, each carrying an engine. The engines in this stage can swivel tangentially up to 7.0° from the neutral position, providing full thrust vector control. The rationale for this design is logistics: the diameter of the oxidizer tanks and the two following stages is the maximum that can be delivered by railroad to Baikonur. However, within Baikonur the fully assembled stack is transported again by rail, as it has enough clearance.

The second stage uses a conventional cylindrical design. It is powered by three RD-0210 engines and one RD-0211 engine. The RD-0211 is a version of the RD-0210 modified with a heat exchanger used to pressurize the propellant tanks. The second stage is joined to the first stage through a net instead of a closed inter-stage, to allow the exhaust to escape because the second stage begins firing seconds before separation. Known as "hot staging," this eliminates the need for ullage thrusters on the second stage. Thrust vector control is provided by engine gimballing.

The third stage is also of a conventional cylindrical design. It contains the avionics system that controls the first two stages. It uses one RD-0213 which is a fixed (non-gimballed) version of the RD-0210, and one RD-0214 which is a four nozzle vernier engine used for thrust vector control. The nozzles of the RD-0214 can turn up to 45.0°; they are placed around (with some separation), and moderately above the nozzle of the RD-0213.

The Proton-M features modifications to the lower stages to reduce structural mass, increase thrust, and utilise more propellant. A closed-loop guidance system is used on the first stage, which allows more complete consumption of propellant. This increases the rocket's performance slightly compared to previous variants, and reduces the amount of toxic chemicals remaining in the stage when it impacts downrange. It can place up to 21,000 kilograms (46,000 lb) into low Earth orbit. With an upper stage, it can place a 3000 kg payload into geostationary orbit (GEO), or a 5500 kg payload into geostationary transfer orbit (GTO). Efforts were also made to reduce dependency on foreign component suppliers.

=== Upper stage ===
Most Proton-M launches have used a Briz-M upper stage to propel the spacecraft into a higher orbit. Launches have also been made with Blok-DM upper stages: six launches were made with the Blok DM-02 upper stage carrying GLONASS spacecraft, while seven further launches have used the Blok DM-03. As of 2023, only a single Proton-M launch has taken place without an upper stage to launch Nauka and the European Robotic Arm (ERA) to the International Space Station in July 2021.

=== Payload fairing ===
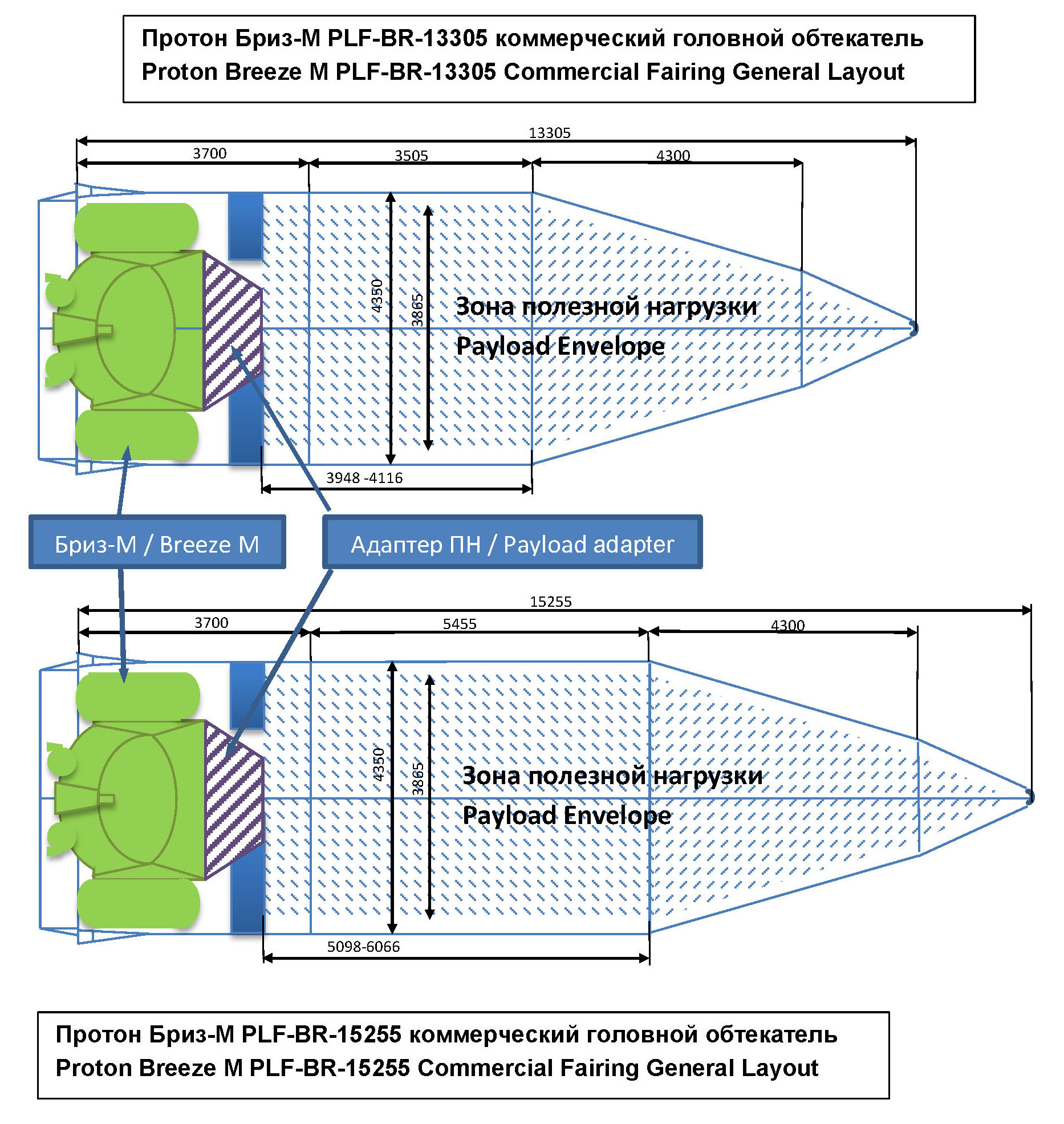
Proton-M/Briz-M payload fairing

Commercial launches conducted by ILS use two kinds of fairings:

- PLF-BR-13305 short fairing.
- PLF-BR-15255 long fairing.

Both fairings have a diameter of 4.35 meters.

=== Proton-M Enhanced (M+) ===
On 7 July 2007, International Launch Services launched the first Proton-M Enhanced rocket (also called M+), which carried the DirecTV-10 satellite into orbit. This was the 326th launch of a Proton, the 16th Proton-M/Briz-M launch, and the 41st Proton launch to be conducted by ILS. It features more efficient first stage engines, updated avionics, lighter fuel tanks and more powerful vernier engines on the Briz-M upper stage, and mass reduction throughout the rocket, including thinner fuel tank walls on the first stage, and use of composite materials on all other stages. The second launch of this variant occurred on 18 August 2008, and was used to place Inmarsat 4 F3 into orbit. The baseline Proton-M was retired in November 2007, in favour of the Enhanced variant.

Frank McKenna, CEO of ILS, has indicated that in 2010 the Phase III Proton design would become the standard ILS configuration, with the ability to lift 6150 kg to GTO.

On 19 October 2011, ViaSat-1 weighing 6740 kg was lifted into GTO by the Proton-M/Briz-M Phase III.

=== Light and Medium variants ===
Proton Light and Proton Medium were two proposed variants with a lower payload capacity at a reduced price. Originally proposed end of 2016, Proton Light was cancelled in 2017 and Proton Medium was put on "indefinite hold" in 2018. The variants were designed to reduce the cost for launching medium and small commercial communications satellites into Geostationary Transfer Orbit (GTO). The variants were planned with a 2 + 1 stage architecture based on 3 stage Proton/Briz M, but dispensing with the 2nd stage and featuring minor lengthening of the other two stages. The Proton Light 1st stage was planned with 4 main engines and external tanks to the 6 used by Proton Medium and Proton-M. The cost was expected to be competitive with Ariane and SpaceX. The planned maiden flights were 2018 for Proton Medium and 2019 for Proton Light. They were expected to use Baikonur Cosmodrome Site 81/24 and would have required a new transporter-erector system and other ground infrastructure changes.

The full-sized Proton-M can currently lift 6300 kg into a standard Geostationary Transfer Orbit (GTO); Proton Medium was planned to lift 5000 kg into a similar GTO while Proton Light was rated for 3600 kg. The 3000–5000 kg payload range includes all-electric and hybrid satellites that use ion thrusters to slowly make their way into geostationary orbit (GEO).

=== Launch profile ===
In a typical mission, a Proton-M is accompanied by a Briz-M upper stage. The Proton-M launches the orbital unit (that is: the payload, the payload adapter and the Briz-M) into a slightly suborbital trajectory. The first and second stages and the payload fairing crash into designated crash sites; the third stage crashes into the ocean. After the third stage separates, the orbital unit coasts for a brief period, then Briz-M performs its first firing to achieve orbital injection into a parking orbit with 51.5° inclination, at 170 km to 230 km altitude (the Mission Planner's Guide also mentions 64.8° and 72.6° as standard inclinations for the parking orbit). Subsequently, the Briz-M performs orbital maneuvers to place the payload into either its final orbit or a transfer orbit. If a transfer orbit is used the final maneuver(s) are performed by the payload on its own propulsion system.

== Reliability ==
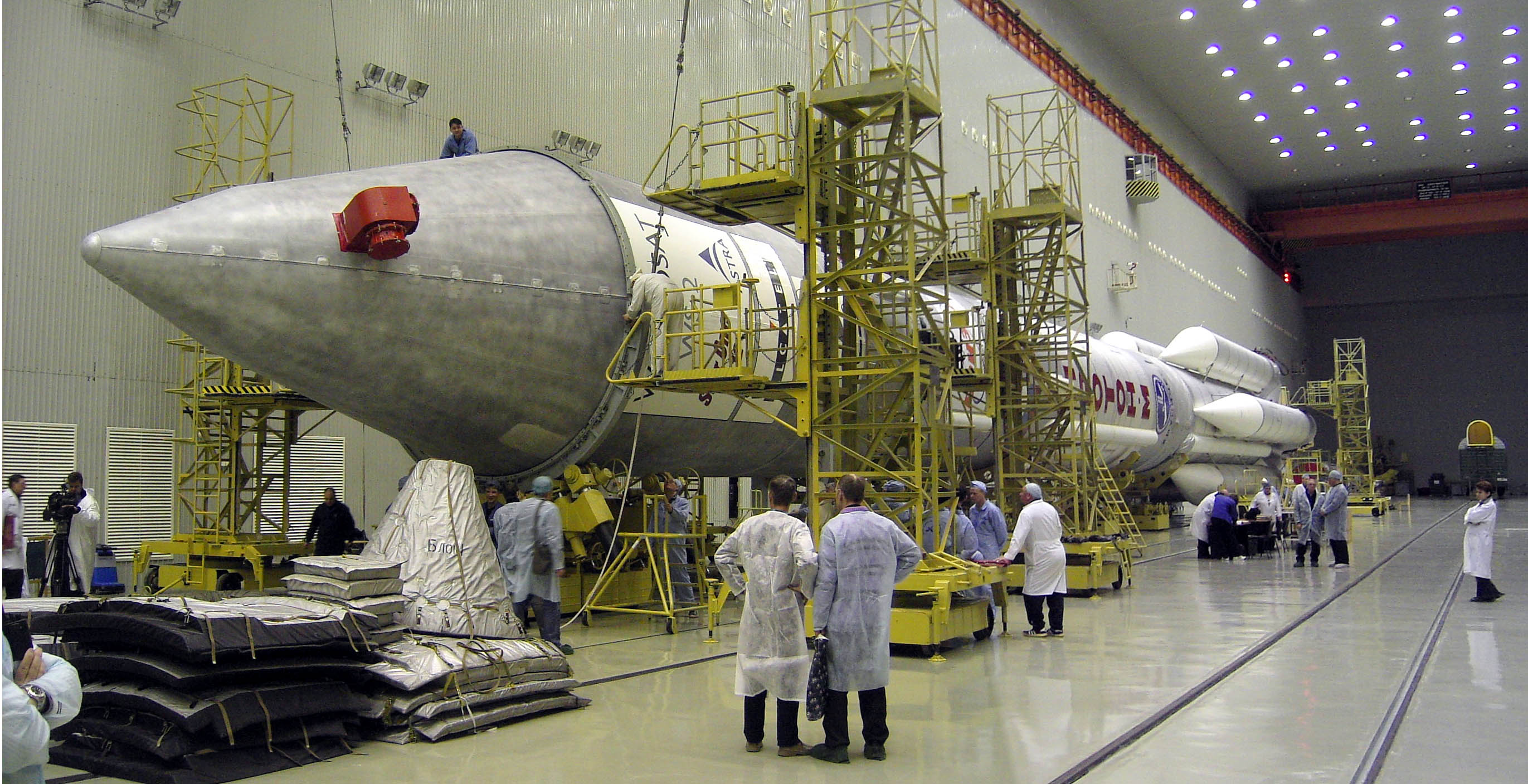
Proton-M in assembly building awaiting rollout

As of 22 June 2024, 115 Proton-M launches had occurred, of which 11 failed or partially failed, yielding a success rate of 90%. Four of these failures were the results of problems with the Proton-M itself, six were caused by the Briz-M upper stage malfunctioning and leaving cargo in a useless orbit (albeit on two instances the satellites were able to maneuver to correct orbit under their own propulsion), and one was the result of a Blok DM-03 upper stage being incorrectly fueled, leaving the Proton too heavy to achieve orbit.

=== Notable launch failures ===
In September 2007, a Proton-M/Briz-M rocket carrying Japan's JCSAT-11 communications satellite failed to achieve orbit, and fell in the Ulytau District of Kazakhstan. An investigation determined that first and second stages of the rocket had failed to separate, due to a damaged pyrotechnic cable.

On 5 December 2010, the upper stage and payloads failed to reach orbital velocity due to overloading of the upper stage with 1500 kg of liquid oxygen, resulting in the loss of three GLONASS satellites it was carrying.

In July 2013, a Proton-M/DM-03 carrying three GLONASS satellites failed shortly after liftoff. The booster began pitching left and right along the vertical axis within a few seconds of launch. Attempts by the onboard guidance computer to correct the flight trajectory failed and ended up putting it into an unrecoverable pitchover. The upper stages and payload were stripped off 24 seconds after launch due to the forces experienced. Afterwards, the first stage broke apart and erupted into flames. Impact with the ground occurred 30 seconds after liftoff. The preliminary report of the investigation into the July 2013 failure indicated that three of the first stage angular velocity sensors, responsible for yaw control, were installed in an incorrect orientation. As the error affected the redundant sensors as well as the primary ones, the rocket was left with no yaw control, which resulted in the failure. Telemetry data also indicated that a pad umbilical had detached prematurely, suggesting that the Proton may have launched several tenths of a second early, before the engines reached full thrust.

In May 2014, another Proton-M launch ended in failure, resulting in the loss of an Ekspress telecommunications satellite. Unlike the 2013 crash, this occurred more than nine minutes into the flight when one of the third stage verniers shut off, causing loss of attitude control. An automatic shutdown and destruct command was issued and the remains of the upper stages and payload impacted in northern China. An investigation committee concluded that the failure was most likely due to one of the turbopumps breaking off its mount, rupturing a propellant line and causing the vernier to lose thrust.

In May 2015, a Proton-M with a Mexican telecommunications satellite, MexSat-1, was lost due to problems with the third stage. Russian sources indicated that the problems had been the same as with the 2014 failure. An investigation determined that the third stage vernier engine RD-0214 failed due to excessive vibration loads, which had been caused by an increasing imbalance of the rotor in the turbopump and concluded it was the same cause of a prior accident in 1988.

In a June 2016 launch, one of the four second stage engines shut down prematurely. The Briz-M was able to make up for the resulting stage under-performance and deliver the Intelsat 31 satellite to the intended orbit. Pending an investigation, the rocket was grounded for the rest of 2016 and first half of 2017: Proton-M at that time planned to return to the launch pad around June 2017 to deliver the EchoStar-21 satellite to orbit.

On 28 January 2017, the Russian government announced, as a result of the investigation into the failure of Progress MS-04, the recall of all Proton-M 2nd and 3rd stage engines produced by the Voronezh Mechanical Plant, including the disassembly of three completed Proton rockets and a three and a half month suspension of flights. The investigation found that cheaper alternatives, unable to resist high temperatures, had been used in place of engine parts containing valuable minerals, and that production and certification documentation had been falsified.

Proton returned to flight 8 June 2017, a full year after the previous flight on 6 June 2016.

=== Upper stage malfunctions ===
Among the various Proton-M failures, some have been caused by the upper stages used to allow the rocket to deliver payloads to higher orbit, notably the failures in May 2014 and May 2015.

At least five earlier launches also succumbed to problems with the Briz-M upper stage; Arabsat-4A in February 2006, AMC-14 in March 2008, Ekspress AM4 in August 2011, Telkom-3 and Ekspress MD2 in August 2012 and Yamal-402 in December 2012. All of the payloads were unusable except for Yamal-402, which was able to correct its orbit at the expense of several years' operational life, and AMC-14 which was sold to the US Government after SES determined that it couldn't complete its original mission.

=== Effect on government and industry ===
As a result of the July 2013, Proton-M launch failure, a major reorganization of the Russian space industry was undertaken. The United Rocket and Space Corporation was formed as a joint-stock corporation by the government in August 2013 to consolidate the Russian space sector. Deputy Prime Minister Dmitry Rogozin said "the failure-prone space sector is so troubled that it needs state supervision to overcome its problems". Three days following the failure, the Russian government had announced that "extremely harsh measures" would be taken "and spell the end of the [Russian] space industry as we know it".

== Environmental impact ==
Critics claim that Proton rocket fuel (unsymmetrical dimethylhydrazine (UDMH)) and debris created by Russia's space programme is poisoning areas of Russia and Kazakhstan. Residents claim that acid rain falls after some launches. Anatoly Kuzin, deputy director of the Khrunichev State Research and Production Space Center, has however denied these claims, saying: "We did special research into the issue. The level of acidity in the atmosphere is not affected by the rocket launches [and] there is no data to prove any link between the illnesses, in Altai town and the influence of rocket fuel components or space activity of any kind".

== Launch History ==
Flight No.	Date / time (UTC)	Rocket, Configuration	Launch site	Payload	Payload mass	Orbit	Users	Launch outcome
535-01	7 April 2001; 03:47:00	Proton-M/Briz-M	Site 81/24	(Russia) Ekran-M №4 (Ekran-M 18L)		Geosynchronous	RSCC	Success
535-01	Maiden flight of the Proton-M							
535-02	29 December 2002; 23:16:40	Proton-M/Briz-M	Site 81/24	(Canada) Nimiq-2		Geosynchronous transfer	Telesat	Success
535-03	15 March 2004; 23:06:00	Proton-M/Briz-M	Site 81/24	(France) Eutelsat W3A		Geosynchronous transfer	Eutelsat	Success
535-06	16 June 2004; 22:27:00	Proton-M/Briz-M	Site 200/39	(United States) Intelsat-10-02		Geosynchronous transfer	Intelsat	Success
535-07	4 August 2004; 22:32:00	Proton-M/Briz-M	Site 200/39	(Spain) Amazonas 1		Geosynchronous transfer	Hispasat	Success
535-08	14 October 2004; 21:23:00	Proton-M/Briz-M	Site 200/39	(United States) AMC-15		Geosynchronous transfer	SES Americom	Success
535-09	3 February 2005; 02:27:32	Proton-M/Briz-M	Site 81/24	(United States) AMC-12		Geosynchronous transfer	SES Americom	Success
535-10	22 May 2005; 17:59:08	Proton-M/Briz-M	Site 200/39	(United States) DirecTV-8		Geosynchronous transfer	DirecTV	Success
535-12	8 September 2005; 21:53:40	Proton-M/Briz-M	Site 200/39	(Canada) Anik-F1R		Geosynchronous transfer	Telesat	Success
535-13	29 December 2005; 02:28:40	Proton-M/Briz-M	Site 200/39	(United States) AMC-23		Geosynchronous transfer	SES Americom	Success
535-11	28 February 2006; 20:10:00	Proton-M/Briz-M	Site 200/39	(Saudi Arabia) Arabsat-4A (Badr-1)		Geosynchronous transfer (Intended)	Arabsat	Failure
535-11	Briz-M upper stage shut down prematurely due to a burn through in the oxidizer supply system during the second burn.							
535-14	4 August 2006; 21:48:00	Proton-M/Briz-M	Site 200/39	(France) Hot Bird 8		Geosynchronous transfer	Eutelsat	Success
535-15	8 November 2006; 20:01:00	Proton-M/Briz-M	Site 200/39	(Saudi Arabia) Arabsat-4B (Badr-4)		Geosynchronous transfer	Arabsat	Success
535-21	11 December 2006; 23:28:43	Proton-M/Briz-M	Site 200/39	(Malaysia) MEASAT-3		Geosynchronous transfer	MEASAT	Success
535-16	9 April 2007; 22:54:00	Proton-M/Briz-M	Site 200/39	(Canada) Anik-F3		Geosynchronous transfer	Telesat	Success
535-20	7 July 2007; 01:16:00	Proton-M/Briz-M	Site 200/39	(United States) DirecTV-10		Geosynchronous transfer	DirecTV	Success
535-22	5 September 2007; 22:43:10	Proton-M/Briz-M	Site 200/39	(Japan) JCSAT-11		Geosynchronous transfer (intended)	Sky Perfect JSAT	Failure
535-22	The first and second stages of the rocket failed to separate due to a damaged pyrotechnic firing cable.							
535-23	17 November 2007; 22:39:47	Proton-M/Briz-M	Site 200/39	(Sweden) Sirius 4		Geosynchronous transfer	SES Sirius	Success
535-23	Commercial launch from ILS							
535-26	9 December 2007; 00:16	Proton-M/Briz-M	Site 81/24	(Russia) Raduga-1M №1		Geosynchronous		Success
535-26	Military communications satellite							
535-28	25 December 2007; 19:32:34	Proton-M/Block-DM-2	Site 81/24	(Russia) Kosmos 2434 (GLONASS-M №721) (Russia) Kosmos 2435 (GLONASS-M №722) (Russia) Kosmos 2436 (GLONASS-M №723)		Medium Earth		Success
535-28	GLONASS-M launch							
535-27	28 January 2008; 00:18:00	Proton-M/Briz-M	Site 200/39	(Russia) Ekspress-AM33		Geosynchronous	RSCC	Success
535-27	Ekspress satellite launch							
535-24	11 February 2008; 11:34:00	Proton-M/Briz-M	Site 200/39	(Norway) Thor 5		Geosynchronous transfer	Telenor	Success
535-24	Commercial launch from ILS							
535-25	14 March 2008; 23:18:55	Proton-M/Briz-M	Site 200/39	(United States) AMC-14		Geosynchronous transfer (intended)	SES Americom	Failure
535-25	Commercial launch from ILS. Briz-M upper stage shut down prematurely due to rupturing of the gas duct between the gas generator and the propellant pump turbine by high heat erosion.							
935-02	19 August 2008; 22:43:00	Proton-M/Briz-M	Site 200/39	(United Kingdom) Inmarsat 4-F3		Geosynchronous transfer	Inmarsat	Success
935-02	Commercial launch from ILS							
535-29	19 September 2008; 21:48:00	Proton-M/Briz-M	Site 200/39	(Canada) Nimiq-4		Geosynchronous transfer	Telesat	Success
535-29	Commercial launch from ILS							
535-31	25 September 2008; 08:49:37	Proton-M/Block-DM-2	Site 81/24	(Russia) Kosmos 2442 (GLONASS-M №724) (Russia) Kosmos 2443 (GLONASS-M №725) (Russia) Kosmos 2444 (GLONASS-M №726)		Medium Earth		Success
535-31	GLONASS-M launch							
535-33	15 November 2008; 20:44:20	Proton-M/Briz-M	Site 200/39	(Luxembourg) Astra 1M		Geosynchronous transfer	SES Astra	Success
535-33	Commercial launch from ILS							
935-03	10 December 2008; 13:43:00	Proton-M/Briz-M	Site 200/39	(Canada) Ciel-2		Geosynchronous transfer	Ciel	Success
935-03	Commercial launch from ILS							
535-34	25 December 2008; 10:43:42	Proton-M/Block-DM-2	Site 81/24	(Russia) Kosmos 2447 (GLONASS-M №727) (Russia) Kosmos 2448 (GLONASS-M №728) (Russia) Kosmos 2449 (GLONASS-M №729)		Medium Earth		Success
535-34	GLONASS-M launch							
935-01	10 February 2009; 00:03:00	Proton-M/Briz-M	Site 200/39	(Russia) Ekspress-AM44 (Russia) Ekspress-MD1		Geosynchronous	RSCC	Success
935-01	Ekspress satellite launch							
410-16	28 February 2009; 04:10:00	Proton-M/Block-DM-2	Site 81/24	(Russia) Raduga-1 №8 (Globus-18L)		Geosynchronous		Success
410-16	Military Comsat launch							
935-04	3 April 2009; 16:24:00	Proton-M/Briz-M	Site 200/39	(France) Eutelsat W2A		Geosynchronous transfer	Eutelsat	Success
935-04	Commercial launch from ILS							
935-05	16 May 2009; 00:57:38	Proton-M/Briz-M	Site 200/39	(United States) ProtoStar 2 (SES-7)		Geosynchronous transfer	ProtoStar	Success
935-05	Commercial launch from ILS							
935-06	30 June 2009; 19:10:00	Proton-M/Briz-M	Site 200/39	(United States) Sirius FM-5		Geosynchronous transfer	Sirius XM	Success
935-06	Commercial launch from ILS							
935-07	11 August 2009; 19:47:33	Proton-M/Briz-M	Site 200/39	(China) AsiaSat 5		Geosynchronous transfer	AsiaSat	Success
935-07	Commercial launch from ILS							
935-08	17 September 2009; 19:19:19	Proton-M/Briz-M	Site 200/39	(Canada) Nimiq-5		Geosynchronous transfer	Telesat	Success
935-08	Commercial launch from ILS							
935-09	24 November 2009; 14:19:10	Proton-M/Briz-M	Site 200/39	(France) Eutelsat W7		Geosynchronous transfer	Eutelsat	Success
935-09	Commercial launch from ILS							
535-38	14 December 2009; 10:38:27	Proton-M/Block-DM-2	Site 81/24	(Russia) Kosmos 2456 (GLONASS-M №730) (Russia) Kosmos 2457 (GLONASS-M №731) (Russia) Kosmos 2458 (GLONASS-M №732)		Medium Earth		Success
535-38	GLONASS-M launch							
935-10	29 December 2009; 00:22:00	Proton-M/Briz-M	Site 200/39	(United States) DirecTV-12		Geosynchronous transfer	DirecTV	Success
935-10	Commercial launch from ILS							
535-35	28 January 2010; 00:18:00	Proton-M/Briz-M	Site 81/24	(Russia) Raduga-1M №2 (Globus-M 12L)		Geosynchronous		Success
535-35	Military Communications satellite							
535-32	12 February 2010; 00:39:40	Proton-M/Briz-M	Site 200/39	(United States) Intelsat 16		Geosynchronous transfer	Intelsat	Success
535-32	Commercial launch conducted by International Launch Services							
535-40	1 March 2010; 21:19:44	Proton-M/DM-2	Site 81/24	(Russia) Kosmos 2459 (GLONASS-M №731) (Russia) Kosmos 2460 (GLONASS-M №732) (Russia) Kosmos 2461 (GLONASS-M №735)		Medium Earth		Success
535-40	GLONASS-M launch							
935-14	20 March 2010; 18:26:57	Proton-M/Briz-M	Site 200/39	(United States) EchoStar XIV		Geosynchronous transfer	EchoStar	Success
935-14	Launch under ILS							
935-11	24 April 2010; 11:19:00	Proton-M/Briz-M	Site 200/39	(United States) SES-1		Geosynchronous transfer	SES	Success
935-11	Commercial launch conducted by International Launch Services, Communications							
935-12	3 June 2010; 22:00:08	Proton-M/Briz-M	Site 200/39	(Saudi Arabia) Arabsat-5B (Badr-5)		Geosynchronous transfer	Arabsat	Success
935-12	Commercial launch conducted by International Launch Services, Communications							
935-15	10 July 2010; 18:40:36	Proton-M/Briz-M	Site 200/39	(United States) EchoStar XV		Geosynchronous transfer	EchoStar	Success
935-15	Commercial launch conducted by International Launch Services, Communications							
535-30	2 September 2010; 00:53:50	Proton-M/DM-2	Site 81/24	(Russia) Kosmos 2464 (GLONASS-M №736) (Russia) Kosmos 2465 (GLONASS-M №737) (Russia) Kosmos 2466 (GLONASS-M №738)		Medium Earth		Success
535-30	GLONASS-M launch							
935-16	14 October 2010; 18:53:21	Proton-M/Briz-M	Site 81/24	(United States) XM-5		Geosynchronous transfer	XM Satellite Radio Holdings	Success
935-16	Commercial launch conducted by International Launch Services, Communications							
935-13	14 November 2010; 17:29:20	Proton-M/Briz-M	Site 200/39	(Canada) SkyTerra-1		Geosynchronous transfer	SkyTerra	Success
935-13	Commercial launch conducted by International Launch Services, Communications							
535-37	5 December 2010; 10:25:19	Proton-M/DM-03	Site 81/24	(Russia) GLONASS-M №739, 740, 741		Medium Earth (intended)		Failure
535-37	First flight of the Blok-DM-03 upper stage. The upper stage and payloads failed to reach orbital velocity due to overloading of the upper stage with 1.5 tonnes of liquid oxygen, which was caused by communication error between engineers.							
935-17	26 December 2010; 21:51:00	Proton-M/Briz-M	Site 200/39	(France) KA-SAT		Geosynchronous transfer	Eutelsat	Success
935-17	Commercial launch conducted by International Launch Services, Communications							
935-67	30 July 2020; 21:25:19	Proton-M / Briz-M	Site 200/39	(Russia) Ekspress-80 (Russia) Ekspress-103	4390 kg total 2110 kg and 2280 kg	Geosynchronous transfer	RSCC	Success
935-67	Communications satellites launch							
535-45	21 July 2021; 14:58	Proton-M	Site 200/39	(Russia) Nauka	20200 kg	Low Earth (ISS)	Roscosmos	Success
535-45	ISS module launch							
535-46	13 December 2021; 12:07	Proton-M / Briz-M	Site 200/39	(Russia) Ekspress-AMU3 (Russia) Ekspress-AMU7	4130 kg total 1980 kg and 2150 kg	Geosynchronous	RSCC	Success
535-46	Communications satellites							
935-71	12 October 2022 15:00	Proton-M / DM-03	Site 81/24	(Angola) AngoSat-2	1964kg	Geosynchronous	GGPEN	Success
935-71	Communications satellite launch							
935-70	5 February 2023 09:12:51	Proton-M / DM-03	Site 81/24	(Russia) Elektro-L №4	3000kg	Geosynchronous	Roscosmos	Success
935-70	Weather satellite launch							
935-73	12 March 2023 23:12:59	Proton-M / Briz-M	Site 200/39	(Russia) Olymp-K №2	3000kg	Geosynchronous	Roscosmos	Success
935-73	SIGINT satellite launch							
935-68	12 February 2026 08:52:15	Proton-M / DM-03	Site 81/24	(Russia) Elektro-L №5 (Iran) Jame-e-Jam 1	3000kg	Geosynchronous	Roscosmos	Success
935-68	Last launch of Proton-M/DM-03 configuration and future launch using DM-03 will be on Angara A5.							

=== Planned launches ===
Date / time (UTC)	Rocket Configuration	Launch site	Payload	Payload type	Orbit	Users
2026	Proton-M / Briz-M	Baikonur	(Iran) Ekvator	Communications	Geosynchronous	ISA
2026	Communications satellite built by ISS Reshetnev for Iran.					
2026	Proton-M / Briz-M	Baikonur	(Russia) Ekspress-AMU4	Communications	Geosynchronous	RSCC
2026	Proton-M / Briz-M	Baikonur	(Russia) Yamal-501 (Russia) Luch-5VM №1	Communications	Geosynchronous	Gazprom Space Systems; Gonets Satellite System
2029	Proton-M / Briz-M	Baikonur	(Russia) Ekspress-AMU6	Communications	Geosynchronous	RSCC
2029	Proton-M	Baikonur	(Russia) NEM	Space station module	Low Earth (ISS)	Roscosmos
2029	Science Power Module (NEM) for the future Russian Orbital Station. Originally planned for launch on Proton-M to the ISS, before being transferred to Angara-A5 at 98.0°. In December 2025, the launch was transferred back to Proton-M to the ISS.					

== Gallery ==
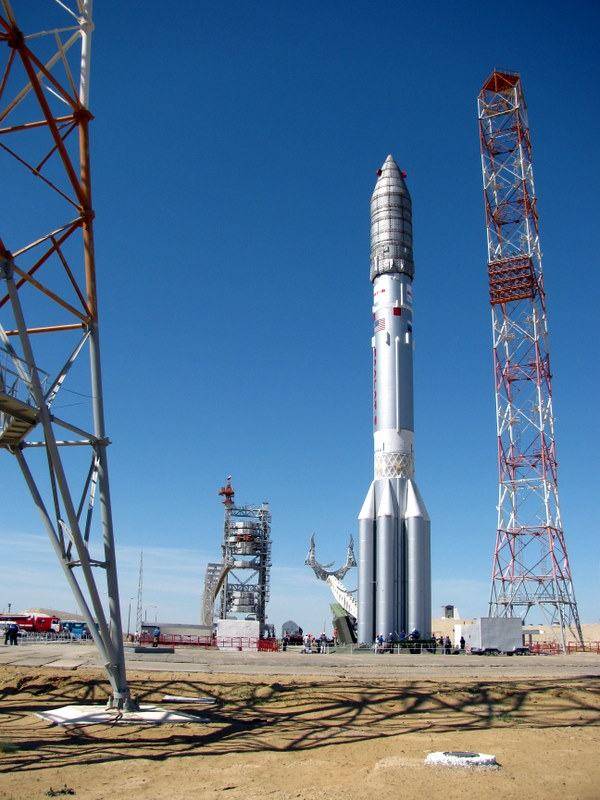
Proton-M rocket on the launchpad at Baikonur Cosmodrome

== See also ==
- Comparison of heavy lift launch systems
- List of Proton launches
