= Baikonur Cosmodrome Site 200 =

Launch site at Baikonur Cosmodrome in Kazakhstan

Coordinates: 46°02′01″N 63°01′44″E

Site 200
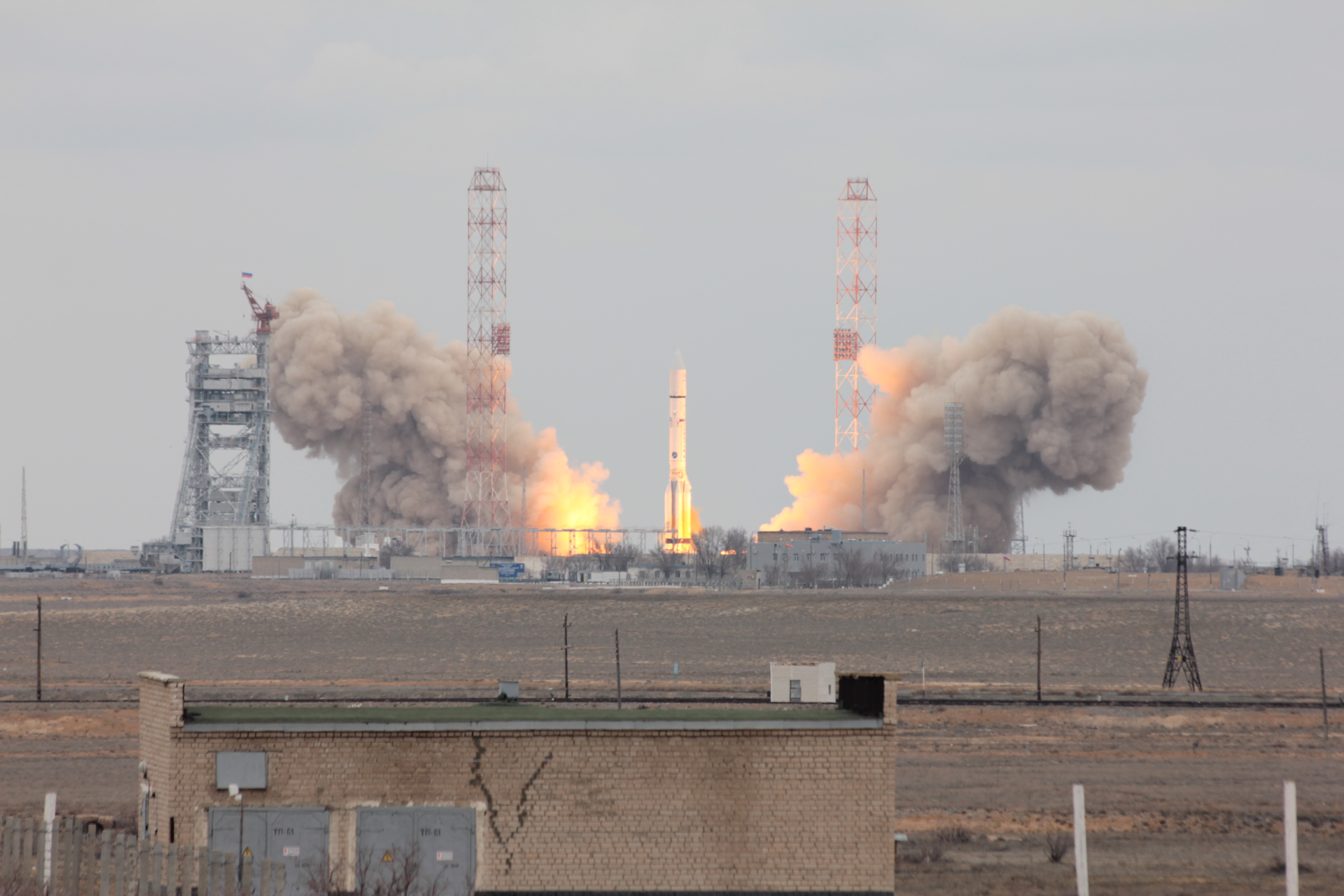
- A Proton-M with the ExoMars on LC-200/39
- Interactive map of Site 200
- Launch site: Baikonur Cosmodrome
- Operator: RVSN, VKS, RKA
- Total launches: 233
- Launch pad: Two
- Orbital inclination range: 49° – 99°
Site 200/39 launch history
- Status: Active
- Launches: 170
- First launch: 20 February 1980; Proton-K/DM / Raduga 6
- Last launch: 12 March 2023; Proton-M / Olymp-K №2
- Associated rockets: Proton-K (retired); Proton-M (active)
Site 200/40 launch history
- Status: Inactive
- Launches: 63
- First launch: 23 July 1977; Proton-K/DM / Raduga 3
- Last launch: 31 March 1991; Proton-K/DM-2 / Almaz 1
- Associated rockets: Proton-K (retired)

Site 200 at the Baikonur Cosmodrome is a launch site in Kazakhstan, used – along with Site 81 – by Proton rockets. It consists of two launch pads, areas 39 and 40. Area 39 is currently (as of 2021) used for Proton-M launches, including commercial flights conducted by International Launch Services. Area 40 is currently (as of 2021) inactive, as it was slated to be rebuilt as a launch site for the Angara rocket. Although the project was relocated to Site 250, Area 40 was not put back into service.

A number of planetary probes have been launched from Site 200. Venera 14, Venera 15, Vega 1, Fobos 1, the failed Mars-96, and ExoMars were launched from area 39. Venera 13, Venera 16, Vega 2, Fobos 2 were launched from Area 40. Area 39 was also the launch site for the core of the Mir space station, along with both Kvant modules, and the Kristall module. Salyut 7 and Granat were launched from Area 40.

On 13 May 2021 the pad was modified to support the launch of Nauka.
