= Information Satellite Systems Reshetnev =

Russian satellite manufacturing company

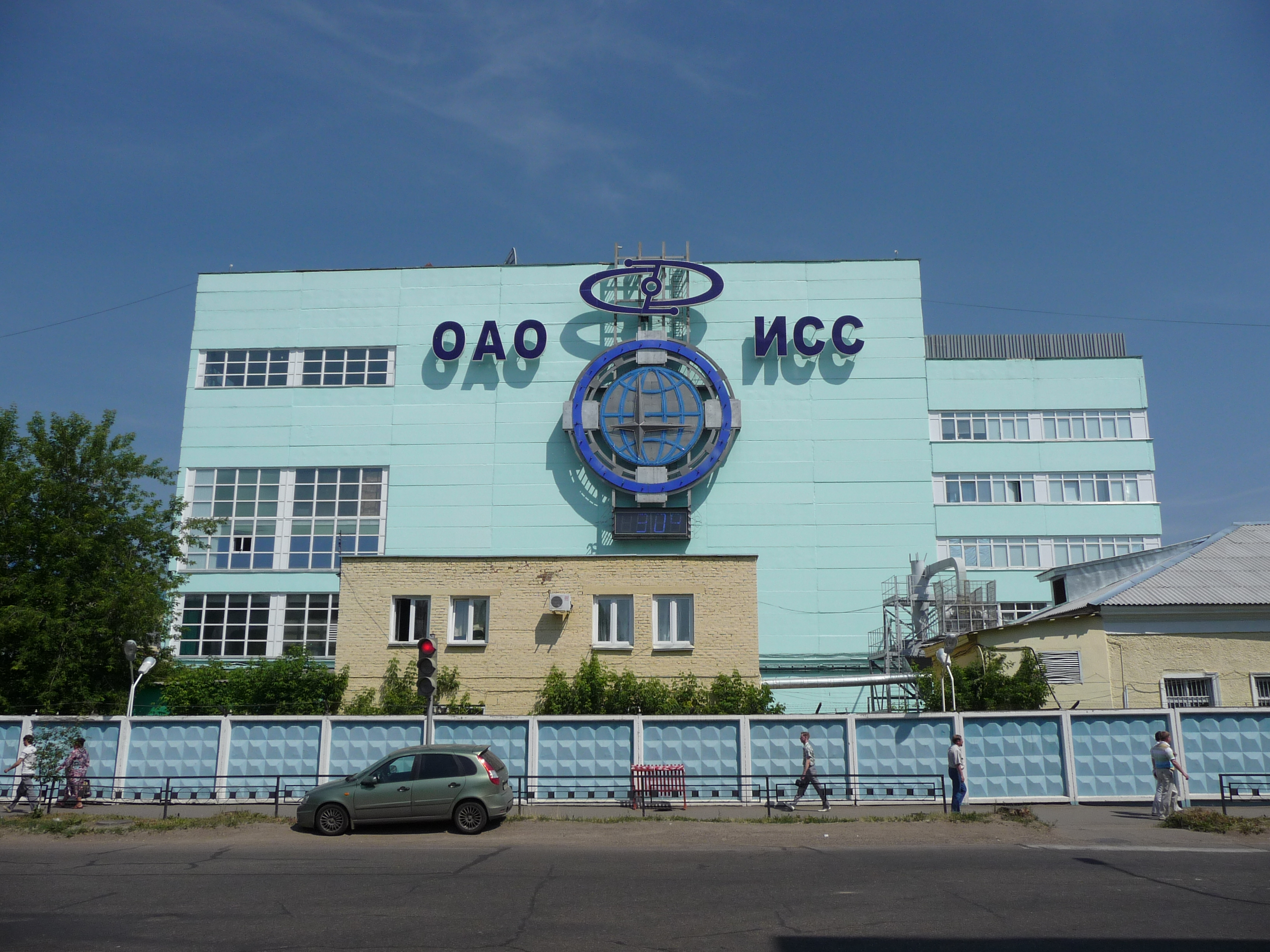
- Information Satellite Systems Reshetnev main building
- Company type: Joint stock company
- Industry: Aerospace
- Founded: 1959
- Headquarters: Zheleznogorsk
- Key people: Nikolai Tostoyedov (Director General)
- Products: Communications satellites
- Revenue: US$625 million
- Number of employees: 8,500
- Parent: Roscosmos
- Website: www.iss-reshetnev.com

JSC Information Satellite Systems Reshetnev (Russian: Информационные спутниковые системы имени академика М. Ф. Решетнёва, romanized: Informatsionnye sputnikovye systemy imeny akademika M. F. Reshetnyova) is a Russian satellite manufacturing company. It is based in the closed city of Krasnoyarsk-26 (today called Zheleznogorsk), Krasnoyarsk Krai near the city of Krasnoyarsk. The company was formerly called NPO PM (short for NPO Prikladnoi Mekhaniki or Applied Mechanics Science-Production Association; NPO stands for Nauchno-proizvodstvennoye obyedineniye, Scientific Production Association).

== History ==
The company was founded in 1959 by Mikhail Reshetnev as the Eastern office of OKB-1. During its history, it has built 27 different space systems and over a thousand individual satellites. In particular, the company was responsible for designing the GLONASS satellite navigation system.

After the dissolution of the Soviet Union, the company lost most of its state financing, and its work force of 8,000 was cut almost in half. In 1995, Information Satellite System signed a co-operation agreement with the French company Thales Alenia Space.

In 2000, the Russian government launched a substantial investment program to revive GLONASS satellite constellation, which provided a massive boost for the company's financial situation.

The company was sanctioned by the US Office of Foreign Assets Control on 15 September 2022 by being added to the OFAC list of "Specially Designated Nationals".

== Products ==
Information Satellite Systems designs and manufactures communications-, TV broadcasting-, navigation- and geodetic satellites. The company is capable of providing a full range of services for the whole lifetime of a satellite mission, including ground-testing, integration and orbital control. In addition, the company also produces ground antennas for satellite communication.

Current activities include being the prime developer of the GLONASS satellite positioning system, and production of the Ekspress series of communications satellites. In addition to communications satellites, the company also produces research spacecraft, such as the Yubileiny research satellite, which was launched in May, 2008.

== Economic aspects ==
The company currently employs about 8,500 people. The company's annual operating budget is 20 billion rubles (US$625 million), of which two-thirds comes from state orders, and a third from commercial orders. Salaries at Information Satellite Systems are twice the national average for engineering graduates. It is the largest satellite producer of the Russian space industry.
