= Russian Satellite Communications Company =

Russian communications satellite company

- Native name: ФГУП «Космическая связь»
- Type: Federal state unitary enterprise
- Industry: Telecommunications
- Founded: 4 November 1967
- Founder: Ministry of Communications of the USSR
- Headquarters: Nikoloyamsky lane, 3A, building 1, Moscow, Russia
- Website: rscc.ru

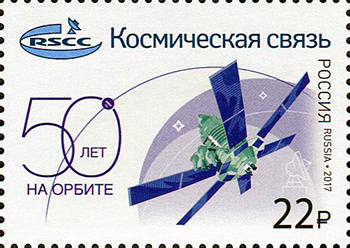
Postage stamp of Russia, 2017

Federal State Unitary Enterprise Satellite Communications (Russian: ФГУП «Космическая связь») or Russian Satellite Communications Company is the main state operator of communications satellites. It is the Russian operator for the international satellite communications systems Intelsat, Eutelsat and Intersputnik, cooperating with these organizations and handling international account settlements.

As the national satellite operator, RSCC meets the important state tasks on providing mobile presidential and governmental communications, federal TV and Radio signal transmission over the territory of Russia and the most countries of the world.

== History ==
In 1965-1967, 20 Orbita Earth stations were built and put into operation in the eastern regions of the USSR, which were used to broadcast central television programs. November 4, 1967, when broadcasts of central television programs in the Orbita system became regular, is considered the company's birthday. In 1968, by order of the Ministry of Communications of the USSR, the Space Communications Station was established, which was then transformed into the state enterprise Space Communications. On April 19, 2001, GPKS received the status of a federal state unitary enterprise (RSCC).

== Assets ==
The RSCC, an arm of the Ministry of Communications and Mass Media, is the leading Russian satellite communications operator. The company possesses the largest satellite constellation in Russia located in the geostationary orbital arc from 14° West to 140° East and cover the whole territory of Russia, the Commonwealth of Independent States (CIS), Europe, the Middle East, Africa, the Asia-Pacific region, North and South America, and Australia.

The company owns teleports located in Medvezhy Ozera (Russian: Медвежьи озера), Vladimir, Dubna Skolkovo, Zheleznogorsk, Khabarovsk and the Shabolovka Technical Center in Moscow which ensure the transmission of channels to all five time zones in Russia via the space vehicles of RTRN, as well as its own high-speed optical-fiber digital network.

== Activity ==
RSCC provides communications services worldwide, has the largest orbital constellation of geostationary communications and broadcasting satellites in Russia and an extensive ground infrastructure of satellite communications centers and fiber-optic communication lines. The company's services include television and radio broadcasting, telephone communications, high-speed data transmission and broadband Internet access, videoconferencing, and the creation of corporate networks.

As part of the Federal Target Program "Development of Television and Radio Broadcasting in the Russian Federation for 2009-2018", RSCC carries out satellite television broadcasting in MPEG-4 standard from the Federal Multiplexing Center in Moscow (37 Shabolovka St.), the first (RTRN-1) and the second (RTRN-2) multiplexes for reception and subsequent transmission in terrestrial DVB-T2 digital terrestrial television networks of the Russian Television and Radio Broadcasting Network (RTRN).

== Ground infrastructure ==
- Dubna Space Communications Center. It was commissioned in 1980 by order of the USSR Minister of Communications as an Olympic facility.
- CCS "Bear Lakes" was commissioned on November 2, 1967.
- The Shabolovka Technical Center was established in 1980 and has been operating as a technical service since 1994.
- The CCC Zheleznogorsk was organized in May 2004.
- The Skolkovo CCC was established in October 2003.
- The Khabarovsk CCC has been operating since 2004.
- SSS "Vladimir". It was commissioned in 1971. Until 2008, he was a Space Communications Center.

== Owners and management ==
CEO - Volin Aleksey Konstantinovich.
