= 2012 in spaceflight =

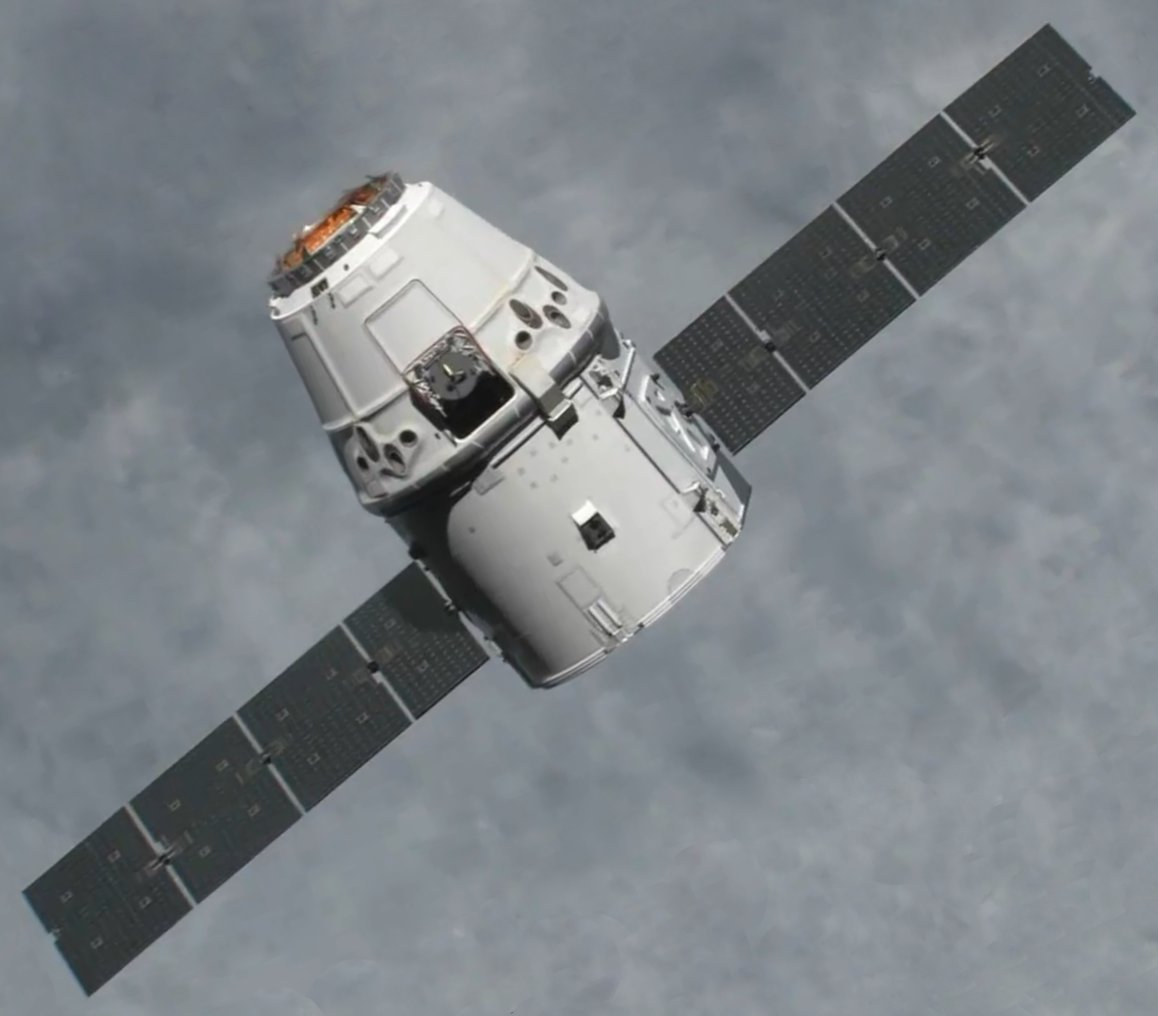
- The Dragon spacecraft (pictured) conducted the first COTS demonstration logistics flight in May 2012, becoming the first commercial spacecraft to rendezvous with the International Space Station.

Orbital launches
- First: 9 January
- Last: 19 December
- Total: 77
- Successes: 72
- Failures: 2
- Partial failures: 3
- Catalogued: 75

National firsts
- Satellite: Hungary; Poland; Romania; Belarus; North Korea
- Orbital launch: North Korea

Rockets
- Maiden flights: Delta IV-M+ (5,2); Unha-3; Vega
- Retirements: Long March 3B; Long March 3C; Proton-K

Crewed flights
- Orbital: 5
- Total travellers: 15
- EVAs: 5

2012 in spaceflight

The year 2012 saw a number of significant events in spaceflight. In May and October, the first Commercial Orbital Transportation Services resupply missions took place, during which the SpaceX Dragon became the first private spacecraft to dock with the International Space Station (ISS). In June, China launched the crewed Shenzhou 9 orbital mission, and North Korea achieved its first successful orbital launch in December. 2012 also saw China's first successful asteroid exploration mission, and the landing of NASA's Curiosity rover on Mars. The Vega and Unha-3 rockets made their maiden flights in 2012, while the Proton-K made its last.

A total of 77 orbital launches were attempted in 2012, of which 72 were successful, three were partially successful and two were failures. Five crewed orbital missions were conducted over the course of the year, all successfully, carrying a total of 15 individuals into orbit. The year also saw five EVAs by ISS astronauts. The majority of the year's orbital launches were conducted by Russia, China and the United States, with 29, 19 and 13 launches respectively. A total of 139 payloads were launched during the year, including communication and navigation satellites, logistics spacecraft and scientific probes. Additionally, a large number of suborbital sounding rockets and ballistic missiles were launched by scientific and military organisations.

== Overview of orbital spaceflight ==
A total of 77 orbital launches were attempted in 2012, with 72 being reported as successful, and a total of 139 payloads launched. The three most prolific spacefaring nations were Russia, with 29 launches and 27 successes; China, with 19 launches, all of which succeeded; and the United States, with 13 launches, of which 12 succeeded and one was a partial failure. European nations conducted eight orbital launches, all successfully, while India and Japan conducted two each, also successfully. Iran and North Korea both achieved one successful orbital launch during 2012, but Iran also suffered one launch failures, while North Korea suffered one.

=== Crewed spaceflight ===
Five crewed orbital launches were conducted during 2012, all successfully, carrying a total of 15 astronauts into orbit. Four of these missions were flown using Russian Soyuz spacecraft, while the fifth was a Chinese Shenzhou launch. All of the year's crewed missions rendezvoused with space stations – the four Soyuz missions docked with the International Space Station (ISS), while China's Shenzhou 9 docked with the Tiangong-1 orbital laboratory. Five spacewalks were also undertaken in 2012, all by ISS crewmembers.

=== Robotic exploration ===
Numerous significant milestones in robotic spaceflight occurred in 2012, including the landing of NASA's Curiosity rover on Mars in August, and the first commercial resupply missions to the ISS in May and October. The latter also marked the first fully operational use of SpaceX's Dragon spacecraft. Elsewhere in the Solar System, NASA's Dawn spacecraft completed its mission to 4 Vesta in September 2012, while China achieved its first asteroid flyby in December.

== Orbital launches ==
- ← Jan
- Feb
- Mar
- Apr
- May
- Jun
- Jul
- Aug
- Sep
- Oct
- Nov
- Dec →

Date and time (UTC)	Rocket	Flight number	Launch site		LSP	
Date and time (UTC)	Payload (⚀ = CubeSat)	Operator	Orbit	Function	Decay (UTC)	Outcome
Date and time (UTC)	Remarks					
=== January ===
9 January; 03:17:09	(China) Long March 4B		(China) Taiyuan LC-9		(China) SAST	
9 January; 03:17:09	(China) Ziyuan 3	MLR	Low Earth (SSO)	Earth observation	In orbit	Operational
9 January; 03:17:09	(Luxembourg) VesselSat-2	Luxspace	Low Earth (SSO)	Communications	27 October 2016	Successful
13 January; 00:56:04	(China) Long March 3A		(China) Xichang LC-3		(China) CALT	
13 January; 00:56:04	(China) Fengyun 2-07	CMA	Geosynchronous	Meteorology	In orbit	Operational
20 January; 00:38:00	(United States) Delta IV-M+ (5,4)		(United States) Cape Canaveral SLC-37B		(United States) United Launch Alliance	
20 January; 00:38:00	(United States) USA-233 (WGS-4)	U.S. Air Force	Geosynchronous	Communications	In orbit	Operational
25 January; 23:06:40	(Russia) Soyuz-U		(Kazakhstan) Baikonur Site 1/5		(Russia) Roscosmos	
25 January; 23:06:40	(Russia) Progress M-14M / 46P	Roscosmos	Low Earth (ISS)	ISS logistics	28 April; 13:46	Successful
← Jan; Feb; Mar; Apr; May; Jun; Jul; Aug; Sep; Oct; Nov; Dec →; === February ===
3 February; 00:04	(Iran) Safir-1B	ERS.2002	(Iran) Semnan LP-1		(Iran) ISA	
3 February; 00:04	(Iran) Navid	ISA	Low Earth	Earth observation	1 April	Successful
13 February; 10:00:00	(Italy) Vega		(France) Kourou ELV		(France) Arianespace	
13 February; 10:00:00	(Italy) LARES	ASI	Low Earth	Geodesy	In orbit	Operational
13 February; 10:00:00	(Italy) ALMASat-1	Università di Bologna	Low Earth	Technology demonstration	In orbit	Operational
13 February; 10:00:00	⚀ (Spain) Xatcobeo	Vigo/INTA	Low Earth	Technology demonstration	31 August 2014	Successful
13 February; 10:00:00	⚀ (Italy) UniCubeSat-GG	Rome	Low Earth	Atmospheric science	16 February 2015	Successful
13 February; 10:00:00	⚀ (France) Robusta	Montpellier	Low Earth	Technology demonstration	28 January 2015	Partial spacecraft failure
13 February; 10:00:00	⚀ (Italy) e-st@r	Torino	Low Earth	Technology demonstration	16 January 2015	Partial spacecraft failure
13 February; 10:00:00	⚀ (Romania) Goliat	Bucharest	Low Earth	Technology demonstration	31 December 2014	Partial spacecraft failure
13 February; 10:00:00	⚀ (Poland) PW-Sat	Warsaw	Low Earth	Technology demonstration	28 October 2014	Successful
13 February; 10:00:00	⚀ (Hungary) MaSat-1	BME	Low Earth	Technology demonstration	9 January 2015	Successful
13 February; 10:00:00	Maiden flight of Vega rocket; all payloads CubeSats except LARES and ALMASat-1. First Hungarian, Romanian and Polish satellites.					
14 February; 19:36:37	(Russia) Proton-M / Briz-M Enhanced		(Kazakhstan) Baikonur Site 200/39		(Russia) (United States) International Launch Services	
14 February; 19:36:37	(Netherlands) SES-4	SES World Skies	Geosynchronous	Communications	In orbit	Operational
24 February; 16:12:04	(China) Long March 3C		(China) Xichang LC-2		(China) CALT	
24 February; 16:12:04	(China) Compass-G5	CNSA	Geosynchronous	Navigation	In orbit	Operational
24 February; 22:15:00	(United States) Atlas V 551		(United States) Cape Canaveral SLC-41		(United States) United Launch Alliance	
24 February; 22:15:00	(United States) MUOS-1	U.S. Navy	Geosynchronous	Communications	In orbit	Operational
← Jan; Feb; Mar; Apr; May; Jun; Jul; Aug; Sep; Oct; Nov; Dec →; === March ===
23 March; 04:34:05	(France) Ariane 5 ES		(France) Kourou ELA-3		(France) Arianespace	
23 March; 04:34:05	Edoardo Amaldi ATV	ESA	Low Earth (ISS)	ISS logistics	3 October; 01:23	Successful
25 March; 12:10:32	(Russia) Proton-M / Briz-M Enhanced		(Kazakhstan) Baikonur Site 200/39		(Russia) (United States) International Launch Services	
25 March; 12:10:32	(United States) Intelsat 22	Intelsat	Geosynchronous	Communications	In orbit	Operational
30 March; 05:49:32	(Russia) Proton-K / DM-2		(Kazakhstan) Baikonur Site 81/24		(Russia) RVSN RF	
30 March; 05:49:32	(Russia) Kosmos 2479 (US-KMO)	VKO	Geosynchronous	Missile defense	In orbit	Operational
30 March; 05:49:32	Final flight of Proton-K, final US-KMO satellite.					
31 March; 10:27:04	(China) Long March 3B/E		(China) Xichang LC-2		(China) CALT	
31 March; 10:27:04	(China) Apstar-7	APT Satellite Holdings	Geosynchronous	Communication	In orbit	Operational
← Jan; Feb; Mar; Apr; May; Jun; Jul; Aug; Sep; Oct; Nov; Dec →; === April ===
3 April; 23:12:57	(United States) Delta IV-M+(5,2)		(United States) Vandenberg SLC-6		(United States) United Launch Alliance	
3 April; 23:12:57	(United States) USA-234 (FIA-R)	NRO	Low Earth	Reconnaissance	In orbit	Operational
3 April; 23:12:57	NRO Launch 25					
12 April; 22:38:55	(North Korea) Unha-3		(North Korea) Sohae		(North Korea) KCST	
12 April; 22:38:55	(North Korea) Kwangmyŏngsŏng-3	KCST	Intended: Low Earth	Technology demonstration	12 April	Launch failure
12 April; 22:38:55	Probable first stage failure, disintegrated over the Yellow Sea.					
20 April; 12:50:24	(Russia) Soyuz-U		(Kazakhstan) Baikonur Site 31/6		(Russia) Roscosmos	
20 April; 12:50:24	(Russia) Progress M-15M / 47P	Roscosmos	Low Earth (ISS)	ISS logistics	20 August 2012	Successful
23 April; 22:18:13	(Russia) Proton-M / Briz-M Enhanced		(Kazakhstan) Baikonur Site 200/39		(Russia) (United States) International Launch Services	
23 April; 22:18:13	(United Arab Emirates) Yahsat 1B	Yahsat	Geosynchronous	Communications	In orbit	Operational
26 April; 00:17	(India) PSLV-XL		(India) Satish Dhawan Space Centre FLP		(India) ISRO	
26 April; 00:17	(India) RISAT-1	ISRO	Low Earth (SSO)	Earth observation	In orbit	Operational
29 April; 20:50:03	(China) Long March 3B		(China) Xichang LC-2		(China) CALT	
29 April; 20:50:03	(China) Compass-M3	CNSA	Medium Earth	Navigation	In orbit	Operational
29 April; 20:50:03	(China) Compass-M4	CNSA	Medium Earth	Navigation	In orbit	Operational
← Jan; Feb; Mar; Apr; May; Jun; Jul; Aug; Sep; Oct; Nov; Dec →; === May ===
4 May; 18:42:00	(United States) Atlas V 531		(United States) Cape Canaveral SLC-41		(United States) United Launch Alliance	
4 May; 18:42:00	(United States) USA-235 (AEHF-2)	U.S. Air Force	Geosynchronous	Communications	In orbit	Operational
6 May; 07:10:04	(China) Long March 2D		(China) Jiuquan SLS-2		(China) SAST	
6 May; 07:10:04	(China) Tianhui 1B	CNSA	Low Earth (SSO)	Earth observation	In orbit	Operational
10 May; 07:06:04	(China) Long March 4B		(China) Taiyuan LC-9		(China) SAST	
10 May; 07:06:04	(China) Yaogan 14	CNSA	Low Earth (SSO)	Reconnaissance	In orbit	Operational
10 May; 07:06:04	(China) Tiantuo 1	NUDT	Low Earth (SSO)	Technology demonstration	3 November 2014	Successful
15 May; 03:01:23	(Russia) Soyuz-FG		(Kazakhstan) Baikonur Site 1/5		(Russia) Roscosmos	
15 May; 03:01:23	(Russia) Soyuz TMA-04M	Roscosmos	Low Earth (ISS)	Expedition 31/32	17 September; 02:53	Successful
15 May; 03:01:23	Crewed flight					
15 May; 22:13:07	(France) Ariane 5 ECA		(France) Kourou ELA-3		(France) Arianespace	
15 May; 22:13:07	(Japan) JCSAT-13	SKY Perfect JSAT Group	Geosynchronous	Communications	In orbit	Operational
15 May; 22:13:07	(Vietnam) Vinasat-2	VNPT	Geosynchronous	Communications	In orbit	Operational
17 May; 14:05	(Russia) Soyuz-U		(Russia) Plesetsk Site 16/2		(Russia) VKO	
17 May; 14:05	(Russia) Kosmos 2480 (Kobalt-M No.8)	VKO	Low Earth	Reconnaissance	24 September	Successful
17 May; 14:05	Final Soyuz-U launch from Plesetsk.					
17 May; 16:39	(Japan) H-IIA		(Japan) Tanegashima LA-Y1		(Japan) MHI	
17 May; 16:39	(Japan) (United States) GCOM-W1	JAXA / NASA	Low Earth (SSO)	Earth observation	In orbit	Operational
17 May; 16:39	(South Korea) Arirang-3	KARI	Low Earth (SSO)	Earth observation	In orbit	Operational
17 May; 16:39	(Japan) SDS-4	JAXA	Low Earth (SSO)	Technology demonstration	In orbit	Successful
17 May; 16:39	(Japan) Horyu-2	KIT	Low Earth (SSO)	Technology demonstration Amateur radio	In orbit	Successful
17 May; 19:12:14	(Russia) Proton-M / Briz-M		(Kazakhstan) Baikonur Site 81/24		(Russia) (United States) International Launch Services	
17 May; 19:12:14	(Canada) Nimiq 6	Telesat	Geosynchronous	Communications	In orbit	Operational
22 May; 07:44:38	(United States) Falcon 9 v1.0		(United States) Cape Canaveral SLC-40		(United States) SpaceX	
22 May; 07:44:38	(United States) Dragon C2+	SpaceX / NASA	Low Earth (ISS)	Flight test ISS logistics	31 May; 16:42	Successful
22 May; 07:44:38	(United States) New Frontier	Celestis	Low Earth	Space burial	27 June	Successful
22 May; 07:44:38	COTS Demo 2+, orbital test manoeuvres and ISS rendezvous, berthing and cargo delivery. First commercial spacecraft to visit the ISS. Celestis payload, containing cremated remains of 308 people including Gordon Cooper and James Doohan, remained intentionally attached to the upper stage.					
23 May	(Iran) Safir-1B		(Iran) Semnan		(Iran) ISA	
23 May	(Iran) Fajr	ISA	Planned: Low Earth	Earth observation	23 May	Launch failure
23 May	Probable launch failure; identity of launch attempt, rocket, satellite and launch time not confirmed.					
26 May; 15:56:04	(China) Long March 3B/E		(China) Xichang LC-2		(China) CALT	
26 May; 15:56:04	(China) Chinasat-2A	China Satcom	Geosynchronous	Communications	In orbit	Operational
29 May; 07:31:05	(China) Long March 4C		(China) Taiyuan LC-9		(China) SAST	
29 May; 07:31:05	(China) Yaogan 15	CNSA	Low Earth (SSO)	Reconnaissance	In orbit	Operational
← Jan; Feb; Mar; Apr; May; Jun; Jul; Aug; Sep; Oct; Nov; Dec →; === June ===
1 June; 05:22:59	(Ukraine) Zenit-3SL		(Norway) Ocean Odyssey		(United Nations) Sea Launch	
1 June; 05:22:59	(United States) Intelsat 19	Intelsat	Geosynchronous	Communications	In orbit	Partial spacecraft failure
1 June; 05:22:59	Second solar panel initially failed to deploy after launch. It eventually deployed, but was damaged.					
13 June; 16:00:37	(United States) Pegasus-XL		(Marshall Islands) Stargazer, Kwajalein Atoll		(United States) Orbital Sciences	
13 June; 16:00:37	(United States) NuSTAR	NASA	Low Earth	X-ray astronomy	In orbit	Operational
16 June; 10:37:24	(China) Long March 2F	Y9	(China) Jiuquan LA-4/SLS-1		(China) CALT	
16 June; 10:37:24	(China) Shenzhou 9	CMSA	Low Earth (Tiangong-1)	Technology demonstration	29 June; 02:01	Successful
16 June; 10:37:24	(China) Shenzhou-9-GC (Orbital Module)	CMSA	Low Earth (Tiangong-1)	Space rendezvous	2 December	Successful
16 June; 10:37:24	Crewed flight; first Chinese woman in space, and first crewed mission to Tiangong-1.					
20 June; 12:28	(United States) Atlas V 401		(United States) Cape Canaveral SLC-41		(United States) United Launch Alliance	
20 June; 12:28	(United States) USA-236 / SDS-3	NRO	Geosynchronous	Communications	In orbit	Operational
20 June; 12:28	NROL-38 mission.					
29 June; 13:15	(United States) Delta IV Heavy		(United States) Cape Canaveral SLC-37B		(United States) United Launch Alliance	
29 June; 13:15	(United States) USA-237 / Orion 8	NRO	Geosynchronous	ELINT	In orbit	Operational
29 June; 13:15	NROL-15 mission. First flight of Delta IV with RS-68A engines.					
← Jan; Feb; Mar; Apr; May; Jun; Jul; Aug; Sep; Oct; Nov; Dec →; === July ===
5 July; 21:36:07	(France) Ariane 5 ECA		(France) Kourou ELA-3		(France) Arianespace	
5 July; 21:36:07	(United States) Echostar XVII	Hughes Network Systems	Geosynchronous	Communications	In orbit	Operational
5 July; 21:36:07	MSG 3	EUMETSAT	Geosynchronous	Meteorology	In orbit	Operational
9 July; 18:38:30	(Russia) Proton-M / Briz-M Enhanced		(Kazakhstan) Baikonur Site 81/24		(Russia) (United States) International Launch Services	
9 July; 18:38:30	(Luxembourg) SES-5	SES	Geosynchronous	Communications	In orbit	Operational
15 July; 02:40:03	(Russia) Soyuz-FG		(Kazakhstan) Baikonur Site 1/5		(Russia) Roscosmos	
15 July; 02:40:03	(Russia) Soyuz TMA-05M	Roscosmos	Low Earth (ISS)	Expedition 32/33	19 November; 01:56	Successful
15 July; 02:40:03	Crewed flight					
21 July; 02:06:18	(Japan) H-IIB		(Japan) Tanegashima LA-Y2		(Japan) JAXA	
21 July; 02:06:18	(Japan) Kounotori 3	JAXA	Low Earth (ISS)	ISS logistics	14 September	Successful
21 July; 02:06:18	⚀ (Japan) Raiko	Wakayama/Tohuku	Low Earth	Technology demonstration	6 August 2013	Successful
21 July; 02:06:18	⚀ (Japan) FITSAT-1 (Niwaka)	FIT	Low Earth	Technology demonstration	4 July 2013	Successful
21 July; 02:06:18	⚀ (Japan) We-Wish	Meisei Electric	Low Earth	Technology demonstration	11 March 2013	Successful
21 July; 02:06:18	⚀ (Vietnam) F-1	FPT	Low Earth	Technology demonstration	May 2013	Successfully deployed, but no signal was received.
21 July; 02:06:18	⚀ (United States) TechEdSat	San Jose	Low Earth	Technology demonstration	5 May 2013	Successful
21 July; 02:06:18	All payloads CubeSats other than Kounotori 3. CubeSats carried aboard Kounotori and deployed from the ISS.					
22 July; 06:41:39	(Russia) Soyuz-FG / Fregat		(Kazakhstan) Baikonur Site 31/6		(Russia) Roscosmos	
22 July; 06:41:39	(Russia) Kanopus V-1	Roscosmos	Low Earth (SSO)	Earth observation	In orbit	Operational
22 July; 06:41:39	(Belarus) BelKA-2	NASRB	Low Earth (SSO)	Earth observation	In orbit	Operational
22 July; 06:41:39	(Russia) Zond-PP	Roscosmos	Low Earth (SSO)	Technology demonstration Earth observation	In orbit	Spacecraft failure
22 July; 06:41:39	(Germany) TET-1	DLR	Low Earth (SSO)	Technology demonstration	18 November 2022	Successful
22 July; 06:41:39	(Canada) exactView 1	exactEarth	Low Earth (SSO)	AIS ship tracking	In orbit	Operational
22 July; 06:41:39	First Belarusian satellite.					
25 July; 15:43:04	(China) Long March 3C		(China) Xichang LC-2		(China) CALT	
25 July; 15:43:04	(China) Tianlian I-03	CNSA	Geosynchronous	Communications	In orbit	Operational
28 July; 01:35:34	(Russia) Rokot / Briz-KM		(Russia) Plesetsk Site 133/3		(Russia) VKO	
28 July; 01:35:34	(Russia) Gonets M-3	Gonets Satellite System	Low Earth	Communications	In orbit	Operational
28 July; 01:35:34	(Russia) Gonets M-4	Gonets Satellite System	Low Earth	Communications	In orbit	Operational
28 July; 01:35:34	(Russia) Kosmos 2481 (Strela-3M)	VKO	Low Earth	Communications	In orbit	Operational
28 July; 01:35:34	(Russia) MiR (Yubileiny 2)	NPO PM	Low Earth	Amateur radio Technology demonstration	In orbit	Operational
← Jan; Feb; Mar; Apr; May; Jun; Jul; Aug; Sep; Oct; Nov; Dec →; === August ===
1 August; 19:35:13	(Russia) Soyuz-U		(Kazakhstan) Baikonur Site 1/5		(Russia) Roscosmos	
1 August; 19:35:13	(Russia) Progress M-16M / 48P	Roscosmos	Low Earth (ISS)	ISS logistics	9 February 2013	Successful
1 August; 19:35:13	(Russia) Sfera-53	Roscosmos	Low Earth	Atmospheric density	24 November	Successful
1 August; 19:35:13	Fast rendezvous test; Sfera-53 deployed from ISS at 18:29 UTC on 20 August during a spacewalk.					
2 August; 20:54	(France) Ariane 5 ECA		(France) Kourou ELA-3		(France) Arianespace	
2 August; 20:54	(United States) Intelsat 20	Intelsat	Geosynchronous	Communications	In orbit	Operational
2 August; 20:54	(United Kingdom) HYLAS-2	Avanti	Geosynchronous	Communications	In orbit	Operational
6 August; 19:31:00	(Russia) Proton-M / Briz-M Enhanced		(Kazakhstan) Baikonur Site 81/24		(Russia) Khrunichev	
6 August; 19:31:00	(Indonesia) Telkom-3	PT Telkom	Planned: Geosynchronous; Achieved: Medium Earth	Communications	5 February 2021	Launch failure
6 August; 19:31:00	(Russia) Ekspress-MD2	RSCC	Planned: Geosynchronous; Achieved: Medium Earth	Communications	In orbit	Launch failure
6 August; 19:31:00	Briz-M stage failure 7 seconds into its third burn. Stage exploded on 16 October, generating over 500 pieces of orbital debris.					
19 August; 06:54:59	(Ukraine) Zenit-3SL		(Norway) Ocean Odyssey		(United Nations) Sea Launch	
19 August; 06:54:59	(United States) Intelsat 21	Intelsat	Geosynchronous	Communications	In orbit	Operational
30 August; 08:05:27	(United States) Atlas V 401		(United States) Cape Canaveral SLC-41		(United States) United Launch Alliance	
30 August; 08:05:27	(United States) Van Allen Probe A (RBSP-A)	NASA	Highly elliptical	Magnetospheric research	12 March 2026; 10:37	Successful
30 August; 08:05:27	(United States) Van Allen Probe B (RBSP-B)	NASA	Highly elliptical	Magnetospheric research	In orbit	Successful
30 August; 08:05:27	Launch of the two Van Allen Probes, formerly known as the Radiation Belt Storm Probes. Van Allen Probe B ceased operations on 19 July 2019; Van Allen Probe A was deactivated on 18 October 2019.					
← Jan; Feb; Mar; Apr; May; Jun; Jul; Aug; Sep; Oct; Nov; Dec →; === September ===
9 September; 04:23	(India) PSLV-CA		(India) Satish Dhawan FLP		(India) ISRO	
9 September; 04:23	(France) SPOT 6	CNES	Low Earth (SSO)	Earth observation	In orbit	Operational
9 September; 04:23	(Japan) PROITERES	Osaka Institute of Technology	Low Earth (SSO)	Amateur radio Technology demonstration	In orbit	Operational
13 September; 21:39:00	(United States) Atlas V 401		(United States) Vandenberg SLC-3E		(United States) United Launch Alliance	
13 September; 21:39:00	(United States) USA-238 (NOSS)	NRO	Low Earth	ELINT	In orbit	Operational
13 September; 21:39:00	(United States) USA-238 (NOSS)	NRO	Low Earth	ELINT	In orbit	Operational
13 September; 21:39:00	⚀ (United States) CINEMA 1	UCB	Low Earth	Magnetospheric research	In orbit	Operational
13 September; 21:39:00	⚀ (United States) CXBN	Morehead	Low Earth	X-ray astronomy	In orbit	Operational
13 September; 21:39:00	⚀ (United States) CP 5	CalPoly	Low Earth	Technology demonstration	In orbit	Operational
13 September; 21:39:00	⚀ (United States) CSSWE	CU-Boulder	Low Earth	Magnetospheric research	In orbit	Operational
13 September; 21:39:00	⚀ (United States) Aeneas	USC / NRO	Low Earth	Technology demonstration	In orbit	Operational
13 September; 21:39:00	⚀ (United States) STARE A	Lawrence Livermore	Low Earth	Technology demonstration	In orbit	Operational
13 September; 21:39:00	⚀ (United States) SMDC-ONE 2.1	U.S. Army	Low Earth	Technology demonstration	In orbit	Operational
13 September; 21:39:00	⚀ (United States) SMDC-ONE 2.2	U.S. Army	Low Earth	Technology demonstration	In orbit	Operational
13 September; 21:39:00	⚀ (United States) AeroCube 4	The Aerospace Corporation	Low Earth	Technology demonstration	In orbit	Operational
13 September; 21:39:00	⚀ (United States) AeroCube 4.5A	The Aerospace Corporation	Low Earth	Technology demonstration	In orbit	Operational
13 September; 21:39:00	⚀ (United States) AeroCube 4.5B	The Aerospace Corporation	Low Earth	Technology demonstration	In orbit	Operational
13 September; 21:39:00	NRO Launch 36					
17 September; 16:28:40	(Russia) Soyuz-2.1a / Fregat		(Kazakhstan) Baikonur Site 31/6		(France) (Russia) Starsem	
17 September; 16:28:40	MetOp-B	EUMETSAT	Low Earth (SSO)	Meteorology	In orbit	Operational
18 September; 19:10:04	(China) Long March 3B/E		(China) Xichang LC-2		(China) CALT	
18 September; 19:10:04	(China) Compass-M5	CNSA	Medium Earth	Navigation	In orbit	Operational
18 September; 19:10:04	(China) Compass-M6	CNSA	Medium Earth	Navigation	In orbit	Operational
28 September; 21:18:07	(France) Ariane 5 ECA		(France) Kourou ELA-3		(France) Arianespace	
28 September; 21:18:07	(Luxembourg) Astra 2F	SES	Geosynchronous	Communications	In orbit	Operational
28 September; 21:18:07	(India) GSAT-10	ISRO	Geosynchronous	Communications	In orbit	Operational
29 September; 04:12:04	(China) Long March 2D		(China) Jiuquan SLS-2		(China) SAST	
29 September; 04:12:04	(Venezuela) VRSS-1	MPPCTII	Low Earth (SSO)	Earth observation	In orbit	Operational
← Jan; Feb; Mar; Apr; May; Jun; Jul; Aug; Sep; Oct; Nov; Dec →; === October ===
4 October; 12:10:00	(United States) Delta IV M+(4,2)		(United States) Cape Canaveral SLC-37B		(United States) United Launch Alliance	
4 October; 12:10:00	(United States) USA-239 (GPS IIF-3)	U.S. Air Force	Medium Earth	Navigation	In orbit	Operational
4 October; 12:10:00	Named after Star Arcturus.					
8 October; 00:35:07	(United States) Falcon 9 v1.0		(United States) Cape Canaveral SLC-40		(United States) SpaceX	
8 October; 00:35:07	(United States) SpaceX CRS-1	NASA	Low Earth (ISS)	ISS logistics	28 October; 19:22	Successful
8 October; 00:35:07	(United States) Orbcomm-2 F1	Orbcomm	Low Earth	Communications	10 October	Launch failure
8 October; 00:35:07	First flight of Commercial Resupply Services programme. First stage engine failure resulted in a too-low orbit for Orbcomm payload; CRS-1 nonetheless placed into correct orbit.					
12 October; 18:15:01	(Russia) Soyuz ST-B / Fregat-MT		(France) Kourou ELS		(France) Arianespace	
12 October; 18:15:01	Galileo IOV 3	ESA	Medium Earth	Navigation	In orbit	Operational
12 October; 18:15:01	Galileo IOV 4	ESA	Medium Earth	Navigation	In orbit	Operational
14 October; 03:25:05	(China) Long March 2C/SMA		(China) Taiyuan LC-9		(China) CALT	
14 October; 03:25:05	(China) Shijian 9A	CNSA	Low Earth (SSO)	Technology demonstration	In orbit	Operational
14 October; 03:25:05	(China) Shijian 9B	CNSA	Low Earth (SSO)	Technology demonstration	In orbit	Operational
14 October; 08:37:00	(Russia) Proton-M / Briz-M Enhanced		(Kazakhstan) Baikonur Site 81/24		(Russia) (United States) International Launch Services	
14 October; 08:37:00	(United States) Intelsat 23	Intelsat	Geosynchronous	Communications	In orbit	Operational
23 October; 10:51:11	(Russia) Soyuz-FG		(Kazakhstan) Baikonur Site 31/6		(Russia) Roscosmos	
23 October; 10:51:11	(Russia) Soyuz TMA-06M	Roscosmos	Low Earth (ISS)	Expedition 33/34	16 March 2013; 03:06	Successful
23 October; 10:51:11	Crewed flight					
25 October; 15:33:04	(China) Long March 3C		(China) Xichang LC-2		(China) CALT	
25 October; 15:33:04	(China) Compass-G6	CNSA	Geosynchronous	Navigation	In orbit	Operational
25 October; 15:33:04	Compass navigation system became commercially operational in Asia-Pacific region in December 2012.					
31 October; 07:41:18	(Russia) Soyuz-U		(Kazakhstan) Baikonur Site 1/5		(Russia) Roscosmos	
31 October; 07:41:18	(Russia) Progress M-17M / 49P	Roscosmos	Low Earth (ISS)	ISS logistics	21 April 2013	Successful
← Jan; Feb; Mar; Apr; May; Jun; Jul; Aug; Sep; Oct; Nov; Dec →; === November ===
2 November; 21:04:00	(Russia) Proton-M / Briz-M Enhanced		(Kazakhstan) Baikonur Site 81/24		(Russia) Roscosmos	
2 November; 21:04:00	(Russia) Luch 5B	Gonets Satellite System	Geosynchronous	Communications	In orbit	Operational
2 November; 21:04:00	(Russia) Yamal-300K	Gazprom	Geosynchronous	Communications	In orbit	Operational
10 November; 21:05:07	(France) Ariane 5 ECA		(France) Kourou ELA-3		(France) Arianespace	
10 November; 21:05:07	(France) Eutelsat 21B	Eutelsat	Geosynchronous	Communications	In orbit	Operational
10 November; 21:05:07	(Brazil) Star One C3	Star One	Geosynchronous	Communications	In orbit	Operational
14 November; 11:42:46	(Russia) Soyuz-2.1a / Fregat		(Russia) Plesetsk Site 43/4		(Russia) VKO	
14 November; 11:42:46	(Russia) Meridian 6	VKO	Molniya	Communications	In orbit	Operational
18 November; 22:53:04	(China) Long March 2C		(China) Taiyuan LC-9		(China) CALT	
18 November; 22:53:04	(China) Huanjing 1C	CNSA	Low Earth (SSO)	Earth observation	1 March 2023	Successful
18 November; 22:53:04	(China) Xinyan 1	CASC	Low Earth (SSO)	Technology demonstration	5 October 2019	Successful
18 November; 22:53:04	(China) Fengniao 1	SAST	Low Earth (SSO)	Technology demonstration	11 January 2024	Successful
18 November; 22:53:04	(China) Fengniao 1A	SAST	Low Earth (SSO)	Technology demonstration	11 January 2024	Deployment failure
20 November; 18:31:00	(Russia) Proton-M / Briz-M Enhanced		(Kazakhstan) Baikonur Site 200/39		(Russia) (United States) International Launch Services	
20 November; 18:31:00	(United States) EchoStar XVI	EchoStar	Geosynchronous	Communications	In orbit	Operational
25 November; 04:06:04	(China) Long March 4C		(China) Jiuquan SLS-2		(China) SAST	
25 November; 04:06:04	(China) Yaogan 16A	CNSA	Low Earth	ELINT	In orbit	Operational
25 November; 04:06:04	(China) Yaogan 16B	CNSA	Low Earth	ELINT	In orbit	Operational
25 November; 04:06:04	(China) Yaogan 16C	CNSA	Low Earth	ELINT	In orbit	Operational
27 November; 10:13:03	(China) Long March 3B/E		(China) Xichang LC-2		(China) CALT	
27 November; 10:13:03	(China) (Sri Lanka) ChinaSat 12 / SupremeSAT-I	China Satcom / SupremeSAT	Geosynchronous	Communications	In orbit	Operational
27 November; 10:13:03	Part of satellite's communications payload was leased to SupremeSAT, a Sri Lankan satellite operator, as SupremeSAT-I.					
← Jan; Feb; Mar; Apr; May; Jun; Jul; Aug; Sep; Oct; Nov; Dec →; === December ===
2 December; 02:02:51	(Russia) Soyuz ST-A / Fregat		(France) Kourou ELS		(France) Arianespace	
2 December; 02:02:51	(France) Pléiades-HR 1B	CNES	Low Earth (SSO)	Earth observation/Reconnaissance	In orbit	Operational
3 December; 20:43:59	(Ukraine) Zenit-3SL		(Norway) Ocean Odyssey		(United Nations) Sea Launch	
3 December; 20:43:59	(France) Eutelsat 70B	Eutelsat	Geosynchronous	Communications	In orbit	Operational
8 December; 13:13:43	(Russia) Proton-M / Briz-M Enhanced		(Kazakhstan) Baikonur Site 200/39		(Russia) (United States) International Launch Services	
8 December; 13:13:43	(Russia) Yamal-402	Gazprom	Geosynchronous	Communications	In orbit	Operational; partial launch failure
8 December; 13:13:43	Briz-M stage failure 4 minutes before scheduled shut down on its fourth burn.					
11 December; 18:03	(United States) Atlas V 501		(United States) Cape Canaveral SLC-41		(United States) United Launch Alliance	
11 December; 18:03	(United States) USA-240 (X-37B OTV-3)	U.S. Air Force	Low Earth	Technology demonstration	17 October 2014	Successful
11 December; 18:03	270-day X-37B endurance mission ultimately extended to over 680 days.					
12 December; 00:49:46	(North Korea) Unha-3		(North Korea) Sohae		(North Korea) KCST	
12 December; 00:49:46	(North Korea) Kwangmyŏngsŏng-3 Unit 2	KCST	Low Earth	Technology demonstration	In orbit	Spacecraft failure
12 December; 00:49:46	First successful North Korean orbital launch, first North Korean satellite; satellite reached orbit but malfunctioned thereafter.					
18 December; 16:13:04	(China) Long March 2D		(China) Jiuquan SLS-2		(China) SAST	
18 December; 16:13:04	(Turkey) Göktürk-2	MSB	Low Earth (SSO)	Earth observation	In orbit	Operational
19 December; 12:12:35	(Russia) Soyuz-FG		(Kazakhstan) Baikonur Site 1/5		(Russia) Roscosmos	
19 December; 12:12:35	(Russia) Soyuz TMA-07M	Roscosmos	Low Earth (ISS)	Expedition 34/35	14 May 2013; 02:31	Successful
19 December; 12:12:35	Crewed flight					
19 December; 21:49:07	(France) Ariane 5 ECA		(France) Kourou ELA-3		(France) Arianespace	
19 December; 21:49:07	(United Kingdom) Skynet 5D	Astrium	Geosynchronous	Communications	In orbit	Operational
19 December; 21:49:07	(Mexico) Mexsat-3	SCT	Geosynchronous	Communications	In orbit	Operational
19 December; 21:49:07	Skynet 5D military communications satellite operated by Astrium Services on behalf of the British Ministry of Defence.					

- ← Jan
- Feb
- Mar
- Apr
- May
- Jun
- Jul
- Aug
- Sep
- Oct
- Nov
- Dec →

== Suborbital flights ==
Date and time (UTC)	Rocket	Flight number	Launch site		LSP	
Date and time (UTC)	Payload (⚀ = CubeSat)	Operator	Orbit	Function	Decay (UTC)	Outcome
Date and time (UTC)	Remarks					
11 January; 13:25	(United States) Terrier-Improved Malemute		(United States) Wallops Island		(United States) NASA	
11 January; 13:25		NASA	Suborbital	Test flight	11 January	Successful
11 January; 20:51	(Japan) S-520		(Japan) Uchinoura		(Japan) JAXA	
11 January; 20:51		JAXA/HU/TU/TU/TPU/KU/KUT	Suborbital	Atmospheric science	11 January	Successful
24 January	(Israel) Arrow III		(Israel) Negev		(Israel) IAI	
24 January		IAI/IDF	Suborbital	ABM Test	24 January	Successful
24 January	First test flight of the Arrow-III					
10 February; 04:40	(India) Prithvi		(India) ITR IC-4		(India) DRDO	
10 February; 04:40		DRDO	Suborbital	Target	10 February	Successful
10 February; 04:40	Target for ABM test, successfully intercepted					
10 February	(Israel) Blue Sparrow		F-15 Eagle, Israel		(Israel) IAF	
10 February		Israeli Air Force	Suborbital	ABM target	10 February	Successful
10 February	Arrow-3 tracking target					
13 February; 09:32	(Brazil) VSB-30		(Sweden) Esrange		(Europe) EuroLaunch	
13 February; 09:32	(Sweden) MASER-12	SSC	Suborbital	Microgravity	13 February	Successful
19 February; 05:41	(Canada) Black Brant IX		(United States) Poker Flat		(United States) NASA	
19 February; 05:41		UNH	Suborbital	Auroral research	19 February	Successful
22 February	(United States) UGM-133 Trident II D5		(United States) USS Tennessee, ETR		(United States) US Navy	
22 February		US Navy	Suborbital	Missile test	22 February	Successful
22 February	Demonstration and Shakedown Operation 23 (DASO-23)					
25 February; 10:46	(United States) LGM-30G Minuteman III		(United States) Vandenberg LF-09		(United States) US Air Force	
25 February; 10:46		US Air Force	Suborbital	Test flight	25 February	Successful
22 March; 09:00	(Canada) Black Brant IX		(United States) White Sands		(United States) NASA	
22 March; 09:00	(United States) CIBER	Caltech	Suborbital	Astronomy	22 March	Successful
27 March; 08:58	(United States) Terrier-Oriole		(United States) Wallops Island		(United States) NASA	
27 March; 08:58	(United States) ATREX	Clemson	Suborbital	Geospace	27 March	Successful
27 March; 08:59	(United States) Terrier-Improved Malemute		(United States) Wallops Island		(United States) NASA	
27 March; 08:59	(United States) ATREX	Clemson	Suborbital	Geospace	27 March	Successful
27 March; 09:00	(United States) Terrier-Orion		(United States) Wallops Island		(United States) NASA	
27 March; 09:00	(United States) ATREX	Clemson	Suborbital	Geospace	27 March	Successful
27 March; 09:02	(United States) Terrier-Improved Malemute		(United States) Wallops Island		(United States) NASA	
27 March; 09:02	(United States) ATREX	Clemson	Suborbital	Geospace	27 March	Successful
27 March; 09:03	(United States) Terrier-Orion		(United States) Wallops Island		(United States) NASA	
27 March; 09:03	(United States) ATREX	Clemson	Suborbital	Geospace	27 March	Successful
5 April; 14:18	(United States) SpaceLoft XL		(United States) Spaceport America		(United States) UP Aerospace	
5 April; 14:18		ORS	Suborbital	Technology demonstration	5 April	Successful
5 April; 14:18	Apogee: 117 kilometres (73 mi), successfully recovered					
14 April	(United States) UGM-133 Trident II D5		(United States) USS Maryland, ETR		(United States) US Navy	
14 April		US Navy	Suborbital	Test flight	14 April	Successful
14 April	Follow-on Commander's Evaluation Test 45					
14 April	(United States) UGM-133 Trident II D5		(United States) USS Maryland, ETR		(United States) US Navy	
14 April		US Navy	Suborbital	Test flight	14 April	Successful
14 April	Follow-on Commander's Evaluation Test 45					
16 April	(United States) UGM-133 Trident II D5		(United States) USS Maryland, ETR		(United States) US Navy	
16 April		US Navy	Suborbital	Test flight	16 April	Successful
16 April	Follow-on Commander's Evaluation Test 46					
16 April	(United States) UGM-133 Trident II D5		(United States) USS Maryland, ETR		(United States) US Navy	
16 April		US Navy	Suborbital	Test flight	16 April	Successful
16 April	Follow-on Commander's Evaluation Test 46					
19 April; 02:37	(India) Agni-V		(India) Integrated Test Range		(India) DRDO	
19 April; 02:37		DRDO	Suborbital	Test flight	19 April	Successful
19 April; 02:37	Apogee: 800 kilometres (500 mi), maiden flight of Agni-V					
23 April	(Brazil) VS-30/Orion		(Norway) Andøya		(Australia) DSTO	
23 April	(Australia) HiFire-5	DSTO	Suborbital	Technology demonstration	23 April	Launch failure
23 April	Hypersonic research experiment, second stage of launch vehicle failed to ignite					
25 April	(Pakistan) Shaheen-IA		(Pakistan) Sonmiani		(Pakistan) ASFC	
25 April		ASFC	Suborbital	Test flight	25 April	Successful
10 May; 06:18	(United States) Terrier Orion (ARAV-A)	FTM-16 E2a	(United States) Kauai		(United States) MDA	
10 May; 06:18		MDA	Suborbital	ABM target	10 May	Successful
10 May; 06:18	SM-3 Block 1B target					
10 May; 06:21	(United States) RIM-161C SM-3 Block 1B	FTM-16 E2a	(United States) USS Lake Erie, Pacific Ocean		(United States) US Navy	
10 May; 06:21		US Navy	Suborbital	ABM test	10 May	Successful
10 May; 06:21	ARAV-A interceptor, successful intercept					
23 May; 06:15	(Russia) RS-26 Rubezh		(Russia) Plesetsk		(Russia) RVSN	
23 May; 06:15		RVSN	Suborbital	Missile test	23 May	Successful
7 June; 17:39	(Russia) RS-12M Topol		(Russia) Kapustin Yar		(Russia) RVSN	
7 June; 17:39		RVSN	Suborbital	Missile test	7 June	Successful
21 June; 10:40	(United States) Terrier Improved Orion		(United States) Wallops Island		(United States) NASA	
21 June; 10:40	(United States) RockOn	Colorado	Suborbital	Student experiments	21 June	Successful
22 June; 19:18	(Brazil) VS-40		(Norway) Andøya		(Norway) Andøya	
22 June; 19:18	(Germany) SHEFEX II	DLR	Suborbital	Technology demonstration	22 June	Successful
23 June; 19:30	(Canada) Black Brant IX		(United States) White Sands		(United States) NASA	
23 June; 19:30	(United States) EVE	CU Boulder	Suborbital	SDO calibration	23 June	Successful
27 June; 09:15	(United States) Castor 4B	FTM-18	(United States) Kauai		(United States) MDA	
27 June; 09:15		MDA	Suborbital	ABM target	27 June	Successful
27 June; 09:15	SM-3 Block 1B target					
27 June; 09:18	(United States) RIM-161C SM-3 Block 1B	FTM-18	(United States) USS Lake Erie, Pacific Ocean		(United States) US Navy	
27 June; 09:18		US Navy	Suborbital	ABM test	27 June	Successful
27 June; 09:18	Castor 4B interceptor, successful intercept					
3 July	(Iran) Shahab-1		Iran		(Iran) IRGC	
3 July		IGRC	Suborbital	Missile test	3 July	Successful
3 July	Apogee: ~100 kilometres (62 mi)					
3 July	(Iran) Shahab-2		Iran		(Iran) IGRC	
3 July		IRGC	Suborbital	Missile test	3 July	Successful
3 July	Apogee: ~100 kilometres (62 mi)					
3 July	(Iran) Shahab-3		Iran		(Iran) IRGC	
3 July		IRGC	Suborbital	Missile test	3 July	Successful
3 July	Apogee: ~150 kilometres (93 mi)					
5 July; 18:50	(Canada) Black Brant IX		(United States) White Sands		(United States) NASA	
5 July; 18:50	(United States) SUMI	NASA/MSFC	Suborbital	Solar research	5 July	Successful
11 July; 18:50	(Canada) Black Brant IX		(United States) White Sands		(United States) NASA	
11 July; 18:50	(United States) Hi-C	NASA/MSFC	Suborbital	Solar research	11 July	Successful
13 July; 04:36	(India) Agni-I		(India) Integrated Test Range		(India) IDRDL	
13 July; 04:36		IDRDL	Suborbital	Missile test	13 July	Successful
13 July; 04:36	Apogee: ~200 kilometres (120 mi)					
23 July; 11:01	(Canada) Black Brant XI		(United States) Wallops Island		(United States) NASA	
23 July; 11:01	(United States) IRVE-3	NASA/Langley	Suborbital	Atmospheric entry test	23 July	Successful
23 July; 11:01	Apogee: ~285 miles (459 km); part of the Hypersonic Inflatable Aerodynamic Decelerator programme					
24 July; 19:17	(Canada) Black Brant IX		(United States) White Sands		(United States) NASA	
24 July; 19:17	(United States) DFS	USC	Suborbital	Solar research	24 July	Successful
7 August; 07:30:00	(Japan) S-310		(Japan) Uchinoura		(Japan) JAXA	
7 August; 07:30:00	(Japan)	UT/JAXA/AGU/TKD/NU/TU/KIT	Suborbital	Technology demonstration	7 August	Successful
9 August; 03:16	(India) Agni-II		(India) ITR IC-4		(India) Indian Army	
9 August; 03:16		Indian Army	Suborbital	Missile test	9 August	Successful
9 August; 03:16	Apogee: 220 kilometres (140 mi)					
12 September	(United States) Terrier-Lynx		(United States) Wallops Island		(United States) DoD	
12 September	(United States) Shark	DoD	Suborbital	Radar target	12 September	Successful
12 September	Apogee: ~300 kilometres (190 mi)					
13 September; 12:30	(United States) Juno		(United States) Fort Wingate LC-96		(United States) US Army	
13 September; 12:30		US Army	Suborbital	Target	13 September	Successful
13 September; 12:30	Target for MIM-104 Patriot PAC-3 MSE test, successfully intercepted					
13 September	(Brazil) VS-30/Orion		(Norway) Andøya		(Australia) DSTO	
13 September	(Australia) HiFire-3	DSTO	Suborbital	Technology demonstration	13 September	Successful
13 September	Hypersonic research experiment, Apogee: 349 kilometres (217 mi)					
19 September; 11:45	(India) Agni-IV		(India) ITR IC-4		(India) Indian Army	
19 September; 11:45		Indian Army	Suborbital	Missile test	19 September	Successful
19 September; 11:45	Apogee: 800 kilometres (500 mi)					
21 September; 13:15	(India) Agni-III		(India) ITR IC-4		(India) Indian Army	
21 September; 13:15		Indian Army	Suborbital	Missile test	21 September	Successful
21 September; 13:15	Apogee: 450 kilometres (280 mi)					
21 September; 11:16	(United States) Terrier Improved Malemute		(United States) Wallops Island		(United States) NASA	
21 September; 11:16	(United States) RockSat-X	NASA	Suborbital	Student experiments	21 September	Successful
21 September; 11:16	Apogee: ~153 kilometres (95 mi)					
22 September; 11:00	(United States) Talos Terrier Oriole		(United States) Wallops Island		(United States) NASA	
22 September; 11:00		NASA	Suborbital	Rocket test	22 September	Successful
22 September; 11:00	Apogee: ~269 kilometres (167 mi)					
4 October; 03:37	(India) Prithvi II		(India) Integrated Test Range Launch Complex 3		(India) DRDO	
4 October; 03:37		DRDO	Suborbital	Missile test	4 October	Successful
4 October; 03:37	Apogee: ~100 kilometres (62 mi)					
5 October; 05:55	(India) Dhanush		(India) Ship, Indian Ocean		(India) DRDO	
5 October; 05:55		DRDO	Suborbital	Target	5 October	Successful
5 October; 05:55	Apogee: ~100 kilometres (62 mi)					
19 October; 09:12	(Russia) Topol M2		(Russia) Plesetsk		(Russia) RVSN	
19 October; 09:12		RVSN	Suborbital	Missile test	19 October	Successful
19 October	(Russia) R-29R Volna		(Russia) K-433 Svyatoy Georgiy Pobedonosets, Sea of Okhotsk		(Russia) VMF	
19 October		VMF	Suborbital	Missile test	19 October	Successful
23 October	(United States) UGM-133 Trident II D5		(United Kingdom) HMS Vigilant		(United Kingdom) Royal Navy	
23 October		Royal Navy	Suborbital	Missile test	23 October	Successful
24 October; 18:29	(Russia) RS-26 Rubezh		(Russia) Kapustin Yar		(Russia) RVSN	
24 October; 18:29		RVSN	Suborbital	Missile test	24 October	Successful
25 October	(United States) Long Range Air Launch Target	FTI-01	C-17 Globemaster III, Pacific Ocean		(United States) MDA	
25 October		MDA/IMDO	Suborbital	ABM target	25 October	Successful
25 October	Target for THAAD, successful intercept					
25 October	(United States) THAAD	FTI-01	(United States) Meck Island		(United States) US Army	
25 October		US Army/MDA	Suborbital	ABM test	25 October	Successful
25 October	Intercepted target missile					
25 October	(United States) Terrier Oriole (ARAV-B)	FTI-01	(United States) Wake Island		(United States) MDA	
25 October		MDA	Suborbital	ABM target	25 October	Successful
25 October	SM-3 Block 1A target					
25 October	(United States) SM-3 Block 1A	FTI-01	(United States) USS Fitzgerald (DDG-62), Pacific Ocean		(United States) US Navy	
25 October		US Navy	Suborbital	ABM test	25 October	Spacecraft failure
25 October	ARAV-B interceptor, intercept failed					
25 October	(United States) SRBM		(United States) Kwajalein		(United States) MDA	
25 October		MDA	Suborbital	ABM target	25 October	Successful
25 October	FTI-01, Patriot PAC-3 target, successfully intercepted					
2 November; 17:55	(Canada) Black Brant IX		(United States) White Sands		(United States) NASA	
2 November; 17:55	(United States) FOXSI	UC Berkeley	Suborbital	Solar research	2 November	Successful
14 November; 11:07	(United States) LGM-30G Minuteman III		(United States) Vandenberg LF-10		(United States) US Air Force	
14 November; 11:07		US Air Force	Suborbital	Test flight	14 November	Successful
21 November; 10:55	(Canada) Black Brant IX		(United States) White Sands		(United States) NASA	
21 November; 10:55	(United States) IMAGER	University of Massachusetts	Suborbital	Astronomy	21 November	Successful
23 November	(India) Prithvi		(India) ITR IC-4		(India) DRDO	
23 November		DRDO	Suborbital	Target	23 November	Successful
23 November	Target for ABM test, successfully intercepted					
25 November; 11:20	(United States) Nike-Orion		(Sweden) Esrange		(Europe) EuroLaunch	
25 November; 11:20	(Germany) MAPHEUS-3	DLR	Suborbital	Technology demonstration	25 November	Successful
25 November; 11:20	Apogee: 140 kilometres (87 mi)					
28 November	(Pakistan) Ghauri		(Pakistan) Tilla		Army of Pakistan	
28 November	(Pakistan) Haft-5	Army of Pakistan	Suborbital	Missile test	28 November	Successful
28 November	Apogee: 100 kilometres (62 mi)					
8 December; 21:00	(Brazil) VS-30/Orion		(Brazil) Alcântara		(Brazil) AEB	
8 December; 21:00	(Brazil) Iguaiba	INPE	Suborbital	Microgravity	8 December	Successful
8 December; 21:00	Apogee: 428 kilometres (266 mi)					
13 December; 05:20	(Canada) Black Brant IX		(United States) White Sands		(United States) NASA	
13 December; 05:20	(United States) DXL	U of M	Suborbital	Astronomy	13 December	Successful
17 December; 07:00	(Japan) S-520		(Japan) Uchinoura		(Japan) JAXA	
17 December; 07:00	(Japan)	Tohoku/JAXA/Tokai	Suborbital	Microgravity	17 December	Successful
17 December; 07:00	Apogee: 312 kilometres (194 mi)					
20 December; 03:51	(India) Prithvi II		(India) ITR IC-3		(India) DRDO	
20 December; 03:51		Strategic Force Command	Suborbital	Missile test	20 December	Successful
20 December; 03:51	Apogee: ~100 kilometres (62 mi)					

== Deep space rendezvous ==
Date (UTC)	Spacecraft	Event	Remarks
1 January	GRAIL-B	Lunar orbit insertion	Joined its twin, GRAIL-A, which entered lunar orbit on 31 December 2011.
2 January	Cassini	80th flyby of Titan	Closest approach: 29,415 kilometres (18,278 mi).
30 January	Cassini	81st flyby of Titan	Closest approach: 31,131 kilometres (19,344 mi).
19 February	Cassini	82nd flyby of Titan	Closest approach: 3,803 kilometres (2,363 mi).
9 March	Cassini	Flyby of Enceladus	Closest approach: 9,000 kilometres (5,600 mi).
27 March	Cassini	17th flyby of Enceladus	Closest approach: 74 kilometres (46 mi).
14 April	Cassini	18th flyby of Enceladus; Flyby of Tethys	Closest approach to Enceladus: 74 kilometres (46 mi). Closest approach to Tethys: 9,000 kilometres (5,600 mi).
2 May	Cassini	20th flyby of Enceladus; Flyby of Dione	Closest approach to Enceladus: 74 kilometres (46 mi). Closest approach to Dione: 8,000 kilometres (5,000 mi).
20 May	Cassini	Flyby of Methone; Flyby of Telesto	Closest approach to Methone: 2,000 kilometres (1,200 mi). Closest approach to Telesto: 11,000 kilometres (6,800 mi).
21 May	Cassini	83rd flyby of Titan	Closest approach: 955 kilometres (593 mi).
6 June	Cassini	84th flyby of Titan	Closest approach: 959 kilometres (596 mi).
24 July	Cassini	85th flyby of Titan	Closest approach: 1,012 kilometres (629 mi).
6 August	Curiosity	Landing on Mars in Gale Crater	Used the Sky Crane soft landing system. Successful landing at 05:14 UTC at coordinates 4.5895°S 137.4417°E.
5 September	Dawn	Leaving Vestiocentric orbit	Headed for Ceres, which it reached on 6 March 2015.
26 September	Cassini	86th flyby of Titan	Closest approach: 956 kilometres (594 mi).
13 November	Cassini	87th flyby of Titan	Closest approach: 973 kilometres (605 mi).
29 November	Cassini	88th flyby of Titan	Closest approach to Titan: 1,014 kilometres (630 mi).
13 December	Chang'e 2	Flyby of 4179 Toutatis	First Chinese asteroid flyby. Closest approach to 4179 Toutatis: less than 1 kilometre (0.62 mi) (770 metres).
17 December	GRAIL	Lunar impact at "Sally K. Ride" site	Both GRAIL satellites concluded their mission by impacting the Moon's surface.
22 December	Cassini	Distant flyby of Titan; Flyby of Rhea	Closest approach to Titan: 715,000 kilometres (444,000 mi). Closest approach to Rhea: 23,000 kilometres (14,000 mi).

== EVAs ==
Start Date/Time	Duration	End Time	Spacecraft	Crew	Remarks
16 February; 14:31	6 hours 15 minutes	20:46	Expedition 29/30 ISS Pirs	(Russia) Oleg Kononenko (Russia) Anton Shkaplerov	Moved Strela 1 crane from ISS Pirs module to Poisk module, installed four materials experiments on the exterior of the ISS, and installed supporting struts on the EVA ladder on Pirs.
20 August; 16:37	5 hours 51 minutes	22:28	Expedition 31/32 ISS Pirs	(Russia) Gennady Padalka (Russia) Yuri Malenchenko	Relocated Strela 2 telescoping boom from Pirs docking compartment to Zarya control module, in preparation for undocking of Pirs, which will pave the way for arrival of the Russian Multipurpose Laboratory Module in 2013. Also installed micrometeoroid debris shields on Zvezda service module, retrieved two experiments from Pirs' exterior, installed two support struts for hatch ladder and deployed two small tracking satellites.
30 August; 12:16	8 hours 17 minutes	20:33	Expedition 31/32 ISS Quest	(United States) Sunita Williams (Japan) Akihiko Hoshide	Connected two power cables between the US and Russian orbital segments; removed and replaced Main Bus Switching Unit (MBSU) 1. The crew had difficulty in removing connecting bolts of the old MBSU, and were unable to tighten up the bolts for the new unit. The new MBSU was tied down for future trouble-shooting, with all other tasks deferred to a future EVA. Third-longest EVA in history.
5 September; 11:06	6 hours 28 minutes	17:34	Expedition 31/32 ISS Quest	(United States) Sunita Williams (Japan) Akihiko Hoshide	Installed the new MBSU unit, working around difficulty with one of the bolts; replaced one of the cameras mounted on the Canadarm2. During this spacewalk, Sunita Williams broke Peggy Whitson's 2007 record for most total time spacewalking by a woman.
1 November; 12:29	6 hours 38 minutes	19:07	Expedition 32/33 ISS Quest	(United States) Sunita Williams (Japan) Akihiko Hoshide	Reconfigured and isolated a leak in the ammonia cooling system of power channel 2B on the P6 truss by bypassing a leaking cooling loop and re-connecting jumpers to an unused loop of the Early External Thermal Control System (EETCS), and by redeploying the trailing Thermal Control Radiator of the system.

== Orbital launch statistics ==
=== By country ===
For the purposes of this section, the yearly tally of orbital launches by country assigns each flight to the country of origin of the rocket, not to the launch services provider or the spaceport. For example, Soyuz launches by Arianespace in Kourou are counted under Russia because Soyuz-2 is a Russian rocket.

Country	Launches	Successes	Failures	Partial failures
China	19	19	0	0
France	7	7	0	0
India	2	2	0	0
Iran	2	1	1	0
Italy	1	1	0	0
Japan	2	2	0	0
North Korea	2	1 (Note: First successful orbital launch)	1	0
Russia	26 (Note: Includes two European Soyuz launches from Kourou, French Guiana by Arianespace)	24	1	1
Ukraine	3 (Note: Includes three Zenit from Sea Launch)	3	0	0
United States	13	12	0	1
World	77	72	3	2

=== By rocket ===
- Ariane 5
- Atlas V
- Delta II
- Delta IV
- Delta IV Heavy
- Falcon 9
- H-IIA
- H-IIB
- Long March 2
- Long March 3
- Long March 4
- PSLV
- Soyuz-U
- Soyuz-FG
- Soyuz-2 (Russia)
- Soyuz ST (Europe)
- Safir
- Unha
- Proton-K
- Proton-M
- Rokot
- Zenit-3SL
- Others

==== By family ====
Family	Country	Launches	Successes	Failures	Partial failures	Remarks
Ariane	France	7	7	0	0	
Atlas	United States	6	6	0	0	
Delta	United States	4	4	0	0	
Falcon	United States	2	1	0	1	8 October rocket failure only affected one of two payloads
H-II	Japan	2	2	0	0	
Long March	China	19	19	0	0	
Pegasus	United States	1	1	0	0	
PSLV	India	2	2	0	0	
R-7	Russia	14	14	0	0	
Safir	Iran	2	1	1	0	
Unha	North Korea	2	1	1	0	First successful launch
Universal Rocket	Russia	12	10	1	1	
Vega	Italy	1	1	0	0	Maiden flight
Zenit	Ukraine	3	3	0	0	

==== By type ====
Rocket	Country	Family	Launches	Successes	Failures	Partial failures	Remarks
Ariane 5	France	Ariane	7	7	0	0	
Atlas V	United States	Atlas	6	6	0	0	
Delta IV	United States	Delta	4	4	0	0	
Falcon 9	United States	Falcon	2	1	0	1	Failure only affected one of two payloads
H-IIA	Japan	H-II	1	1	0	0	
H-IIB	Japan	H-II	1	1	0	0	
Long March 2	China	Long March	6	6	0	0	
Long March 3	China	Long March	9	9	0	0	
Long March 4	China	Long March	4	4	0	0	
Pegasus	United States	Pegasus	1	1	0	0	
PSLV	India	PSLV	2	2	0	0	
Proton	Russia	Universal Rocket	11	9	1	1	
Safir	Iran	Safir	2	1	1	0	
Soyuz	Russia	R-7	10	10	0	0	
Soyuz-2	Russia	R-7	4	4	0	0	
Unha	North Korea	Unha	2	1	1	0	First successful launch
UR-100	Russia	Universal Rocket	1	1	0	0	
Vega	Italy	Vega	1	1	0	0	Maiden flight
Zenit	Ukraine	Zenit	3	3	0	0	

==== By configuration ====
Rocket	Country	Type	Launches	Successes	Failures	Partial failures	Remarks
Ariane 5 ECA	France	Ariane 5	6	6	0	0	
Ariane 5 ES	France	Ariane 5	1	1	0	0	
Atlas V 401	United States	Atlas V	3	3	0	0	
Atlas V 501	United States	Atlas V	1	1	0	0	
Atlas V 531	United States	Atlas V	1	1	0	0	
Atlas V 551	United States	Atlas V	1	1	0	0	
Delta IV Medium+ (4,2)	United States	Delta IV	1	1	0	0	
Delta IV Medium+ (5,2)	United States	Delta IV	1	1	0	0	Maiden flight
Delta IV Medium+ (5,4)	United States	Delta IV	1	1	0	0	
Delta IV Heavy	United States	Delta IV	1	1	0	0	
Falcon 9 v1.0	United States	Falcon 9	2	1	0	1	Failure only affected one of two payloads
H-IIA 202	Japan	H-IIA	1	1	0	0	
H-IIB	Japan	H-IIB	1	1	0	0	
Long March 2C	China	Long March 2	2	2	0	0	
Long March 2D	China	Long March 2	3	3	0	0	
Long March 2F	China	Long March 2	1	1	0	0	
Long March 3A	China	Long March 3	1	1	0	0	
Long March 3B	China	Long March 3	1	1	0	0	Final flight
Long March 3B/E	China	Long March 3	4	4	0	0	
Long March 3C	China	Long March 3	3	3	0	0	Final flight
Long March 4B	China	Long March 4	2	2	0	0	
Long March 4C	China	Long March 4	2	2	0	0	
Pegasus XL	United States	Pegasus	1	1	0	0	
PSLV-CA	India	PSLV	1	1	0	0	
PSLV-XL	India	PSLV	1	1	0	0	
Proton-K / Block DM-2	Russia	Proton	1	1	0	0	Final flight
Proton-M / Briz-M	Russia	Proton	10	8	1	1	
Rokot / Briz-KM	Russia	UR-100	1	1	0	0	
Safir-1B	Iran	Safir	2	1	1	0	
Soyuz-2.1a / Fregat-M	Russia	Soyuz-2	2	2	0	0	
Soyuz ST-A / Fregat	Russia	Soyuz-2	1	1	0	0	
Soyuz ST-B / Fregat-MT	Russia	Soyuz-2	1	1	0	0	
Soyuz-FG	Russia	Soyuz	4	4	0	0	
Soyuz-FG / Fregat	Russia	Soyuz	1	1	0	0	
Soyuz-U	Russia	Soyuz	5	5	0	0	
Unha-3	North Korea	Unha	2	1	1	0	Maiden flight
Vega	Italy	Vega	1	1	0	0	Maiden flight
Zenit-3SL	Ukraine	Zenit	3	3	0	0	

=== By spaceport ===
- Jiuquan
- Taiyuan
- Xichang
- Kourou
- Satish Dhawan
- Ocean Odyssey
- Semnan
- Tanegashima
- Baikonur
- Kwajalein
- Sohae
- Plesetsk
- Cape Canaveral
- Kennedy
- MARS
- Vandenberg

Site	Country	Launches	Successes	Failures	Partial failures	Remarks
Baikonur	Kazakhstan	21	19	1	1	
Cape Canaveral	United States	10	9	0	1	
Kourou	France	10	10	0	0	
Jiuquan	China	5	5	0	0	
Kwajalein	Marshall Islands	1	1	0	0	
Ocean Odyssey	(United Nations) International waters	3	3	0	0	
Plesetsk	Russia	3	3	0	0	
Satish Dhawan	India	2	2	0	0	
Semnan	Iran	2	1	1	0	
Sohae	North Korea	2	1	1	0	
Tanegashima	Japan	2	2	0	0	
Taiyuan	China	5	5	0	0	
Vandenberg	United States	2	2	0	0	
Xichang	China	9	9	0	0	
Total		77	72	3	2	

=== By orbit ===
- Transatmospheric
- Low Earth
- Low Earth (ISS)
- Low Earth (SSO)
- Low Earth (retrograde)
- Medium Earth
- Geosychronous
  (transfer)
- Inclined GSO
- High Earth
- Heliocentric

Orbital regime	Launches	Successes	Failures	Accidentally achieved	Remarks
Transatmospheric	0	0	0	0	
Low Earth	39	37	2	0	12 to ISS, 1 to Tiangong-1
Medium Earth / Molniya	5	5	0	1	
Geosynchronous / GTO	32	31	1	0	
High Earth / Lunar transfer	1	1	0	0	
Heliocentric / Planetary transfer	0	0	0	0	
Total	77	74	3	1	

== See also ==
- 2012 in science
- List of human spaceflights, 2011–2020
- Timeline of spaceflight
