= Timeline of first orbital launches by country =

Orbital launch projects and capabilities Confirmed orbital launch capable country Confirmed orbital launch capable intergovernmental organization (ESA) members Orbital launch project in development or planned Abandoned orbital launch project

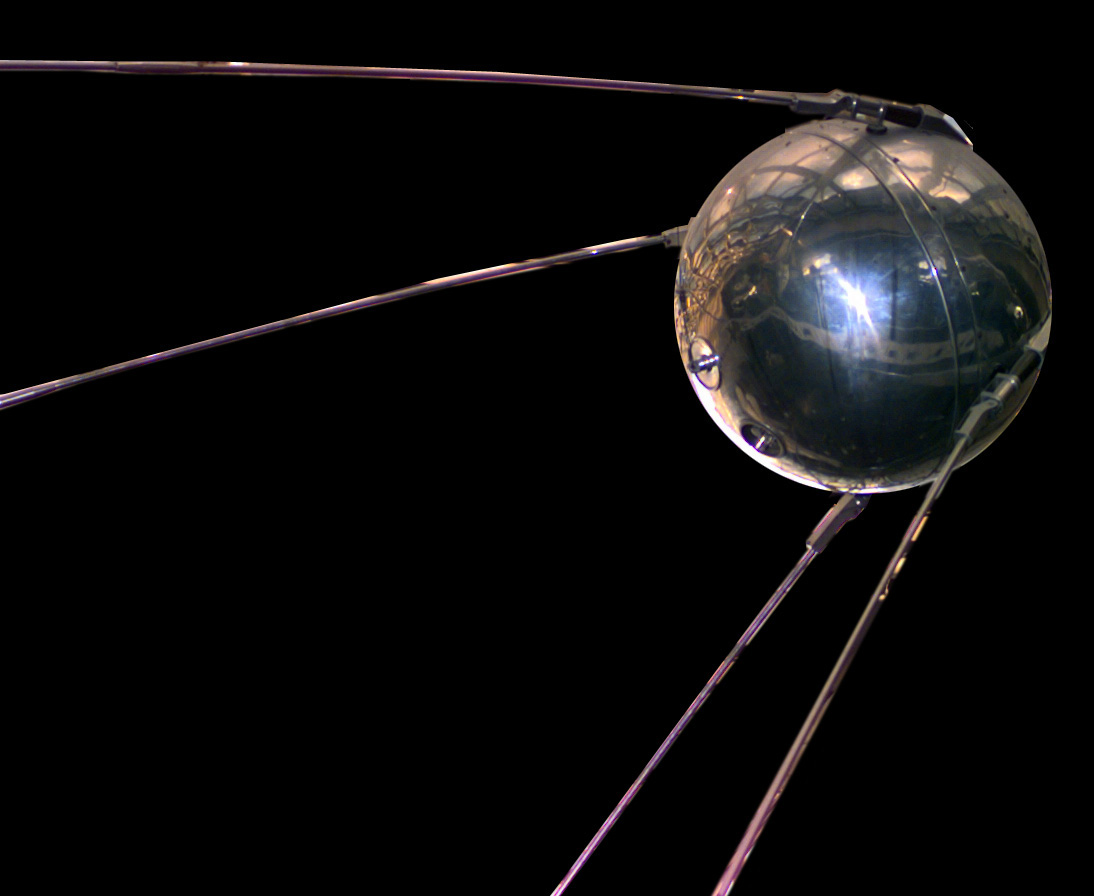
Replica of Sputnik 1, the first artificial satellite, launched by the Soviet Union on 4 October 1957

This is a timeline of first orbital launches by country. While a number of countries, including Canada, Australia, Brazil, Algeria, Kazakhstan, Turkey, Argentina, Italy, Indonesia, Poland, South Africa, the Philippines, Egypt, Spain, Mexico, Thailand and Chile, have built or launched satellites, as of 2026, fourteen countries, including the United States, Japan, China, India, Iran, Israel, France, the United Kingdom, South Korea, and Germany have had the capability to send objects into orbit with their own launch vehicles. Russia and Ukraine inherited the capability of the space launchers and satellites from the Soviet Union, following its dissolution in 1991. Russia launches its rockets from its own and foreign (Kazakh) spaceports.

Ukraine launched only from foreign (Kazakh and Russian) launch facilities until 2015, after which political differences with Russia effectively halted Ukraine's ability to produce orbital rockets. France became a space power independently, launching a payload into orbit from Algeria, before joining space launcher facilities in the multi-national Ariane project. The United Kingdom became a space power independently following a single payload insertion into orbit from Australia.

Fourteen countries and one inter-governmental organization (ESA) presently have a proven orbital launch capability, as of September 2026. (Note: The eleven countries and successor states/union indicated in bold retain orbital launch capability.) The former Soviet Union and the United Kingdom formerly had such an independent capability. In all cases where a country has conducted independent human spaceflights (as of 2021, three — China, the Soviet Union/Russia, and the United States), these launches were preceded by independent uncrewed launch capability.

The race to launch the first satellite was closely contested by the Soviet Union and the United States, and was the beginning of the Space Race. The launching of satellites, while still contributing to national prestige, is a significant economic activity as well, with public and private rocket systems competing for launches, using cost and reliability as selling points.

== List of first orbital launches by country ==
Order	Country	Sector	Satellite	Rocket	Location	Date (UTC)
1	Soviet Union (Note: The Soviet Union's successor state, Russia, took over the Soviet space program after the Soviet Union's dissolution in 1991 with Ukraine inheriting a smaller part of the Soviet space program's space launcher and satellite capability. Soviet heritage launcher designs were utilized for the joint Sea Launch system too. (Note: Sea Launch is currently 85% owned by Russia's Energia. Previously, it was a consortium of four companies from Norway, Russia, Ukraine, and the United States: Aker Kværner; Energia; Yuzhmash and Yuzhnoye Design Bureau; and Boeing, respectively. Its first demonstration satellite, DemoSat, was launched on 27 March 1999 using a Ukrainian-mainly Zenit 3SL rocket from the Ocean Odyssey (a former drilling-rig) in the equatorial Pacific Ocean. Sea Launch has launched numerous satellites since, with few failures.))	Governmental	Sputnik 1	Sputnik-PS	Baikonur, Soviet Union (today Kazakhstan)	4 October 1957
2	**United States**	Governmental	Explorer 1	Juno I	Cape Canaveral, United States	1 February 1958
3	**France** (Note: France launched its first satellite by its own rocket from Algeria, which had been a French territory when the spaceport was built but had achieved independence before the satellite launch. Later France provided a spaceport for ESA space launchers in French Guiana, transferring between 1975 and 1980 (Note: ESA in its current form was founded with the ESA Convention in 1975, when ESRO was merged with ELDO. France signed the ESA Convention on 30 May 1975 and deposited the instruments of ratification on 10 October 1980, when the convention came into force. During this interval the agency functioned in a de facto fashion.) its capability to ESA as a founding member.)	Governmental	Astérix	Diamant A	CIEES/Hammaguir, Algeria	26 November 1965
4	**Japan**	Governmental	Ohsumi	Lambda-4S	Uchinoura, Japan	11 February 1970
5	**China**	Governmental	Dong Fang Hong 1	Long March 1	Jiuquan, China	24 April 1970
6	United Kingdom (Note: The United Kingdom only self-launched a single satellite (in 1971) and that from a commonwealth (Australian) spaceport. Later it joined the European Space Agency.)	Governmental	Prospero	Black Arrow	Woomera, Australia	28 October 1971
—	**European Space Agency** (Note: The European Space Agency developed the Ariane rocket family (the second European launcher program after the failed Europa rocket program under ELDO) operating from its Guiana Space Centre spaceport (first successful launch on 24 December 1979 when Ariane 1 launcher placed the technological capsule CAT-1 on orbit). ESA signatories at the time of first launch were Belgium, Denmark, France, Germany, Italy, Ireland, the Netherlands, Spain, Sweden, Switzerland, and the United Kingdom. Private/public companies and/or governments of these countries (with the exception of Ireland and the United Kingdom) became shareholders in the commercial company Arianespace dealing with production, operation, and marketing. Later Norway became an ESA member and Arianespace shareholder. Additional subsequent ESA member states are Austria, Czechia, Estonia, Finland, Greece, Hungary, Luxembourg, Poland, Portugal, and Romania.)	Governmental	CAT-1 (Obélix)	Ariane 1	Kourou, French Guiana	24 December 1979
7	**India**	Governmental	Rohini 1 (RS1)	SLV	Sriharikota, India	18 July 1980
8	**Israel**	Governmental	Ofeq 1	Shavit	Palmachim, Israel	19 September 1988
—	**Ukraine** (Note: Ukraine provided its own space launcher to Russia and did not use its own space launcher to put satellites in orbit (first Ukrainian satellite is Sich-1, launched on August 31, 1995 by Ukrainian Tsyklon-3 from Plesetsk Cosmodrome in Russia).)	Governmental	Strela-3 (x6, Russian)	Tsyklon-3	Plesetsk, Soviet Union (today Russia)	28 September 1991
—	**Russia**	Governmental	Kosmos 2175	Soyuz-U	Plesetsk, Russia	21 January 1992
9	**Iran** (Note: Although it has signed the Outer Space Treaty, Iran is the only space launch capable nation that has not ratified the treaty.)	Governmental	Omid	Safir-1A	Semnan, Iran	2 February 2009
10	**Italy**	Governmental	LARES, ALMASat-1, Xatcobeo, UniCubeSat-GG, Robusta, e-st@r, Goliat, PW-Sat, MaSat-1	Vega	Kourou, French Guiana	3 February 2012
11	**North Korea**	Governmental	Kwangmyŏngsŏng-3 Unit 2	Unha-3	Sohae, North Korea	12 December 2012 (Note: The North Korean government first claimed a successful launch on 31 August 1998 with Kwangmyŏngsŏng-1 from Musudan-ri, which was internationally determined to be a failure. Another launch on 5 April 2009, with the Kwangmyŏngsŏng-2 satellite, was also reported by North Korea to have reached orbit; however, US and South Korean officials stated that the launch failed to reach orbit.)
12	**South Korea**	Governmental	STSat-2C	Naro-1	Goheung, South Korea	30 January 2013
13	**New Zealand**	Private	Humanity Star	Electron	Mahia LC-1A, New Zealand	21 January 2018
14	**Germany**	Private	CyBEEsat, TriSat-S, Platform 6, FramSat-1, SpaceTeamSat1, Let It Go	Spectrum (rocket)	Andøya Space	5 September 2026

=== Partial contributions to orbital launch systems ===
Italy had contributed in the creation of an orbital launch system prior to its 2012 launch.

Order	Country	Sector	Satellite	Rocket	Location	Date (UTC)
1	Italy	Governmental	San Marco 1	Scout-X4	San Marco platform, Kenya	15 December 1964

== Privately developed launch vehicles ==
- United States – Orbital Sciences Corporation (USA) became the first company to launch a privately developed rocket into orbit, the Pegasus on April 5, 1990. Orbital subsequently developed the Minotaur rocket family. Orbital joined SpaceX as one of only two private entities to supply the International Space Station with its launch of the Cygnus Orb-D1 mission on its Antares rocket on September 28, 2013.
- United States – SpaceX (USA) became the second company to launch a rocket into orbit using a rocket developed with private funds. Its first successful launch was performed on September 28, 2008, by Falcon 1 from the Omelek Island, Marshall Islands and its first launch from a US spaceport was Falcon 9 Flight 1 on June 4, 2010, from Cape Canaveral. Its Dragon spacecraft docked with the International Space Station on October 11, 2012, to deliver supplies. With a launch of Dragon 2 on May 30, 2020, SpaceX became the first company to launch humans to orbit.
- United States/New Zealand – New Zealand-American private company Rocket Lab successfully launched its Electron rocket from Mahia Launch Center in New Zealand on January 21, 2018, carrying three cubesats into low Earth orbit. This was the first time that a rocket entered orbit after launching from a privately owned and operated spaceport.
- China – Chinese private company i-Space successfully launched its Hyperbola-1 rocket from Jiuquan Satellite Launch Center and sent several small payloads, including the CAS-7B amateur radio satellite into Earth orbit on July 25, 2019.
- China – Galactic Energy successfully launched its Ceres-1 solid rocket from Jiuquan Satellite Launch Center into Sun-synchronous orbit on November 7, 2020, becoming the second Chinese private company capable of launching satellites into orbit.
- United States – Virgin Orbit successfully achieved orbit on January 17, 2021, using their LauncherOne vehicle to deploy 10 CubeSats into Low Earth orbit for NASA. But the company filed for bankruptcy after a launch failure in 2023.
- United States – Astra Rocket 3.3 vehicle successfully reached orbit on November 20, 2021, after launching from Pacific Spaceport Complex – Alaska (PSCA) carrying the demonstration payload STP-27AD2 for the United States Space Force.
- United States – Firefly Aerospace launched Firefly Alpha rocket, which successfully reached an orbit lower than the expected one, on October 1, 2022.
- China – Space Pioneer successfully launched its first rocket Tianlong-2 into orbit on April 2, 2023. It was the first Chinese company that achieved the goal with a liquid rocket.
- China – LandSpace became a private company with orbital launch capability by successfully launched Zhuque-2, world's first methane-fueled rocket to reach orbit on July 12, 2023.
- China – Orienspace was the fifth private company in China to reach orbit after the successful maiden launch of Gravity-1 on January 11, 2024.
- United States – Blue Origin developed its New Glenn launch vehicle, whose first launch was completed on January 16, 2025.
- India – Skyroot Aerospace became the first private company in India to successfully reach orbit and deploy satellites on its maiden launch of Vikram-1 from Satish Dhawan Space Centre in Sriharikota, Andhra Pradesh on July 18, 2026.
- Germany – Isar Aerospace became the first commercial company in Europe to successfully launch test flight of Spectrum into orbit on September 5, 2026.

== Other launches and projects ==
The above list includes confirmed satellite launches with rockets produced by the launching country, like Algeria, Argentina, Australia, Brazil, Canada, Chile, China, Egypt, France, Germany, India, Iran, Israel, Italy, Japan, Kazakhstan, South Korea, Malaysia, Mexico, the Philippines, Poland, Russia, South Africa, Spain, Thailand, Turkey, Ukraine, the United Kingdom or the United States. Lists with differing criteria might include the following launches:

=== Failed launches ===
- Brazil had yet to launch a satellite into orbit independently and its space program suffered three satellite launch failures, the latest being the explosion of a VLS-1 rocket on 22 August 2003 at the Alcântara Launch Centre, which resulted in 21 deaths.
- Australia's Gilmour Space Technologies with its Eris launch vehicle attempted lift-off on 30 July, with the mission ending in failure after 14 seconds of flight time.

=== Launches of non-indigenous launch vehicles ===
Some countries have no self-developed rocket systems, but have provided their spaceports for launches of their own and foreign satellites on foreign launchers:

- Algeria with the first successful launch from Hammaguir of the French satellite Astérix on 26 November 1965 by French Diamant A. The last orbital launch from Hammaguir was on 15 February 1967 by French Diamant A and there are no further launches scheduled (the first Algerian satellite is AlSAT-1 launched by Russian Kosmos-3M from Plesetsk, Russia on 28 November 2002).
- Italy with the first successful launch from the San Marco platform of its satellite San Marco 2 on 26 April 1967 by US Scout B (the first Italian satellite is San Marco 1 launched by another Scout from Wallops, USA on 15 December 1964). The last orbital launch from San Marco was on 25 March 1988 by US Scout G-1 and there are no further launches scheduled.
- Australia with the first successful launch from Woomera Test Range of its first satellite WRESAT on 29 November 1967 by US Sparta. The second and final successful orbital launch from Woomera was performed on 28 October 1971 by the UK Black Arrow.
- Kazakhstan with the first launch after its independence from the Baikonur Cosmodrome (Note: Currently its Bayterek expansion to accommodate the Russian Angara rockets is delayed into 2017.) on 21 January 1992 of the Russian Soyuz-U2 and Progress M-11 (the first Kazakh satellite is KazSat-1 launched by Russian Proton-K from Baikonur on 17 June 2006). Currently the spaceport continues to be utilized for launches of various Russian rockets.
- Spain; a single Pegasus-XL was launched from Orbital Sciences' Stargazer aircraft flying from Gran Canaria Airport in April 1997.
- Marshall Islands with a successful launch of a Pegasus-H rocket from Orbital Sciences' Stargazer aircraft flying from Kwajalein Atoll in October 2000. Five ground-based launches were made by SpaceX using Falcon 1 rockets between 2006 and 2009, with the first success on 28 September 2008. Three further Pegasus launches occurred between 2008 and 2012, using the Pegasus-XL configuration. Currently there are no plans announced for a Marshall Islands satellite.

=== Abandoned projects ===
- (Nazi Germany) /Germany was developing larger designs in the Aggregat series as early as 1940. A combination of A9 to A12 components could have produced orbital capability as early as 1947 if work had continued. Further preliminary development of numerous rocket space launchers and re-usable launch systems (Sänger II, etc.) took place after WWII, although these were never realized as national or European projects. Also, in the late 1970s and early 1980s, the private German company OTRAG tried to develop low-cost commercial space launchers. Only the sub-orbital tests of the first prototypes of the rockets were carried out.
- United Kingdom did not proceed with a 1946 proposal to develop German V-2 technology into the "Megaroc" system to be launched in 1949. The UK also developed the Black Arrow rocket system and successfully launched a satellite in 1971, shortly after the program had been cancelled.
- Canada had developed the gun-based space launchers Martlet and GLO as the joint Canadian-American Project HARP in the 1960s. The rockets were never tested. In fact, in different periods, they worked in cooperation with Australia, Brazil, South Korea and the United Kingdom.
- South Africa developed the space launcher RSA-3 in the late 1980s in collaboration with Israel, years after Brazil and Argentina launched their first satellites. The rocket was tested three times without a satellite payload in 1989 and 1990. The program was postponed and later canceled in 1994.
- Iraq built and tested the Al-Abid, a three-stage space launch vehicle without a payload or its upper two stages on 5 December 1989. The rocket's design had a clustered first stage composed of five modified scud rockets strapped together and a single scud rocket as the second stage in addition to a SA-2 liquid-fueled rocket engine as the third stage. The video tape of a partial launch attempt which was retrieved by UN weapons inspectors, later surfaced showing that the rocket prematurely exploded 45 seconds after its launch.
- Argentina previous attempts at developing space launcher based on their Condor missile were scrapped in 1993.
- Brazil The VLS-1 was cancelled after decades of development and high expenditures with poor results and a failed association with Ukraine that slowed the program for years.
- Egypt tried to develop space launcher as part of its various ballistic missile programs in the second half of the 20th century. In different periods, they worked either independently or in cooperation with Algeria, Argentina, Canada, Iraq and North Korea.
- Spain developed the space launcher Capricornio (Capricorn) in the 1990s. The rocket was related to the Condor missile from Argentina and its test, scheduled for 1999/2000, was not conducted. As a result, in different periods, they worked in cooperation with Japan and the United States.
- Switzerland Swiss Space Systems company planned to develop the micro satellite launcher-spaceplane SOAR by 2018 but went bankrupt. Thus, in different periods, they worked in cooperation with Chile, Poland and Ukraine
- United Kingdom Orbex developed its Prime launch vehicle, whose first launch was planned in 2023 from Sutherland spaceport.

=== Under development ===
- Argentina is developing an orbital rocket called Tronador II, whose maiden flight is expected to take place in 2030.
- Spain The private company PLD Space is developing Miura 5 orbital launch vehicles, whose firsts launches were respectively planned for 2027.
- Malaysia The private company of Malaysia Independence-X Aerospace developed an orbital launch vehicle called DNLV, being launched in 2023.

=== Satellite launch ===
- Romania planned to launch military and security satellites. The first phase began in 2022.
- Algeria planned to launch military and security satellites. The first phase began in 2024.
- Chile announced that it would launch some satellites in 2024 or any later year.
- Mexico announced that it would launch some satellites some time in 2024.
- Turkey planned to launch some satellites beginning in 2024.
- Thailand Thai Space Consortium developed a satellite called TSC-Pathfinder, being launched in 2023.

== See also ==
- List of orbital launch systems
- List of missiles by country
- Orbital spaceflight
- Satellite
- Spaceport (including timeline of first orbital launches by spaceport)
- Discovery and exploration of the Solar System (including exploration by country)
- Timeline of first artificial satellites by country
- Timeline of Solar System exploration
- Timeline of space exploration
