= Vega flight VV01 =

Space launch

Vega Flight VV01
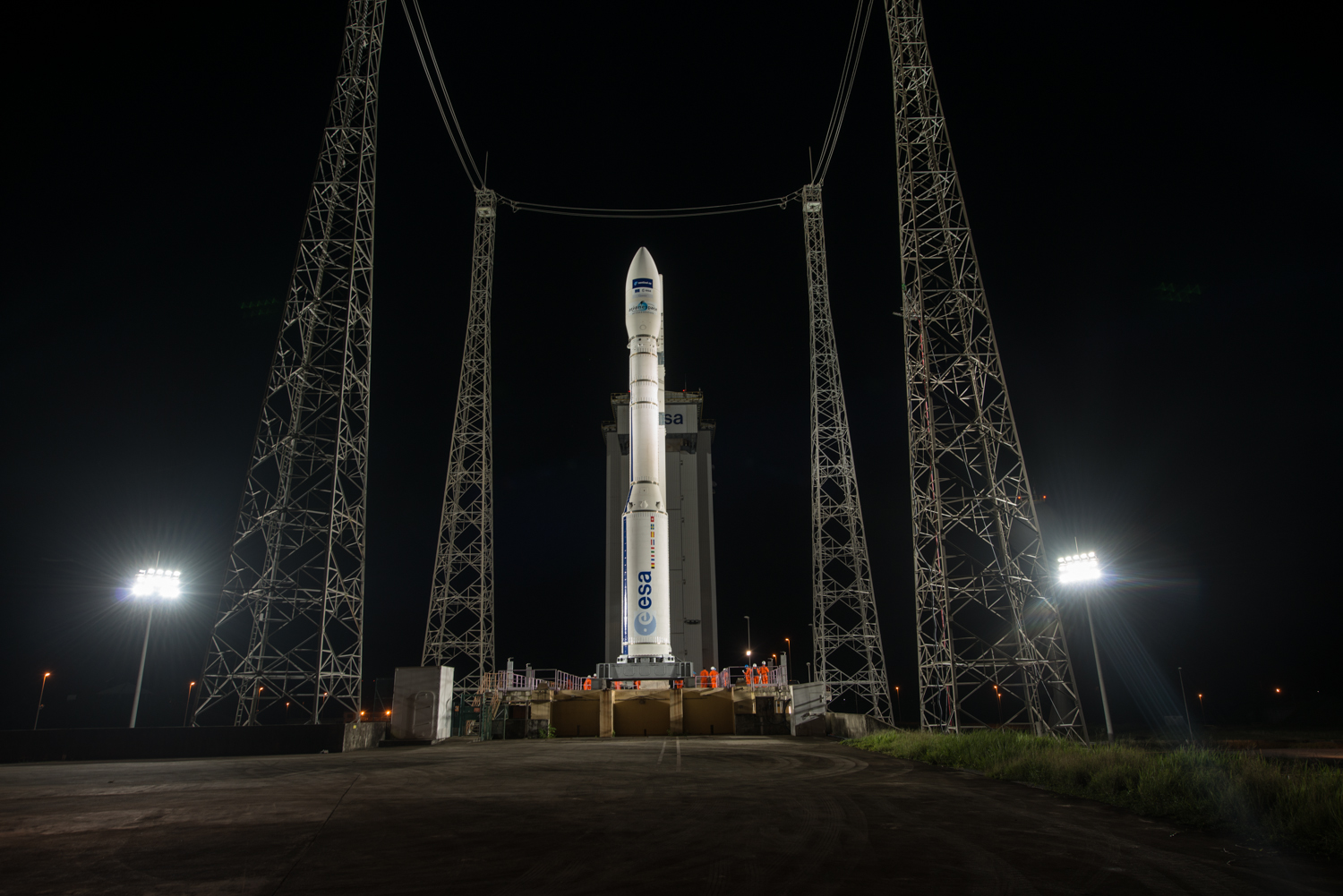
- A Vega launch vehicle, similar to the one used in Vega Flight VV01

Vega launch
- Launch: 13 February 2012, 10:00:00 UTC
- Operator: Arianespace
- Pad: Kourou ELV
- Payload: LARES (primary); ALMASat-1 (secondary); e-st@r; Goliat; MaSat-1; PW-Sat-1; ROBUSTA; UniCubeSat-GG; Xatcobeo
- Outcome: Success

Vega launches

Vega flight VV01 (called officially Vega qualification flight VV01) is the maiden flight of the Vega launcher. It occurred from the Centre Spatial Guyanais (CSG) on 13 February 2012 at 10:00:00 UTC.

== Payload ==
The maiden flight was a multi-payload mission that deployed 9 satellites (2 science satellites and 7 educational CubeSats) into space, with a total payload mass of about 680 kg (1,500 lb) including the satellites themselves (about 400 kg) and the satellite adapters and dispensers. The 3 CubeSat dispensers were capable of deploying up to 3 CubeSats each or 9 in total, however 7 only of the selected 9 were accepted for flight.

=== LARES ===
The LAser RElativity Satellite (LARES) was the primary payload of the maiden flight, and the first to be separated. It had a circular target orbit with an altitude of 1,450 km (900 mi) and an inclination of 69.5°. It consists in a sphere made of tungsten alloy with a mass of approximately 386 kg (851 lb) and a diameter of about 37.6 cm (14.8 in). Due to its unusually high mass density, the satellite had to be held and deployed by a special separation subsystem (SSEP).

=== ALMASat-1 ===
The Alma Mater Satellite-1 (ALMASat-1) was the secondary payload of the flight, with a mass of 13.56 kg (29.9 lb) and a cubic shape with side length of about 30 cm (12 in). As such, both its orbit and adapter were constrained by LARES's. An anomaly during its separation into a targeted elliptical 345 x 1450 km altitude orbit at an inclination of 69.5° was detected a posteriori, and it is suspected that it might be due to the low voltage required by LARES and a thermal imbalance of its separation system (AD-SS). First signals of the spacecraft were received on 14 February 2012, however a few days later, an on-board failure occurred which eventually resulted in a contact loss.

=== e-st@r ===
The Educational SaTellite @ politecnico di toRino (e-st@r) was one of the 7 educational CubeSats onboard Vega's maiden flight, with approximately the same elliptical target orbit as ALMASat-1. The operations have been affected by unexpected tumbling of the CubeSat, which ceased operations in December 2012.

=== Goliat ===
Goliat was another one of the 7 educational CubeSats onboard Vega's maiden flight, and also had approximately the same elliptical target orbit as ALMASat-1. The satellite could not stabilise its attitude and its communications have been intermittent before contact was lost permanently after the last contact on 18 February 2012. It re-entered the atmosphere on 2 January 2015 and disintegrated.

=== MaSat-1 ===
The Magyar Satellite-1 MaSat-1 was another one of the 7 educational CubeSats onboard Vega's maiden flight, and also had approximately the same elliptical target orbit as ALMASat-1. It reentered Earth's atmosphere on 9 January 2015, after almost 3 years of operations.

=== PW-Sat-1 ===
PW-Sat-1 was another one of the 7 educational CubeSats onboard Vega's maiden flight, and also had approximately the same elliptical target orbit as ALMASat-1. It did not deploy its LEONIDAS tail as commanded in April and May 2012 for a planned re-entry in 2013. It turned silent on 23 December 2012 and finally reentered Earth's atmosphere on 28 October 2014.

=== ROBUSTA ===
The Radiation on Bipolar University Satellite Test Application (ROBUSTA) comprised another one of the 7 educational CubeSats onboard Vega's maiden flight that also had a target orbit similar to ALMASat-1's. The satellite emitted a weak signal at the beginning of the mission, but no further communication has been received since. Investigations identified a fabrication defect which prevents the CubeSat's batteries from being charged.

=== UniCubeSat-GG ===
UniCubeSat-GG was another one of the 7 educational CubeSats onboard Vega's maiden flight, and also had approximately the same elliptical target orbit as ALMASat-1. It emitted data for only 1 to 2 weeks after launch.

=== Xatcobeo ===
Xatcobeo was another one of the 7 educational CubeSats onboard Vega's maiden flight, and also had approximately the same elliptical target orbit as ALMASat-1. It also experienced unexpected tumbling.

== Mission description ==
=== Launch date ===
The successful Vega qualification flight took place on 13 February 2012 at 10:00:00 UTC from the ELV launch pad in Kourou, French Guiana. It was the first Arianespace launch of 2012, followed by 7 Ariane 5 and 2 Soyuz flights.

=== Orbit ===
The mission was planned to last 1 hour and 21 minutes, placing the primary payload into its circular orbit at an altitude of about 1,450 km (900 mi) and an inclination of about 69.5° and the secondary payloads into corresponding elliptical orbits with a perigee of about 345 km.
