= Global Educational Network for Satellite Operations =

The Global Educational Network for Satellite Operations (GENSO) was a worldwide network of ground stations and spacecraft which were able to interact via a software standard. The GENSO aimed to increase the return from educational space missions and changed the way that these missions were managed, dramatically increasing the level of access to orbital educational spacecraft.

== History ==
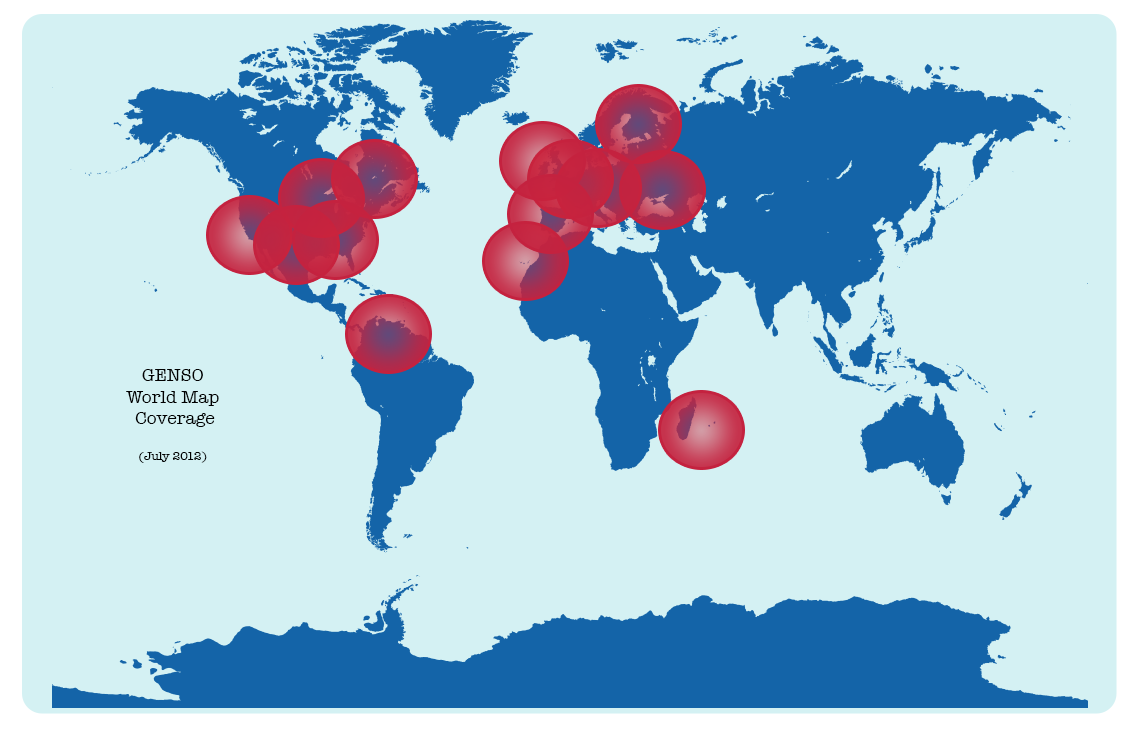
GENSO network map coverage Jan 2013

In November 2007, a kickoff meeting was held at the CubeSat workshop. This short presentation (at Aalborg University in Denmark) to the rest of the GENSO groups described work at Cal Poly for the project. This workshop kicked off the Alpha Test phase of the project. The entire project was successfully demoed in front of a live audience (us). The Mission Control Client booked downlink sessions with the Ground Station Server, and the Ground Station Server controlled the radio and rotors at the AAU ground station (across the building). The running Authentication Server authenticated people and registered satellites on the network.

In February 2009, the ROBUSTA project joined the GENSO initiative. ROBUSTA is the first French university CubeSat. The objective of the payload experiment is to measure the radiation induced degradation of electronic devices. Flight data will be compared to the results of a novel prediction method taking into account the Enhanced Low Dose Rate Sensitivity. The second interesting point of this project is that it's a real educational project. Although the system hasn't yet grown to the "hundreds" of ground stations identified in Alexandru Munteanu's Thesis from 2009, testing and integration continue to proceed.

The GENSO project initiated under the guidance of the International Space Education Board (ISEB) has many existing capabilities and is accumulating the interest of large groups inside and outside of the United States. However, it is still lacking a fully equipped ground station that can complement its capabilities.

Since 2011, a great deal of work has been done on Release 1E of GENSO to help make it more user friendly and reliable for the Amateur Radio community. Ground stations like the one at COSMIAC were running 24/7 downloading data for educational satellites such as the University of Michigan RAX-2 spacecraft.

In 2014 the project was described by NASA as "currently on hold, with little expectation of resuming progress". As of 2025 the project is cancelled.

== How GENSO worked ==
The GENSO system was a software networking standard which allowed a user to communicate with a spacecraft by using a remote ground station which has a clear view of the spacecraft. Communications between the client computer (a mission controlcomputer) and the ground station server were conducted across the Internet. There were three major components to the GENSO system :

- GSS – Ground Station Server
- MCC - The Mission Control Client was the control station for a satellite. Each satellite would have one MCC. A GSS saw a snapshot of the satellite but only MCC will have the entire picture
- AUS – The Authentication Server was the server that mediated communication between MCCs and GSSs on the GENSO network. When a ground station wanted to join the network, the AUS permitted them and then assigned them bookings to accomplish. The most recent AUS was located in Vigo, Spain and the backup was at Cal Poly: San Luis Obispo.

There were also three main components that the GENSO system remotely controlled:

- Rotator Controller
- Terminal node control
- Radio Controller

The GENSO software was written in Java. GENSO was developed and maintained under the auspices of the European Space Agency (ESA).

== List of members ==
ORGANIZATION (country)	COMPONENT (satellite)
Aalto University (Finland)	GSS
California Polytechnic State University (United States)	GSS
Delft University of Technology (Netherlands)	MCC (Delft)
ESOC (Germany)	GSS
ESTEC (Netherlands)	GSS
Swiss Federal Institute of Technology in Lausanne (EPFL), Space Centre (Switzerland)	MCC (SwissCube)
Swiss Federal Institute of Technology in Lausanne (EPFL), Space Centre (Switzerland)	GSS
Graz University of Technology (Austria)	GSS
International Space University (France)	GSS
Isis Space (Netherlands)	GSS
MyGroundStations.com (UK)	GSS
Polytechnic University of Catalonia (Spain)	GSS
Radio Amateur – G3VZV (UK)	GSS
Radio Amateur – G4DPZ (UK)	GSS
Radio Amateur – KA0SWT (United States)	GSS
Sergio Arboleda University (Colombia)	GSS
University of Applied Sciences, Heidelberg (Germany)	GSS
University of Kentucky (United States)	GSS
University of Montpellier (France)	GSS
University of New Mexico, Configurable Space Microsystems Innovations & Applications Centre (United States)	GSS
University of Surrey, Surrey Space Centre (UK)	GSS
University of Texas at Austin (United States)	MCC (FASTRAC 1)
University of Texas at Austin (United States)	MCC (FASTRAC 2)
University of Texas at Austin (United States)	GSS
University of Valladolid (Spain)	GSS
University of Vigo (Spain)	AUS
University of Vigo (Spain)	MCC (Test Satellites)
University of Vigo (Spain)	MCC (Xatcobeo)
University of Vigo (Spain)	GSS
University of York (UK)	GSS
University of La Reunion, LIM, ESIROI IT Dept (Réunion/France)	GSS
Stanford Research Institute International & University of Michigan, College of Engineering	MCC (RAX-2)
University of Michigan (United States)	MCC (M-CUBED)
Sapienza University of Rome	MCC (UniCubeSat-GG)
Warsaw University of Technology & Space Research Centre of Polish Academy of Sciences	MCC (PW-Sat)
Politecnico di Torino (Italy)	MCC (E-st@r)
Hungary	MCC (MaSat-1)
IDeTIC-ULPGC (University of Las Palmas de Gran Canaria) (Spain, Canary Islands)	GSS

== See also ==
- AX.25 Packets
- Antenna Rotator
- Amsat
- CNES
- JAXA
- NASA
- Canadian Space Agency
- SatNOGS
