= E-st@r =

e-st@r
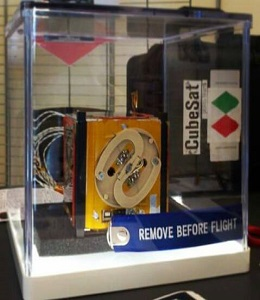
- The Polytechnic University of Turin CubeSat
- Names: est@r e-star
- Mission type: Technology demonstration
- Operator: Politecnico di Torino
- COSPAR ID: 2012-006C
- SATCAT no.: 38079
- Mission duration: Final: 4 years

Spacecraft properties
- Spacecraft type: CubeSat
- Manufacturer: Politecnico di Torino
- Launch mass: 1 kg (2.2 lb)

Start of mission
- Launch date: 13 February 2012, 10:00:00 UTC
- Rocket: Vega (VV01)
- Launch site: Kourou, ELV
- Contractor: Arianespace

End of mission
- Disposal: Re-Entry
- Deactivated: 13 February 2016
- Last contact: 10 February 2016
- Decay date: 14 February 2016

Orbital parameters
- Reference system: Geocentric orbit
- Regime: Low Earth orbit
- Perigee altitude: 302 km (188 mi)
- Apogee altitude: 1,082 km (672 mi)
- Inclination: 69.47°
- Period: 98.47 minutes

e-st@r (Educational Satellite @ Politecnico di Torino) was a miniaturised satellite built by the Politecnico di Torino. It was a 1U CubeSat design with a 10 cm side and a mass not exceeding 1.33 kg.

== Launch and deployment ==
In 2006 the Polytechnic University of Turin had tried to put one of its satellites into orbit (PiCPoT), but the Dnepr launcher used exploded a few seconds after the start and destroyed itself.

In 2009 the European Space Agency in view of the inaugural launch of Vega (which being the first launch had a high probability of failure) offered 9 seats on the carrier for the same number of cubesats, plus another two seats for larger satellites. Only 7 of the cubesats managed to be prepared in time for launch:

- e-st@r of the Polytechnic of Turin,
- Goliat of the Romanian Space Agency,
- MaSat-1 of the Budapest University of Technology and Economics,
- PW-Sat of the Warsaw Polytechnic,
- ROBUSTA of the University of Montpellier II,
- UniCubeSat-GG of the University of Rome La Sapienza,
- Xatcobeo of the University of Vigo.

They were launched into low Earth Orbit on the maiden flight of Arianespace's Vega rocket on 13 February 2012 on a multi-payload mission shared with LARES of the Italian Space Agency and ALMASat-1 of the University of Bologna.

The satellite was successfully deployed into orbit, and the signal was received by the team's ground station and by amateur radio operators. However, operations have been impeded by unexpected tumbling, and the satellite was put into safe mode.

The communication system used a PIC microcontroller and communicated with the ground at a frequency of 437.445 MHz with a power of 0.5 W. The frequencies had been assigned to cubesats by ESA.

A total of about 50,000 euros were spent on the design and construction of the satellite.

The orbit was inclined 71° and slightly elliptical. It also crossed the van Allen belts.

The satellite was created by the CubeSatTeam of the Polytechnic of Turin, responsible for creating picosatellites. The team later developed e-st@r-II to be sent to the orbit again as part of ESA's "Fly Your Satellite" program in 2016.

== See also ==
- Politecnico di Torino
- e-st@r-II
- List of CubeSats
