= UniCubeSat-GG =

- Mission type: Technology
- Operator: GAUSS
- COSPAR ID: 2012-006J
- SATCAT no.: 38085

Spacecraft properties
- Spacecraft type: 1U CubeSat
- Launch mass: 1 kilogram (2.2 lb)

Start of mission
- Launch date: 13 February 2012, 10:00:00 UTC
- Rocket: Vega
- Launch site: Kourou ELV
- Contractor: Arianespace

Orbital parameters
- Reference system: Geocentric
- Regime: Low Earth
- Perigee altitude: 302 kilometres (188 mi)
- Apogee altitude: 1,101 kilometres (684 mi)
- Inclination: 69.48 degrees
- Period: 98.66 minutes
- Epoch: 30 October 2013, 20:43:53 UTC

UniCubeSat-GG is a Miniaturized satellite built by the Sapienza University of Rome. It was launched into Low Earth Orbit on the maiden flight of Arianespace's Vega rocket on 13 February 2012. The launch was a multi-payload mission shared with LARES, ALMASat-1, Goliat, MaSat-1, PW-Sat, ROBUSTA, e-st@r and Xatcobeo.

UniCubeSat-GG is a 1-U cubesat design with a mass of 1 kg. Its primary mission is to study the effects of orbital eccentricity through the Earth's gravity gradient.
