= E-st@r-II =

Italian cubesat

e-st@r-II
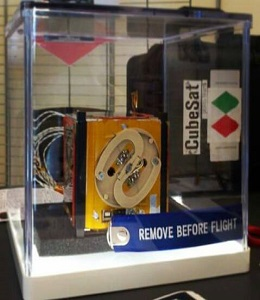
- Mission type: Technology
- Operator: Politecnico di Torino
- COSPAR ID: 2016-025D
- SATCAT no.: 41460

Spacecraft properties
- Spacecraft type: 1U CubeSat
- Launch mass: 1 kilogram (2.2 lb)

Start of mission
- Launch date: 25 April 2016 21:02
- Rocket: Soyuz
- Launch site: Kourou ELV
- Contractor: Arianespace

End of mission
- Decay date: 9 May 2024

Orbital parameters
- Reference system: Geocentric
- Regime: Low Earth (SSO)
- Perigee altitude: 449.4 kilometres (279.2 mi)
- Apogee altitude: 693.7 kilometres (431.0 mi)
- Inclination: 98.2 degrees
- Period: 95.9 minutes

e-st@r-II (Educational Satellite @ Polytechnic University of Turin 2) is a miniaturized satellite designed and built by Polytechnic University of Turin, as part of the "Fly Your Satellite" program of the European Space Agency.

== Launch and deployment ==
It is a CubeSat satellite, placed in orbit by Arianespace with Soyuz Booster, VS14 flight, on April 25, 2016, at 21:02 GMT (23:02 CEST) from Europe's spaceport in Kourou, French Guiana. The main payload of the launch was Sentinel-1B from program Copernicus and Microscope designed by the CNES, the French space agency.

In addition to e-st@r-II there were two other 1U CubeSats (AAUSAT 4 and OUFTI 1) that were manifested aboard the Soyuz launch mission. These small satellites, each measuring just 10 × 10 × 11 cm in height, were developed by teams of university students through ESA programs.

E-st@r-II is a 1U CubeSat developed for demonstrating the autonomous active attitude control capabilities based on magnetic actuation: in fact, the payload is an Active Attitude Determination and Control System. The commissioning phase foresees that the payload is deactivated leaving the satellite in its free tumbling motion, without any attitude stabilization. The A-ADCS starts its work when commanded from GCS, controlling the angular velocities and the attitude of the satellite.

The primary scientific objectives of e-st@r-II mission are:

- to demonstrate the capability of autonomous determination, control and manoeuver, through the development and test in orbit of an A-ADCS entirely designed and manufactured by students
- to test in orbit COTS technology and self-made hardware

E-st@r-II is a follow-on of e-st@r-I, the first Italian CubeSat and the first satellite of Politecnico di Torino to be inserted on orbit. More than 30 students worked on the satellite. It will demonstrated the ability of determining positions with gyros and magnetometers and actively controlling its attitude. The bus functions as a basis for other CubeSats and was a step towards future missions and applications.

Currently the team that developed the satellite, the CubeSatTeam of Politecnico di Torino, is actively working on the development of the Next model: 3-STAR, a 3U CubeSat.

== Communications Issues ==
Once deployed into orbit, e-st@r-II was designed to begin transmitting signals to Earth approximately 30 minutes after activation. Signals could be picked up by anyone with common amateur radio equipment. To celebrate the launch of this second CubeSat, members of the world amateur radio community were invited in a contest to listen for the satellite. While transmissions from the satellite were received by multiple ground stations following deployment, the received signal was not strong enough for either radio amateurs or the satellite's dedicated ground station to demodulate. An analysis of the received signal strength gave figures up to 15 dB lower than what was estimated from pre-launch link budget calculations. Ground tests using prototype hardware and flight spares were able to determine that the antenna likely did deploy correctly and the probable cause of the discrepancy was attributed to improper assembly of the satellite's RF hardware, leading to a large degree of mismatch loss. Ultimately, stations employing high-gain antennas were able to demodulate e-st@r-II's transmitted data packets and the error did not constitute a mission failure.

== See also ==
- Politecnico di Torino
- e-st@r
- List of CubeSats
