= Alén Space =

Spanish Space Company

Alén Space is a Spanish company in the NewSpace sector, located in Vigo (Galicia, Spain). Alén Space designs, constructs, and develops software and hardware for artificial satellites. Since 2008, the company builds nanosatellites below CubeSat requirements.

== History ==
Alén Space was established in 2007 through a joint initiative between the Instituto Nacional de Técnica Aeroespacial (INTA) and those interested in launching a miniature satellite or nano-satellite for use in Internet of Things (IoT) applications, Aircraft Surveillance, and advanced Signals Intelligence (SIGINT), which makes it possible to analyse electromagnetic spectrum and to identify signals originating in the Earth and outer-space. Thanks to this initiative, the Strategic Aerospace Group of the University of Vigo was founded. It is made up of a team from various departments and led by Fernando Aguado. The design and manufacture of Xatcobeo began in 2012, which went on to become the first Spanish nano-satellite.

The Humsat-D satellite] was launched in 2013, and the Serpens, launched in 2015, in collaboration with the United Nations Office for Outer Space Affairs (UNOOSA) and by the European Space Agency (ESA).

In 2017, with the funding of the Ignacia Program of the Galician Innovation Agency (GAIN) of the Xunta de Galicia, the aerospace company Alén Space was founded as a university spin-off.

In 2018, it became of the 100 most-important startups of 2018 according to the South Summit organisation, and won the Cinco Días award for innovation.

In 2019, it received a €1 million investment round from CDTI and BeAble Capital.

In 2020, it was chosen as Best Space Startup at the South Europe Startup Awards (SESA).

In 2020, Sateliot, a satellite telecommunications operator, under a 5G architecture, announced an alliance with Alén Space. The alliance helped develop the payload of its first nano-satellites. The aim was to make the first launch in late 2020. It will incorporate this nano-satellite consisting of an SDR (Software Defined Radio) card, where the received signals are processed and signals to be sent are generated so that they are transmitted to the ground. In addition to a radio frequency conditioning plate and a usable antenna that will allow communication with terrestrial devices.

== Developed satellites ==
- Xatcobeo (2012)
- Humsat-D (2013)
- DustCube (2015–16)
- Serpens (2015)
- Lume-1 (2018)
