= Lume-1 =

Spanish nanosatellite

- Operator: University of Vigo
- COSPAR ID: 2018-111AJ
- SATCAT no.: 43908

Spacecraft properties
- Manufacturer: Alén Space, University of Vigo
- Dry mass: 2.1 kg
- Dimensions: 10 x 10 x 20 cm

Start of mission
- Launch date: 27 December 2018
- Rocket: Soyuz-2.1a (Fregat-M)
- Launch site: Vostochny Cosmodrome
- Contractor: Glavkosmos, ECM Launch Services

End of mission
- Decay date: 14 February 2024

Orbital parameters
- Semi-major axis: 6,865 km
- Periapsis altitude: 479.3 km
- Apoapsis altitude: 510.0 km
- Inclination: 97.2º
- Period: 94.4 minutes

Payload
- TOTEM, HUMPL

The Lume-1 is a Spanish nanosatellite developed for educational and scientific purposes by the University of Vigo in cooperation with Alén Space, the University of Porto and the French National Centre of Scientific Research. The satellite is part of the Fire-RS program in order to battle wildfires.

The satellite reentered the atmosphere on 14 February 2024.

== Mission ==
Lume-1 is the spacial segment of the Fire-RS program. A program developed to create an autonomous network of satellites and UAV to detect and extinguish wildfires. In that network, Lume-1 has the task of receive alerts from sensors on the ground and transmit them to the ground segment at UVIGO GS. These alerts will coordinate UAVs send by ground control to locate and evaluate the fire. In addition, Lume-1 can also store and relay the information gathered by the UAVs to further coordinate the firefighting teams. The whole program's costs have been estimated in nearly 2.1 million €, most of them subsidized by the European Commission under the Interreg Sudoe Program.

Furthermore, professors and students of the Telecommunications Department of the University of Vigo were also involved in the project. Particularly in conceptualization, software development and operation. Consequently, they were largely responsible for the early feasibility studies, communications software, and the different test perform on and by the satellite. The objective of their involvement was mainly educational allowing students to gain some world experience and providing material to write papers and thesis.

== Body ==
The satellite is composed of two CubeSats attached in a 2U configuration forming a 10 x 10 x 20 cm square-based prism. It has a total weight of 2.1 kg. Its lateral faces hold the solar panels necessary to power the satellite while the upper face has four orientable antennas.

=== TOTEM ===
The TOTEM is a software defined radio (SDR) subsystem that was developed by students in the University of Vigo in order to experience and learn how to develop technological products in an industrial environment. It has wide spectrum communications so it can act as a coordinator and relay of the different components of the FireRS (UAV, ground segment, emergency forces and, for some of the experiments, amateur radios).

Its hardware is composed of a motherboard and four omnidirectional antennas. It is a mixture of off-the-shelf and self developed technology (it includes several experimental features such as low-data rate communication, reception of ADS-B signals, characterization of interference sources, ground calibration etc.). It employs UHF with GFSK communication with both S-band M2M receiver and transmitter. And it has downlink rates between at 1200 to 960 bits per second. Some of the frequencies coordinated for downlink listening so far are 437.060 MHz, 437.125 MHz and 437.225 MHz.

Its software was completely developed by the University of Vigo and it is based on embedded Linux. Due to the limitations in time management and critical response of the operating system, the CCSDS Packet Utilization Standard was incorporated into the software. Moreover, some open programs were installed to handle radio communications and wavelength experiments such as GNURadio and SoapySDR drive with the possibility of further changes in-orbit due to the custom IP cores integrated into the FPGA.

=== HUMPL ===
The Humsat System Payload (HUMPL) is a standardization module integrated to the HumSat network, a Humanitarian Satellite Network developed, among others, by the University of Vigo, whose first satellite on the network was the HumSat-D back in 2013. The subsystem was developed to provide an inexpensive framework for humanitarian nanosatellites with great emphasis put in data gathering, ground communication and educative value.

== Launch ==
The satellite was launched on 27 December 2018 at 9:07 (local time) from the Vostochny Cosmodrome in Russia. Lume-1 was carried, along with 27 other satellites (including Kanopus-V 5 and 6 and GRUS-1) in a Soyuz-2.1a rocket equipped with a Fregat-M upper stage. The operation was a joint venture between GK Launch Services, itself part of Glavkosmos and ECM Launch Services under a rideshare arrangement.

It was successfully put in a LEO (479.3 km of periapsis and 510.0 km of apoapsis) with an inclination of 97.2º, a period of 94.4 minutes and a semi-major axis of 6,865 km.

During its operation life it is being monitored by the Telecommunication Engineering School at the University of Vigo.

== See also ==
- List of CubeSats
- Alén Space
- University of Vigo
