= Romanian Space Agency =

Space agency; public institution with extrabudgetary funding

- Agenția Spațială Română
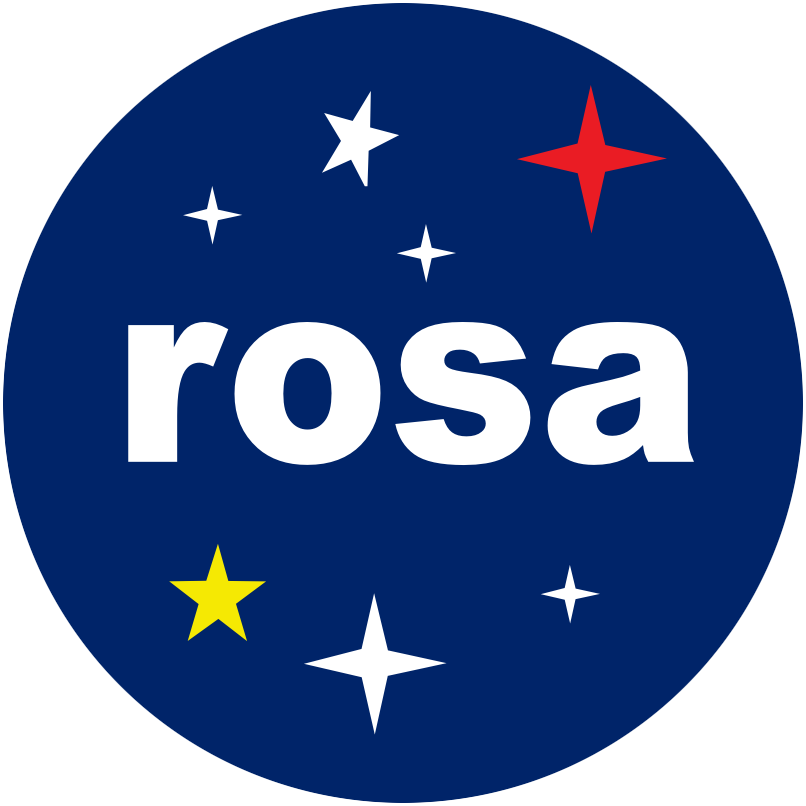

Agency overview
- Abbreviation: ROSA
- Formed: 1991
- Type: Space agency
- Headquarters: Bucharest, Romania
- Administrator: Flaviu Raducanu (Acting)
- Annual budget: US$ 8 million extrabudgetary financing
- Website: rosa.ro

The Romanian Space Agency (ROSA; Romanian: Agenția Spațială Română) is a public institution that coordinates Romania's national space technology. ROSA, established in 1991, is subordinate to the Romanian Ministry of Education.

ROSA is not a representative of the Romanian Government, but ROSA establishes cooperative agreements with international organizations such as the European Space Agency, and the Committee on Space Research (COSPAR). Along with the Ministry of Foreign Affairs, ROSA represents Romania at the United Nations Committee on the Peaceful Use of Outer Space (COPUOS) and at its subcommittees.

In addition, the Romanian Space Agency conducts research projects through the ROSA Research Center.

== History ==
There are several notable historical figures in the aeronautics from Romania, including:

- Traian Vuia, designer and constructor of the first autonomous take-off airplane in 1906.
- Henri Coandă, designer and constructor of the first jet airplane in 1910.
- Elie Carafoli, contributor in aerodynamics and space sciences, former president of the IAF.

Romania is host to heritage companies like Airstar, Avioane Craiova, Industria Aeronautică Română, Romaero and Societatea Pentru Exploatări Tehnice. The country currently manufactures twenty different types of aircraft, based on a mix of domestic and international designs.

The country has experience in the field of space applications, such as satellite communications, remote sensing, geographic information systems (GIS), global information, and positioning and navigation systems. Since 1977 it has operated as an Intelsat ground station in Cheia with two 32-metre antennas. Romania has been involved in more than thirty scientific and technological space missions in the Interkosmos program, including the 1981 flight of Dorin-Dumitru Prunariu on the Soyuz 40.

In 1992, Romania signed a cooperation agreement with the European Space Agency (ESA) for the peaceful uses of outer space, followed by a Framework Agreement with ESA in 2006. Romania contributed through co-investigators to several ESA missions such as Hershel, Planck, SOHO and Gaia.

With Romania's accession to ESA on December 22, 2011, Romanian researchers in the industry now have the opportunity to participate in ESA missions. Since 2004, Marius-Ioan Piso (born January 7, 1954) has served as acting President of the agency and as executive director since 2005. He was involved in the establishment of the Romanian Space Agency in 1991.

The first Romanian satellite, Goliat was launched on the first flight of European Vega launch vehicle on 13 February 2012 from Guiana Space Centre.

=== Activities in the national and international programs ===
==== National programs ====
- Leadership of national program of CD-I AEROSPACE
- Leadership of national program of CD-I SECURITY
- CEEX (11 projects coordinated and 7 as a partner)
- CORINT (3 projects coordinated)
- INFOSOC (2 projects coordinated and 1 as a partner)
- AMTRANS (1 project coordinated and 1 as a partner)
- AGRAL (1 project coordinated)
- RELANSIN (1 project coordinated)
- PNCDI-I (10 projects coordinated and 8 as a partner)
- PNCDI-II (10 projects coordinated and 10 as a partner)

==== International programs ====
- European Space Agency (ESA) (3)
- 6th Framework Program of the European Commission CD-I (5)
- United Nations [2] (UN) Programs (2)
- Food and Agricultural organizational programs (2)
- PHARE Program (1)
- Bilateral and multilateral collaborations (10)
- Participation in consortia, networks, technology platforms

==== National and international affiliations ====
- Space Agencies Forum (1997)
- COSPAR (Committee for Space Research International Council of Science) (1994) — Romanian secretariat
- European Space Agency (ESA) — representative of Romania (1993–present)
- EURISY — member (2000)
- United Nations Regional Network for Space Sciences and Technology (1997)

==== Major international agreements ====
- ESA: European Cooperating State — 2006 and PECS 2007–2011.
- France: Agreement with CNES (2000) — project; Agreement with CNES (2004) — COROT space mission.
- Italy: Agreement of scientific cooperation signed with the National Research Council of Italy (CNR) in 2003.
- NASA: Understanding signed in May 2000. Projects in telemedicine, agriculture, and micro-gravity experiments on the International Space Station.
- NASA: Alpha Magnetic Spectrometer Entertainment for the (AMS) on the ISS.
- Azerbaijan: Co-operation agreement signed in 2003 with the Azerbaijan National Aerospace Agency.
- Bulgaria: Agreement of co-operation in the exploration and peaceful uses of outer space in 1997 signed with the Bulgarian Aerospace Agency.
- Eastern countries (Bulgaria, Czech Republic, Greece, Hungary, Poland, Slovak Republic, Turkey) Contribution to the Regional Network for Research and Education in Space Science and Technology (under the auspices of the United Nations).
- Hungary: Agreement of space cooperation signed in 1998 with the Hungarian Space Office.
- Italy: Agreement of co-operation signed in 1998 with the Italian Space Agency.

==== Romanian experiment on STS-133 ====
The final flight of NASA's space shuttle Discovery — NASA mission STS-133 — transported a Romanian experiment created by the Romanian Institute for Space Science to the International Space Station.

Growth and Survival of Colored Fungi in Space (CFS-A) was an experiment designed to determine the effect of microgravity and cosmic radiation on the growth and survival of colored fungi species.

Principal investigators: Dumitru Hasegan, Romanian Institute for Space Science, Bucharest. (ESA). The launch of STS-133 took place on February 24, 2011.

==== GOLIAT ====
Goliat is the first Romanian artificial microsatellite, launched on February 13, 2012. It was selected to be launched into orbit by the European Vega rocket, on its first operational flight.

The system was developed and designed by ROSA in collaboration with the Institute of Space Sciences, BITNET and ELPROF companies between 2005 and 2007. The microsatellite is a cube with sides of 10 centimetres and a weight of one kilogram.

The Goliat mission was funded by the National Authority for Scientific Exploration within the National Excellence Research program and it has an educational character, being the first microsatellite launched in a ROSA space program.

==== RoBiSAT ====
RoBiSAT represents the second Romanian artificial nanosatellites mission. The mission is composed of 2 Cubesat 2U-type satellites and was supposed to be part of the QB50 constellation. They were to be sent to the ISS in the second quarter of 2017 on the Cygnus CRS OA-7 however the mission was postponed indefinitely.

The two nanosatellites, called RoBiSAT 1 and RoBiSAT 2, were built at the Institute of Space Science located in Magurele, Romania.

=== Expertise ===
==== National expertise ====
National Attributes:

- Acting under the Authority of the Romanian Government — Ministry of Education and Research (1995)
- Reporting to the Sub-commission for Space — RO Parliament (2007)
- Executive president for the Inter-Ministerial Board on Security Research (2004) and Inter-agency INSPIRE Group of experts
- Inter-agency coop.: Ministry of National Defense, Ministry of Foreign Affairs, Ministry of Agriculture and Rural Development, Ministry of Interior Affairs, Romanian Intelligence Service
- Contract authority and PMU for the national RTD Programs on Space, Aeronautics, Security (1995–2008)
- Component of the National Emergencies Council (2000)
- National Certification Authority for GRID information infrastructures (2006)
- Certified security and classification organizational structure authorized to establish research and development Centers oriented on specific objectives of the Romanian RTD Plan

==== International expertise ====
International attributes: ROSA is the appointed national representative for:

- European Space Agency (ESA) — by Laws 40/1993 and 01/2007 (1992–present)
- United Nations — Committee on the Peaceful uses of Outer Space (COPUOS) — by mandate from the Foreign Ministry (1994–present)
- Consultant for the EU Space Council / European Space Policy
- EC — FP6 — AEROSPACE PC (2001–2006)
- EC — FP7 — SPACE PC, SECURITY RESEARCH PC, TRANSPORTS PC (Aeronautics and Galileo)
- EC — GNSS Supervisory Authority (GSA), GMES Advisory Council (GAC) (2007)
- INSPIRE — by mandate from the Ministry of Education and Research (2005–present)
- COSPAR — ICSU — National secretariat (1994–present)
- GEO — Principal representative
- NATO — Scientific Committee “Science for Peace and Security” (2004–present)
- NATO — RTO — Space ST Advisory Group (SSTAG) (2005–present)
- Space agencies: NASA, CNES (French Space Agency), Russia ROSKOSMOS (negotiations), Hungary, Bulgaria, Azerbaijan . . .
- Bilateral agreements International organizations membership and/or national representative: COSPAR, IAF, IAA, EURISY, ACARE, EREA, ASD, EDA, others
- Bilateral agreements with research organizations

===== Joining ESA =====
The first agreement between Romania and the European Space Agency (ESA) was signed in 1992, followed in 1999 by the Romania–ESA Agreement on cooperation in the peaceful exploration and use of space. Since 2007, Romania contributes to the ESA budget as a European Cooperating State (PECS), status ratified by Law no. 1/2007.

On December 22, 2011, Romania became the 19th member of the European Space Agency.

An important step in the accession process was to conduct a technical audit on the relevant entities in Romania (institutes, research centres, industrial companies and SMEs), which have space technological capabilities. The audit was conducted by ESA, based on a sample of 130 entities, 50 of them being organized technical visits and interviews.

The full member state of the European Space Agency status gives the organizations in Romania access, in the same way as the ESA countries, to all programs run. This is an important technology transfer and the opening of a high-tech market. The intellectual property is maintained at a national level, having an important role in the establishment of competence in the country.

=== Research ===
==== ROSA Research Center ====
The ROSA Research Center (RRC) was formed in 1998. Another step was the joint venture agreements concluded with CRUTA — the Romanian Center for Remote Sensing Applications in Agriculture — an SME laboratory initially organized as an independent branch of the ISPIF (Research and Development Institute for Land Use). A joint venture agreement was concluded with the Institute of Space Science in Bucharest.

Since 2006, on behalf of the Romanian Government, ROSA has strengthened its relationship with ESA by signing a PECS agreement.

RRC developed, since 2003, R&D projects addressing national strategy, as well as technological development in the GNSS field. One of the last projects, “Capacity, Infrastructure and Applications for GNSS-GALILEO” directly addressed the problem of extending EGNOS in Eastern Europe through infrastructure development.

==== Results of the research activities ====
Romanian Space Agency has no object of industrialization and marketing. The research results were used for the development of systems and services dedicated to a particular beneficiary (information systems, consulting, education):

- Consulting services in satellite and inertial navigation applications (aerospace and GIS)
- Quality control services for the implementation of LPIS (system control plot) for agricultural subventions (paying agency of the Ministry of Agriculture)
- Information systems consulting for units/research (SMEs)
- Educational Software for remote sensing satellite and specialized disaster monitoring (European Space Agency)
- Pilot control system for Prahova SIPA plot
- Geographic information services through satellite remote sensing (Ministry of Waters, Forests and Environment)
- Satellite communication systems and data communication services (SMEs)
- Consulting regarding industries (European Space Agency)
- Pilot control system for Prahova SIPA plot
- Geographic information services through satellite remote sensing (Ministry of Waters, Forests and Environment)
- Satellite communication systems and data communication services (SMEs)
- Consulting services industries (European Space Agency)
- Experimental model of nanosatellite GOLIAT (prototype)
- Training services, research and military and civil geospatial missions (Military Technical Academy)
- Spatial data infrastructure for environmental applications (WEATHER)
- National Infrastructure in satellite navigation (SMEs)
- Demonstration model for the formation of UAVs
- Demonstration model for the formation of nanosatellites
- Professional software with educational components for numerical simulation of flows in aerodynamics (Universities, SMEs)
- Activities developed on national and international programs

== ESERO Romania ==
Launched during the ‘Romanian Space Week’, an annual scientific conference organized by ROSA between May 12–16, 2014, ESERO Romania was established as the result of a partnership agreement between the Romanian Space Agency and the European Space Agency (ESA), joining a European network of ESEROs which are now present in 10 European countries.

ESERO is a project established by ESA aimed at using the fascination with space to support the teaching and learning of STEM subjects (Science, Technology, Engineering and Mathematics) in European primary and secondary schools. Through ESERO Romania, ROSA and ESA plan to respond to Romanian specific national educational needs and eventually encourage the young generations to take up a STEM-related career.

== Events ==
=== 2022 ===
ESA PROGRAMMES 2023–2025
On September 14, 2022, the Romanian Space Agency (ROSA) with the support of the Ministry of Research, Innovation and Digitalisation, organised an Info Session on the ESA Programmes for the period 2023–2025. The event took place at the University of Agronomic Sciences and Veterinary Medicine (USAMV), in Bucharest.

=== 2014 ===
Annual Scientific Conference Romanian Space Week
Between May 12–16, 2014, the Romanian Space Agency (ROSA) organized the 2014 edition of the annual scientific conference "Romanian Space Week" (RSW 2014). The event was dedicated to presenting the implementation status of the projects funded through the Programme for Research, Development and Innovation for Space Technology and Advanced Research (STAR), which aims to improve Romania's industrial competitiveness in the Programmes of the European Space Agency.

The 2014 ESA–EUSC–JRC Image Information Mining Conference: The Sentinels Era, Bucharest, March 2014
The Romanian Space Agency (ROSA) and the Politehnica University Bucharest (UPB) hosted the Ninth ESA–EUSC–JRC Image Information Mining Conference: The Sentinels Era, between March 5–7, 2014. The event was organized for European space agencies and organizations, aerospace industry and research centres, value-added companies and service providers.

=== 2013 ===
The 29th EUGridPMA Meeting, September 2013
Between September 9–11, 2013, the Romanian Space Agency organized the 29th meeting of the European Grid Policy Management Authority (EUGridPMA). The European Grid Policy Management Authority is an international organization that coordinates European e-Science authentication using digital certificates, and which, together with the Asia-Pacific Grid Policy Management Authority and the Americas Grid Policy Management Authority, form the International Grid Trust Federation.

2nd IAA Conference on Space Systems as Critical Infrastructure, August 2013
Between August 29–30, 2013, the Romanian Space Agency (ROSA) together with the International Academy of Astronautics (IAA) organized the 2nd Conference on Space Systems as Critical Infrastructure at the Golden Tulip Hotel in Mamaia, Black Sea, Romania. The symposium aimed to explore dependency on satellites to support critical infrastructure.

The annual scientific conference of the "Space Technology and Advanced Research (STAR)" Programme, June 2013
Between June 26–27, 2013, the Romanian Space Agency, the coordinating organization of the Research, Development and Innovation Program — "Space Technology and Advanced Research" STAR, held the annual scientific conference dedicated to presenting the implementation stage of projects funded within the projects competition C1-2012.

ESA, ASTRIUM and Thales Alenia Space present the opportunities for participating in the ARTES 14 Programme (Advanced Research in Telecommunications Systems) at Bucharest, April 2013
The Romanian Space Agency organized an informative session on the ESA Programme dedicated to the next generation of Neosat platforms — ARTES 14 (Advanced Research in Telecommunications Systems). Representatives from ESA, as well as from prime contractors Astrium, a subsidiary of EADS (European Aeronautic Defence and Space Company) and Thales Alenia Space attended the event.

The briefing aimed to assess the possibilities, capabilities and interest in being involved in ARTES 14 from organizations in Romania, as well as to provide a better understanding of the general and specific issues related to this program.

The "European Earth Monitoring Programme GMES — Copernicus: Its benefits for the citizens of Eastern Europe" Conference, May 2013
The Romanian Space Agency, the European Space Agency, the European Commission and Eurisy jointly organized the second edition of the GMES COPERNICUS conference dedicated to Eastern Europe EU Member States. The conference took place in Bucharest, May 21–22, 2013.

Since the first edition in 2012, the main objective of the conference was to highlight the various opportunities Copernicus can and will offer, with a focus on the new EU member states from Eastern Europe.

=== 2012 ===
PLEIADES: A new dimension of satellite imaging, October 2012
Organised by the Romanian Space Agency (ROSA) together with Astrium Geo-Services, the Faculty of Land Reclamation and Environment Engineering in Bucharest, the Military Technical University in Bucharest and Tradsym Consult, the event presented the features of the Pleiades-SPOT constellation, as well as applications developed by Romanian researchers, based on the image database provided by SpotImage-Astrium Geo-Services.

Exploratory workshop with the scientific Romanian Diaspora on "Space — Science, Technology and Applications", September 2012
The workshop collaborated with Romanian scientists working abroad to discuss space applications resulting from science and technology. The event was part of the event "Diaspora in the Romanian Scientific Research and Higher Education".

1st IAA Conference on Space Systems as Critical Infrastructures, September 2012
The conference was organized by the International Academy of Astronautics (IAA) and the Romanian Space Agency (ROSA), co-sponsored by the International Institute of Space Law (IISL), September 6–7, 2012.

GEOSS Summer School — Remote Sensing of the Black Sea Marine Environment, August 2012
The 4th edition of the GEOSS summer school was hosted by the Romanian Space Agency in August of 2011, with a focus on the current use of remote sensing, EO data and future remote sensing sensors, contributing to monitoring the marine environment evolution and satellite oceanography.

GMES: New Opportunities for Eastern Europe, May 2012
The Romanian Space Agency (ROSA), together with the European Space Agency (ESA) and the European Commission (EC) organized the "GMES: New Opportunities for Eastern Europe" conference from May 3–4, 2012.

Space Situational Awareness Workshop, April 2012
ROSA together with the Research Agency on Military Technologies organized a workshop on Space Situational Awareness, where programmes of ESA and NATO were discussed, as well as the possibility to develop a Romanian ground-based facility for NEO and space debris observation, space weather contributions in Romania, and high performance computing mobile for disaster management applications.

=== 2011 ===
GEOSS Summer School: Advancing Earth Observation Data Understanding Crisis Management and Emergency Response, August 2011
The Romanian Space Agency organized the 3rd edition of the GEOSS Summer School, part of activities supporting GEO capacity building in Earth Observation. The program focused on acquiring knowledge on the current use of EO data and image information mining techniques contributing to preventing, monitoring and assessing the impact of natural and man-made disasters and crisis situations.

2011 IAA Planetary Defense Conference: From Threat to Action, May 2011
The International Academy of Astronautics held its second conference on asteroid impact prevention from May 9–12, 2011 in Bucharest, Romania. The 1st IAA Planetary Defense Conference: Protecting Earth from Asteroids, co-sponsored by the European Space Agency and The Aerospace Corporation, was the follow-on to three previous planetary defence conferences held in 2004 in Los Angeles, 2007 in Washington, D.C., and in 2009 in Granada, Spain.

== Notes ==
Romania is among the lesser-known of the pioneering nations that contributed to space exploration in the 1970s and 1980s.
