= Goliat =

2012 Romanian cubesat

- Mission type: Science, Experimental
- Operator: Romanian Space Agency
- COSPAR ID: 2012-006D
- SATCAT no.: 38080
- Mission duration: 1045 days

Spacecraft properties
- Manufacturer: Romanian Space Agency
- Launch mass: 1.062 kilograms (2.34 lb)

Start of mission
- Launch date: 13 February 2012, 10:00:00 UTC
- Rocket: Vega
- Launch site: Kourou ELA-1
- Contractor: Arianespace

End of mission
- Decay date: 2 January 2015

Orbital parameters
- Reference system: Geocentric
- Regime: Low Earth
- Perigee altitude: 302 kilometres (188 mi)
- Apogee altitude: 1,075 kilometres (668 mi)
- Inclination: 69.46 degrees
- Period: 98.40 minutes
- Epoch: 31 October 2013, 20:12:28 UTC

Goliat is the first artificial satellite developed in Romania.

== Description ==
The nano satellite was developed and built by the Romanian Space Agency (ROSA). When the project began, the developers of this satellite were still in college.

The satellite is cube-shaped and has a mass of 1 kilogram, and its dimensions are 10 cm on each side. It is built on a Cubesat platform. The satellite carries out three scientific tasks: micrometeorite flux measurements, cosmic radiation flux measurements at LEO and Earth surface imaging via a 3 megapixel camera.

The project was funded and supported by the Romanian Ministry of Education and the European Space Agency.

== Launch ==
Although the initial launch was planned for 2008, the project had been postponed due to some issues with the carrier rocket, Vega.

The satellite was successfully launched on 13 February 2012 from the Guiana Space Centre, together with LARES and other CubeSat satellites from other European countries.

As of 26 February 2012, it appeared that the satellite had not settled into the orbit properly. Due to a malfunction to its stabilizing system, it was expected that the satellite would spin uncontrollably and eventually get lost in space. However, the coordinator of the project, Mugurel Bălan stated that the situation was under control.

The agency managed to make contact with the satellite on 18 February 2012 but only briefly to receive some basic parameters, however it was unable to get its systems running. Contact was lost permanently shortly afterwards. The satellite re-entered the atmosphere on 2 January 2015 and disintegrated.
