= LARES (satellite) =

Italian satellite launched in 2012

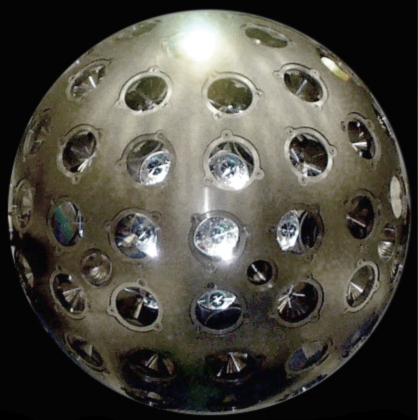
- LARES satellite
- Mission type: Laser ranging satellite Tests of general relativity
- Operator: Italian Space Agency (ASI)
- COSPAR ID: 2012-006A
- SATCAT no.: 38077
- Website: http://www.lares-mission.com/
- Mission duration: LARES 1: 14 years, 8 months and 11 days (elapsed); LARES 2: 4 years, 3 months and 10 days (elapsed)

Spacecraft properties
- Manufacturer: Carlo Gavazzi Space
- Launch mass: 386.8 kg
- Dimensions: 36.4 cm (diameter)

Start of mission
- Launch date: 13 February 2012, 10:00:00 UTC; 14 July 2022, 13:13:43 UTC
- Rocket: Vega VV01; Vega-C VV21
- Launch site: Kourou, ELA-1
- Contractor: Arianespace

Orbital parameters
- Reference system: Geocentric orbit
- Regime: Low Earth orbit
- Perigee altitude: 1437 km
- Apogee altitude: 1451 km
- Inclination: 69.49°
- Period: 114.75 minutes

LARES (Laser Relativity Satellite) is a passive satellite system of the Italian Space Agency.

== Mission ==
=== LARES 1 ===
LARES 1 was launched into orbit on 13 February 2012 at 10:00:00 UTC. It was launched on the first Vega rocket from the ESA Centre Spatial Guyanais in Kourou, French Guiana.

=== Composition ===
The satellite is made of THA-18N, a tungsten alloy, and houses 92 cube-corner retroreflectors, which are used to track the satellite via laser from stations on Earth. LARES's body has a diameter of about 36.4 centimetres (14.3 in) and a mass of about 387 kilograms (853 lb). LARES was inserted in a nearly circular orbit near 1,451 kilometres (902 mi) and an inclination of 69.49 degrees. The satellite is tracked by the International Laser Ranging Service stations.

The LARES satellite is the densest object known orbiting the Earth. The high density helps reduce disturbances from environmental factors such as solar radiation pressure.

=== Scientific goals ===
The main scientific target of the LARES mission is the measurement of the Lense–Thirring effect with an accuracy of about 1%, according to principal investigator Ignazio Ciufolini and the LARES scientific team, but the reliability of that estimate is contested.

In contrast, a recent analysis of 3.5 years of laser-ranging data reported a claimed accuracy of about 4%. Critical remarks appeared later in the literature.

Beyond the project's key mission, the LARES satellite may be used for other tests of general relativity as well as measurements in the fields of geodynamics and satellite geodesy.

== LARES 2 ==
A second satellite, LARES 2, was launched into orbit on 13 July 2022 at 13:13:43 UTC on a Vega-C. It was originally due to launch in mid-2021. The launch was delayed to mid-2022 due to continuing impacts from the COVID-19 pandemic.

LARES 2 may improve the accuracy of the frame-dragging effect measurement to 0.2%. Concerns about the actual possibility of reaching this goal were raised. LARES 2 is made of a nickel alloy instead of a tungsten alloy.

== See also ==
- LAGEOS similar satellites launched in 1976
- List of laser ranging satellites
- List of passive satellites
- PAGEOS
- Project Echo
- Vega flight VV01
