= ALMASat-1 =

- Mission type: Technology
- Operator: University of Bologna
- COSPAR ID: 2012-006B
- SATCAT no.: 38078

Spacecraft properties
- Launch mass: 12.5 kilograms (28 lb)
- Dimensions: 30 centimetres (12 in) cube

Start of mission
- Launch date: 13 February 2012, 10:00:00 UTC
- Rocket: Vega
- Launch site: Kourou ELA-1
- Contractor: Arianespace

End of mission
- Decay date: 25 April 2020

Orbital parameters
- Reference system: Geocentric
- Regime: Low Earth
- Perigee altitude: 311 kilometres (193 mi)
- Apogee altitude: 1,250 kilometres (780 mi)
- Inclination: 69.5 degrees
- Period: 100.32 minutes
- Epoch: 19 December 2013, 04:49:04 UTC

ALMASat-1 (ALma MAter SATellite) was a micro satellite developed by University of Bologna for demonstrative purposes to benefit Earth observation missions. The project was funded by Italian Ministry of Research.

== About the satellite ==
The satellite was made from high-quality aluminium and reinforced with eight stainless steel plates. Solar cells were mounted on four sides of satellite for providing the power required for satellite operation.

== Mission ==
The work on development of ALMASat was started in 2003. It was expected to be launched into orbit on a Dnepr rocket. Later it was launched by Vega launch vehicle with other satellites on board.

The ALMASat-1 was a microsatellite having a cuboidal structure, meant for a demo purpose, it accommodated payloads of different sizes and power requirements. The main purpose of ALMASat-1 was to test the 3-axis pointing accuracy for the future satellite launches.

== Launch ==
ALMASAT-1 was launched by Vega launch system on February 13, 2012, from Kourou, French Guiana.

== Re-entry ==
ALMASAT-1 decayed from orbit 25 April 2020.
