= Xatcobeo =

- Mission type: Technology
- Operator: University of Vigo
- COSPAR ID: 2012-006F
- SATCAT no.: 38082

Spacecraft properties
- Spacecraft type: 1U CubeSat
- Manufacturer: Agrupación Estratéxica Aeroespacial (University of Vigo); Pumpkin Inc.
- Launch mass: 1 kilogram (2.2 lb)

Start of mission
- Launch date: 13 February 2012, 10:00:00 UTC
- Rocket: Vega
- Launch site: Kourou ELA-1
- Contractor: Arianespace

Orbital parameters
- Reference system: Geocentric
- Regime: Low Earth
- Perigee altitude: 299 kilometres (186 mi)
- Apogee altitude: 992 kilometres (616 mi)
- Inclination: 69.47 degrees
- Period: 97.49 minutes
- Epoch: 1 November 2013, 01:51:19 UTC

Xatcobeo, originally known as Dieste, is a project to build the first Galician artificial satellite developed by Agrupación Estratéxica Aeroespacial (currently Alén Space) of the University of Vigo and leadered by Fernando Aguado in collaboration with the Instituto Nacional de Técnica Aeroespacial (INTA) and with the support of the Galician government-owned corporation Retegal. The project was presented to the European Space Agency for its launch in the inaugural flight of the Vega rocket from the Guiana Space Centre, in Kourou (French Guiana). Its life will be between 6 and 12 months, and its cost will be around 1.2 million euros, being 50% funded by the Ministerio de Ciencia e Investigación of Spain, 25% by Retegal and in the last 25% jointly by the University of Vigo and INTA.

It is a Cubesat-type satellite and its objective will be to do research related with communications and with solar power in satellites.

== See also ==
- List of CubeSats
