= List of Proton launches =

As of 12 February 2026, rockets of the UR-500 / Proton family have accumulated 431 launches since 1965, 383 of which were successful, yielding an 88.9% success rate.

For launches in a specific decade, see:

- List of Proton launches (1965–1969)
- List of Proton launches (1970–1979)
- List of Proton launches (1980–1989)
- List of Proton launches (1990–1999)
- List of Proton launches (2000–2009)
- List of Proton launches (2010–2019)
- List of Proton launches (2020–2029)
- Failure
- Partial failure
- Success
- Scheduled

This chart is up to date as of 12 February 2026.
