= LKS =

LKS may refer to:

- Abbreviation of links, units of length used by surveyors; see Link (unit)
- LKS (spacecraft), a not-realised Soviet spaceplane
- Lakeside MRT station, a transit station in Jurong West, Singapore
- Lambda Kappa Sigma, pharmacy fraternity based in the United States
- Lanarkshire, historic county in Scotland, Chapman code
- Landau Kleffner Syndrome, childhood loss of speech faculty
- Li Ka-shing, Hong Kong billionaire
- LKS Goczałkowice-Zdrój, Polish football club
- ŁKS Łódź, Polish sports club
  - ŁKS Łódź (women's basketball)
- ŁKS Łomża, Polish football club
- Kanak Socialist Liberation (Libération Kanak Socialiste), a socialist party in New Caledonia
