= List of Proton launches (1970–1979) =

This is a list of launches made by the Proton rocket between 1970 and 1979. All launches were conducted from the Baikonur Cosmodrome.

== Launches ==
Date/time (UTC)	Configuration	Serial number	Launch pad	Outcome
Date/time (UTC)	Payload	Separation orbit	Operator	Function
Date/time (UTC)	Remarks			
=== 1970 ===
6 February 1970; 04:16	Proton-K/D 8K82K/11S824	247-01	Site 81/23	Failure
6 February 1970; 04:16	Luna E-8-5 #405	Highly elliptical (intended)		Lunar sample return
6 February 1970; 04:16	First stage accidentally shut down T+128 seconds due to false alarm from pressure gauge.			
18 August 1970; 03:45	Proton-K 8K82K	246-01	Site 81/23	Successful
18 August 1970; 03:45	82-EV	Suborbital		Test flight
18 August 1970; 03:45	Investigation into high failure rate of Proton launches			
12 September 1970; 13:35	Proton-K/D 8K82K/11S824	248-01	Site 81/23	Successful
12 September 1970; 13:35	Luna 16 (Luna E-8-5 #406)	Highly elliptical		Lunar sample return
20 October 1970; 19:55	Proton-K/D 8K82K/11S824	250-01	Site 81/23	Successful
20 October 1970; 19:55	Zond 8 (Soyuz 7K-L1 #14)	Highly elliptical		Spacecraft test
10 November 1970; 14:44	Proton-K/D 8K82K/11S824	251-01	Site 81/23	Successful
10 November 1970; 14:44	Luna 17 (Luna E-8 #203)	Highly elliptical		Lunar lander
10 November 1970; 14:44	Deployed Lunokhod 1 rover			
2 December 1970; 17:00	Proton-K/D 8K82K/11S824	252-01	Site 81/23	Successful
2 December 1970; 17:00	Kosmos 382 (Soyuz 7K-L1E #2K)	Medium Earth		Test flight
2 December 1970; 17:00	Test of Block D upper stage			
=== 1971 ===
19 April 1971; 01:40	Proton-K 8K82K	254-01	Site 81/24	Successful
19 April 1971; 01:40	Salyut 1 (DOS-1)	Low Earth		Space station
19 April 1971; 01:40	First space station			
10 May 1971; 16:58	Proton-K/D 8K82K/11S824	253-01	Site 81/23	Failure
10 May 1971; 16:58	Kosmos 419 (Mars-3MS #170)	Heliocentric (intended); Low Earth (achieved)		Mars orbiter
10 May 1971; 16:58	Upper stage failed to ignite as timer was programmed in years instead of hours.			
19 May 1971; 16:22	Proton-K/D 8K82K/11S824	255-01	Site 81/24	Successful
19 May 1971; 16:22	Mars 2 (Mars-4M #171)	Heliocentric		Mars probe
28 May 1971; 15:26	Proton-K/D 8K82K/11S824	249-01	Site 81/23	Successful
28 May 1971; 15:26	Mars 3 (Mars-4M #172)	Heliocentric		Mars probe
2 September 1971; 13:40	Proton-K/D 8K82K/11S824	256-01	Site 81/24	Successful
2 September 1971; 13:40	Luna 18 (Luna E-8-5 #207)	Highly elliptical		Lunar sample return
2 September 1971; 13:40	Payload later failed			
28 September 1971; 10:00	Proton-K/D 8K82K/11S824	257-01	Site 81/24	Successful
28 September 1971; 10:00	Luna 19 (Luna E-8LS #202)	Highly elliptical		Lunar orbiter
=== 1972 ===
14 February 1972; 03:27	Proton-K/D 8K82K/11S824	258-01	Site 81/24	Successful
14 February 1972; 03:27	Luna 20 (Luna E-8-5 #408)	Highly elliptical		Lunar sample return
29 July 1972; 03:20	Proton-K 8K82K	260-01	Site 81/24	Failure
29 July 1972; 03:20	DOS-2	Low Earth (intended)		Space station
29 July 1972; 03:20	Second stage pitch control failure. Automatic shutdown commanded T+180 seconds.			
=== 1973 ===
8 January 1973; 06:55	Proton-K/D 8K82K/11S824	259-01	Site 81/23	Successful
8 January 1973; 06:55	Luna 21 (Luna E-8 #204)	Highly elliptical		Lunar lander
8 January 1973; 06:55	Deployed Lunokhod 2 rover			
3 April 1973; 09:00	Proton-K 8K82K	283-01	Site 81/23	Successful
3 April 1973; 09:00	Salyut 2 (Almaz OPS-1)	Low Earth		Space station
3 April 1973; 09:00	Payload later failed			
11 May 1973; 00:20	Proton-K 8K82K	284-01	Site 81/23	Successful
11 May 1973; 00:20	Kosmos 557 (DOS-3)	Low Earth		Space station
11 May 1973; 00:20	Payload later failed			
21 July 1973; 19:20	Proton-K/D 8K82K/11S824	261-01	Site 81/23	Successful
21 July 1973; 19:20	Mars 4 (Mars-3MS #52S)	Heliocentric		Mars orbiter
21 July 1973; 19:20	Payload later failed			
25 July 1973; 18:55	Proton-K/D 8K82K/11S824	262-01	Site 81/24	Successful
25 July 1973; 18:55	Mars 5 (Mars-3MS #53S)	Heliocentric		Mars orbiter
25 July 1973; 18:55	Payload later failed			
5 August 1973; 17:45	Proton-K/D 8K82K/11S824	281-01	Site 81/23	Successful
5 August 1973; 17:45	Mars 6 (Mars-3MP #50P)	Heliocentric		Mars probe
9 August 1973; 17:00	Proton-K/D 8K82K/11S824	281-02	Site 81/24	Successful
9 August 1973; 17:00	Mars 7 (Mars-3MP #51P)	Heliocentric		Mars probe
=== 1974 ===
26 March 1974; 13:35	Proton-K/DM 8K82K/11S86	282-01	Site 81/23	Successful
26 March 1974; 13:35	Kosmos 637 (Raduga GVM)	Geosynchronous		Test flight
26 March 1974; 13:35	First Proton launch with Block DM upper stage, first Soviet launch to geosynchronous orbit, boilerplate payload			
29 May 1974; 08:56	Proton-K/D 8K82K/11S824	282-02	Site 81/24	Successful
29 May 1974; 08:56	Luna 22 (Luna E-8LS #206)	Highly elliptical		Lunar orbiter
24 June 1974; 22:38	Proton-K 8K82K	283-01	Site 81/23	Successful
24 June 1974; 22:38	Salyut 3 (Almaz OPS-2)	Low Earth		Space station
29 July 1974; 12:00	Proton-K/DM 8K82K/11S86	287-01	Site 81/24	Successful
29 July 1974; 12:00	Molniya-1S	Geosynchronous		Communications
28 October 1974; 14:30	Proton-K/D 8K82K/11S824	285-02	Site 81/24	Successful
28 October 1974; 14:30	Luna 23 (Luna E-8-5M #410)	Highly elliptical		Lunar sample return
28 October 1974; 14:30	Spacecraft later failed			
26 December 1974; 04:15	Proton-K 8K82K	284-01	Site 81/24	Successful
26 December 1974; 04:15	Salyut 4 (DOS-4)	Low Earth		Space station
=== 1975 ===
8 June 1975; 02:38	Proton-K/D 8K82K/11S824	286-01	Site 81/24	Successful
8 June 1975; 02:38	Venera 9 (Venera 4V-1 #660)	Heliocentric		Venus probe
14 June 1975; 03:00	Proton-K/D 8K82K/11S824	285-02	Site 81/24	Successful
14 June 1975; 03:00	Venera 10 (Venera 4V-1 #661)	Heliocentric		Venus probe
8 October 1975; 00:30	Proton-K/DM 8K82K/11S86	286-02	Site 81/23	Successful
8 October 1975; 00:30	Kosmos 775 (Prognoz)	Geosynchronous		Missile defence
8 October 1975; 00:30	Spacecraft later failed			
16 October 1975, 04:04	Proton-K/D 8K82K/11S824	287-02	Site 81/23	Failure
16 October 1975, 04:04	Luna E-8-5M #412	Highly elliptical (intended)		Lunar sample return
16 October 1975, 04:04	Final flight of Proton-K with Block D upper stage, upper stage malfunctioned			
22 December 1975; 13:00	Proton-K/DM 8K82K/11S86	288-01	Site 81/24	Successful
22 December 1975; 13:00	Gran' #11L (Raduga)	Geosynchronous		Communications
=== 1976 ===
22 June 1976; 18:04	Proton-K 8K82K	290-02	Site 81/23	Successful
22 June 1976; 18:04	Salyut 5 (Almaz OPS-3)	Low Earth		Space station
9 August 1976; 15:04	Proton-K/D-1 8K82K/11S824M	288-02	Site 81/23	Successful
9 August 1976; 15:04	Luna 24 (Luna E-8-5M #413)	Highly elliptical		Lunar sample return
9 August 1976; 15:04	First flight of Proton-K with Block D-1 upper stage			
11 September 1976; 18:24	Proton-K/DM 8K82K/11S86	289-01	Site 81/24	Successful
11 September 1976; 18:24	Gran' #12L (Raduga)	Geosynchronous		Communications
26 October 1976; 14:50	Proton-K/DM 8K82K/11S86	290-01	Site 81/24	Successful
26 October 1976; 14:50	Ekran #11L	Geosynchronous		Communications
15 December 1976; 01:30	Proton-K 8K82K	289-02	Site 81/24	Successful
15 December 1976; 01:30	Kosmos 881 (TKS VA #009A/1)	Low Earth		Spacecraft test
15 December 1976; 01:30	Kosmos 882 (TKS VA #009/1)	Low Earth		Spacecraft test
=== 1977 ===
17 July 1977; 09:00	Proton-K 8K82K	293-02	Site 81/24	Successful
17 July 1977; 09:00	Kosmos 929 (TKS #16101)	Low Earth		Spacecraft test
23 July 1977; 21:15	Proton-K/DM 8K82K/11S86	291-01	Site 200/40	Successful
23 July 1977; 21:15	Gran' #13L	Geosynchronous		Communications
23 July 1977; 21:15	First launch from Site 200			
4 August 1977; 22:00	Proton-K 8K82K	293-01	Site 81/24	Failure
4 August 1977; 22:00	TKS VA #009A/P	Low Earth (intended)		Spacecraft test
4 August 1977; 22:00	TKS VA #009/P	Low Earth (intended)		Spacecraft test
4 August 1977; 22:00	First stage thrust vectoring failure. Automatic shutdown commanded T+53 seconds. Upper spacecraft ejected by launch escape system			
20 September 1977; 17:28	Proton-K/DM 8K82K/11S86	291-02	Site 200/40	Successful
20 September 1977; 17:28	Ekran #12L	Geosynchronous		Communications
29 September 1977; 06:50	Proton-K 8K82K	295-01	Site 81/24	Successful
29 September 1977; 06:50	Salyut 6 (DOS-5)	Low Earth		Space station
29 September 1977; 06:50	Last launch of State Trials			
=== 1978 ===
30 March 1978; 00:00	Proton-K 8K82K	292-01	Site 81/24	Successful
30 March 1978; 00:00	Kosmos 997 (TKS VA #009A/P2)	Low Earth		Spacecraft test
30 March 1978; 00:00	Kosmos 998 (TKS VA #009P/2)	Low Earth		Spacecraft test
27 May 1978; 01:25	Proton-K/DM 8K82K/11S86	294-02	Site 200/40	Failure
27 May 1978; 01:25	Ekran #13L	Geosynchronous		Communications
27 May 1978; 01:25	First stage thrust vectoring malfunction starting at T+87 seconds. Automatic cutoff T+119 seconds.			
18 July 1978; 21:59	Proton-K/DM 8K82K/11S86	292-02	Site 200/40	Successful
18 July 1978; 21:59	Gran' #14L (Raduga)	Geosynchronous		Communications
17 August 1978; 20:02	Proton-K/DM 8K82K/11S86	297-02	Site 200/40	Failure
17 August 1978; 20:02	Ekran #15L	Geosynchronous		Communications
17 August 1978; 20:02	Second stage control failure caused by hot gas leak. Automatic shutdown commanded T+252 seconds.			
9 September 1978; 03:25	Proton-K/D-1 8K82K/11S824M	296-01	Site 81/23	Successful
9 September 1978; 03:25	Venera 11 (Venera 4V-1 #360)	Heliocentric		Venus probe
14 September 1978; 02:25	Proton-K/D-1 8K82K/11S824M	296-02	Site 81/24	Successful
14 September 1978; 02:25	Venera 12 (Venera 4V-1 #361)	Heliocentric		Venus probe
17 October 1978; 16:04	Proton-K/DM 8K82K/11S86	298-01	Site 200/40	Failure
17 October 1978; 16:04	Ekran #14L	Geosynchronous		Communications
17 October 1978; 16:04	Second stage engine failure T+236 seconds due to ingestion of debris into the turbopumps			
19 December 1978, 12:15	Proton-K/DM 8K82K/11S86	295-02	Site 200/40	Partial failure
19 December 1978, 12:15	Gorizont #11L	Geosynchronous (planned); Medium Earth (achieved)		Communications
19 December 1978, 12:15	Upper stage malfunctioned, leaving satellite in wrong orbit. Spacecraft was able to correct its orbit, at the expense of onboard fuel.			
=== 1979 ===
21 February 1979; 07:49	Proton-K/DM 8K82K/11S86	294-01	Site 200/40	Successful
21 February 1979; 07:49	Ekran #16L	Geosynchronous		Communications
25 April 1979; 03:44	Proton-K/DM 8K82K/11S86	298-02	Site 200/40	Successful
25 April 1979; 03:44	Gran' #15L (Raduga)	Geosynchronous		Communications
22 May 1979; 23:00	Proton-K 8K82K	200-02	Site 81/24	Successful
22 May 1979; 23:00	Kosmos 1100 (TKS VA #0102A)	Low Earth		Spacecraft test
22 May 1979; 23:00	Kosmos 1101 (TKS VA #0102)	Low Earth		Spacecraft test
22 May 1979; 23:00	Planned to be a crewed launch, converted to an uncrewed test due to failures on previous missions. Rocket reused after an abort after ignition on 20 April, during attempted launch of two other TKS spacecraft.			
5 July 1979; 23:19	Proton-K/DM 8K82K/11S86	299-01	Site 200/40	Successful
5 July 1979; 23:19	Gorizont #12L	Geosynchronous		Communications
3 October 1979; 17:12	Proton-K/DM 8K82K/11S86	302-02	Site 200/40	Successful
3 October 1979; 17:12	Ekran #17L	Geosynchronous		Communications
28 December 1979; 11:51	Proton-K/DM 8K82K/11S86	303-01	Site 200/40	Successful
28 December 1979; 11:51	Gorizont #13L	Geosynchronous		Communications
