= Proton-K =

Russian carrier rocket model used from 1967 to 2012

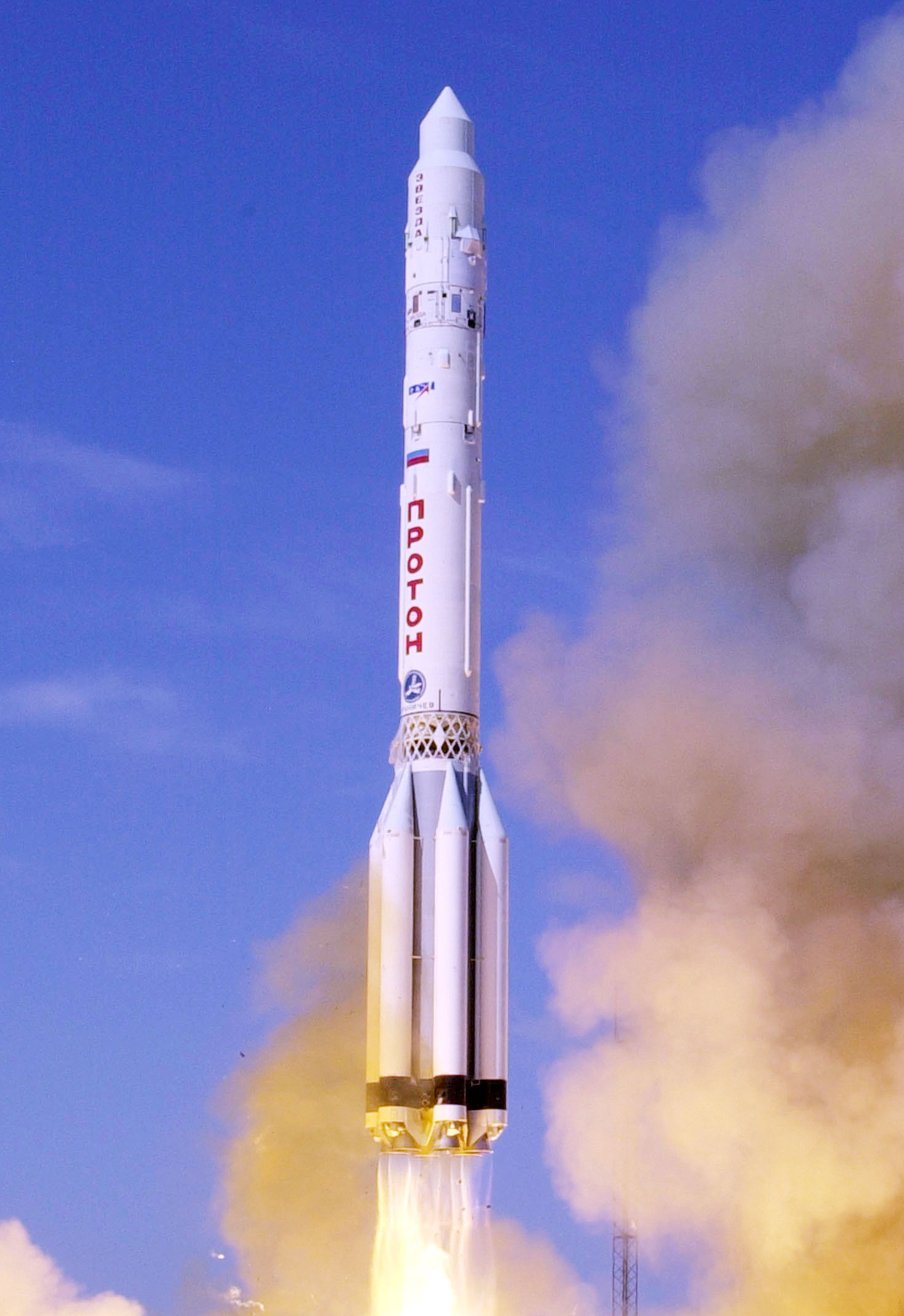
- Launch of a Proton-K carrying the Zvezda module of the International Space Station
- Function: Heavy-lift launch vehicle
- Manufacturer: Khrunichev
- Country of origin: Soviet Union · Russia

Size
- Height: 50 m (160 ft)
- Diameter: 7.4 m (24 ft)
- Stages: 3 or 4

Capacity

Payload to LEO
- Mass: 19,760 kg (43,560 lb); Record: 22,776 kg (50,212 lb) with Zvezda

Associated rockets
- Family: Universal Rocket
- Based on: Proton
- Derivative work: Proton-M

Launch history
- Status: Retired
- Launch sites: Baikonur, Sites 81/23, 81/24, 200/39 & 200/40
- Total launches: 310
- Success(es): 275 (89%)
- Failure: 24
- Partial failure: 11
- First flight: 10 March 1967
- Last flight: 30 March 2012

First stage
- Height: 21.2 m (70 ft)
- Diameter: 7.4 m (24 ft)
- Empty mass: 31,100 kg (68,600 lb)
- Gross mass: 450,510 kg (993,200 lb)
- Powered by: 6 × RD-253-14D48
- Maximum thrust: 10,470 kN (2,350,000 lb_{f})
- Specific impulse: 316 s (3.10 km/s)
- Burn time: 124 seconds
- Propellant: N_{2}O_{4}/UDMH

Second stage – 8S811K
- Height: 14 m (46 ft)
- Diameter: 4.15 m (13.6 ft)
- Empty mass: 11,715 kg (25,827 lb)
- Gross mass: 167,828 kg (369,997 lb)
- Powered by: 4 × RD-0210
- Maximum thrust: 2,399 kN (539,000 lb_{f})
- Specific impulse: 327 s (3.21 km/s)
- Burn time: 206 seconds
- Propellant: N_{2}O_{4}/UDMH

Third stage
- Height: 6.5 m (21 ft)
- Diameter: 4.15 m (13.6 ft)
- Empty mass: 4,185 kg (9,226 lb)
- Gross mass: 50,747 kg (111,878 lb)
- Powered by: 1 × RD-0212
- Maximum thrust: 613.8 kN (138,000 lb_{f})
- Specific impulse: 325 s (3.19 km/s)
- Burn time: 238 seconds
- Propellant: N_{2}O_{4}/UDMH

Proton-K (Протон-К, GRAU: 8K82K, Sheldon: D-1, D-1-e, D-1-h, DoD: SL-12, SL-13), was a Russian, previously Soviet, carrier rocket derived from the earlier Proton. It was built by Khrunichev, and launched from sites 81/23, 81/24, 200/39 and 200/40 at the Baikonur Cosmodrome in Kazakhstan.

The maiden flight in 1967 carried a Soyuz 7K-L1 as part of the Zond program. During the Moon Race these Proton/Zond flights consisted of several uncrewed test flights of Soyuz spacecraft to circumlunar orbits with the unrealized aim of landing Soviet cosmonauts on the Moon.

During the 1970s and 1980s, Proton-K launched every interplanetary probe of the Soviet space program's Venera and Mars missions, using its Blok D fourth stage. In three-stage configuration, it launched the Zond program's circumlunar flights and all seven space stations of the Salyut program. The Soviet program also considered the Proton for launching the TKS crewed spacecraft and LKS spaceplane.

From 1986, the rocket launched six of the seven modules of Mir, the first modular space station, and from 1998, launched the Zarya and Zvezda modules of the International Space Station's Russian Orbital Segment. It was retired from service in favour of the modernised Proton-M, making its 310th and final launch on 30 March 2012.

== Vehicle description ==
The baseline Proton-K was a three-stage rocket. Thirty were launched in this configuration, with payloads including all of the Soviet Union's Salyut space stations, all Mir modules with the exception of the Docking Module, which was launched on the United States Space Shuttle, and the Zarya and Zvezda modules of the International Space Station. It was intended to launch Chelomey's crewed TKS spacecraft, and succeeded in launching four uncrewed tests flights prior to the program's cancellation. It was also intended for Chelomey's 20-ton LKS spaceplane that was never realised.

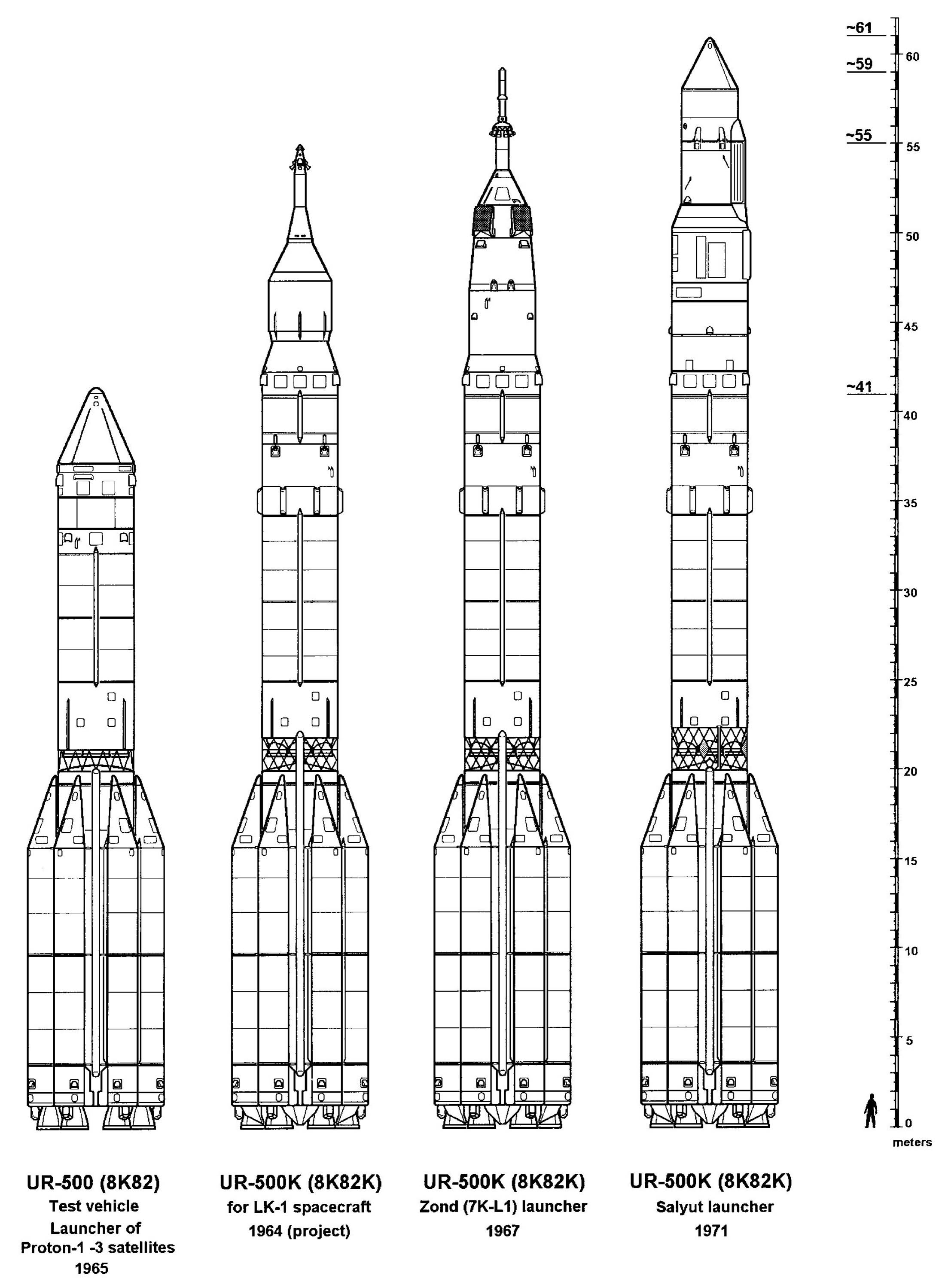
The early Proton-K launch configurations from 1965 to 1971

Like other members of the Universal Rocket family, the Proton-K was fuelled by unsymmetrical dimethylhydrazine and nitrogen tetroxide. These hypergolic propellants ignite on contact, avoiding the need for an ignition system, and can be stored at ambient temperatures. This avoids the need for low-temperature–tolerant components, and allowed the rocket to sit on the pad fully fuelled for long periods of time. In contrast, cryogenic fuels would have required periodic topping-up of propellants as they boil off. The propellants used on the Proton, were, however, corrosive and toxic and required special handling. The Russian Government paid for the cleanup of residual propellant in spent stages that impact downrange.

Proton components were built in factories near Moscow, then transported by rail to the final assembly point near the pad. The first stage of the Proton-K consisted of a central oxidiser tank, and six outrigger fuel tanks. This separated as one piece from the second stage, which was attached by means of a lattice structure interstage. The second stage ignited prior to first stage separation, and the top of the first stage was insulated to ensure that it retained its structural integrity until separation.

The first stage used six RD-253 engines, designed by Valentin Glushko. The RD-253 is a single-chamber engine and uses a staged combustion cycle. The first-stage guidance system was open-loop, which required significant amounts of propellant to be held in reserve.

The third stage was powered by an RD-0210 engine and four vernier nozzles, with common systems. The verniers provided steering, eliminating the need for gimballing of the main engine. They also aided stage separation, and acted as ullage motors. Ducts built into the structure channelled vernier exhaust before stage separation. The third stage guidance system was also used to control the first and second stages earlier in flight.

Many launches used an upper stage to boost the payload into a higher orbit. Blok D upper stages were used on forty flights, the majority of which were for the Luna and Zond programmes. Ten flights used the Blok D-1, mostly to launch spacecraft towards Venus. Blok D-2 upper stages were used three times, with the Fobos 1, Fobos 2 and Mars 96 spacecraft. The Blok DM upper stage was used on 66 launches. The most commonly used upper stage was the Blok DM-2, which was used on 109 flights, mostly with GLONASS and Raduga satellites. Fifteen launches used the modernised Block DM-2M stage, mostly carrying Ekspress satellites, however other satellites, including Eutelsat's SESAT 1, also used this configuration. Two Araks satellites were launched using Block DM-5 upper stages. The Block DM1, a commercial version of the DM-2, was used to launch Inmarsat-3 F2. The Block DM2 upper stage was used to launch three groups of seven Iridium satellites, including Iridium 33. This configuration was also used to launch INTEGRAL for the European Space Agency. Block DM3 stages were used on twenty five launches, almost exclusively carrying commercial satellites. Telstar 5 was launched with a Block DM4. The Briz-M upper stage was used for four launches; three carrying payloads for the Russian Government, and one commercial launch with GE-9 for GE Americom. One launch was reported to have used a Block DM-3 upper stage, however this may have been a reporting error, and it is unclear whether this launch actually used a DM-3, DM3, or DM-2.

== List of launches ==
Due to its rushed development, the Proton K launch vehicle had a low success rate initially. However, the issues were rectified and it went on to become one of the most widely used heavy launch vehicle.

== Launch failures ==
Flight number	Date (UMC)	Vehicle model	Payload	Payload mass, kg	Orbit (intended)	Orbit (actual)	Notes
7	September 27, 1967	Proton K/D	Zond	5375	Moon	?	One first-stage engine did not start at liftoff due to a rubber plug accidentally left inside during assembly, causing control to gradually fail during ascent. The cutoff command was issued at T+97 seconds and the booster crashed downrange, but the Launch Escape System (LES) pulled the Zond descent module to safety.
8	November 22, 1967	Proton K/D	Zond	5375	Moon	no	One second-stage engine failed to ignite at staging. The remaining three engines were shut down automatically and the booster crashed downrange. Once again, the LES pulled the capsule away to safety. Cause was determined to be premature release of fuel into the second stage, resulting in overheating and engine failure.
10	April 22, 1968	Proton K/D	Zond	5375	Moon	?	A malfunction in the LES accidentally shut down the second stage at T+260 seconds and triggered an abort. The capsule was successfully recovered.
14	January 20, 1969	Proton K/D	Zond	5375	Moon	no	Second stage turbopump failure at T+313 seconds. The LES once again lifted the Zond capsule to safety.
15	February 19, 1969	Proton K/D	Luna probe	2718	Moon	no	Payload fairing collapsed at T+51 seconds. Flying debris ruptured the first stage and caused leaking propellant to ignite on contact with the engine exhaust, resulting in the explosion of the launch vehicle.
16	March 27, 1969	Proton K/D	Mars probe	4650	Heliocentric	?	Third stage turbopump failure at T+438 seconds. The upper stages and payload crashed in the Altai mountains.
17	April 2, 1969	Proton K/D	Mars probe	4650	Heliocentric	?	A fire in one of the first stage engines caused an almost immediate control loss at liftoff. The booster reached an altitude of 300m and began flying horizontally before the cutoff command was issued, causing it to plunge nose-first into the ground. Launch complex personnel were unable to leave the Baikonour Cosmodrome due to one exit being blocked by the still-intact second stage and the other by a large puddle of nitrogen tetroxide. They had no choice but to remain there until a rain came and washed the spilled fuel away.
18	June 14, 1969	Proton K/D	Luna probe	2718	Moon	?	Blok D stage failed to ignite and the probe reentered the atmosphere
18	September 23, 1969	Proton K/D	Luna probe	?	Moon	?	Blok D LOX valve failure. The probe remained in LEO until reentering.
18	October 22, 1969	Proton K/D	Luna probe	?	Moon	?	Blok D control malfunction. Probe failed to leave LEO.
23	November 28, 1969	Proton K/D	Soyuz	?	?	?	Pressure sensor malfunction caused first stage cutoff at T+128 seconds
24	February 6, 1970	Proton K/D	Luna	5600	Moon	no	At T+128.3 s, flight safety system automatically shut off first-stage engine because of false alarm from pressure gauge.
30	May 10, 1971	Proton K/D	Kosmos 419	4650	Heliocentric	LEO	Block D flight sequencer programmed incorrectly, resulting in failure to perform second burn or payload separation. Reportedly the coast time between burns was set to 1.5 years instead of 1.5 hours.
36	July 29, 1972	Proton K	DOS-2	18000	LEO	no	At T+181.9 d second-stage stabilization system failed because of short circuit in pitch and yaw channels of the automated stabilization system.
53	October 16, 1975	Proton K/D	Luna	?	Moon	LEO	Failure of fourth-stage oxidizer booster pump.
62	August 4, 1977	Proton K	Almaz	?	LEO	no	At T+41.1 s, a first-stage engine steering unit failed, causing loss of stability and automatic thrust termination at T+53.7 s.
66	May 27, 1978	Proton K/DM	Ekran	1970	GEO	no	Vehicle stability loss at T+87 s because of an error in first-stage No. 2 engine steering unit. Fault attributed to fuel leak in second-stage engine compartment, which caused control cables to overheat.
68	August 17, 1978	Proton K/DM	Ekran	1970	GEO	no	Loss of stability at T+259.1 s caused flight termination. Hot gas leak from second-stage engine because of faulty seal on pressure gauge led to failure of electrical unit for automatic stabilization.
71	October 17, 1978	Proton K/DM	Ekran	1970	GEO	no	At T+235.62 s, second-stage engine shut off with resultant loss of stability caused by a turbine part igniting in turbopump gas tract followed by gas inlet destruction and hot air ejection into second rear section.
72	December 19, 1978	Proton K/DM	Gorizont 1	1970	GEO	GEO, inclination 11.0	Block DM was misaligned for GEO injection burn, resulting in non-circular orbit with 11 deg. inclination
95	July 22, 1982	Proton K/DM	Ekran	1970	GEO	no	First-stage engine No. 5 suffered failure of hydraulic gimbal actuator because of dynamic excitation at T+45 seconds. Automatic flight shutdown commanded. This would be the last first-stage malfunction of a Proton until 2013.
100	December 24, 1982	Proton K/DM	Raduga	1965	GEO	no	Second-stage failure T+230 seconds due to high-frequency vibration.
144	November 29, 1986	Proton K	Raduga	1965		no	Second stage control failure due to an electrical relay becoming separated from vibration
145	January 30, 1987	Proton K/DM-2	Kosmos-1817	1965		incorrect LEO	Fourth stage failed to start because of control system component failure.
148	April 24, 1987	Proton K/DM-2	Kosmos 1838-1840 (Glonass)	3x1260	MEO	LEO	Fourth stage shut down early and failed to restart. Failure occurred in control system because of manufacturing defect in instrument.
158	January 18, 1988	Proton K/DM-2	Gorizont	2500	GEO	no	Third-stage engine failure caused by destruction of fuel line leading to mixer.
159	February 17, 1988	Proton K/DM-2	Kosmos 1917-1919 (Glonass)	3x1260	MEO, inclination 64.8	no	Fourth-stage engine failure because of high combustion chamber temperatures caused by foreign particles from propellant tank.
187	August 9, 1990	Proton K/DM-2	Ekran M	?	GEO	no	Second-stage engine shutoff because of termination of oxidizer supply due to fuel line being clogged by a wiping rag.
212	May 27, 1993	Proton K/DM-2	Gorizont	2500	GEO	no	Second- and third-stage engines suffered multiple burn-throughs of combustion chambers because of propellant contamination.
237	February 19, 1996	Proton K/DM-2	Raduga 33	1965	GTO	no	Block DM-2 stage failed at ignition for second burn. Suspected causes were failure of a tube joint, which could cause a propellant leak, or possible contamination of hypergolic start system.
243	November 16, 1996	Proton K/D-2	Mars 96	6825	Heliocentric	too low LEO	Block D-2 fourth-stage engine failed to reignite to boost spacecraft into desired transfer orbit; injection burn did not propel spacecraft out of Earth orbit. Spacecraft and upper stage reentered after a few hours. Root cause could not be determined because of lack of telemetry coverage, but suspected cause was failure of Mars 96 spacecraft, which was controlling Block D stage, or poor integration between spacecraft and stage.
252	December 24, 1997	Proton K/DM3	PAS-22	3410	GTO	inclined GTO	Block DM shut down early because of improperly coated turbopump seal, leaving spacecraft in high-inclination geosynchronous transfer orbit. Customer declared spacecraft a total loss and collected insurance payment. However, Hughes salvaged the spacecraft using spacecraft thrusters to raise orbit apogee to perform two lunar swingbys, which lowered inclination and raised perigee. Apogee was then lowered to achieve a geosynchronous orbit inclined 8 deg. Spacecraft has become available for limited use.
265	July 5, 1999	Proton K/Briz-M	Raduga 1-5	1965	GTO	no	Maiden flight of Briz-M upper stage. Contaminants from welding defect in the turbopump caused the second-stage engine No. 3 to catch fire, destroying the rear section of the stage.
268	October 27, 1999	Proton K/DM-2	Ekspress 1A	2600	GEO	no	Particulate contamination caused the turbine exhaust duct of second stage engine No. 1 to catch fire at T+223 s, resulting in rapid shutdown of the stage. This and the previous failure in July were attributed to poor workmanship at the Voronezh engine plant. Both engines were part of the same batch built in 1993, during a period when production decreased significantly.
295	November 26, 2002	Proton K/DM3	Astra 1K	2250	GTO	no	A failed valve caused excess fuel to collect in the Block DM main engine during the parking orbit coast phase after the first burn. The engine was destroyed.

== See also ==
- Comparison of heavy lift launch systems
- List of Proton launches
