= List of Proton launches (1980–1989) =

This is a list of launches made by the Proton rocket between 1980 and 1989. All launches were conducted from the Baikonur Cosmodrome.

== Launches ==
Date/time (UTC)	Configuration	Serial number	Launch pad	Outcome
Date/time (UTC)	Payload	Separation orbit	Operator	Function
Date/time (UTC)	Remarks			
=== 1980 ===
20 February 1980; 08:05	Proton-K/DM 8K82K/11S86	297-01	Site 200/39	Successful
20 February 1980; 08:05	Gran' #16L (Raduga)	Geosynchronous		Communications
20 February 1980; 08:05	First launch from Site 200/39			
14 June 1980; 00:49	Proton-K/DM 8K82K/11S86	303-02	Site 200/39	Successful
14 June 1980; 00:49	Gorizont #15L	Geosynchronous		Communications
14 July 1980; 22:35	Proton-K/DM 8K82K/11S86	301-01	Site 200/40	Successful
14 July 1980; 22:35	Ekran #19L	Geosynchronous		Communications
5 October 1980; 17:10	Proton-K/DM 8K82K/11S86	300-01	Site 200/39	Successful
5 October 1980; 17:10	Gran' #17L	Geosynchronous		Communications
26 December 1980; 11:49	Proton-K/DM 8K82K/11S86	304-01	Site 200/40	Successful
26 December 1980; 11:49	Ekran #20L	Geosynchronous		Communications
=== 1981 ===
18 March 1981; 04:40	Proton-K/DM 8K82K/11S86	306-01	Site 200/40	Successful
18 March 1981; 04:40	Gran' #18L	Geosynchronous		Communications
25 April 1981; 02:01	Proton-K 8K82K	299-02	Site 200/39	Successful
25 April 1981; 02:01	Kosmos 1267 (TKS #16301)	Low Earth		Technology
25 April 1981; 02:01	Spacecraft docked with Salyut 6			
25 June 1981; 23:55	Proton-K/DM 8K82K/11S86	305-01	Site 200/40	Successful
25 June 1981; 23:55	Ekran #21L	Geosynchronous		Communications
30 July 1981; 21:38	Proton-K/DM 8K82K/11S86	301-02	Site 200/39	Successful
30 July 1981; 21:38	Gran' #19L	Geosynchronous		Communications
9 October 1981, 16:59	Proton-K/DM 8K82K/11S86	310-01	Site 200/39	Successful
9 October 1981, 16:59	Gran' #20L	Geosynchronous		Communications
30 October 1981; 06:04	Proton-K/D-1 8K82K/11S824M	311-01	Site 200/40	Successful
30 October 1981; 06:04	Venera 13 (Venera 4V-1M #760)	Heliocentric		Venus probe
4 November 1981; 05:31	Proton-K/D-1 8K82K/11S824M	311-02	Site 200/39	Successful
4 November 1981; 05:31	Venera 14 (Venera 4V-1M #761)	Heliocentric		Venus probe
=== 1982 ===
5 February 1982; 09:12	Proton-K/DM 8K82K/11S86	308-01	Site 200/40	Successful
5 February 1982; 09:12	Ekran #22L	Geosynchronous		Communications
15 March 1982; 04:39	Proton-K/DM 8K82K/11S86	305-02	Site 200/39	Successful
15 March 1982; 04:39	Gorizont #14L	Geosynchronous		Communications
19 April 1982; 19:45	Proton-K 8K82K	306-02	Site 200/40	Successful
19 April 1982; 19:45	Salyut 7 (DOS-6)	Low Earth		Space station
17 May 1982; 23:50	Proton-K/DM 8K82K/11S86	310-02	Site 200/39	Successful
17 May 1982; 23:50	Kosmos 1366 (Geizer #11L)	Geosynchronous		Communications
22 July 1982; 22:11	Proton-K/DM 8K82K/11S86	307-02	Site 200/40	Failure
22 July 1982; 22:11	Ekran #23L	Geosynchronous (intended)		Communications
22 July 1982; 22:11	First stage hydraulic system malfunction. Automatic shutdown commanded T+45 seconds.			
16 September 1982; 18:31	Proton-K/DM 8K82K/11S86	309-01	Site 200/40	Successful
16 September 1982; 18:31	Ekran #24L	Geosynchronous		Communications
12 October 1982; 14:57	Proton-K/DM-2 8K82K/11S861	315-01	Site 200/39	Successful
12 October 1982; 14:57	Kosmos 1413 (Uragan #11L)	Medium Earth		Navigation
12 October 1982; 14:57	Kosmos 1414 (Uragan GVM)	Medium Earth		Boilerplate
12 October 1982; 14:57	Kosmos 1415 (Uragan GVM)	Medium Earth		Boilerplate
12 October 1982; 14:57	First Proton-K launch with Block DM-2 upper stage			
20 October 1982; 16:26	Proton-K/DM 8K82K/11S86	312-01	Site 200/40	Successful
20 October 1982; 16:26	Gorizont #16L	Geosynchronous		Communications
26 November 1982; 14:13	Proton-K/DM 8K82K/11S86	313-01	Site 200/39	Successful
26 November 1982; 14:13	Gran' #21L (Raduga)	Geosynchronous		Communications
24 December 1982; 12:00	Proton-K/DM 8K82K/11S86	314-01	Site 200/39	Failure
24 December 1982; 12:00	Gran' #22L (Raduga)	Geosynchronous (intended)		Communications
24 December 1982; 12:00	Second stage engine failure T+230 seconds due to high frequency vibration.			
=== 1983 ===
2 March 1983; 09:37	Proton-K 8K82K	309-02	Site 200/39	Successful
2 March 1983; 09:37	Kosmos 1443 (TKS-M #16401)	Low Earth		Logistics/Technology
2 March 1983; 09:37	Spacecraft docked with Salyut 7			
12 March 1983; 14:00	Proton-K/DM 8K82K/11S86	304-02	Site 200/40	Successful
12 March 1983; 14:00	Ekran #18L	Geosynchronous		Communications
23 March 1983; 12:45	Proton-K/D-1 8K82K/11S824M	307-01	Site 200/39	Successful
23 March 1983; 12:45	Astron (1A #602)	Highly elliptical		Astrophysical research
8 April 1983; 04:45	Proton-K/DM 8K82K/11S86	315-02	Site 200/40	Successful
8 April 1983; 04:45	Gran' #23L (Raduga)	Geosynchronous		Communications
2 June 1983; 02:38	Proton-K/D-1 8K82K/11S824M	321-01	Site 200/39	Successful
2 June 1983; 02:38	Venera 15 (Venera 4V-2 #860)	Heliocentric		Venus probe
7 June 1983; 02:32	Proton-K/D-1 8K82K/11S824M	321-01	Site 200/40	Successful
7 June 1983; 02:32	Venera 16 (Venera 4V-2 #861)	Heliocentric		Venus probe
30 June 1983; 23:56	Proton-K/DM 8K82K/11S86	314-02	Site 200/39	Successful
30 June 1983; 23:56	Gorizont #17L	Geosynchronous		Communications
10 August 1983; 18:24	Proton-K/DM-2 8K82K/11S861	317-01	Site 200/39	Successful
10 August 1983; 18:24	Kosmos 1490 (Uragan #12L)	Medium Earth		Navigation
10 August 1983; 18:24	Kosmos 1491 (Uragan #13L)	Medium Earth		Navigation
10 August 1983; 18:24	Kosmos 1492 (Uragan GVM)	Medium Earth		Boilerplate
25 August 1983; 20:02	Proton-K/DM 8K82K/11S86	316-02	Site 200/40	Successful
25 August 1983; 20:02	Gran' #24L (Raduga)	Geosynchronous		Communications
29 September 1983; 17:37	Proton-K/DM 8K82K/11S86	318-01	Site 200/40	Successful
29 September 1983; 17:37	Ekran #25L	Geosynchronous		Communications
30 November 1983; 13:51	Proton-K/DM 8K82K/11S86	308-02	Site 200/39	Successful
30 November 1983; 13:51	Gorizont #18L	Geosynchronous		Communications
29 December 1983; 00:52:24	Proton-K/DM-2 8K82K/11S861	317-01	Site 200/39	Successful
29 December 1983; 00:52:24	Kosmos 1519 (Uragan #14L)	Medium Earth		Navigation
29 December 1983; 00:52:24	Kosmos 1520 (Uragan #15L)	Medium Earth		Navigation
29 December 1983; 00:52:24	Kosmos 1521 (Uragan GVM)	Medium Earth		Boilerplate
=== 1984 ===
15 February 1984; 08:46	Proton-K/DM 8K82K/11S86	318-02	Site 200/39	Successful
15 February 1984; 08:46	Gran' #25L (Raduga)	Geosynchronous		Communications
2 March 1984; 03:54	Proton-K/DM 8K82K/11S86	316-01	Site 200/40	Successful
2 March 1984; 03:54	Kosmos 1540 (Geizer #12L)	Geosynchronous		Communications
16 March 1984; 14:00:00	Proton-K/DM 8K82K/11S86	322-01	Site 200/39	Successful
16 March 1984; 14:00:00	Ekran #26L	Geosynchronous		Communications
29 March 1984; 05:53	Proton-K/DM 8K82K/11S86	319-02	Site 200/40	Successful
29 March 1984; 05:53	Kosmos 1546 (Prognoz)	Geosynchronous		Missile defence
22 April 1984; 04:20:59	Proton-K/DM 8K82K/11S86	312-02	Site 200/39	Successful
22 April 1984; 04:20:59	Gorizont #19L	Geosynchronous		Communications
19 May 1984; 15:11	Proton-K/DM-2 8K82K/11S861	323-02	Site 200/40	Successful
19 May 1984; 15:11	Kosmos 1554 (Uragan #16L)	Medium Earth		Navigation
19 May 1984; 15:11	Kosmos 1555 (Uragan #17L)	Medium Earth		Navigation
19 May 1984; 15:11	Kosmos 1556 (Uragan GVM)	Medium Earth		Boilerplate
22 June 1984; 00:20:00	Proton-K/DM 8K82K/11S86	319-01	Site 200/39	Successful
22 June 1984; 00:20:00	Gran' #27L (Raduga)	Geosynchronous		Communications
1 August 1984; 21:36:59	Proton-K/DM 8K82K/11S86	324-01	Site 200/40	Successful
1 August 1984; 21:36:59	Gorizont #20L	Geosynchronous		Communications
24 August 1984; 19:50:00	Proton-K/DM 8K82K/11S86	324-02	Site 200/39	Successful
24 August 1984; 19:50:00	Ekran #27L	Geosynchronous		Communications
4 September 1984; 15:49:53	Proton-K/DM-2 8K82K/11S861	320-01	Site 200/40	Successful
4 September 1984; 15:49:53	Kosmos 1593 (Uragan #18L)	Medium Earth		Navigation
4 September 1984; 15:49:53	Kosmos 1594 (Uragan #19L)	Medium Earth		Navigation
4 September 1984; 15:49:53	Kosmos 1595 (Uragan GVM)	Medium Earth		Boilerplate
28 September 1984; 14:00	Proton-K/DM-2 8K82K/11S861	327-02	Site 200/39	Successful
28 September 1984; 14:00	Kosmos 1603 (Tselina-2)	Low Earth		ELINT
15 December 1984; 09:16:24	Proton-K/D-1 8K82K/11S824M	329-01	Site 200/39	Successful
15 December 1984; 09:16:24	Vega 1 (Venera-5VK #901)	Heliocentric		Planetary probe
15 December 1984; 09:16:24	Visited Venus and Halley's Comet			
21 December 1984; 09:13:51	Proton-K/D-1 8K82K/11S824M	325-02	Site 200/40	Successful
21 December 1984; 09:13:51	Vega 2 (Venera-5VK #902)	Heliocentric		Planetary probe
21 December 1984; 09:13:51	Visited Venus and Halley's Comet			
=== 1985 ===
18 January 1985; 10:25:00	Proton-K/DM 8K82K/11S86	326-02	Site 200/39	Successful
18 January 1985; 10:25:00	Gorizont #21L	Geosynchronous		Communications
21 February 1985; 07:57	Proton-K/DM 8K82K/11S86	327-01	Site 200/39	Successful
21 February 1985; 07:57	Kosmos 1629 (Prognoz)	Geosynchronous		Missile defence
22 March 1985; 05:00:00	Proton-K/DM 8K82K/11S86	328-01	Site 200/40	Successful
22 March 1985; 05:00:00	Ekran #28L	Geosynchronous		Communications
17 May 1985; 22:28	Proton-K/DM-2 8K82K/11S861	330-02	Site 200/39	Successful
17 May 1985; 22:28	Kosmos 1650 (Uragan #20L)	Medium Earth		Navigation
17 May 1985; 22:28	Kosmos 1651 (Uragan #21L)	Medium Earth		Navigation
17 May 1985; 22:28	Kosmos 1652 (Uragan GVM)	Medium Earth		Boilerplate
30 May 1985; 14:59	Proton-K/DM-2 8K82K/11S861	313-02	Site 200/40	Successful
30 May 1985; 14:59	Kosmos 1656 (Tselina-2)	Low Earth		ELINT
8 August 1985; 21:01:00	Proton-K/DM 8K82K/11S86	317-02	Site 200/39	Successful
8 August 1985; 21:01:00	Gran' #26L (Raduga)	Geosynchronous		Communications
27 September 1985; 08:41:42	Proton-K 8K82K	331-01	Site 200/39	Successful
27 September 1985; 08:41:42	Kosmos 1686 (TKS-M #16501)	Low Earth		Logistics/Technology
27 September 1985; 08:41:42	Spacecraft docked with Salyut 7			
25 October 1985; 15:45:00	Proton-K/DM-2 8K82K/11S861	332-02	Site 200/40	Successful
25 October 1985; 15:45:00	Kosmos 1700 (Luch #11L)	Geosynchronous		Communications
15 November 1985; 14:29:00	Proton-K/DM 8K82K/11S86	326-01	Site 200/39	Successful
15 November 1985; 14:29:00	Gran' #28L (Raduga)	Geosynchronous		Communications
24 December 1985; 21:43:28	Proton-K/DM-2 8K82K/11S861	334-02	Site 200/39	Successful
24 December 1985; 21:43:28	Kosmos 1710 (Uragan #22L)	Medium Earth		Navigation
24 December 1985; 21:43:28	Kosmos 1711 (Uragan #23L)	Medium Earth		Navigation
24 December 1985; 21:43:28	Kosmos 1712 (Uragan GVM)	Medium Earth		Boilerplate
=== 1986 ===
17 January 1986; 10:20:00	Proton-K/DM 8K82K/11S86	331-02	Site 200/40	Successful
17 January 1986; 10:20:00	Gran' #29L (Raduga)	Geosynchronous		Communications
19 February 1986; 21:28:23	Proton-K 8K82K	337-01	Site 200/39	Successful
19 February 1986; 21:28:23	Mir Core (DOS-7)	Low Earth		Space station module
19 February 1986; 21:28:23	First module of Mir			
4 April 1986; 03:45:00	Proton-K/DM 8K82K/11S86	302-01	Site 200/40	Successful
4 April 1986; 03:45:00	Kosmos 1738 (Geizer #13L)	Geosynchronous		Communications
24 May 1986; 01:41:59	Proton-K/DM 8K82K/11S86	333-01	Site 200/39	Successful
24 May 1986; 01:41:59	Ekran #30L	Geosynchronous		Communications
10 June 1986; 00:48:59	Proton-K/DM 8K82K/11S86	322-02	Site 200/40	Successful
10 June 1986; 00:48:59	Gorizont #24L	Geosynchronous		Communications
16 September 1986; 11:38:09	Proton-K/DM-2 8K82K/11S861	336-01	Site 200/40	Successful
16 September 1986; 11:38:09	Kosmos 1778 (Uragan #24L)	Medium Earth		Navigation
16 September 1986; 11:38:09	Kosmos 1779 (Uragan #25L)	Medium Earth		Navigation
16 September 1986; 11:38:09	Kosmos 1780 (Uragan #26L)	Medium Earth		Navigation
25 October 1986; 15:43:00	Proton-K/DM 8K82K/11S86	335-02	Site 200/40	Successful
25 October 1986; 15:43:00	Gran' #30L (Raduga)	Geosynchronous		Communications
18 November 1986; 14:08:03	Proton-K/DM 8K82K/11S86	334-01	Site 200/39	Successful
18 November 1986; 14:08:03	Gorizont #22L	Geosynchronous		Communications
29 November 1986; 08:00	Proton-K 8K82K	338-01	Site 200/40	Failure
29 November 1986; 08:00	Mech-K #303	Low Earth		Radar reconnaissance
29 November 1986; 08:00	Second stage control failure. Vibration caused separation of an electrical relay.			
=== 1987 ===
30 January 1987; 09:19:00	Proton-K/DM-2 8K82K/11S861	341-01	Site 200/40	Failure
30 January 1987; 09:19:00	Kosmos 1817 (Ekran-M #11L)	Geosynchronous (intended); Low Earth (achieved)		Communications
30 January 1987; 09:19:00	Upper stage failed to ignite			
19 March 1987; 03:54:00	Proton-K/DM 8K82K/11S86	323-01	Site 200/40	Successful
19 March 1987; 03:54:00	Gran' #31L (Raduga)	Geosynchronous		Communications
31 March 1987; 00:16:16	Proton-K 8K82K	336-02	Site 200/39	Successful
31 March 1987; 00:16:16	Kvant-1	Low Earth		Space station module
31 March 1987; 00:16:16	Second module of Mir			
24 April 1987; 12:42:54	Proton-K/DM-2 8K82K/11S861	335-01	Site 200/40	Failure
24 April 1987; 12:42:54	Kosmos 1838 (Uragan #30L)	Medium Earth (intended); Low Earth (achieved)		Navigation
24 April 1987; 12:42:54	Kosmos 1839 (Uragan #31L)	Medium Earth (intended); Low Earth (achieved)		Navigation
24 April 1987; 12:42:54	Kosmos 1840 (Uragan #32L)	Medium Earth (intended); Low Earth (achieved)		Navigation
24 April 1987; 12:42:54	Upper stage malfunctioned			
11 May 1987; 14:45:00	Proton-K/DM 8K82K/11S86	338-02	Site 200/39	Successful
11 May 1987; 14:45:00	Gorizont #23L	Geosynchronous		Communications
25 July 1987; 09:00:00	Proton-K 8K82K	347-01	Site 200/40	Successful
25 July 1987; 09:00:00	Kosmos 1870 (Mech-K #304)	Low Earth		Radar reconnaissance
3 September 1987; 19:26:00	Proton-K/DM 8K82K/11S86	337-02	Site 200/39	Successful
3 September 1987; 19:26:00	Ekran #29L	Geosynchronous		Communications
16 September 1987; 02:53:31	Proton-K/DM-2 8K82K/11S861	339-02	Site 200/40	Successful
16 September 1987; 02:53:31	Kosmos 1883 (Uragan #33L)	Medium Earth		Navigation
16 September 1987; 02:53:31	Kosmos 1884 (Uragan #34L)	Medium Earth		Navigation
16 September 1987; 02:53:31	Kosmos 1885 (Uragan #35L)	Medium Earth		Navigation
1 October 1987; 17:09:00	Proton-K/DM-2 8K82K/11S861	328-02	Site 200/39	Successful
1 October 1987; 17:09:00	Kosmos 1888 (Geizer #15L)	Geosynchronous		Communications
28 October 1987; 15:15:00	Proton-K/DM-2 8K82K/11S861	325-01	Site 200/40	Successful
28 October 1987; 15:15:00	Kosmos 1894 (Prognoz)	Geosynchronous		Missile defence
26 November 1987; 13:28:00	Proton-K/DM-2 8K82K/11S861	330-01	Site 200/39	Successful
26 November 1987; 13:28:00	Kosmos 1897 (Luch #12L)	Geosynchronous		Communications
10 December 1987; 11:30:00	Proton-K/DM 8K82K/11S86	343-01	Site 200/40	Successful
10 December 1987; 11:30:00	Gran' #32L (Raduga)	Geosynchronous		Communications
27 December 1987; 11:25:00	Proton-K/DM-2 8K82K/11S861	345-01	Site 200/39	Successful
27 December 1987; 11:25:00	Ekran-M #13L	Geosynchronous		Communications
=== 1988 ===
18 January 1988; 09:58:00	Proton-K/DM-2 8K82K/11S861	341-02	Site 200/40	Failure
18 January 1988; 09:58:00	Gorizont #25L	Geosynchronous (intended)		Communications
18 January 1988; 09:58:00	Third stage failure T+540 seconds due to disintegration of a propellant feed line.			
17 February 1988; 00:23:22	Proton-K/DM-2 8K82K/11S861	346-02	Site 200/39	Failure
17 February 1988; 00:23:22	Kosmos 1917 (Uragan #38L)	Medium Earth (intended); Low Earth (achieved)		Navigation
17 February 1988; 00:23:22	Kosmos 1918 (Uragan #37L)	Medium Earth (intended); Low Earth (achieved)		Navigation
17 February 1988; 00:23:22	Kosmos 1919 (Uragan #36L)	Medium Earth (intended); Low Earth (achieved)		Navigation
17 February 1988; 00:23:22	Blok D failure caused by ingestion of debris.			
31 March 1988; 04:18:00	Proton-K/DM 8K82K/11S86	343-02	Site 200/40	Successful
31 March 1988; 04:18:00	Gorizont #26L	Geosynchronous		Communications
26 April 1988; 03:15:10	Proton-K/DM-2 8K82K/11S861	332-01	Site 200/39	Successful
26 April 1988; 03:15:10	Kosmos 1940 (Prognoz)	Geosynchronous		Missile defence
6 May 1988; 02:47:00	Proton-K/DM 8K82K/11S86	349-01	Site 200/39	Successful
6 May 1988; 02:47:00	Ekran #31L	Geosynchronous		Communications
21 May 1988; 17:57:00	Proton-K/DM-2 8K82K/11S861	348-01	Site 200/39	Successful
21 May 1988; 17:57:00	Kosmos 1946 (Uragan #39L)	Medium Earth		Navigation
21 May 1988; 17:57:00	Kosmos 1947 (Uragan #40L)	Medium Earth		Navigation
21 May 1988; 17:57:00	Kosmos 1948 (Uragan #41L)	Medium Earth		Navigation
7 July 1988; 17:38:04	Proton-K/D-2 8K82K/11S824F	356-02	Site 200/39	Successful
7 July 1988; 17:38:04	Fobos 1	Heliocentric		Mars orbiter
7 July 1988; 17:38:04	First flight of Proton-K with Block D-2 upper stage, spacecraft later failed			
12 July 1988; 17:01:43	Proton-K/D-2 8K82K/11S824F	356-01	Site 200/40	Successful
12 July 1988; 17:01:43	Fobos 2	Heliocentric		Mars orbiter
1 August 1988; 21:04:00	Proton-K/DM-2 8K82K/11S861	351-01	Site 200/39	Successful
1 August 1988; 21:04:00	Kosmos 1961 (Geizer #16L)	Geosynchronous		Communications
18 August 1988; 19:52:00	Proton-K/DM-2 8K82K/11S861	333-02	Site 200/40	Successful
18 August 1988; 19:52:00	Gorizont #28L	Geosynchronous		Communications
16 September 1988; 02:00:47	Proton-K/DM-2 8K82K/11S861	349-02	Site 200/39	Successful
16 September 1988; 02:00:47	Kosmos 1970 (Uragan #42L)	Medium Earth		Navigation
16 September 1988; 02:00:47	Kosmos 1971 (Uragan #43L)	Medium Earth		Navigation
16 September 1988; 02:00:47	Kosmos 1972 (Uragan #44L)	Medium Earth		Navigation
20 October 1988; 15:43:00	Proton-K/DM-2 8K82K/11S861	339-01	Site 200/39	Successful
20 October 1988; 15:43:00	Gran' #34L (Raduga)	Geosynchronous		Communications
10 December 1988; 11:53:59	Proton-K/DM-2 8K82K/11S861	329-02	Site 200/40	Successful
10 December 1988; 11:53:59	Ekran-M #12L	Geosynchronous		Communications
=== 1989 ===
10 January 1989; 02:05:25	Proton-K/DM-2 8K82K/11S861	350-02	Site 200/39	Successful
10 January 1989; 02:05:25	Kosmos 1987 (Uragan #27L)	Medium Earth		Navigation
10 January 1989; 02:05:25	Kosmos 1988 (Uragan #45L)	Medium Earth		Navigation
10 January 1989; 02:05:25	Kosmos 1989 (Etalon-PKA #1L)	Medium Earth		Geodesy
26 January 1989; 09:15:59	Proton-K/DM-2 8K82K/11S861	351-02	Site 200/40	Successful
26 January 1989; 09:15:59	Gorizont #29L	Geosynchronous		Communications
14 April 1989; 04:08:00	Proton-K/DM-2 8K82K/11S861	359-02	Site 200/39	Successful
14 April 1989; 04:08:00	Gran' #33L (Raduga)	Geosynchronous		Communications
31 May 1989; 08:31:59	Proton-K/DM-2 8K82K/11S861	352-02	Site 200/40	Successful
31 May 1989; 08:31:59	Kosmos 2022 (Uragan #28L)	Medium Earth		Navigation
31 May 1989; 08:31:59	Kosmos 2023 (Uragan #29L)	Medium Earth		Navigation
31 May 1989; 08:31:59	Kosmos 2024 (Etalon-PKA #2L)	Medium Earth		Geodesy
21 June 1989; 23:35:00	Proton-K/DM-2 8K82K/11S861	355-02	Site 200/39	Successful
21 June 1989; 23:35:00	Globus #11 (Raduga-1)	Geosynchronous		Communications
5 July 1989; 22:44:59	Proton-K/DM-2 8K82K/11S861	340-02	Site 200/40	Successful
5 July 1989; 22:44:59	Gorizont #27L	Geosynchronous		Communications
28 September 1989; 17:04:59	Proton-K/DM-2 8K82K/11S861	346-01	Site 200/40	Successful
28 September 1989; 17:04:59	Gorizont #31L	Geosynchronous		Communications
26 November 1989; 13:01:41	Proton-K 8K82K	354-01	Site 200/39	Successful
26 November 1989; 13:01:41	Kvant-2	Low Earth		Space station module
26 November 1989; 13:01:41	Third module of Mir			
1 December 1989; 20:20:56	Proton-K/D-1 8K82K/11S824M	352-01	Site 200/40	Successful
1 December 1989; 20:20:56	Granat (1AS #1)	Heliocentric		Astronomy
15 December 1989; 11:30:00	Proton-K/DM-2 8K82K/11S861	344-01	Site 81/23	Successful
15 December 1989; 11:30:00	Gran' #36L (Raduga)	Geosynchronous		Communications
27 December 1989; 11:10:00	Proton-K/DM-2 8K82K/11S861	347-02	Site 200/39	Successful
27 December 1989; 11:10:00	Kosmos 2054 (Luch #14L)	Geosynchronous		Communications
