= Chelomey =

Chelomey may refer to:

- 8608 Chelomey, main-belt asteroid
- Vladimir Chelomey (1914–1984), Soviet mechanics scientist
