= Proton (satellite program) =

Series of Soviet satellites

Proton 1, 2, 3, and 4
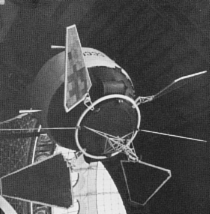
- A Proton satellite
- Mission type: Astronomy
- Operator: Soviet Union
- COSPAR ID: 1965-054A (Proton 1); 1965-087A (Proton 2); 1966-060A (Proton 3); 1968-103A (Proton 4)

Spacecraft properties
- Manufacturer: OKB-52
- Launch mass: 12,200 kg (26,900 lb) (Proton 1); 12,200 kg (26,900 lb) (Proton 2); 12,200 kg (26,900 lb) (Proton 3); 17,000 kg (37,000 lb) (Proton 4)

Start of mission
- Launch date: Proton 1: 16 July 1965 11:16 UTC; Proton 2: 2 November 1965 12:28 UTC; Proton 3: 6 July 1966 12:57 UTC; Proton 4: 16 November 1968 11:40 UTC
- Rocket: UR-500 (1–3), Proton-K (4)
- Launch site: Baikonur Cosmodrome Site 81/23 (1–3), Baikonur Cosmodrome Site 81/24 (4)

End of mission
- Disposal: De-orbited
- Decay date: Proton 1: 11 October 1965; Proton 2: 6 February 1966; Proton 3: 16 September 1966; Proton 4: 24 July 1969

Orbital parameters
- Reference system: Geocentric
- Eccentricity: .030 (1–3), .017 (4)
- Perigee altitude: Proton 1: 183 kilometres (114 mi); Proton 2: 189 kilometres (117 mi); Proton 3: 185 kilometres (115 mi); Proton 4: 248 kilometres (154 mi)
- Apogee altitude: Proton 1: 589 kilometres (366 mi); Proton 2: 608 kilometres (378 mi); Proton 3: 585 kilometres (364 mi); Proton 4: 477 kilometres (296 mi)
- Inclination: 63.5° (1–3), 31.5° (4)
- Period: ~92 minutes (1–4)

Proton (Russian: протон) ('proton') was a Soviet series of four cosmic ray and elementary particle detecting satellites. Orbited 1965–68, three on test flights of the UR-500 ICBM and one on a Proton-K rocket, all four satellites completed their missions successfully, the last reentering the Earth's atmosphere in 1969.

== Background ==
The Proton satellites were heavy automated laboratories launched 1965–68 to study high energy particles and cosmic rays. These satellites were built to utilize the test launches of the UR-500, a heavy two-stage ICBM designed by Vladimir Chelomey's OKB-52 to carry a 100-megaton nuclear payload. Each Proton was housed in a purpose-built third stage added to the UR-500 stack.

== Spacecraft design ==
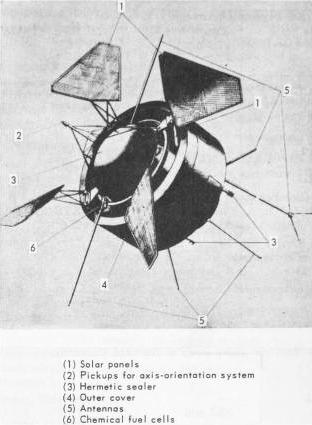
Schematic of the Proton satellite

Protons 1–3 were largely identical craft massing 12,200 kg (26,900 lb), with scientific packages developed under the supervision of Academician Sergey Nikolayevich Vernov of Moscow State University's Scientific-Research Institute of Nuclear Physics. Experiments included a gamma-ray telescope, a scintillator telescope, and proportional counters. The counters were able to determine the total energy of each super-high energy cosmic particle individually, a capability no prior satellite had possessed. Though the equipment had been developed eight years earlier (by Professor N. L. Grigorov), the UR-500 was the first booster powerful enough to orbit a satellite carrying the sensitive particle counter. The counters could measure cosmic rays with energy levels up to 100 million eV.

Proton 3 also was equipped with a gas-Cerenkov-scintillator telescope to attempt to detect the newly postulated fundamental particle, the quark. The entire experiment package massed 4,000 kg (8,800 lb) and was composed of metal, plastic, and paraffin blocks.

Telemetry was relayed via a 19.910 MHz beacon. Four solar panels powered the crafts, which were cooled by heat exchangers. The Protons were spin-stabilized, their attitude controlled by jet and an on-board dampener. Satellite systems were controlled by an internal computer.

Proton 4 was considerably more massive at 17,000 kg (37,000 lb). Its primary instrument was an ionization calorimeter composed of steel bars and plastic scintillators. A measuring device comprising one lump of carbon and another of polyethylene provided data on cosmic rays and the energy spectrum in orbit, the possible collisions of cosmic ray particles with atmospheric nuclei of hydrogen, carbon, and iron, and continued the search for the quark.

== Missions ==
=== Proton 1 ===
Proton 1 was launched into Earth orbit 16 July 1965 11:16 UTC from Baikonur Cosmodrome Site 81/23, though the launch was threatened by a leak in the oxidizer pipeline resulting in nitrogen tetroxide spilling on electrical wires. Early in the flight, launch specialists only received signals indicating that the satellite was functioning. Eventually, however, Proton 1 performed normally, returning physics data on ultra-high-energy cosmic particles. Its mission lasted 45 days, and the satellite reentered Earth's atmosphere 11 October 1965.

=== Proton 2 ===
The virtually identical Proton 2 was launched 2 November 1965 12:28 UTC, also from Baikonur Cosmodrome Site 81/23. It reentered Earth's atmosphere on 6 February 1966. At the time of their launch, American experts believed the first Protons were experimental space station components due to their weight and the Soviet use of the word "station" in describing the observatory satellites.

=== Proton 3 ===
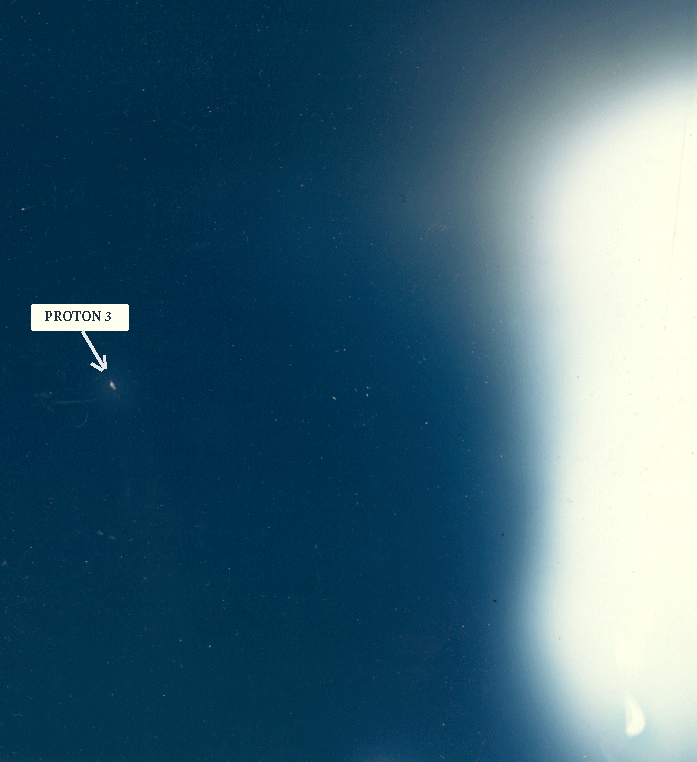
Proton 3 as seen from Gemini 11, 13 September 1966

After an unsuccessful launch of the third test UR-500 on 24 March 1966 14:39 UTC, Proton 3 was successfully launched into Earth orbit from Baikonur Cosmodrome Site 81/23 on 6 July 1966 12:57 UTC on the fourth and final UR-500 test flight and began searching for quarks and other elementary particles of fractional electron charge. The satellite returned data for most, if not all, of its short time in orbit, reentering Earth's atmosphere on 16 September 1966. Shortly before reentry, Proton 3 was observed tumbling once per second over the Indian Ocean by the crew of Gemini 11.

=== Proton 4 ===
After the end of the run of UR-500 test launches, the rocket (now designated Proton) and its successors were largely employed in the launch of the Zond lunar spacecraft. However, on 16 November 1968 11:40 UTC, the final and much larger Proton 4 was launched into orbit via Proton-K rocket from Baikonur Cosmodrome Site 81/24 to continue the search for the quark and supplement the earlier Proton satellites' cosmic ray measurements. This final Proton reentered Earth's atmosphere on 24 July 1969.

== Legacy ==
The Proton satellites were heralded by Soviet media as the start of a new stage in Soviet space exploration. The success of Proton afforded Chelomey a status in the Soviet rocket industry equal to that of Sergei Korolev of OKB-1 (developer of Sputnik, Vostok, and Voskhod) and Mikhail Yangel of OKB-456 (an important designer of military missiles). The UR-500, originally named "Gerkules" (Russian: Геркулес) ('Hercules'), was renamed "Proton" when news reports conflated the launcher and its payload. Though the Proton was never used in the ICBM role it had been built for, the rocket became an extraordinarily successful booster for commercial satellites, serving well into the 1990s.

== See also ==
- Soviet space program
