= Vladimir Chelomey =

Soviet scientist and engineer

- Владимир Челомей; Володимир Челомей
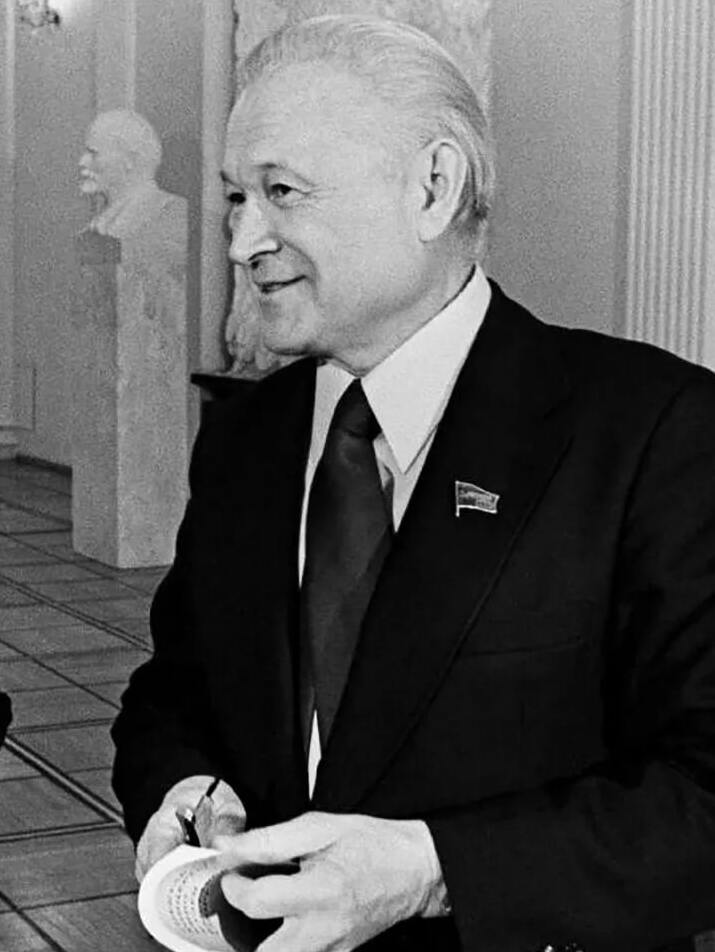
- Born: 30 June 1914; Siedlce, Lublin Governorate, Russian Empire (now Poland)
- Died: 8 December 1984 (aged 70); Moscow, Russian SFSR, Soviet Union
- Resting place: Novodevichy Cemetery, Moscow
- Education: National Academy of Sciences of Ukraine
- Known for: Creation of the first Soviet pulse jet engine, development of Proton rockets and UR-100, UR-200, UR-500 and UR-700 ICBMs.
- Awards: Twice Hero of Socialist Labour
- Scientific career
- Fields: Rocket engineering
- Workplaces: Kyiv Polytechnic Institute; Institute of Mathematics of the National Academy of Sciences of Ukraine; National Aviation University; Baranov Central Institute of Aviation Motor Development

Signature
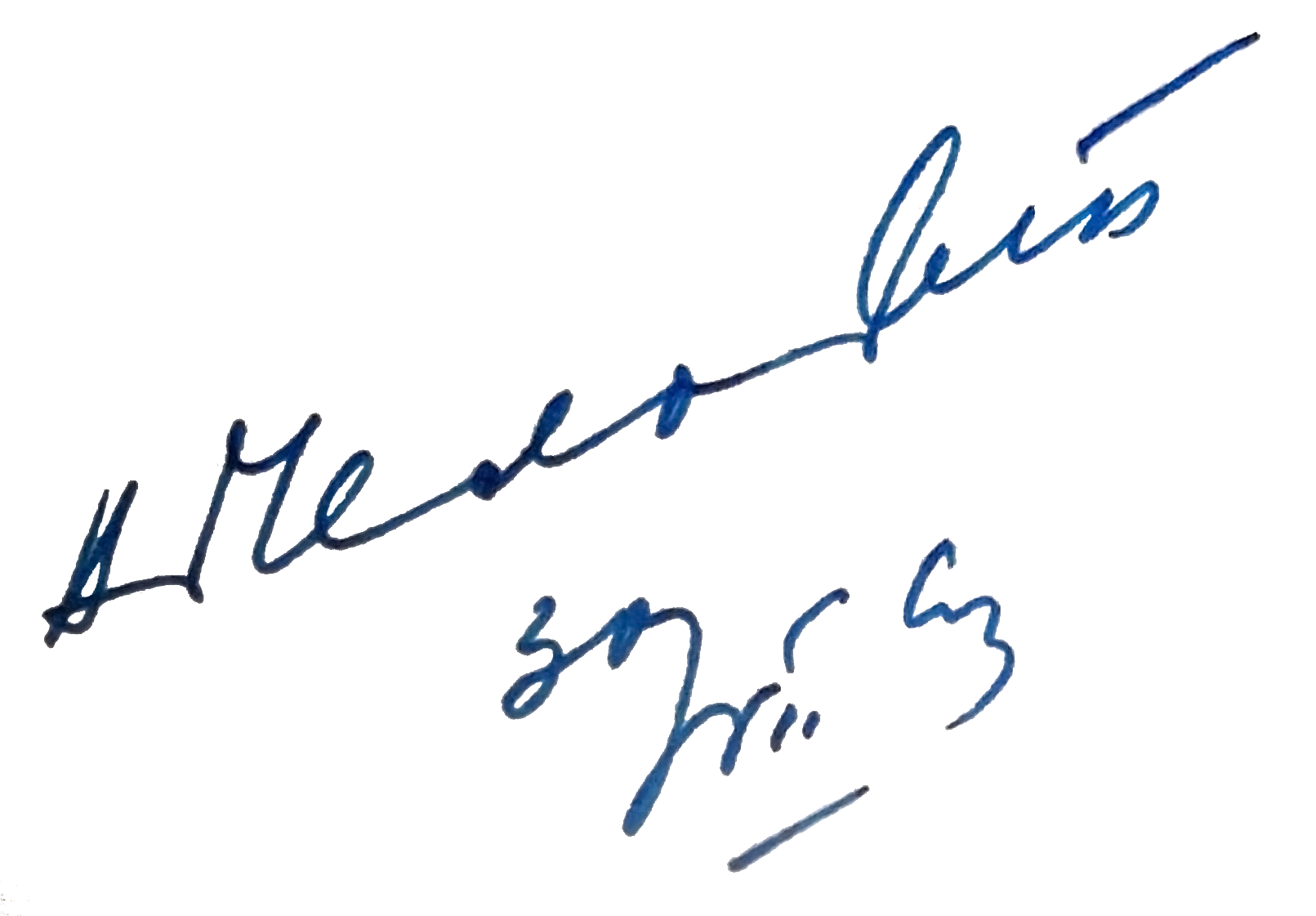

Vladimir Nikolayevich Chelomey or Chelomei (Russian: Влади́мир Никола́евич Челоме́й, Ukrainian: Володи́мир Микола́йович Челоме́й, Volodymyr Mykolayovych Chelomey; 30 June 1914 – 8 December 1984) was a Soviet engineer and designer in the missile program of the former Soviet Union. He invented the first Soviet pulse jet engine and was responsible for developing the world's first anti-ship cruise missiles and the ICBM program of the Soviet Union such as the UR-100, UR-200, UR-500 and UR-700.

== Early life ==
Chelomey was born to a Ukrainian family in Siedlce, Lublin Governorate, Russian Empire (now Poland). At the age of three months, his family fled to Poltava, Ukraine, when the Eastern Front of World War I came close to Siedlce.

When Chelomey was 12 years old, the family moved again to Kyiv.

In 1932, Chelomey was admitted to the Kyiv Polytechnic Institute (later the basis of Kyiv Aviation Institute), where he showed himself as a student with outstanding talent. In 1936, his first book Vector Analysis was published. Studying at the institute, Chelomey also attended lectures on mathematical analysis, theory of differential equations, mathematical physics, theory of elasticity and mechanics in the Kyiv University. He also attended lectures by Tullio Levi-Civita in the Ukrainian SSR Academy of Sciences. Namely in this time Chelomey became interested in mechanics and in the theory of oscillations and remained interested the rest of his life. In 1937, Chelomey graduated from the institute with honours. After that he worked there as a lecturer, defending a dissertation for the Candidate of Science (in 1939).

== World War II ==
From the beginning of the Great Patriotic War in 1941, Chelomey worked at the Baranov Central Institute of Aviation Motor Building (TsIAM) in Moscow, where he created the first Soviet pulsating air jet engine in 1942, independently of similar contemporary developments in Nazi Germany.

In the summer of 1944, it became known that Nazi Germany used V-1 cruise missiles against Southern England. On 9 October 1944, following a decision by the USSR State Defense Committee and People's Commissar for Aviation Industry Alexey Shakhurin, Chelomey was appointed the Director and Chief Designer of Plant N51 (its previous director Nikolay Polikarpov having died a short time before). Chelomey was to design, build, and test the first Soviet cruise missile as soon as possible. As early as December 1944, the missile, code-named 10Kh, was test fired from Petlyakov Pe-8 and Tupolev Tu-2 aircraft.

== OKB-52 and academic career ==
Following his success with the 10Kh, the USSR Special Design Bureau on designing pilot-less aircraft (OKB-52) was established under Chelomey's. In 1955, Chelomey was appointed the Chief Designer of the OKB-52, where he continued to work on cruise missiles.

Chelomey continued his scientific research, earning a doctorate in science from Bauman Moscow Higher Technical School. After his dissertation defense in 1951, he became a professor at the School in 1952.

In 1958, OKB-52 put forward a proposal for a multi-stage Intercontinental ballistic missile. Although their UR-200 rocket design was rejected in favour of Mikhail Yangel's R-36 (NATO designation SS-9 Scarp), their UR-100 design was accepted.

Chelomey's OKB was part of the General Machine-Building Ministry headed by Sergey Afanasyev.

== Spacecraft ==
In 1959, Chelomey was appointed the Chief Designer of Aviation Equipment.

OKB-52, along with designing ICBMs, started to work on spacecraft, and in 1961 began work on a design for a much more powerful ICBM, the UR-500, although it was rather quickly rejected as impractical to use as a missile.

In 1962, Chelomey became an Academician of the USSR Academy of Sciences, Mechanics Department.

Chelomey became Sergey Korolev's internal competitor in the "Moon race". Chelomey proposed that the powerful UR-500 be used to launch a small two-man craft on a lunar flyby, and managed to gain support for his proposal by employing Nikita Khrushchev's son, Sergei Khrushchev. He also claimed the UR-500 could be used to launch a military space station.

An argument between Sergey Korolev and rocket engine designer Valentin Glushko over personal issues and whether the N1 should be fueled with RP-1 / LOX or Hypergolic propellant resulted in Glushko and Korolev refusing to work with each other, causing Glushko to instead offer his RD-253 rocket engine to Chelomey, who adopted it for his UR-500.

On 3 August 1964 the Central Committee of the Communist Party and the USSR Council of Ministers adopted and signed Decree #655-268 On Work on Research on the Moon and Outer Space, which redefined Chelomey's and Korolev's roles in the space program: Korolev was now responsible for development of the N1, which was chosen to accomplish a crewed lunar landing, while Chelomei was assigned to the development of the UR-500 which was chosen to perform a crewed circumlunar flight. The projects continued to work separately side-by-side. The first launch of the UR-500 (also known as Proton) took place in early 1965.

Although it was never used to send cosmonauts to the Moon as Chelomey had hoped, Proton became the staple heavy lift launch vehicle of the Soviet/Russian fleet and would be used over the years for planetary probes, space stations, geosynchronous satellites, and more.

Chelomey's OKB also designed anti-satellite weapons such as Polyot. Unlike earlier satellites, Chelomey's Polyot-1 (1963) and Polyot-2 (1964) were equipped with an propulsion bus which enabled them to change their orbits. He also headed the development of the Proton satellite. In the 1970s Chelomey's OKB proposed non-realised Proton-based 20-ton LKS (Kosmolyot) spaceplane and worked on the Almaz military orbital stations (flown as Salyut 2, Salyut 3 and Salyut 5) which also became the basis for the Salyut, Mir and Zvezda civil space stations. To support his Almaz stations, Chelomey designed the TKS, as a large alternative to Soyuz. The TKS never flew crewed as planned but derivatives flew as modules on Salyut 7 and Mir. In the 1980s Chelomey's OKB proposed non-realised 15-ton Uragan spaceplane based on Zenit-2 launcher.

== Anti-ship missiles ==
SS-N-3 Shaddock

He is reported to have led the construction of the P-80 Zubr anti-ship missile, and it may be presumed that he was involved in the related P-100 Oniks missile.

== Death ==
Chelomey died in Moscow on 8 December 1984 at the age of 70, suffering a fatal stroke while on the phone with his wife. He had been admitted to the hospital three days prior after breaking his leg in his dacha. He was buried at Novodevichy Cemetery.

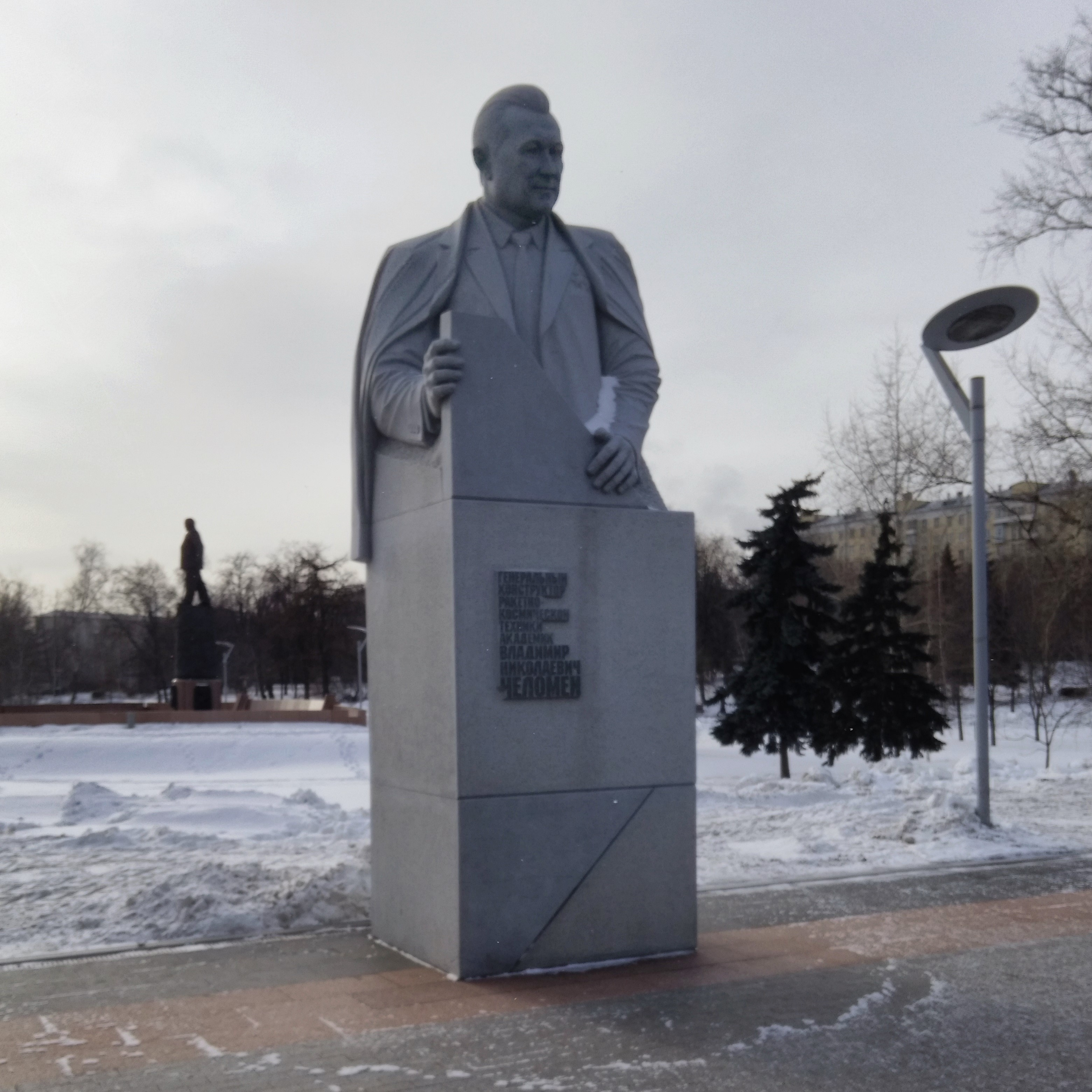
Vladimir Chelomey Memorial Memorial Museum of Cosmonautics, Moscow.

== Awards ==
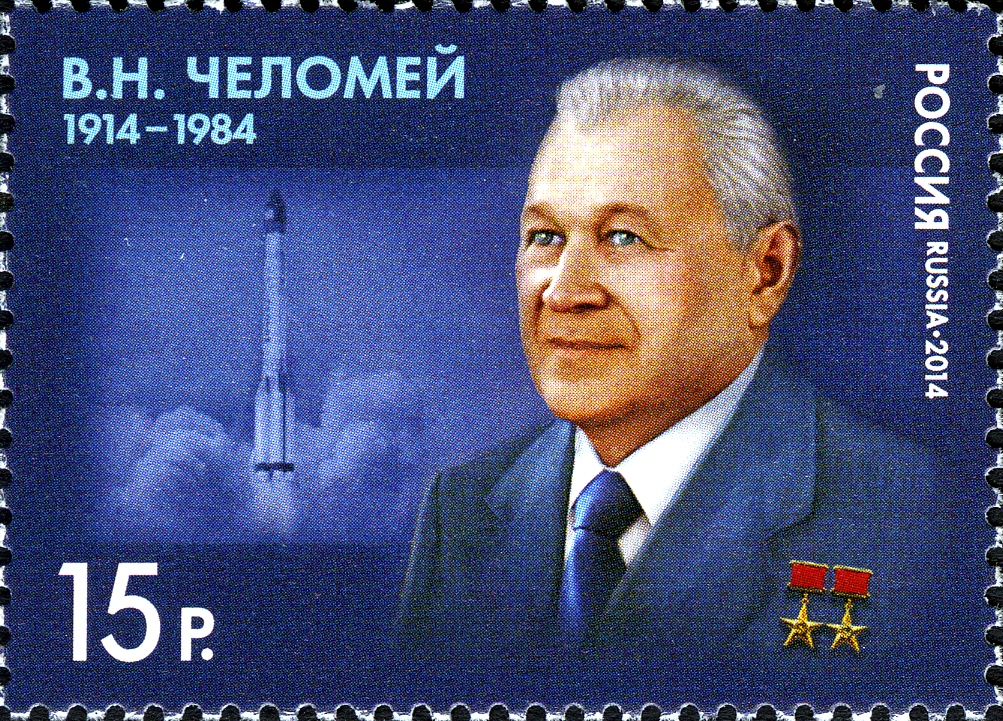
2014 Russian stamp commemorating the 100th birth anniversary of Vladimir Chelomey

- Two times Hero of Socialist Labor (1959, 1963)
- USSR State Prize (1967, 1974, 1982)
- Lenin Prize (1959)
- Four Orders of Lenin
- Order of the October Revolution

== See also ==
- Mikhail Yangel
- Sergei Korolev
