= RD-253 =

Soviet engine design used on the first stage of Proton rockets

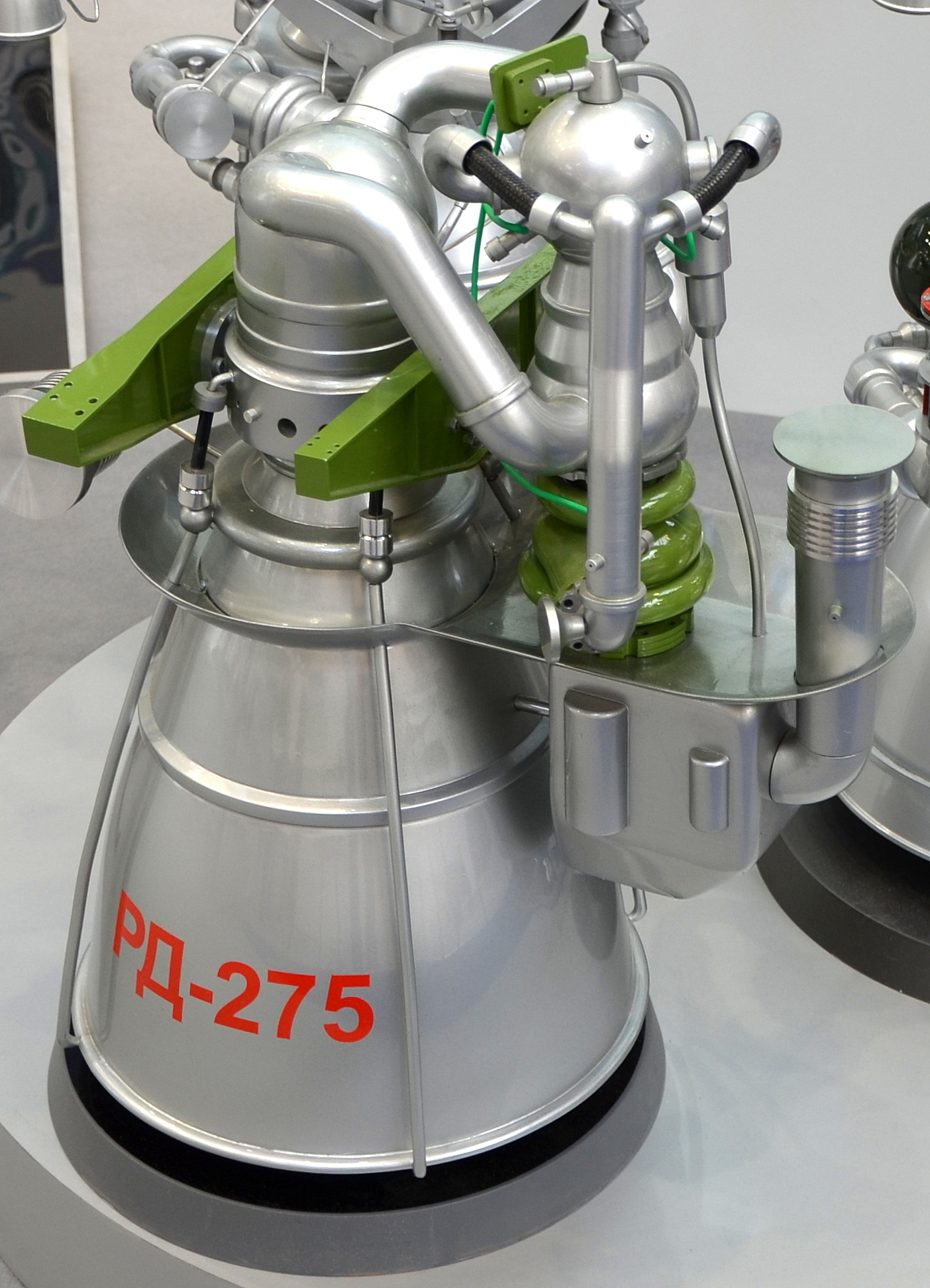
- Mock-up of a RD-275 rocket motor at the Paris Air Show in 2013
- Country of origin: Soviet Union; Russia
- First flight: RD-253: 1965; RD-275: 1995; RD-275М: 2007
- Designer: NPO Energomash, Valentin Glushko
- Manufacturer: Proton-PM
- Application: First stage booster
- Associated LV: Proton
- Successor: RD-254, RD-256, RD-275, RD-275М
- Status: Operational

Liquid-fuel engine
- Propellant: N_{2}O_{4} / UDMH
- Mixture ratio: 2.67
- Cycle: Staged combustion

Configuration
- Chamber: 1
- Nozzle ratio: 26.2

Performance
- Thrust, vacuum: RD-253: 1,630 kN (370,000 lb_{f}); RD-275: 1,750 kN (390,000 lb_{f}); RD-275М: 1,832 kN (412,000 lb_{f})
- Thrust, sea-level: RD-253: 1,470 kN (330,000 lb_{f}); RD-275: 1,590 kN (360,000 lb_{f}); RD-275М: 1,671 kN (376,000 lb_{f})
- Thrust-to-weight ratio: 156.2
- Chamber pressure: RD-253: 14.7 MPa (2,130 psi; 147 bar); RD-275: 15.7 MPa (2,280 psi; 157 bar); RD-275M: 16.5 MPa (2,390 psi; 165 bar)
- Specific impulse, vacuum: RD-253: 316s RD-275: 316s RD-275M: 315.8s
- Specific impulse, sea-level: RD-253: 285s RD-275: 287s RD-275M: 288s
- Gimbal range: 7.5°, single plane

Dimensions
- Length: 3 m (9.8 ft)
- Diameter: 1.5 m (4 ft 11 in)
- Dry mass: RD-253: 1,080 kg (2,380 lb); RD-275: 1,070 kg (2,360 lb); RD-275M: 1,070 kg (2,360 lb)

The RD-253 (Russian: Ракетный Двигатель-253, romanized: Raketnyy Dvigatel-253, lit. 'Rocket Engine 253') and its later variants, the RD-275 and RD-275M, are liquid-propellant rocket engines developed in the Soviet Union by Energomash. The engines are used on the first stage of the Proton launch vehicle and use an oxidizer-rich staged combustion cycle to power the turbopumps. The engine burns a hypergolic mixture of unsymmetrical dimethylhydrazine (UDMH) fuel with dinitrogen tetroxide (N_{2}O_{4}) oxidizer, which are highly toxic, but storable at room temperature.

== History ==
Development of the RD-253 started in 1961. Preliminary investigations and development of the engine and its further production was performed under the guidance of Valentin Glushko and finished in 1963. The RD-253 uses an oxidiser-rich staged combustion cycle. It was used for the first time in July 1965, when six engines powered the first stage of the Proton rocket. Development and production of RD-253 was a qualitative leap forward for rocketry of that time by achieving high levels of thrust, specific impulse and pressure in the combustion chamber. This engine is one of the most reliable engines in the USSR and modern Russia.

As the first stage of the Proton-K rocket used six RD-253 engines, the system played a pivotal role in Russian space missions when this rocket was chosen as a carrier, including the following programs: "Luna", "Venera", "Mars probe", crewed orbital stations "Salyut", "Mir", and it launched several principal modules for ISS. It was widely used for the launches of heavy satellites. The last RD-253 rocket engine was used on a Proton-K rocket and launched on March 30, 2012.

Since the original development of the engine, several modifications were designed that were not flown. One of them was the RD-256 engine, for which development stopped on experimental models. It was not used in flights and was designed for a cancelled vehicle. The RD-254 variant was supplied with an extended nozzle for use in vacuum.

== Current state and development ==
All rights to sell and employ the RD-253 for Proton rocket are held by Energomash which produces it in Perm, Russia.

The modification RD-275 (14D14) appeared as the result of development in 1987–1993, with the purpose to achieve a more powerful version of the engine. Its 7.7% higher thrust was reached by raising pressure in the combustion chamber and enabled an increase of payload mass to geostationary orbit (GEO) up to more than 6,000 kg (13,000 lb). The successful maiden flight of a Proton rocket with the new engine was completed in 1995.

Energomash started the development of next more powerful version of engine in 2001. It has 5.2% higher thrust and has the designation 14D14M (RD-275M). It was designed to allow the rocket to deliver 150 kg (330 lb) more payload to GEO.

In the period from 2002 to 2003 years some experimental work was completed with this version of the engine. It included four test firings of three experimental RD-275M with a total time of 735s. In the middle of 2005, this engine went into production by government commission. The first launch of a Proton-M with 14D14M engines was launched on July 7, 2007.

The final version RD-275M is sometimes designated as RD-276, but through 2009 the name RD-275M (14D14M) was more common. Some sources points out the cost of production per engine as much as 1.5 million USD and sometimes calls some lower figures around 1 million USD per unit.

== Versions ==
During the years there have been many versions of this engine:

- RD-220: Initial proposal for the N-1 first stage.
- RD-221: Initial proposal for the N-1 second stage.
- RD-222 (GRAU Index 11D41): Development program for the N-1 first stage.
- RD-223 (GRAU Index 11D42): Development program for the N-1 second stage.
- RD-253 (GRAU Index 11D43): Serial production version for the Proton (8K62) first stage. Was proposed for the N-1 first stage.
- RD-253F (GRAU Index 11D43F): Project for R-36M (15А14) first stage.
- RD-254 (GRAU Index 11D44): Project for UR-700 third stage and for Proton and N-1 second stages, it was a RD-253 high-altitude version.
- RD-275 (GRAU Index 14D14): Serial production for Proton-M first stage. RD-253 with increased thrust by 8%.
- RD-276 (GRAU Index 14D14М): Serial production for Proton-M first stage. Sometimes previously called RD-275M. Improved RD-275.

RD-253 Family of Engines
Engine	RD-220	RD-221	RD-222 (11D41)	RD-223 (11D42)	RD-253 (11D413)	RD-253F (11D413F)	RD-254 (11D44)	RD-275 (14D14)	RD-275M (RD-276, 14D14M)
Development	1960		1960-1961		1962-1966	1966-1967	1961-1963	1987-1993	2001-2005
Combustion Chamber Pressure	14.7 MPa (2,130 psi)					16.9 MPa (2,450 psi)	14.7 MPa (2,130 psi)	15.7 MPa (2,280 psi)	16.5 MPa (2,390 psi)
Thrust (Vacuum)	1,074 kN (241,000 lbf)	1,120 kN (250,000 lbf)	1,634 kN (367,000 lbf)	1,700 kN (380,000 lbf)	1,635 kN (368,000 lbf)	1,870 kN (420,000 lbf)	1,720 kN (390,000 lbf)	1,750 kN (390,000 lbf)	1,832 kN (412,000 lbf)
Thrust (Sea Level)	947 kN (213,000 lbf)	N/A	1,471 kN (331,000 lbf)	N/A	1,474 kN (331,000 lbf)	1,720 kN (390,000 lbf)	N/A	1,590 kN (360,000 lbf)	1,671 kN (376,000 lbf)
Specific Impulse (Vacuum)	306 s (3.00 km/s)	318 s (3.12 km/s)	302 s (2.96 km/s)	314 s (3.08 km/s)	316 s (3.10 km/s)	317 s (3.11 km/s)	328 s (3.22 km/s)	316 s (3.10 km/s)	315.8 s (3.097 km/s)
Specific Impulse (Sea Level)	270 s (2.6 km/s)	N/A	272 s (2.67 km/s)	N/A	285 s (2.79 km/s)	290 s (2.8 km/s)	N/A	287 s (2.81 km/s)	288 s (2.82 km/s)
Height	2,600 mm (100 in)	4,200 mm (170 in)	3,470 mm (137 in)	5,050 mm (199 in)	3,000 mm (120 in)	2,700 mm (110 in)	4,000 mm (160 in)	3,050 mm (120 in)	3,050 mm (120 in)
Diameter	1,300 mm (51 in)	2,400 mm (94 in)	1,460 mm (57 in)	2,530 mm (100 in)	1,500 mm (59 in)	1,490 mm (59 in)	2,600 mm (100 in)	1,500 mm (59 in)	1,500 mm (59 in)
Intended Use	N-1 first stage	N-1 second stage	N-1 first stage	N-1 second stage	Proton (8K62) first stage	R-36M (15А14) first stage	UR-700 third stage, Proton and N-1 second stages	Proton-M first stage	Proton-M first stage
Status	Project (Abandoned)				Retired	Project (Abandoned)		Retired	In Production

== See also ==
- Proton - uses RD-275
- Rocket engine
