= Eutelsat 5 West B =

Communications satellite

- Mission type: Communications
- Operator: Eutelsat
- COSPAR ID: 2019-067A
- SATCAT no.: 44624
- Website: www.eutelsat.com/en/satellites/eutelsat-5-west.html
- Mission duration: more than 15 years (anticipated)

Spacecraft properties
- Bus: GEOStar-2e
- Manufacturer: Northrop Grumman Innovation Systems (NGIS) for Satellite bus and Airbus Defence and Space for Payload
- Launch mass: 2,740 kilograms (6,040 lb) or 2,864 kilograms (6,314 lb)

Start of mission
- Launch date: 9 October 2019, 10:17 UTC
- Rocket: Proton/Briz-M
- Launch site: Baikonur Cosmodrome

Orbital parameters
- Reference system: Geocentric
- Regime: Geostationary

Transponders
- Band: 35 Ku
- Coverage area: Europe, North Africa

Eutelsat 5 West B is a geostationary communications satellite. It is owned by European satellite communications company Eutelsat. It launched on October 9, 2019, at 10:17 UTC on a Proton-M rocket from Baikonur Cosmodrome in Kazakhstan. The satellite was built by Northrop Grumman and Airbus Defence and Space and has an expected operational life of more than 15 years. Situated at 5° west, it broadcasts satellite television, radio and other digital data. It was scheduled to enter operational service at the end of 2019, but deployment difficulties delayed service.

== Problems ==
On 24 October 2019 Eutelsat released a statement saying the company was investigating an incident on one of the bird's two solar arrays.

On 17 January 2020 Eutelsat issued a statement saying that one of the two arrays was unusable, and the resulting power shortage meant that the satellite could operate at only 45% capacity. The satellite was expected to enter service in late January 2020. The satellite was planned to replace the Eutelsat 5 West A. However, due to the power shortage, Eutelsat 5 West A ultimately remained operational for longer than originally planned in a fuel-saving inclined orbit. This extension was one part of the mitigation activities. Eutelsat 5 West B's problems was projected to cost Eutelsat several million euros. Eutelsat had not decided (as of January 17) the size of the ensuing insurance claim.

The European GNSS Agency's GEO-3, a hosted payload of the Eutelsat West B, was not affected by the power loss and was expected to function normally. It entered service on February 14, 2020.
