= Sheldon names =

US names for Soviet Union launch vehicles

Sheldon names were used to identify launch vehicles of the Soviet Union when their Soviet names were unknown. The system was published by Dr. Charles Sheldon of the United States Library of Congress in 1968. The system emphasizes the basic families of launch vehicles with special indicators for variants within a family.

A typical Sheldon name is the F-1-m, a forerunner to the Tsyklon launch vehicle, or the F-2. The "F" indicates the launch vehicle family, the "1" indicates the upper stage, and the "m" indicates that the upper stage is manoeuvrable.

Examples of Sheldon names with Soviet names now known
Sheldon name	Soviet name	Year
A-1	Vostok rocket	1959
A-2-e	Molniya	1961
A-2	Soyuz rocket	1963
C-1	Kosmos rocket	1964
D	Proton rocket	1965
D-1-e	Proton rocket	1967
D-1	Proton rocket	1968
G-1-e	N-1 rocket	1969
F-2	Tsyklon	1977
J-1	Zenit rocket	1985
K-1	Energia	1987
