= List of Proton launches (2020–2029) =

This is a list of launches made by the Proton rocket between 2020 and 2029. All launches will be conducted from the Baikonur Cosmodrome. The Proton rocket is scheduled to make its last flight and be retired before 2030.

== Launch statistics ==
=== Rocket configurations ===
- Proton-M
- Proton-M/Briz-M
- Proton-M/Blok DM-3

=== Launch sites ===
- Baikonur Site 81/24
- Baikonur Site 200/39

=== Launch outcomes ===
- Failure
- Partial failure
- Success
- Planned

== Launch history ==
=== 2020 ===
Flight No.	Date / time (UTC)	Rocket, Configuration	Launch site	Payload	Payload mass	Orbit	Users	Launch outcome
935-67	30 July 2020; 21:25:19	Proton-M / Briz-M; 8K82KM/11S43	Site 200/39	Ekspress-80; Ekspress-103	4390 kg total 2110 kg and 2280 kg	Geosynchronous transfer	RSCC	Success
935-67	Communications satellites							
=== 2021 ===
Flight No.	Date / time (UTC)	Rocket, Configuration	Launch site	Payload	Payload mass	Orbit	Users	Launch outcome
535-45	21 July 2021; 14:58	Proton-M; 8K82KM	Site 200/39	Nauka	20200 kg	Low Earth (ISS)	Roscosmos	Success
535-45	ISS module							
535-46	13 December 2021; 12:07	Proton-M / Briz-M; 8K82KM/11S43	Site 200/39	Ekspress-AMU3; Ekspress-AMU7	4130 kg total 1980 kg and 2150 kg	Geosynchronous	RSCC	Success
535-46	Communications satellites							
=== 2022 ===
935-71	12 October 2022 15:00	Proton-M / DM-03; 8K82KM/11S861-03	Site 81/24	AngoSat-2	1964kg	Geosynchronous	GGPEN	Success
935-71	Communications satellite							
=== 2023 ===
935-70	5 February 2023 09:12:51	Proton-M / DM-03; 8K82KM/11S861-03	Site 81/24	Elektro-L №4	3000kg	Geosynchronous	Roscosmos	Success
935-70	Weather satellite							
935-73	12 March 2023 23:12:59	Proton-M / Briz-M; 8K82KM/11S43	Site 200/39	Olymp-K №2	3000kg	Geosynchronous	Roscosmos	Success
935-73	SIGINT satellite							
=== 2026 ===
935-68	12 February 2026 08:52:15	Proton-M / DM-03; 8K82KM/11S861-03	Site 81/24	Elektro-L №5	3000kg	Geosynchronous	Roscosmos	Success
935-68	Weather satellite. Final launch of Proton-M in the DM-03 configuration.							

== Planned launches ==
Date / time (UTC)	Rocket Configuration	Launch site	Payload	Payload type	Orbit	Users
2026	Proton-M / Briz-M	Baikonur	Ekvator	Communications	Geosynchronous	ISA
2026	Communications satellite built by ISS Reshetnev for Iran.					
2026	Proton-M / Briz-M	Baikonur	Ekspress-AMU4	Communications	Geosynchronous	RSCC
2026	Proton-M / Briz-M	Baikonur	Yamal-501; Luch-5VM №1	Communications	Geosynchronous	Gazprom Space Systems; Gonets Satellite System
2029	Proton-M / Briz-M	Baikonur	Ekspress-AMU6	Communications	Geosynchronous	RSCC
2029	Proton-M	Baikonur	NEM	Space station module	Low Earth (ISS)	Roscosmos
2029	Science Power Module (NEM) for the future Russian Orbital Station. Originally planned for launch on Proton-M to the ISS, before being transferred to Angara-A5 at 98.0°. In December 2025, the launch was transferred back to Proton-M to the ISS.					
