= Proton (rocket family) =

Soviet designed rocket family

Proton 8K82K
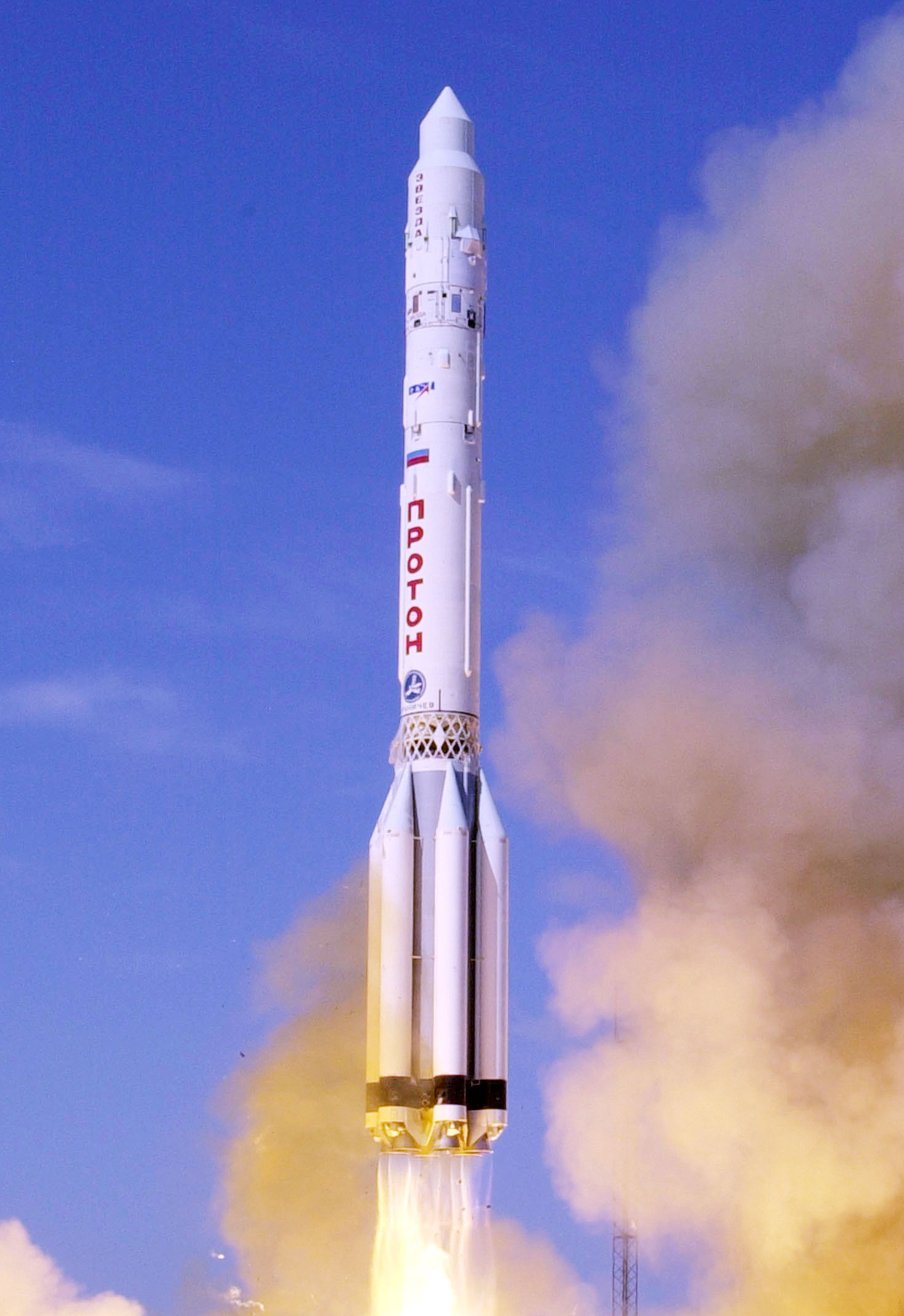
- Launch of a Proton-K rocket carrying the Zvezda module to the ISS.
- Function: Heavy-lift launch vehicle
- Manufacturer: Khrunichev State Research and Production Space Center; Chemical Automatics Design Bureau
- Country of origin: Soviet Union · Russia

Size
- Height: 53 m (174 ft)
- Diameter: 7.4 m (24 ft)
- Mass: 693,810 kg (1,529,590 lb), 3 stage
- Stages: Proton-K: 3; Proton-M: 4

Capacity

Payload to LEO
- Mass: 23,700 kg (52,200 lb)

Payload to GTO
- Mass: 6,300 kg (13,900 lb)

Launch history
- Status: Active
- Launch sites: Baikonur, LC-200 & LC-81
- Total launches: 431: Proton: 4; Proton-K: 311; Proton-M: 116
- Success(es): 383: Proton: 3; Proton-K: 275; Proton-M: 105
- Failures: 44: Proton: 1; Proton-K: 34; Proton-M: 9
- Partial failures: 4: Proton-K: 2; Proton-M: 2
- First flight: Proton: 16 July 1965; Proton-K: 10 March 1967; Proton-M: 7 April 2001
- Last flight: Proton: 6 July 1966; Proton-K: 30 March 2012; Proton-M: 12 February 2026
- Carries passengers or cargo: Salyut 6; Salyut 7; Mir (all components except Docking Module); ISS components (Zarya, Zvezda, Nauka); ViaSat-1; GLONASS; ExoMars; Spektr-RG; Eutelsat 5 West B

First stage
- Powered by: 6 × RD-275
- Maximum thrust: 10,470 kN (2,350,000 lb_{f})
- Burn time: 126 seconds
- Propellant: N_{2}O_{4}/UDMH

Second stage
- Powered by: 3 × RD-0210 & 1 × RD-0211
- Maximum thrust: 2,399 kN (539,000 lb_{f})
- Specific impulse: 327 s (3.21 km/s)
- Burn time: 208 seconds
- Propellant: N_{2}O_{4}/UDMH

Third stage
- Powered by: 1 × RD-0212
- Maximum thrust: 630 kN (140,000 lb_{f})
- Specific impulse: 325 s (3.19 km/s)
- Burn time: 238 seconds
- Propellant: N_{2}O_{4}/UDMH

Fourth stage – Blok-D/DM
- Powered by: 1 × RD-58M
- Maximum thrust: 83.4 kN (18,700 lb_{f})
- Specific impulse: 349 s (3.42 km/s)
- Burn time: 770 seconds
- Propellant: LOX/RP-1

Proton (Russian: Протон, lit. 'proton', formal designation: UR-500, GRAU: 8K82, Sheldon: D-1, DoD: SL-9/-12/-13) is a Soviet and Russian hypergolic expendable heavy-lift launch vehicle family. Developed by the Soviet space program, its first launch was in 1965. The Proton-K flew 310 missions from 1967 to 2012; the modernized Proton-M, operational since 2001, is flown by Roscosmos for commercial and state payloads, scheduled until 2029.

Components are manufactured in the Khrunichev State Research and Production Space Center, Moscow, and Chemical Automatics Design Bureau, Voronezh, then transported to the Baikonur Cosmodrome, Kazakhstan, where they are assembled at Site 91 to form the launch vehicle. Following payload integration, the rocket is then brought to the launch pad horizontally by rail and raised into vertical position for launch. As with many Soviet rockets, the names of recurring payloads became associated with the launch vehicle itself. The moniker "Proton" originates from a series of similarly named scientific satellites, which were among the rocket's first payloads.

Launch capacity to low Earth orbit is about 22.8 tonnes (50,000 lb). Geostationary transfer capacity is about 6.3 tonnes (14,000 lb). Commercial launches are marketed by International Launch Services (ILS). During the 1970s and 1980s, Proton-K launched every interplanetary probe of the Soviet space program's Venera and Mars missions, using its Blok D fourth stage. In three-stage configuration, it launched the Zond program's circumlunar flights and all seven space stations of the Salyut program. The Soviet program also considered the Proton for launching the TKS crewed spacecraft and LKS spaceplane.

From 1986, Protons launched six of the seven modules of Mir, the first modular space station, and from 1998, launched the Zarya, Zvezda, and Nauka modules of the International Space Station's Russian Orbital Segment. Protons launched the first two generations of GLONASS satellites and various commercial satellites; the Proton-M upgrade first flew in 2001 and uses the Briz family for fourth stages.

In 2013, the rocket was intended to be retired before 2030. Since 2018, Proton has been approaching retirement; Russia's Angara A5, a replacement in the heavy-lift role, conducted four test flights and one operational flight between 2014 and 2025. No new launch service contracts for Proton are likely to be signed; its latest scheduled launches are the Science Power Module 1 to the ISS and an Ekspress satellite, both in 2029.

== History ==
Proton started its life as a "super heavy ICBM". It was designed to launch a 100-megaton (or larger) thermonuclear weapon over a distance of 13,000 km. It was hugely oversized for an ICBM and was never deployed in such a capacity. It was eventually used as a space launch vehicle. It was the brainchild of Vladimir Chelomei's design bureau as a foil to Sergei Korolev's N1 rocket, whose purpose was to send a two-man Zond spacecraft around the Moon; Korolev openly opposed Proton and Chelomei's other designs for their use of toxic propellants.

The unusual appearance of the first stage results from the need to transport components by rail. The central oxidizer tank is the maximum width for the loading gauge of the track. The six tanks surrounding it carry fuel and serve as the attachment points for the engines. Despite resembling strap-on boosters, they are not designed to separate from the central oxidizer tank. The first and second stages are connected by a lattice structure. The second stage engine ignites shortly before separation of the first stage and the lattice allows the exhaust to escape. This is called "hot staging" and it eliminates the need for ullage motors on the second stage.

A rushed development program led to dozens of failures between 1965 and 1972. Proton did not complete its State Trials until 1977, at which point it was judged to have a higher than 90% reliability.

Proton's design was kept secret until 1986, with the public being only shown the upper stages in film clips and photographs, and the first time the complete vehicle was shown to the outside world happened during the televised launch of Mir.

Mass-production of the guidance, navigation and control system for Proton began in 1964 by "Communard" Industrial Association (Kharkov, Ukraine).

Proton launched the uncrewed Soviet circumlunar flights and was intended to have launched the first crewed Soviet circumlunar spaceflights, before the United States flew the Apollo 8 mission. Proton launched the Salyut space stations, the Mir core segment and expansion modules, and both the Zarya and Zvezda modules of the ISS.

Proton also launches commercial satellites, most of them being managed by International Launch Services. The first ILS Proton launch was on 9 April 1996 with the launch of the SES Astra 1F communications satellite.

Between 1994 and mid-2010, Proton revenues were $4.3 billion, and were projected to grow to $6 billion by 2011.

In January 2017, the Proton was temporarily grounded due to the manufacturer, Voronezh Mechanical Plant, having substituted a heat-resistant alloy in the engines with a cheaper metal.

In June 2018, the state corporation Roscosmos announced that the Proton rocket would cease production as the new Angara launch vehicle comes on line and becomes operational. No new launch service contracts for Proton are likely to be signed.

Proton flew its last scheduled commercial mission on 9 October 2019, delivering Eutelsat 5 West B and Mission Extension Vehicle-1 to geostationary orbit. A number of Roscosmos and other Russian government missions remain on Proton launch manifest.

== Proton K ==
Proton K is fueled by very toxic unsymmetrical dimethyl hydrazine and nitrogen tetroxide. These are hypergolic fuels which ignite on contact, avoiding the need for an ignition system, and can be stored at ambient temperatures. This avoids the need for components that are tolerant of low temperatures, and allows the rocket to remain on the pad indefinitely (other launchers with such capability include the U.S. Titan II GLV, Titan III, and Titan IV, the Chinese Long March 2 and Long March 4, the Soviet/Ukrainian Tsyklon launchers, the Soviet/Russian Kosmos-3 and Kosmos-3M launchers and the European Ariane 1 to Ariane 4 launchers). In contrast, cryogenic fuels need periodic replenishment as they boil off.

The fourth stage has multiple variants, depending on the mission. The simplest, Blok D, was used for interplanetary missions. Blok D had no guidance module, depending on the probe to control flight. Three different Blok DM versions (DM, DM2, and DM-2M) were for high Earth orbits. The Blok D/DM were unusual in that the fuel was stored in a toroidal tank, around the engine and behind the oxidizer tank.

The initial Proton tests in 1965–66 only used the first two stages of the booster, the complete four-stage vehicle being flown for the first time in 1967. When the Soviet space station program began in 1971, Protons began being flown with the Blok D removed for use as a heavy-lift LEO launcher.

Proton-K payloads included all of the Soviet Union's Salyut space stations, almost all Mir modules (with the exception of the Docking Module, which was launched on the United States Space Shuttle), and the Zarya and Zvezda modules of the International Space Station. It was intended to launch the crewed TKS spacecraft, prior to the cancellation of that programme, although a few robotic flights of spacecraft were fulfilled. In addition it was intended to launch the 1970s LKS spaceplane that was never realised.

The final launch of Proton-K was on 30 March 2012.

== Proton-M ==
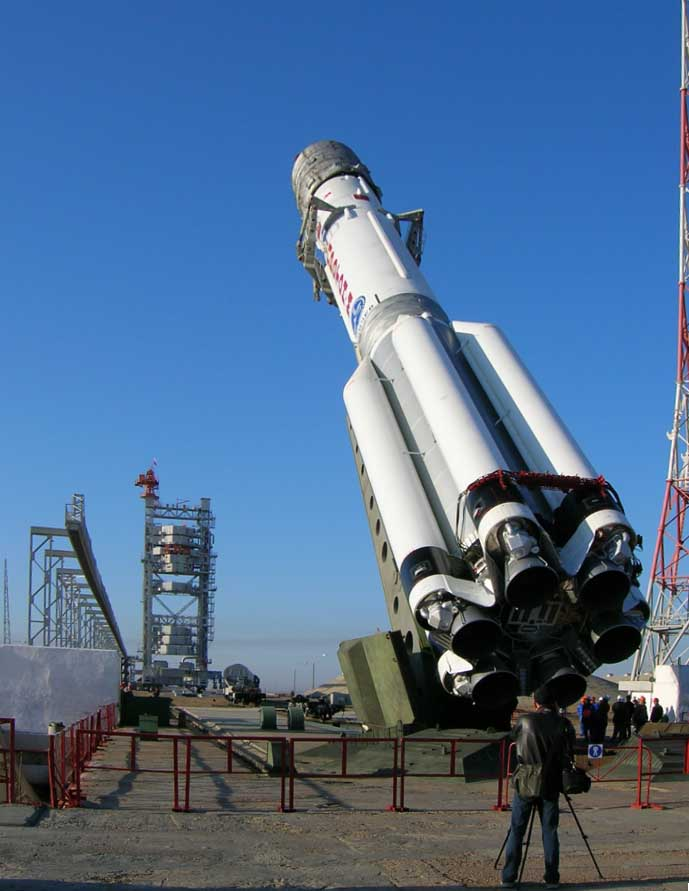
Proton-M, part being rotated to vertical. In the background, the mobile service tower can be observed.

The initial version of Proton M, could launch 3–3.2 tonnes (6,600–7,100 lb) into geostationary orbit or 5.5 tonnes (12,000 lb) into a geostationary transfer orbit. It could place up to 22 tonnes (49,000 lb) in low Earth orbit with a 51.6-degree inclination, the orbit of the International Space Station (ISS).

The Proton M's improvements included lower stage modifications to reduce structural mass, increase thrust, and fully use propellants. Generally a Briz-M (Russian: Бриз meaning Breeze) storable propellant upper stage is used instead of the Blok D or Blok DM stage, removing the need for multiple fuel supplies and oxygen top-off due to boiling; the Proton-M also flew with a Blok-DM upper stage. Efforts were also made to reduce dependency on foreign (usually Ukrainian) component suppliers. With the Briz-M upper stage, the payload fairing diameter is 4.1 m (13.45 ft).

Proton launch vehicles and Briz-M upper stages are designed and built by Khrunichev State Research and Production Space Center (Khrunichev) in Moscow, the majority owner of International Launch Services (ILS). The center is home to all engineering, assembly and test functions of Proton production. With the recent consolidation of the Russian space enterprises, Khrunichev has direct oversight and control of up to 70% of all Proton manufacturing from suppliers to manufacturers. The consolidation directly supports Khrunichev's ongoing efforts for vertical integration of Proton production.

=== Phase III ===
An enhanced variant, the Phase III Proton-M/Briz-M launch vehicle, was flight proven on the Russian Federal dual mission of Express AM-44 and Express MD-1 in February 2009 and performed its first commercial launch in March 2010 with the Echostar XIV satellite. The Proton-M/Briz-M phase III configuration provides 6150 kg of GTO performance, an increase of 1150 kg over the original Proton-M Briz-M, while maintaining the fundamental design configuration.

On 6 August 2012, the Russian Federal Space Agency lost a Russian and an Indonesian communications satellite in an attempt to launch them into orbit on a Proton-M due to technical difficulties with the last stage.

On 2 July 2013, a Proton-M launching three GLONASS navigation satellites experienced a failure reminiscent of the 1960s disasters shortly after liftoff when the booster crashed near LC-39 at Baikonour, ending a 30-year unbroken stretch without a first stage failure; all future Proton flights were suspended pending investigation. The accident was eventually determined to be caused by the rate gyro package having been installed upside-down. Due to the difficulty of installing the package incorrectly, it was widely suspected that it had been done deliberately by a disgruntled or drunk worker at the Khrunichev plant.

On 15 May 2014, a Proton-M/Briz-M carrying an Ekspress satellite suffered a third stage failure from a bad turbopump bearing. Debris fell in Manchuria. On 21 October, another Ekspress satellite was left in a useless orbit when the Briz stage cut off 24 seconds too early.

On 16 May 2015, a MEXSAT communications satellite failed to orbit due to another third stage malfunction, the eighth Proton failure since 2010.

=== Phase IV ===
Khrunichev has initiated development of a set of phase IV enhancements in order to keep pace with market demands and the mass growth trends of commercial satellites. The implementation of Phase IV Proton Briz-M enhancements were completed in 2016. The payload mass performance for phase IV has been increased to 6320 kg to a reference GTO orbit with 1500 m/s of residual delta V to GSO.

== Future developments ==
Significant upgrades were temporarily put on hold following announcement (in 1992) of the new Angara launch vehicle. The single largest upgrade was the KVRB stage. This cryogenic stage would have greatly increased capacity. The engine was developed successfully, and the stage as a whole had progressed to hardware. However, as KVRB is noticeably larger than Block D, the vehicle's aerodynamics, flight control, software, and possibly electronics would have to be reevaluated. In addition, the launch pad can supply existing Protons with common hypergolic fuels from single sources. The upper stages, in particular, are fed by common loading pipes running along the rocket. Switching to a stage with different fuels requires the addition of extra support articles; switching to cryogens requires that such support articles top off the stage periodically.

Heavy variants of Angara will be simpler and cheaper than Proton (and like the Atlas V rocket, will not use hypergolic fuels; instead, it will be a Kerolox rocket, like the Soyuz rocket). They will also be designed from the start to accept a KVTK stage and will already have a liquid oxygen supply at the pad; only a hydrogen supply will be called upon.

== See also ==
- List of Proton launches
- Comparison of orbital launchers families
- Comparison of orbital launch systems

=== Similar launch systems ===
- Delta IV Heavy – Retired expendable launch system in the Delta rocket family
- Atlas V Heavy – Expendable launch system
- Ariane 5 – European heavy-lift space launch vehicle (1996–2023)
- Long March 5 – Chinese heavy lift rocket
- Angara A5 – Russian family of space launch vehicles
- Falcon 9 – Partially-reusable medium-lift launch vehicle by SpaceX
- H-IIB – Expendable launch system
- Saturn I – American rocket used by space program
- Saturn IB – American rocket used in the Apollo program during the 1960s and 70s
- Heavy-lift launch vehicle – Launch vehicle capable of lifting over 20,000 kg into low Earth orbit
