= Universal Rocket =

Soviet rocket family

The Universal Rocket or UR family of missiles and carrier rockets is a Russian, previously Soviet rocket family. Intended to allow the same technology to be used in all Soviet rockets, the UR is produced by the Khrunichev State Research and Production Space Center. Several variants were originally planned, of which only three flew, and only two of which entered service. In addition, the cancelled UR-500 ICBM formed the basis for the Proton carrier rocket.

== UR-100 ==
The UR-100 and its variants (e.g. UR-100N) were the standard small ICBM of the Soviet Union during the Cold War. Only the UR-100N (NATO reporting designation: SS-19 Stilett) remains in active duty, with 20–30 missiles operational. The Strela and Rokot carrier rockets are based on the UR-100N. A number of UR-100Ns have been earmarked for use as launch vehicles for the Avangard maneuverable reentry vehicle.

== UR-200 ==
The UR-200 was intended to be a larger ICBM that could also be used as a carrier rocket. Nine test flights were made between 4 November 1963, and 20 October 1964, before the program was cancelled in favor of Mikhail Yangel's R-36 missile and Tsyklon carrier rocket derivative.

== UR-500 ==
The UR-500 was designed to be a very large ICBM, with the throw-weight necessary to deliver the 50-100 megaton Tsar Bomba-like warhead. Under pressure from Khrushchev, the UR-500 was reworked as a space launcher, and eventually renamed the Proton, the latest version of which is still in service as of 2026.

== UR-700 ==
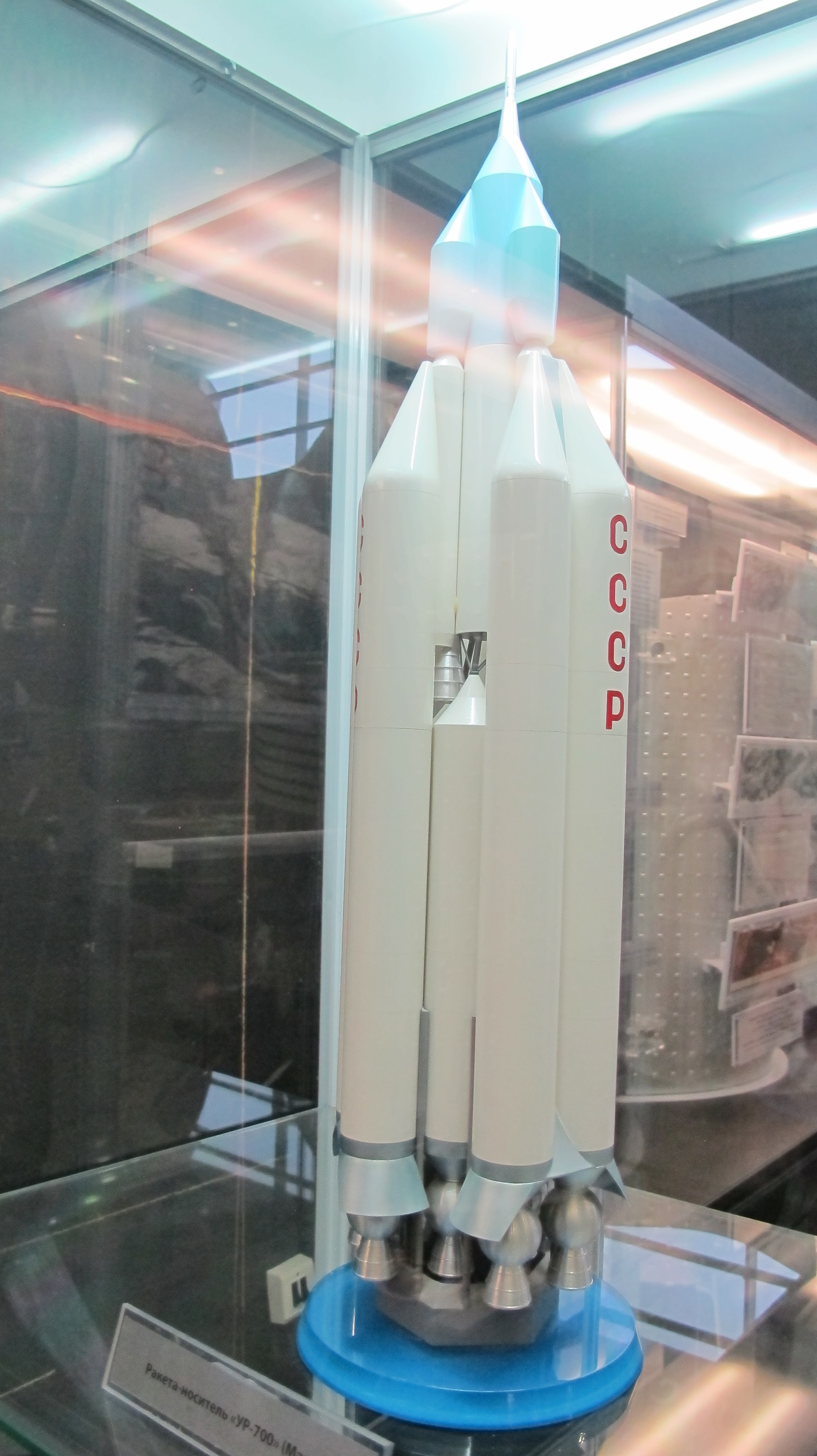
UR-700

The UR-700 was Vladimir Chelomei's heavy-lift entry for the Soviet moonshot. It was meant to carry cosmonauts to the Moon on a direct ascent mission in the LK-1 lunar craft. Sergei Korolev's N1 booster and Soyuz 7K-LOK / LK Lander were chosen instead for the mission, and it never left the drawing board. It would have had a payload capacity to low Earth orbit of 151 metric tons.

Superficially, the UR-700 was of the well-known design of Soviet launchers with a central core stack and lateral strap-on boosters. But one distinguishing feature was that the engines of the first stage were cross-fed with fuel and oxidizer from the tanks of the strap-on boosters during the initial flight phase. This meant that when the boosters were spent and jettisoned, the central stack still flew with full tanks, thus reducing dead weight and increasing a possible payload.

A nuclear variant known as the UR-700A was also designed to have an increased payload capacity of 250 t (500,000 lb) to LEO, capable of launching a lunar landing mission with up to seven crew. There was also another proposed variant named UR-700M with an even larger payload capacity of 750 t (1,500,000 lb) to LEO, making it one of the largest launch vehicles ever conceived and rivaling American designs such as the Sea Dragon. Using kerolox for the first two stages and hydrolox for the third, it would have been used to launch a crewed mission to Mars by assembling a spacecraft in LEO over two to four launches depending on the design.

== UR-900 ==
The UR-900 was the ultimate Universal Rocket application, a super heavy-lift launch vehicle for crewed expeditions to other planets, especially Mars. Proposed in 1969, it would have had 15 RD-270 modules in the first and second stages, and the third and fourth stages were based on those of the UR-500. The UR-900 would have stood 90 metres (295 ft) tall, had a liftoff thrust of 94,000 kN (21,132,000 lbf), and be able to place 240 tons into low Earth orbit. Like the UR-700, it remained a paper project only.

== See also ==
- List of space launch system designs
- Anatoliy Daron
