= LKS (spacecraft) =

Soviet spaceplane project

LKS "Light Cosmos Plane"
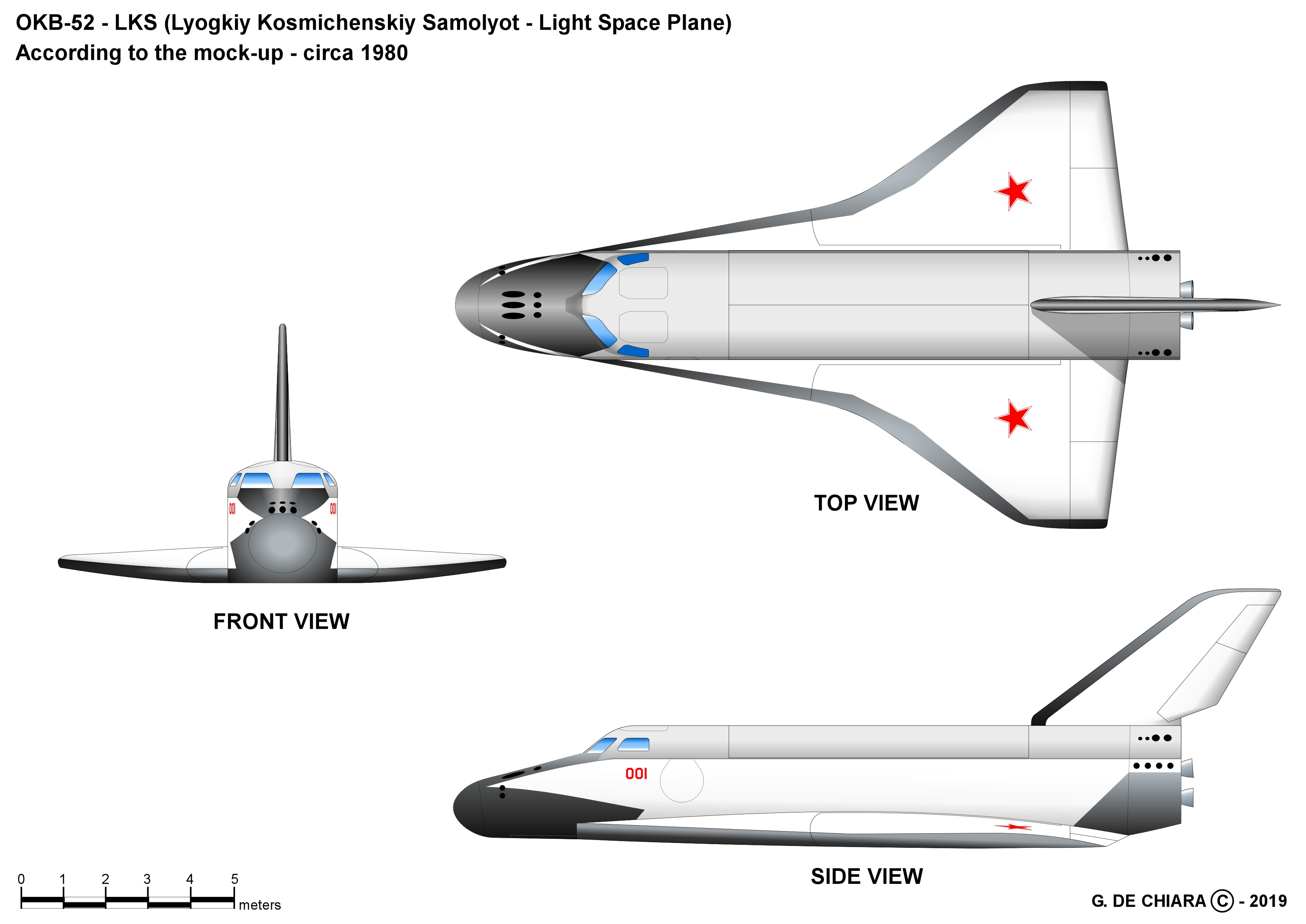
- LKS spacecraft views
- Country of origin: Soviet Union
- Applications: Crewed spaceplane

Specifications
- Launch mass: 19.950 kg
- Regime: Low Earth
- Design life: 1979 to 1982

Production
- Status: Cancelled (1982)
- Launched: 0

The LKS (Russian: Лёгкий Космический Самолёт, "Light Cosmos Plane") was a Soviet Union spaceplane project led by Vladimir Chelomey in response to the United States Space Shuttle. The LKS was smaller and cheaper than its American counterpart, but was ultimately discarded in favor of the larger Buran. Claiming that the Buran project was too big, heavy, and expensive for Russia to complete, Chelomey designed the LKS in 1979. He ordered the construction of a full-scale mock-up, as a way to further stimulate interest. The project was never fully sanctioned however, and in 1982, Chelomey was officially ordered by the Soviet government to stop any further development. In March 1983, Chelomey made yet another attempt to obtain permission to build the LKS to repel US Intercontinental ballistic missiles. This too proved futile. In 1991 the mock-up was destroyed, possibly by sabotage.

== History ==
From 1950 to 1964, before the US Space Shuttle in 1972, Chelomey developed two concepts for a spacecraft that would launch vertically and land horizontally. The MP-1 Kosmoplan was planned to complete missions to the Moon, Mars, and Venus. Upon re-entry into the Earth's atmosphere, it would land with the support of the turbocharged engines similar to a conventional airplane. The other concept, called Raketoplan or "rocket plane", was a space shuttle intended to orbit the Earth and transport passengers, space freight, and weapons. Both concepts were never implemented due to the dis-empowerment of Nikita Khrushchev.

In 1976, the Soviet government formally authorized the "head-designer" Valentin Glushko to proceed with the Buran project, which was intended to simply copy the Space Shuttle. The Buran project and its massive launch vehicle Energia were the targets of several critics among Russian space designers and scientists. One of them was Vladimir Chelomey, Glushko's former ally, who was responsible for the famous OKB-52 NPO Mashinostroyeniya (from which came the Proton rocket, the TKS spacecraft, and the Almaz and Salyut space stations).

In 1979, Chelomey affirmed that the Buran project was too big, heavy, and expensive for Russia to complete, and designed the LKS, another space shuttle concept, as an alternative to the Buran or Energia. The first concept had two V-type vertical stabilizers, similar to the F/A-18 vertical stabilizer arrangement. This was later changed to the conventional arrangement of a rudder, similar to the Space Shuttle and Buran.

In 1980, within a month of work, Chelomey ordered the construction of a full-scale mock-up by his team, as a way to further stimulate Soviet authorities in his direction.

In 1982, Chelomey was officially ordered by the Soviet government to stop any further development of the LKS project. By this point, he was believed to have expended more than 400,000 rubles in a program not formally authorized by the Soviets. When US President Ronald Reagan announced the Strategic Defense Initiative (SDI) in March 1983, Chelomey made yet another attempt to obtain permission to build the LKS to repel US Intercontinental ballistic missiles. However, in September 1983, he was rejected by a government commission. Chelomey died in December 1984, leaving behind his most ambitious project. In 1991 the mock-up was destroyed in a so-called “act of sabotage” by unknown people for unknown reasons. It is believed that if the LKS project was to be approved and completed, it would've been a valid alternative not only to Buran but also to Soyuz itself for Mir and ISS space operations. A scale model of the LKS space shuttle is now located in the Cosmonaut Museum at Gelendzhik.

== Technical specifications ==
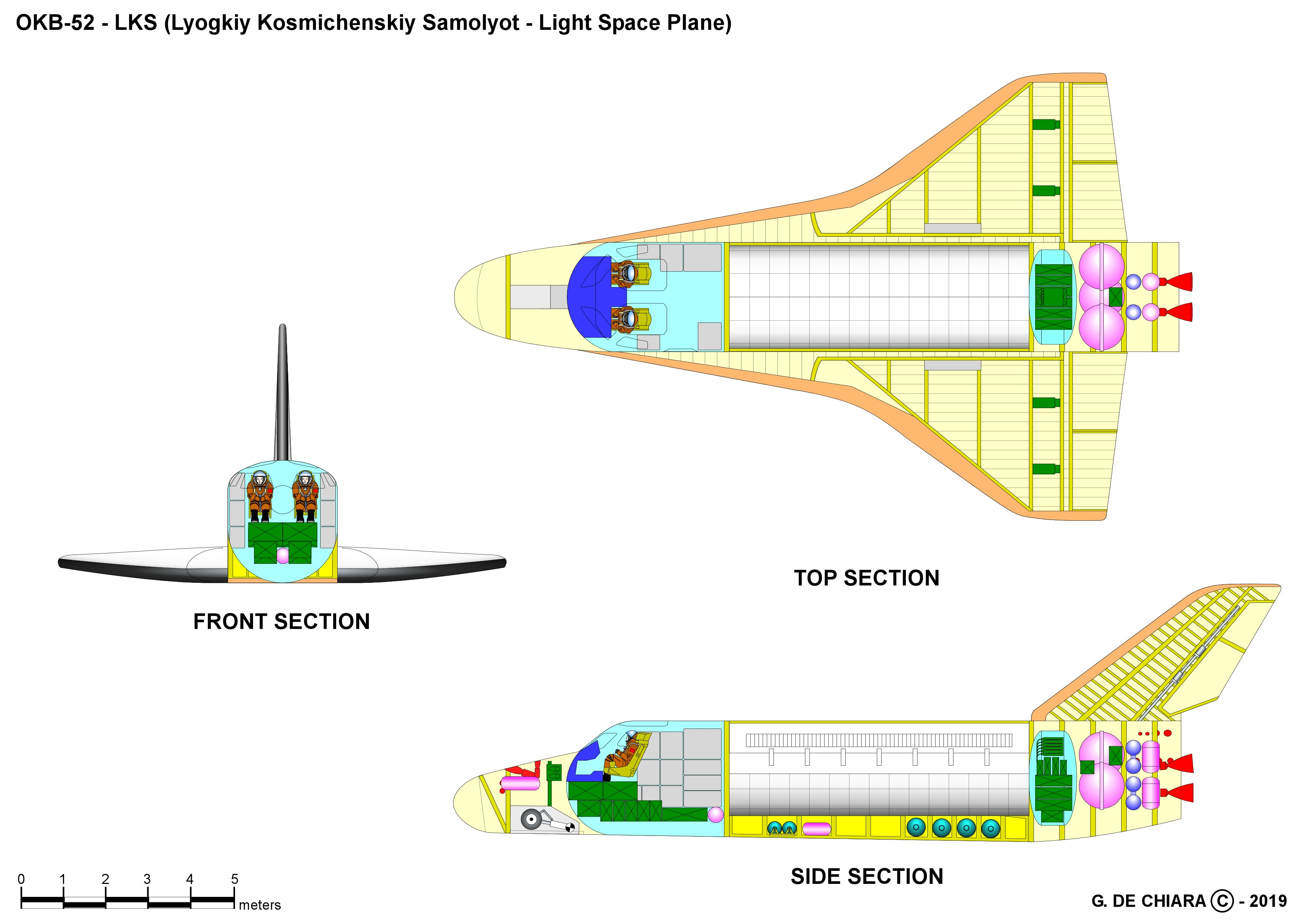

- Crew: 2
- Length: 18,75 m
- Wing Span: 11,60 m
- Height: 6,70 m
- Habitable volume: 16.00 m3
- Cargo bay volume: 30.00 m3 (6,5 x 2,5 m)
- Launch mass: 19.950 kg
- Landing mass: 17.800 kg
- Empty mass: 13.800 kg
- Payload: 4.000 kg
- Engines: 11D442 (2) x 445 kgf
- Propellants: UDMH/N_{2}O_{4} x 2.000 kg
- Power System: Batteries/Fuel Cells
- Escape System: Ejection seats (NPP Zvezda K-36D)
- Performances:
- Delta-v: 300 m/sec (total)
- Orbital parameters: 259 x 220 km @ 51,65°
- L/D Ratio: 1,5 (Hypersonic)
- Cross-range: ± 2.000 km
- Landing speed: 300 km/h

== Mission Steps ==
- Start
  - 1. Launch by a Proton rocket (T = 00:00)
  - 2. First Stage Separation (T = 02:06)
  - 3. Second Stage Separation (T = 05:34)
  - 4. Third Stage Separation (T = 09:49)
  - 5. LKS OMS Ignition (T = 10:00)
  - 6. LKS in LEO (T = 13:20)
- Orbit
  - 1. LKS gain the correct asset for burn
  - 2. LKS OMS ignition & de-orbit burn
  - 3. Braking maneuverings
  - 4. LKS re-entry into atmosphere
- Landing
  - 1. LKS is back into the atmosphere
  - 2. Braking maneuvering
  - 3. LKS gain the landing alley
  - 4. LKS assume a steep descent angle
  - 5. LKS turns to Baikonur Cosmodrome runaway
  - 6. LKS lands and open the brake chute

== See also ==
- Boeing X-20 Dyna-Soar
- Space Shuttle
- Hermes (spacecraft)
- Saenger (spacecraft)
- Hope-X
- Kliper
- Hopper (spacecraft)
- SpaceShipOne
- HOTOL
- Sharp Edge Flight Experiment
- Dream Chaser

== Bibliography ==
- Hendrickx, Bart; Vis, Bert (2007). Energiya-Buran: The Soviet Space Shuttle. Springer-Praxis. doi:10.1007/978-0-387-73984-7. ISBN 978-0-387-69848-9.
