= Ekspress-MD1 =

Russian communications satellite

- Names: Экспресс-МД1; Express-MD1
- Mission type: Communications
- Operator: Russian Satellite Communications Company (RSCC)
- COSPAR ID: 2009-007B
- SATCAT no.: 33596
- Website: https://eng.rscc.ru/
- Mission duration: 10 years (planned); 4.3 years (achieved)

Spacecraft properties
- Spacecraft: Ekspress-MD1
- Spacecraft type: Ekspress-MD
- Bus: Yakhta modified
- Manufacturer: Khrunichev (bus); Alcatel Alenia Space (payload)
- Launch mass: 1,140 kg (2,510 lb)
- Power: 1300 watts

Start of mission
- Launch date: 11 February 2009, 00:03:00 UTC
- Rocket: Proton-M / Briz-M
- Launch site: Baikonur, Site 200/39
- Contractor: Khrunichev State Research and Production Space Center
- Entered service: 12 May 2009

End of mission
- Disposal: Failed on orbit
- Last contact: 4 July 2013

Orbital parameters
- Reference system: Geocentric orbit
- Regime: Geostationary orbit
- Longitude: 80° East

Transponders
- Band: 8 × 40 Mhz C-band; 1 × 1 MHz L-band
- Bandwidth: 321 MHz
- Coverage area: Russia, CIS

Ekspress-MD1 (Russian: Экспресс-МД1), was a Russian geostationary communications satellite operated by Russian Satellite Communications Company (RSCC) and designed and manufactured by Khrunichev State Research and Production Space Center on the Yakhta satellite bus for RSCC's Ekspress series. It massed 1,140 kg (2,510 lb) at launch, had a power production capacity of 1300 watts with a C-band and L-band payload.

It was successfully launched along Ekspress-AM4 aboard a Proton-M / Briz-M from Baikonur on 11 February 2009. It was commissioned in the 80° East orbital position. The satellite failed on 4 July 2013, well short of its design life, for which RSCC collected the insurance.

== Satellite description ==
Ekspress-MD1 was a geostationary communications satellite developed by Khrunichev State Research and Production Space Center on the Yakhta satellite bus. It is a small, three axis stabilized, satellite bus designed for direct geostationary orbit and as such it lacked an apogee kick motor. It was designed to support a bigger, heavier satellite on top of it and serve as its rocket adapter. For its companion, Ekspress-AM4, it was specially reinforced to carry the 2,560 kg (5,640 lb) on top.

The satellite weighted 1,140 kg (2,510 lb) at launch, had a power production capacity of 1300 watts with a design life of 10 years. Its payload was made by Thales Alenia Space and was composed of 8 × 40 MHz C-band and 1 × 1 MHz L-band transponders, for a total satellite bandwidth of 321 MHz for mass of 225 kg (496 lb). It was designed to provide mobile presidential and governmental communications, digital TV and Radio broadcasting services, Internet access, data transfer, video conferencing in Russia and CIS countries from the 80° East orbital position.

Ekspress-MD1 was heavily based on the KazSat-1. While smaller than the other satellites of the Ekspress constellation, it enabled RSCC to have a second local supplier after its traditional contractor ISS Reshetnev. The structure was designed around a cylindrical structure that enabled stacking of another satellite on top of the Ekspress-MD1 and acted as an adaptor to the Briz-M stage for both spacecraft.

While successfully commissioned, it failed to reach even half of its design life. It had a twin satellite, Ekspress-MD2 which failed to reach orbit. As of 2016, RSCC has not ordered any further satellite from Khrunichev, relying instead on foreign suppliers like Airbus Defence and Space.

== History ==
Within the Russian Federal Space Program for 2006–2015, Russian Satellite Communications Company (RSCC) awarded on 2006 a contract for two satellites, Ekspress-MD1 and Ekspress-MD2 to Khrunichev State Research and Production Space Center. It also signed a separate contract with Alcatel Alenia Space for the supply of the payloads. The twin spacecraft would be based on the Yakhta satellite bus and the lessons from the KazSat-1 satellite.

In April 2007, RSCC Acting Director General Yuri Izmailov stated that Ekspress-MD1 and Ekspress-AM4 were the company to priority and would launch by December 2007. In an 29 April 2008 interview, Mr Izmailov stated that the Ekspress-MD1 was expected to fly in 2008.

On 10 September 2008, Khrunichev stated that the satellite production was in full swing. The solutions from the lessons learned from the anomalies of KazSat-1 and Monitor-E had been implemented. And the satellite had gone through electrical testing and was going into acceptance testing.

On 26 January 2009, the assembly of the integration of the spacecraft with Ekspress-AM4 and the Briz-M stage was started at the Baikonur launch site. On 6 February 2009, the Proton-M/Briz-M stack was certified for roll out to the Site 200/39 launch pad. On 11 February 2009, at 00:03:00 UTC, the rocket successfully launched both spacecraft directly to geostationary orbit. On 12 May 2009, Ekspress-MD1 was successfully commissioned into service in the Ekspress constellation. On the same year, the satellite was used for the first distribution of the multiplex programs compulsory under the Federal Target Program Development of TV and Radio broadcasting in the Russian Federation for 2009–2015.

On 4 July 2013, Ekspress-MD1 failed on orbit. At just 4 years, 4 months, 23 days, it failed to achieve even half of its design life. In February 2014, RSCC was able to collect the 857 million rubles insurance payment on the failed satellite.
