= Ekspress-AM7 =

Russian communications satellite

- Names: Экспресс-АМ7; Express-AM7
- Mission type: Communications
- Operator: RSCC
- COSPAR ID: 2015-012A
- SATCAT no.: 40505
- Website: eng.rscc.ru
- Mission duration: 15 years (planned); 11 years, 7 months and 19 days (in progress)

Spacecraft properties
- Spacecraft: Ekspress-AM7
- Spacecraft type: Ekspress
- Bus: Eurostar-3000
- Manufacturer: EADS Astrium
- Launch mass: 5,720 kg (12,610 lb)
- Dry mass: 1,439 kg (3,172 lb)
- Power: 18 kW

Start of mission
- Launch date: 18 March 2015, 22:05:00 UTC
- Rocket: Proton-M / Briz-M
- Launch site: Baikonur, Site 200/39
- Contractor: Khrunichev State Research and Production Space Center
- Entered service: April 2015

Orbital parameters
- Reference system: Geocentric orbit
- Regime: Geostationary orbit
- Longitude: 40° East (2015–present)

Transponders
- Band: 62 transponders: 24 C-band; 36 Ku-band; 2 L-band
- Coverage area: Russia, CIS

Ekspress-AM7 (Russian: Экспресс-АМ7 meaning Express-AM7) is a Russian communications satellite operated by the Russian Satellite Communications Company (RSCC).

== Satellite description ==
EADS Astrium, was contracted in March 2012, which had become part of Airbus Defence and Space by the time of the satellite's launch, constructed Ekspress-AM7, which was based on the Eurostar-3000 satellite bus. The satellite has a mass of 5,720 kg (12,610 lb), provides 18 kilowatts to its payload, and a planned operational lifespan of 15 years. The satellite carried 62 transponders: 24 operating in the C-band of the electromagnetic spectrum, 36 in the Ku-band and 2 in the L-band. It is a replacement for Ekspress-AM1.

== Launch ==
Khrunichev was contracted to launch Ekspress-AM7, using a Proton-M / Briz-M launch vehicle - the same configuration that had failed to deploy the similar Ekspress-AM4 and Ekspress-AM4R. The launch took place from Site 200/39 at the Baikonur Cosmodrome, at 22:05:00 UTC on 18 March 2015. The satellite was deployed into the planned geostationary transfer orbit (GTO).

== See also ==
- Ekspress
