= RD-58 =

Rocket engine

RD-58M
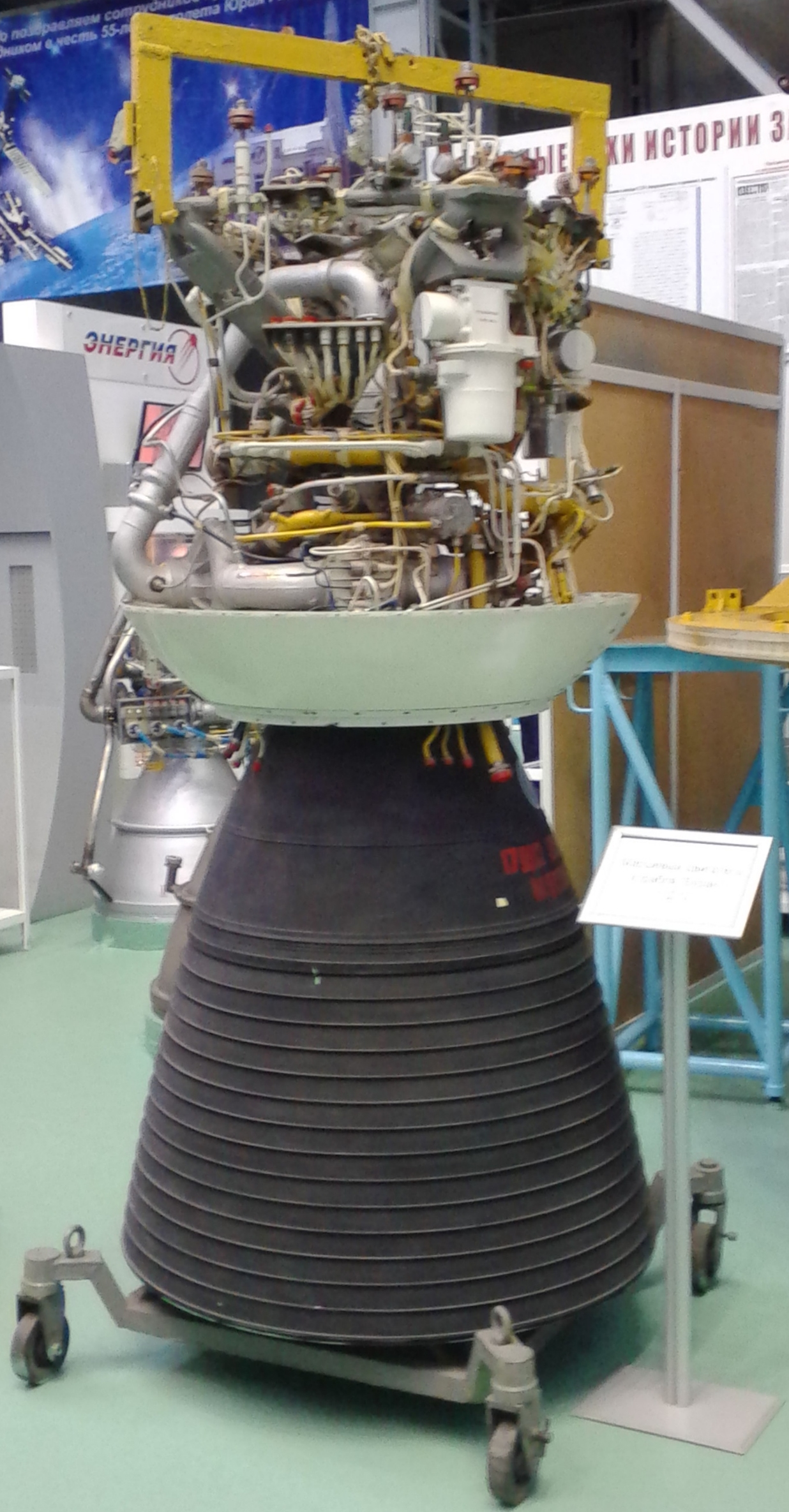
- Country of origin: Soviet Union
- First flight: 1967
- Designer: OKB-1, V. M. Melnikov
- Manufacturer: Voronezh Mechanical Plant
- Application: Upper Stage
- Associated LV: N1, Proton-K, Proton-M, Zenit
- Predecessor: S1.5400
- Status: In Production

Liquid-fuel engine
- Propellant: LOX / RG-1
- Cycle: Oxidizer-rich staged combustion

Configuration
- Chamber: 1

Performance
- Thrust, vacuum: 79.46 kilonewtons (17,860 lbf)
- Specific impulse, vacuum: 353 s
- Burn time: up to 600 s

Dimensions
- Dry mass: 300 kilograms (660 lb)

Used in
- Block D

The RD-58 (Russian: Ракетный Двигатель-58, romanized: Raketnyy Dvigatel-58, lit. 'Rocket Engine 58', GRAU index: 11D58) is a rocket engine, developed in the 1960s by OKB-1, now RKK Energia. The project was managed by Mikhail Melnikov, and it was based on the previous S1.5400 engine, which was the first staged combustion engine in the world. The engine was initially created to power the Blok D stage of the Soviet Union's abortive N1 rocket. Derivatives of this stage are now used as upper stages on some Proton and Zenit rockets. An alternative version of the RD-58 chamber, featuring a shorter nozzle, was used as the N1's roll-control engine.

The RD-58 uses liquid oxygen as the oxidizer and RG-1 as fuel in an oxidizer-rich staged combustion cycle. It features a single gimbaled chamber, radial centrifugal pumps with auxiliary booster pumps, and an oxygen-rich preburner. Recent modifications include a lightweight carbon-composite nozzle extender developed by NPO Iskra.

The Buran spacecraft used two of an evolution of the RD-58M, called 17D12, as its main orbital correction engines. Instead of RG-1, it burned Syntin, and could be ignited 15 times. It is assumed that it was the base for the RD-58S, which had practically the same specifications and powered the Blok DM-2M. But the manufacturer states that the engine is compatible with both propellants.

The current version of the engine is the RD-58M (manufacturer designation 11D58M), which has slightly reduced thrust, but increased isp. An even newer version is under development and is known as the RD-58MF (manufacturer designation 11D58MF). It will reduce thrust to 49.03 kilonewtons (11,020 lbf) to keep the same length but increase expansion ratio to 500:1. This will enable it to gain 20s of isp (to an expected 372s). It will eventually fly on the Blok DM-03. This new version of the engine will be built in the Krasnoyarsk Machine-Building Plant. During a November 2014 interview, Vladimir Kolmykov, the Deputy General Director of the Chemical Division of Krasnoyarsk Machine-Building Plant, stated that the production of Block-DM was suspended during that year, but work on the stage and development of the RD-58MF will resume during 2015.

== Versions ==
This engine has had many versions through the years:

- RD-58 (GRAU Index 11D58): Original version developed for the Blok D of the N1 (rocket).
- RD-58M (GRAU Index 11D58M): Improved version developed for the Proton Blok D.
- RD-58M (Carbon-carbon nozzle): Version of the RD-58M that replaces the regeneratively cooled nozzle for a carbon-carbon extension manufactured by NPO Iskra. Used on Zenit-3SL's Blok DM-SL since June 10, 2003 on the Thuraya 2 launch.
- RD-58MF (GRAU Index 11D58MF): Reduced thrust and increased specific impulse version expected to fly on the Proton and Zenit Blok DM-03. Will probably also use a carbon-carbon nozzle extension.
- RD-58S (GRAU Index 11D58S): Version designed to use Syntin synthetic propellant rather than RG-1. Used on the Blok DM-2M. Probably developed based on the 17D12.
- RD-58Z (GRAU Index 11D58Z): Version adapted to the Zenit Blok DM-SL.
- 17D12: Orbital maneuvering engines (DOM) of the Buran propulsion system 17D11, burned Syntin/LOX.

RD-58 Family of Engines
Name	RD-58	RD-58M	RD-58M (Carbon Composite Nozzle)	RD-58S	RD-58Z	RD-58MF	17D12
Index	11D58	11D58M		11D58S	11D58Z	11D58MF	
Development years	1964–1968	1970–1974	2000–2004	1986–1995	1981–1990	2002–2009	1981–1987
Engine Type	Oxidizer-rich stage combustion upper stage liquid rocket engine						Orbital correction liquid rocket engine
Propellant	RG-1/LOX	RG-1/LOX	RG-1/LOX	Syntin/LOX	RG-1/LOX	RG-1/LOX	Syntin/LOX
O/F	2.48	2.48	2.82	?	2.6	2.82	?
Chamber Pressure	7.8 MPa (1,130 psi)	7.75 MPa (1,124 psi)	7.9 MPa (1,150 psi)	7.94 MPa (1,152 psi)	7.8 MPa (1,130 psi)	7.9 MPa (1,150 psi)	7.94 MPa (1,152 psi)
Thrust (Vac)	83.4 kN (18,700 lbf)	83.4 kN (18,700 lbf)	85 kN (19,000 lbf)	86.3 kN (19,400 lbf)	71 kN (16,000 lbf)	49.03 kN (11,020 lbf)	86.24 kN (19,390 lbf)
Isp (Vac)	349 s (3.42 km/s)	356 s (3.49 km/s)	361 s (3.54 km/s)	361 s (3.54 km/s)	361 s (3.54 km/s)	372 s (3.65 km/s)	362 s (3.55 km/s)
Nozzle Expansion	189	189	280	189	189	500	189
Ignitions	4	4	7	5	5	?	15
Burntime	600 seconds	720 seconds	1200 seconds	680 seconds	660 seconds	? seconds	680 seconds
Length	2.27 m (89 in)	2.27 m (89 in)	2.72 m (107 in)	2.27 m (89 in)	2.27 m (89 in)		2.27 m (89 in)
Diameter	1.17 m (46 in)	1.17 m (46 in)	1.4 m (55 in)	1.17 m (46 in)	1.17 m (46 in)		1.17 m (46 in)
Weight	300 kg (660 lb)	310 kg (680 lb)	340 kg (750 lb)	310 kg (680 lb)	300 kg (660 lb)		230 kg (510 lb)
Used on	N-1 and Blok D	Blok DM	Blok DM-SL since 2003 and Blok DM-SLB	Blok DM-2M	Blok DM-SL	11S861-03	Buran
First Launch	1967-03-10	1974-03-26	2003-06-10	1994-10-13	1999-03-28	?	1988-11-15
Status	Retired	Retired	In Production	Retired	Retired	In Production	Retired
References							
