= Ekspress-A2 =

Russian communications satellite

- Names: Экспресс-A2; Express-A2; Ekspress-6A No 2 Ekspress-A No. 2
- Mission type: Communications
- Operator: Russian Satellite Communications Company (RSCC)
- COSPAR ID: 2000-013A
- SATCAT no.: 26098
- Website: eng.rscc.ru
- Mission duration: 7 years (planned); 15 years (achieved)

Spacecraft properties
- Spacecraft: Ekspress-A2
- Spacecraft type: KAUR
- Bus: MSS-2500-GSO
- Manufacturer: NPO PM (bus); Alcatel Space (payload)
- Launch mass: 2,600 kg (5,700 lb)
- Power: 2540 watts

Start of mission
- Launch date: 12 March 2000, 04:07:00 UTC
- Rocket: Proton-K / Blok DM-2M
- Launch site: Baikonur, Site 200/39
- Contractor: Khrunichev State Research and Production Space Center
- Entered service: May 2000

End of mission
- Disposal: Graveyard orbit
- Deactivated: October 2015

Orbital parameters
- Reference system: Geocentric orbit
- Regime: Geostationary orbit
- Longitude: 80° East (2000–2005); 103° East (2005–2014); 145° East (2014–2015)

Transponders
- Band: 17 transponders: 12 C-band; 5 Ku-band
- Coverage area: Russia

Ekspress-A2 (Russian: Экспресс-A2 meaning Express-A2), also designated Ekspress-6A No 2 and sometimes erroneously called Ekspress-2A, is a Russian communications satellite which is operated by Russian Satellite Communications Company (RSCC). It was constructed by NPO PM and Alcatel Space and is based on the MSS-2500-GSO satellite bus.

== Satellite ==
The launch was contracted by Khrunichev State Research and Production Space Center, and used a Proton-K / Blok DM-2M launch vehicle flying from Site 200/39 at the Baikonur Cosmodrome.

== Launch ==
Ekspress-2A is a Russian geosynchronous communications spacecraft that was launched on 12 March 2000 from Baikonur by a Proton-K launch vehicle at 04:07:00 UTC. USSPACECOM had tentatively named it Express-6A. The 2,600 kg (5,700 lb) spacecraft carries 12 transponders in C-band and five in Ku-band to provide voice, data, and video communications in Russia from the parked longitude of 80° east, supplementing the existing fleet of seven Gorizont, two Ekspress and an EKRAN-M. Ekspress are scheduled to replace the aging Gorizont fleet.

== Mission ==
It is part of the Ekspress network of satellites. Following its launch and on-orbit testing, it was placed in geostationary orbit at 103° East, from where it provides communications services to Russia. It is equipped with seventeen transponders. In October 2015, the satellite was retired and moved to a graveyard orbit above the geostationary orbit.
