= Telkom-3 =

Indonesian communications satellite

- Mission type: Communications
- Operator: PT Telkom
- COSPAR ID: 2012-044A
- SATCAT no.: 38744
- Mission duration: 15 years (planned); Failed on orbit (achieved)

Spacecraft properties
- Spacecraft: Telkom-3
- Spacecraft type: Ekspress
- Bus: Ekspress-1000H
- Manufacturer: ISS Reshetnev (bus); Alcatel Space (payload)
- Launch mass: 1,903 kg (4,195 lb)
- Power: 7.6 kW

Start of mission
- Launch date: 6 August 2012, 19:31:00 UTC
- Rocket: Proton-M / Briz-M
- Launch site: Baikonur, Site 81/24
- Contractor: Khrunichev State Research and Production Space Center
- Entered service: Failed on orbit

End of mission
- Disposal: Decayed
- Decay date: 5 February 2021

Orbital parameters
- Reference system: Geocentric orbit
- Regime: Geostationary orbit (planned); Medium Earth orbit (achieved)
- Longitude: 118° East (planned)
- Perigee altitude: 266 km
- Apogee altitude: 5015 km
- Inclination: 49.9°
- Period: 100.0 minutes

Transponders
- Band: 48 transponders: 32 C-band; 16 Ku-band
- Coverage area: Indonesia

Telkom-3 is an Indonesian communications satellite which failed to reach its target orbit due to a launch failure on 6 August 2012. It was built by ISS Reshetnev for Indonesian telecommunications provider PT Telekomunikasi Indonesia. It was based on the Ekspress-1000H bus and had 32 C band transponders and 16 Ku-band transponders. It was due to be located in geosynchronous orbit at 118° East above the equator. The satellite reentered the atmosphere and was destroyed on 5 February 2021.

== Launch ==
Telkom-3 was launched along with Ekspress-MD2 by a Proton-M rocket with Briz-M upper stage on 6 August 2012 at 19:31:00 UTC. The satellites were launched from Site 81/24 at Baikonur Cosmodrome in Kazakhstan. The first three stages of the Proton launched worked as expected and the satellites were attached to the Briz-M upper stage which would transfer them into geosynchronous orbit. The Briz-M undertakes a series of four burns with coasting stages to do this. The third burn was due to be 18 minutes long but the engines cut out after 7 seconds, leaving the satellites in an unusable orbit. of 266 x 5015 km x 49.9°. Telkom-3 manufacturer ISS Reshetnev announced that the satellite was under control with its solar panels extended but would not be able to be used for its intended purpose as it was in the wrong orbit.

=== Investigation ===
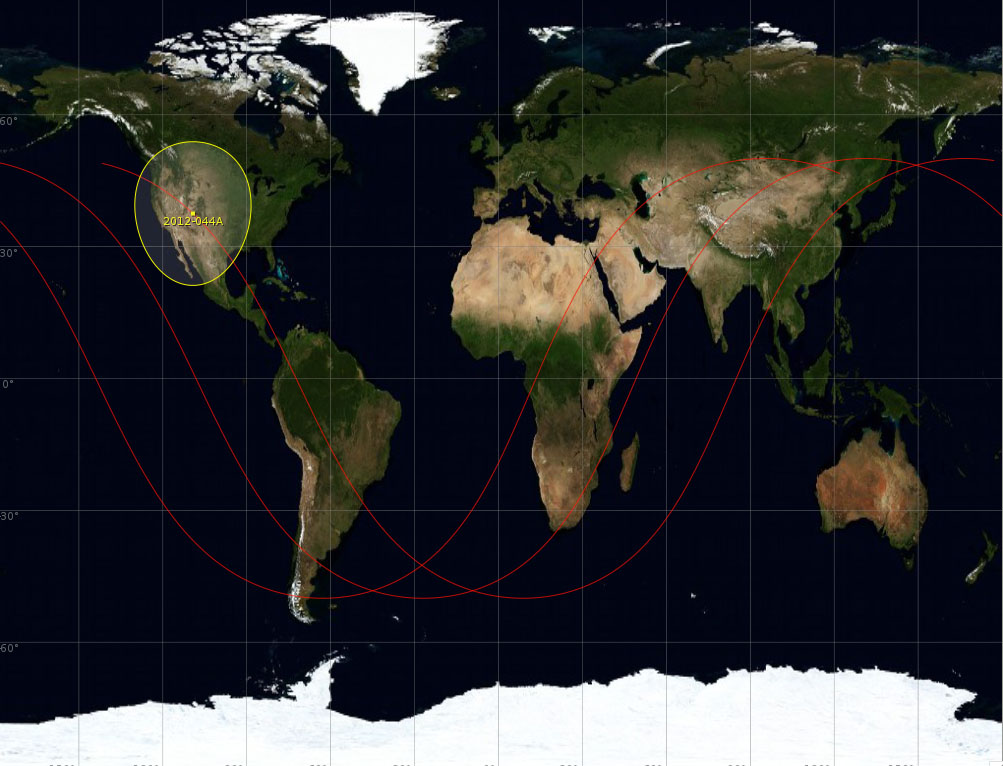
Ground track of Telkom-3

This was the second launch failure caused by a Briz-M within twelve months as Ekspress-AM4 was lost in August 2011 due to a computer error. Other recent launch failures included three GLONASS satellites in 2011 and Mars probe Fobos-Grunt. All Proton-M launches were suspended and all Briz-M stages were recalled. This triggered discussion on the crisis in the Russian space industry with Russian Prime Minister Dmitry Medvedev quoted as saying "We are losing authority and billions of rubles" due to the frequent launch failures. Medvedev chaired a meeting on the issue on 14 August 2012 and President Vladimir Putin had a meeting on organisational issues. One of the suggestions is that Roscosmos could be transformed into a corporation similar to Rosatom.

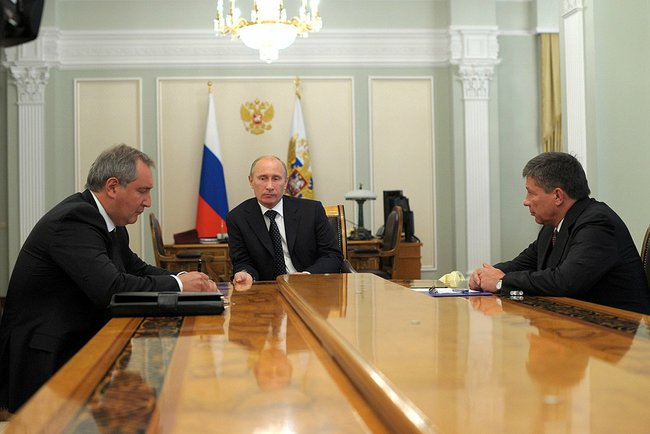
Russian president Vladimir Putin with Roscosmos head Vladimir Popovkin (right) and Dmitry Rogozin (left) in a meeting on problems in the space industry, August 2012.

An investigation was set up by Roscosmos head Vladimir Popovkin and was headed by O.P. Skorobogatov from TsNIIMash. It was reported in early August 2012 by Russian newspaper Kommersant that the failure was caused by a fault in the fuel pipe in the Briz-M. The Khrunichev Failure Review Oversight Board found that it was caused by a faulty component in the pressurisation system. On 16 October 2012, the Briz-M exploded into eighty pieces.

The director general of Khrunichev, Vladimir Nesterov, was dismissed from his post by President Vladimir Putin. The Proton-M returned to flight on 14 October 2012, carrying Intelsat 23. It had been postponed from August 2012 due to the launch failure.

== Telkom-3S ==
The replacement satellite, named Telkom-3S, was contract awarded to its satellite competitor, Thales Alenia Space on 28 July 2014. Telkom-3S was launched from the Centre Spatial Guyanais on 14 February 2017 and commissioned into service on 17 April 2017.

=== Return and reentry ===
In early 2021, concerns arose about the imminent reentry of Telkom-3 to the Atmosphere of Earth after over eight years in orbit. The National Institute of Aeronautics and Space (LAPAN) reported that they started an intensive study of the reentry since mid-January 2021. By 1 January 2021, the satellite's orbit had decayed to 217 x 555 km x 49.9°. The orbital inclination of 49.9° meant that it could reenter anywhere between latitude 49.9° North and 49.9° South, and it was calculated to have a 1:140000 casualty risk. The satellite's orbit was tracked by U.S. radars throughout its time in orbit, and Space-Track reported that it reentered between 09:26 and 09:42 UTC on 5 February 2021, somewhere on an arc from Kazakhstan through southern Mongolia and northern China. The Indonesian government reported that although Telkom-3 had returned to Earth's surface, the exact location was unknown and there were no reports of debris being found.
