= Ekspress =

Series of Russian communications satellites

Ekspress (Russian: Экспресс meaning Express), is a series of geostationary communications satellites owned by Russian Satellite Communications Company (RSCC). The first satellite of this kind was launched on 13 October 1994. The satellites are produced by the company Information Satellite Systems Reshetnev (ISS Reshetnev).

== Overview ==
The Ekspress series of communication satellites (industry code 11F639) was developed by the satellite company NPO PM as a replacement for the old Gorizont series of comsats. The first satellite of the series, Ekspress 1, was launched in 1994. It had a mass of 2500 kg, 17 channels and an operational lifetime of at 5–7 years.

Starting in the mid-1990s, NPO PM started to make significant effort to close the technology gap between Russian and Western communication satellites. Cooperation with the French company Alcatel (now Thales Alenia Space) was begun in 1995. The first satellite of a new second series, Ekspress A-1, had 12 Alcatel-built transponders. It was lost in a rocket failure in 1999, but a replacement, Ekspress A-2 was successfully launched in March 2000.

A major improvement was the Ekspress AM version, first launched in 2003. It has an operational lifetime of 12–15 years and is able to carry 38 channels, including digital TV, radio, broadband and internet. The launch of the Ekspress AM-3 spacecraft in June 2005 completed the modernization of Russia's communications satellite network.

Other versions include the Ekspress 2000, which has a mass of 3200 kg. It has up to 60 transponders, power of 25 kW and a lifetime of 15 years. Satellites using this platform are called the Ekspress AT series and the Ekspress AM30 and AM40 series. Ekspress 1000 is smaller than the 2000 version; 700 kg to 1400 kg, 10 to 12 transponders, 2 kW of power and a lifetime of 15 years. Satellites based on Ekspress 1000 are called Ekspress AK or in its navigational version GLONASS-K.

The developer NPO PM later changed its name to Information Satellite Systems Reshetnev (ISS Reshetnev). From 1999 to 2005, nine Ekspress-A and Ekspress-AM satellites were manufactured by the company.

On 28 August 2008 Ekspress-AM1 switched to DVB-S2 broadcasting system and became the first DVB-S2 satellite in Commonwealth of Independent States (CIS) countries.

The Ekspress AM4 satellite was launched on 17 August 2011, but an anomaly with the Proton-M/Briz-M rocket left it in a useless orbit. The satellite was intentionally deorbited 26 March 2012, despite proposals to place the satellite into a higher-inclination orbit to provide coverage of the Antarctic. The Ekspress-MD2 satellite was lost in a similar failure in August 2012, when the Briz-M failed at the start of its third burn.

== Satellites ==
Between 2000 and 2015, the following Ekspress satellites were launched. All launched were conducted from Baikonour Cosmodrome using the Proton rocket.

- Ekspress A2 12 March 2000.
- Ekspress A3 24 June 2000.
- Ekspress A4 10 June 2002.
- Ekspress AM22 29 December 2003.
- Ekspress AM11 27 April 2004.
- Ekspress AM1 30 October 2004.
- Ekspress AM2 29 March 2005.
- Ekspress AM3 24 June 2005.
- Ekspress AM4 17 August 2011.
- Ekspress AM4R 16 May 2014.
- Ekspress AM6 21 October 2014.
- Ekspress AM7 18 March 2015. Manufactured by Airbus Defence and Space.
- Ekspress AM8 14 September 2015.

On 29 March 2006, the Ekspress AM11 was struck by an unknown object which rendered it inoperable. Luckily, the engineers had enough time in contact with the spacecraft to send it to a parking orbit out of geostationary orbit.

The Ekspress AM4R was launched 16 May 2014 on a Russian Proton-M launch vehicle. The launch vehicle exploded 540 seconds into the flight, shortly before the end of the third-stage engine firing. Ekspress AM4R was a total loss.

The Ekspress AM8 was launched successfully on 14 September 2015. It uses the Ekspress-1000NTB bus.
