= Blok DM-03 =

Fourth stage on the Angara rockets

- Manufacturer: Energia & Krasmash
- Country of origin: Russia
- Used on: Proton-M · Angara A5

Associated stages
- Derived from: Blok D
- Comparable: Briz-M

Launch history
- Status: Active
- Total launches: 9
- Successes (stage only): 6
- Failed: 2 (Note: Although the December 2010 launch failed before the Blok DM-03 was scheduled to perform its part of the flight, the stage's incorrect fuel load was discovered to have caused the failure)
- Lower stage failed: 1
- First flight: 5 December 2010
- Last flight: 12 February 2026

Specifications
- Powered by: 1 × RD-58MF
- Propellant: RP-1/LOX

The Blok DM-03 (Russian: Блок ДМ-03, lit. 'Block DM-03', GRAU index: 11S861-03), is a Russian upper stage used as an optional fourth stage on the Angara A5 heavy-lift rocket. Three have been launched, the first in December 2010; the first two launches failed before fourth stage ignition, the first as a result of a problem with the Blok DM's fuel load. Some versions are also known as Orion.

Initial versions of the Blok DM-03 are powered by a single RD-58M engine, burning RG-1 and liquid oxygen. The last evolution is powered by the improved RD-58MF, a less powerful but more efficient evolution of the venerable engine. It can carry 25% more propellant than the Blok DM-2, which it replaced as a Proton upper stage for some government launches. However most government launches and all commercial missions use the Briz-M instead. The payloads for the first two Blok DM-03 launches were groups of three Uragan-M satellites for the GLONASS programme, with further missions slated to carry three more Uragan-M satellites, and two Ekspress satellites on separate launches. The Blok DM can inject payloads into orbit more accurately than the Briz-M, making it better suited for launching satellites such as the Uragan-M which lack apogee motors.

When production ended in 2012, five Blok DM-03 stages had been produced by RKK Energia, for use on Proton and potentially Zenit rockets. A new version of the upper stage is expected to be introduced once the five launches are complete; all five DM-03s have been slated for Proton launches between 2010 and 2015. During a November 2014 interview, Vladimir Kolmykov, the Deputy General Director of the Chemical Division of Krasnoyarsk Machine-Building Plant, stated that the production of Block-DM was suspended during that year, but work on the stage and development of the RD-58MF resumed during 2015.

== Versions ==
The development for the 11S861-03 stage is covered under the Dvina-DM (Russian: Двина-ДМ) program. The specifications of this program (Technical requirements on development work «Modernization of the upper stage «DM» for the carrier rocket heavy class») defines three different evolutions of the 11S861-03 stage:

- 11S861-03 Phase I Version 1: This version main task is the enlargement of the propellant tank with minimum modifications. The target performance metric is 3,000 kg (6,600 lb) to GEO and 5,500 kg (12,100 lb) to a 1,500 m/s (4,900 ft/s) GTO. Its improvements is:
  - Increase of tank size to 18.7 m (61 ft).
- 11S861-03 Phase I Version 2: This version will introduce general performance improvements. The target performance metric is 3,200 kg (7,100 lb) to GEO and 6,000 kg (13,000 lb) to a 1,500 m/s (4,900 ft/s) GTO. Its improvements are:
  - Replacement of the avionics and instrumentation enclosures.
  - The use of advanced control unit.
  - Replacement of the Navigation and Telemetry systems Chezara Kvant-VD (Russian: Чезара Квант-ВД).
  - Adapted for using the Proton-M's fairing type 14S75 of 4,350 mm (171 in).
  - Structural improvements to reduce the dry weight.
- 11S861-03 Phase II: This change will finally apply the new propulsion unit: The target performance metric is 3,600 kg (7,900 lb) to GEO and 6,600 kg (14,600 lb) to a 1,500 m/s (4,900 ft/s) GTO. Its improvements are:
  - Switch engines to the 11D58MF.
  - Use the main engine for RCS and ullage.
  - Structural weight reduction.

In 2014 RSC Energia designated two versions: 14S48 Persei (Perseus) and 14S49, which incorporated most features of the proposed 11S861-03 Phase II, including the use of nontoxic propellants in auxiliary propulsion systems and new compact flight control system. The 14S48 will use an 11D58M engine, while the 14S49 will apply the new-generation 11D58MF engine.

== Launches ==
s/n	Rocket	Launch date	Payload	Outcome	Remarks
1L	Proton-M	2010-12-05, 10:25:19 UTC	Uragan-M No.39; Uragan-M No.40; Uragan-M No.41	Not fired	Launch failure before Blok DM-03 ignition; Blok DM-03 overfuelled leaving rocket too heavy to achieve parking orbit, reentered before stage 4 ignition
2L	Proton-M	2013-07-02, 02:38:22 UTC	Uragan-M No.48; Uragan-M No.49; Uragan-M No.50	Not fired	Launch failure before Blok DM-03 ignition; first stage guidance failure, loss of control shortly after liftoff
5L	Proton-M	2015-09-14, 19:00 UTC	Ekspress-AM8	Successful	
4L	Proton-M	2019-07-13, 12:30:57 UTC	Spektr-RG	Successful	
3L	Proton-M	2019-12-24, 12:03:02 UTC	Elektro-L №3	Successful	
1L	Angara A5	2021-12-28, 19:00:00 UTC	mass simulator (MGM n°3)	Not restarted	This variant Blok DM-03 is called Persei (Perseus) of version 14S48. This upper stage failed to restart for 2nd burn leaving upper stage & payload in LEO.
6L	Proton-M	2022-10-12, 15:00:00 UTC	AngoSat-2	Successful	
7L	Proton-M	2023-02-05, 09:12:51 UTC	Elektro-L №4	Successful	
1TLI	Angara A5	2024-04-11, 09:00:00 UTC	GMM-KA; Gagarinets; Dummy cubesat	Successful	This variant Blok DM-03 is called Orion.
8L	Proton-M	12 February 2026 at 08:52 UTC	Elektro-L No.5; Jam-e Jam-1 (Iran DBS)	Successful	This launch marked the last use of the Blok DM-03 upper stage for the Proton-M rockets. Blok DM-03 will in the future be solely used by the Angara-5 rockets.

== Failures ==
As of September 2015, 3 Proton-M/Blok DM-03 have been launched, of which 2 have failed. In the 2010 failure, the rocket was too heavy to reach orbit and reentered the atmosphere during a coast phase between the end of third stage flight and the beginning of the Blok DM-03's first burn, whilst the 2013 flight failed after the rocket went out of control seconds after liftoff.

The first launch to use the Blok DM-03 was conducted on 5 December 2010, from Site 81/24 at the Baikonur Cosmodrome. The rocket was expected to deploy three Uragan-M satellites for the GLONASS constellation, with the first three stages of the Proton placing the Blok DM and payload into low Earth orbit, and the Blok DM then propelling the satellites into their operational medium Earth orbits. During preparations for launch, the Blok DM-03 was fuelled using instructions intended for the Blok DM-2, which included an instruction to fill the tanks to 90% capacity. Owing to the DM-03's larger tanks, this was more propellant than needed for the mission, and left the rocket too heavy to achieve orbit. The Blok DM, with payload still attached, reentered over the Pacific before the start of its scheduled first burn. Following the failure, the Blok DM-03 was grounded for further tests, with a Proton-M/Briz-M and several smaller Soyuz-2 rockets being used for GLONASS launches over the next 30 months.

The July 2013 flight, which marked the Blok DM-03's return to flight was another GLONASS launch, also conducted from Site 81/24, with liftoff occurring on time at 02:38:22 UTC. The rocket went off course almost immediately, before disintegrating. The payload fairing and upper stage were among the first parts of the rocket to detach. Debris fell around 1,000 metres (3,300 ft) from the launch pad, with the parts of the rocket still intact exploding upon impact. An investigation determined that three first stage yaw sensors had been installed backwards, resulting in the failure of the vehicle's guidance system.

== See also ==
- Blok D – family of upper stages that this one belongs to.
- Proton – launch vehicle uses this stage.
- Angara A5 – launch vehicle that will only use this stage when launched from Plesetsk Cosmodrome
