= KazSat-2 =

Kazakh communications satellite

- Names: ҚазСат-2; QazSat-2
- Mission type: Communications
- Operator: JSC KazSat
- COSPAR ID: 2011-035B
- SATCAT no.: 37749
- Website: https://www.rcsc.kz/Home/IndexEng
- Mission duration: 12 years (planned); 15 years, 3 months and 18 days (in progress)

Spacecraft properties
- Spacecraft: KazSat-2
- Spacecraft type: Yakhta
- Bus: Yakhta modified
- Manufacturer: Khrunichev (bus); Thales Alenia Space (payload)
- Launch mass: 1,330 kg (2,930 lb)
- Power: 5.8 kW

Start of mission
- Launch date: 15 July 2011, 23:16:10 UTC
- Rocket: Proton-M / Briz-M
- Launch site: Baikonur, Site 200/39
- Contractor: Khrunichev State Research and Production Space Center
- Entered service: September 2011

Orbital parameters
- Reference system: Geocentric orbit
- Regime: Geostationary orbit
- Longitude: 86.5° East

Transponders
- Band: 16 (+4) Ku-band
- Coverage area: Kazakhstan

KazSat-2 (Kazakh: ҚазСат-2, QazSat-2) is the second Kazakh communications satellite after KazSat-1.It is used by 13 telecommunications operators in the country.

This satellite was constructed by Khrunichev State Research and Production Space Center for the satellite bus and Thales Alenia Space (Italy) for the payload. Thales Alenia Space is also the provider of the KazSat-1 and KazSat-3 payloads.

According to Viktor Lefter, president of the Kazakh Republican Center for Space Communications, Kazsat-2 and its sister satellite KazSat-3 saved Kazakhstan ₸18 billion between 2013 and 2017.

== Development and mission ==
Kazakhstan's first telecommunications satellite, KazSat-1, lost communication with the ground in June 2008, ending its mission 10 years early. In response, KazSat-2 was announced in mid-2009. Russian manufacturer Khrunichev State Research and Production Space Center designed and built the satellite for an intended operational life of 12 years.

The launch of KazSat-2 was initially scheduled for December 2010, but was delayed. The satellite was launched on 16 July 2011, at 23:16:10 UTC on a Proton-M / Briz-M launch vehicle. Communications are managed from the Akkol Space Communications Center in the Akmola Region.

The satellite experienced malfunctions which caused a brief communications disruption in June 2015 related to high solar activity. Service was fully restored shortly after.

On 31 March 2017, KazSat-2 experienced a seven-hour communications disruption. During the disruption, all traffic was handled by the newer KazSat-3.

== See also ==
- KazSat-1
- KazSat-3
