= S1.5400 =

First staged combustion rocket engine ever developed, for the Soviet space program

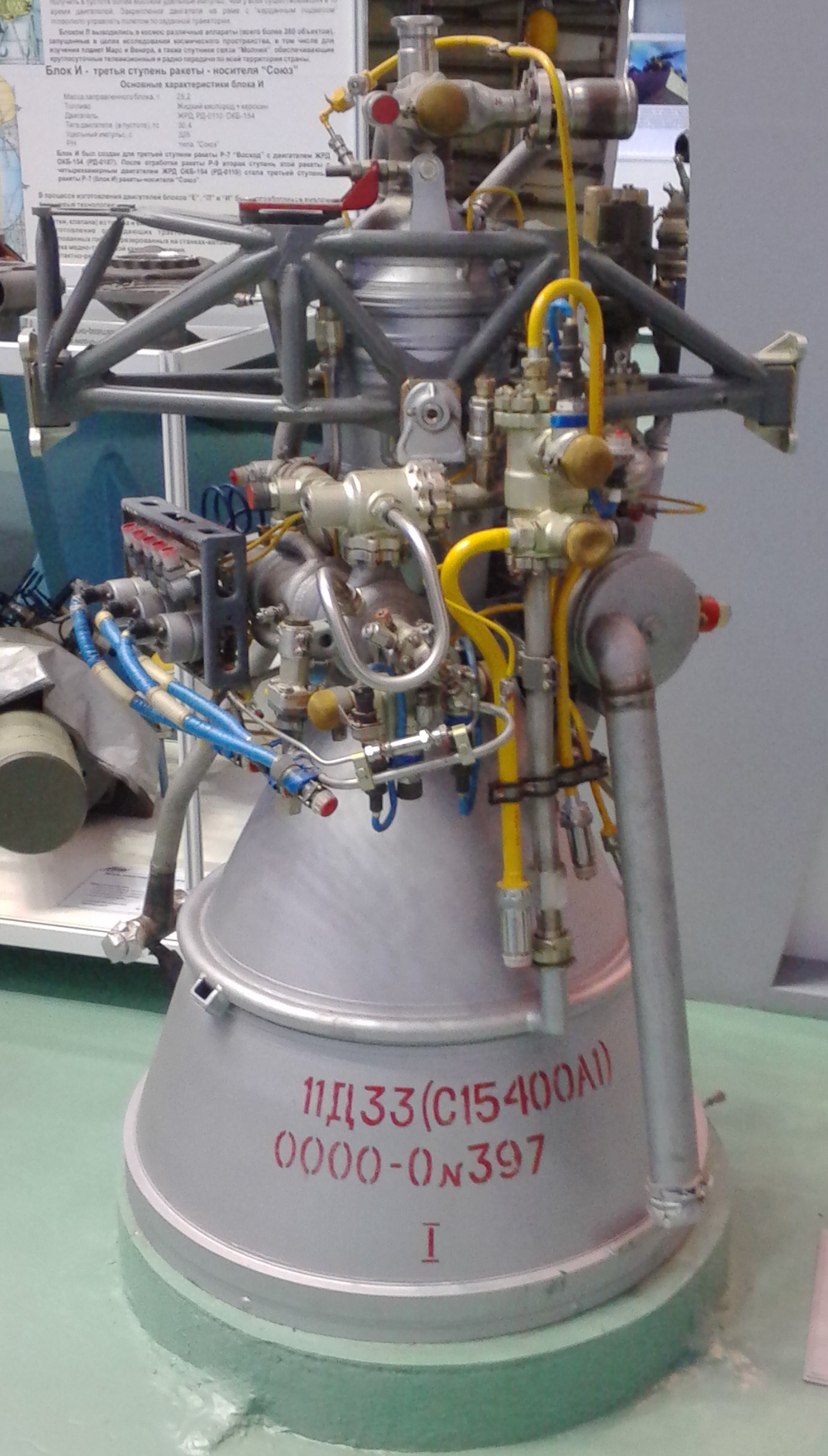
- Country of origin: Soviet Union
- First flight: 1960-10-10
- Last flight: 2010-09-30
- Designer: OKB-1 V. M. Melnikov
- Application: Upper Stage
- Associated LV: Molniya
- Predecessor: S1.5400
- Successor: RD-58
- Status: Retired

Liquid-fuel engine
- Propellant: LOX / kerosene T-1
- Cycle: Staged combustion

Configuration
- Chamber: 1

Performance
- Thrust, vacuum: 66.69 kilonewtons (14,990 lbf)
- Chamber pressure: 5.4 MPa (780 psi)
- Specific impulse, vacuum: 340 seconds
- Burn time: up to 207 s

Dimensions
- Dry mass: 153 kilograms (337 lb)

Used in
- Molniya Blok-L

The S1.5400 (GRAU Index 11D33) was a Soviet single-nozzle liquid-propellant rocket engine burning liquid oxygen and kerosene in an oxidizer-rich staged combustion cycle, the first rocket engine to use this cycle in the world. It was designed by V. M. Melnikov, an alumnus of Isaev, within Korolev's Bureau, for the Molniya fourth stage, the Block-L. It was the first Soviet engine designed for start and restart in vacuum, and had the highest I_{sp} at the time of its deployment.

Its development took from 1958 to 1960. The first production run was started in May 1960, and it passed all the firing tests. Its first flight failed before the Block-L was activated. The first success was in a Venera flight during 1961. Between 1961 and 1964, it went through an improvement program that culminated in the S1.5400A1 version (GRAU Index 11D33M). It improved thrust from 63.74 kilonewtons (14,330 lbf) to 66.69 kilonewtons (14,990 lbf) and I_{sp} from 338.5 s to 340 s while keeping the same mass.

The engine used titanium alloy in its main combustion chamber to tolerate temperatures of up to 700 °C (1,292 °F). The turbopump initial spin-up is pyrotechnic. The engine is attached to a Cardan suspension, which enables it to gimbal up to 3° in two axes.

== See also ==
- Molniya - The original rocket to use the S1.5400.
- OKB-1 - RSC Energiya is the successor of the S1.5400 designer bureau, OKB-1.
