= Ekspress MD2 =

Russian communications satellite

Ekspress-MD2
- Names: Express-MD2
- Mission type: Communications
- Operator: Russian Satellite Communications Company (RSCC)
- COSPAR ID: 2012-044B
- SATCAT no.: 38745
- Website: https://eng.rscc.ru/
- Mission duration: 10 years (planned); Failed on orbit (achieved)

Spacecraft properties
- Spacecraft: Ekspress-MD2
- Spacecraft type: Ekspress-MD
- Bus: Yakhta modified
- Manufacturer: Khrunichev (bus); Alcatel Alenia Space (payload)
- Launch mass: 1,140 kg (2,510 lb)
- Power: 1300 watts

Start of mission
- Launch date: 6 August 2012, 19:31:00 UTC
- Rocket: Proton-M / Briz-M
- Launch site: Baikonur, Site 81/24
- Contractor: Khrunichev State Research and Production Space Center
- Entered service: Failed on orbit

Orbital parameters
- Reference system: Geocentric orbit
- Regime: Medium Earth orbit Geostationary orbit (planned)
- Longitude: 145° East (planned)
- Perigee altitude: 272 km (169 mi)
- Apogee altitude: 4,770 km (2,960 mi)
- Inclination: 49.90°
- Period: 139.09 minutes

Transponders
- Band: 9 transponders: 8 × 40 Mhz C-band; 1 × 1 MHz L-band
- Bandwidth: 321 MHz
- Coverage area: Russia, CIS countries

Ekspress-MD2 was a Russian communications satellite which was lost due to a launch failure on 6 August 2012. Equipped with eight C-band transponders and 1 L-band transponder, it was intended to be located in geostationary orbit at a longitude of 145° East. It was the second Ekspress-MD satellite to be launched, following Ekspress-MD1 in 2009.

== Launch ==
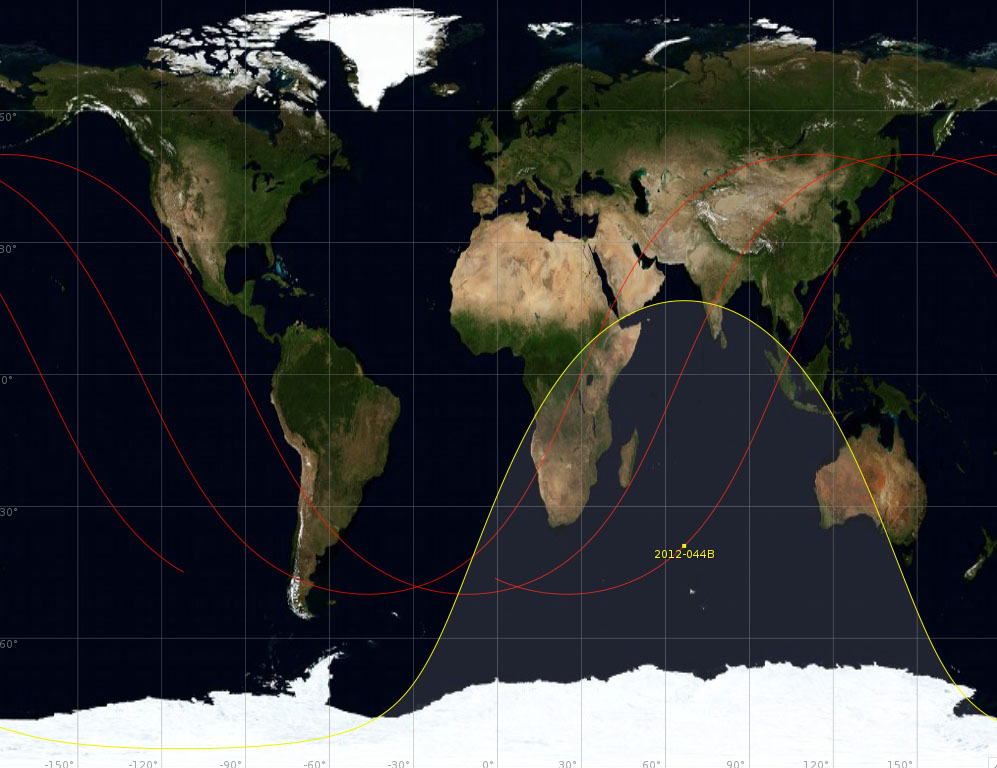
Ground track of Ekspress-MD2

Ekspress-MD2 was launched atop a Proton-M launch vehicle with a Briz-M upper stage on 6 August 2012 at 19:31:00 UTC. The Indonesian Telkom-3 satellite was also carried aboard the launch vehicle. Launch occurred from Site 81/24 at the Baikonur Cosmodrome in Kazakhstan. The first three stages of the Proton launched worked as expected and the satellites were attached to the Briz-M upper stage which would transfer them into geosynchronous orbit. The Briz-M undertakes a series of four burns with coasting stages in order to do this. The third burn was due to be 18 minutes long but the engines cut out after 7 seconds, leaving the satellites in unusable orbits.

This was the second launch failure caused by a Briz-M within twelve months as Ekspress-AM4 was lost in August 2011 due to a computer error. Other recent launch failures included three GLONASS satellites in 2011 and Mars probe Fobos-Grunt on 8 November 2011. All Proton-M launches were suspended and all Briz-M stages were recalled. This triggered discussion on the crisis in the Russian space industry with Russian prime minister Dmitry Medvedev quoted as saying, "We are losing authority and billions of rubles" due to the frequent launch failures. Medvedev chaired a meeting on the issue on 14 August 2012 and President Vladimir Putin had a meeting on organisational issues. One of the suggestions is that Roscosmos could be transformed into a corporation similar to Rosatom.

== Investigation ==
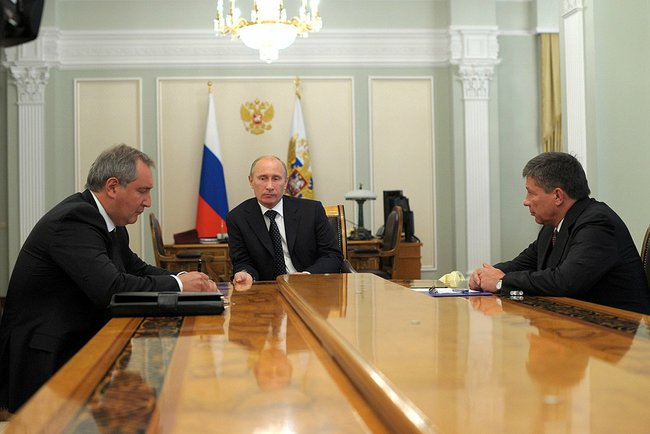
Russian president Vladimir Putin with Roscosmos head Vladimir Popovkin (right) and Dmitry Rogozin (left) in a meeting on problems in the space industry, August 2012.

An investigation was set up by Roskosmos head Vladimir Popovkin and was headed by O.P. Skorobogatov from TsNIIMash. It was reported in early August by Russian newspaper Kommersant that the failure was caused by a fault in the fuel pipe in the Briz-M. The Khrunichev Failure Review Oversight Board found that it was caused by a faulty component in the pressurisation system.

The first Proton-M launch following this incident was the launch of Intelsat 23 on 14 October 2012. It had been postponed from August 2012 due to the launch failure. On 16 October 2012, the Briz-M exploded into eighty pieces. The director general of Khrunichev, Vladimir Nesterov, was dismissed from his post by President Vladimir Putin.
