= Russian super weapons =

Russian weapons systems announced in 2018

In March 2018, as part of his Presidential Address to the Federal Assembly, the Russian president Vladimir Putin announced six novel nuclear or dual-use weapons systems, popularly dubbed "super weapons" (Russian: супероружие, romanized: superoruzhie).

Putin stated that together the weapons provided Russia with a strategic capability that was impossible for America to intercept, restoring Russia's nuclear deterrence capability in the face of American technological developments following America's withdrawal from the Anti-Ballistic Missile Treaty.

The "super weapons" named were:

- The Avangard hypersonic glide vehicle (strategic)
- The 9M730 Burevestnik nuclear-powered cruise missile (strategic)
- The 3M22 Zircon scramjet-powered anti-ship hypersonic cruise missile (tactical/theater)
- The Kh-47M2 Kinzhal hypersonic air-launched ballistic missile (tactical/theater)
- The Poseidon unmanned underwater vehicle (strategic)
- The RS-28 Sarmat liquid-fueled, MIRV-equipped super-heavy ICBM (strategic)

== Deployment ==
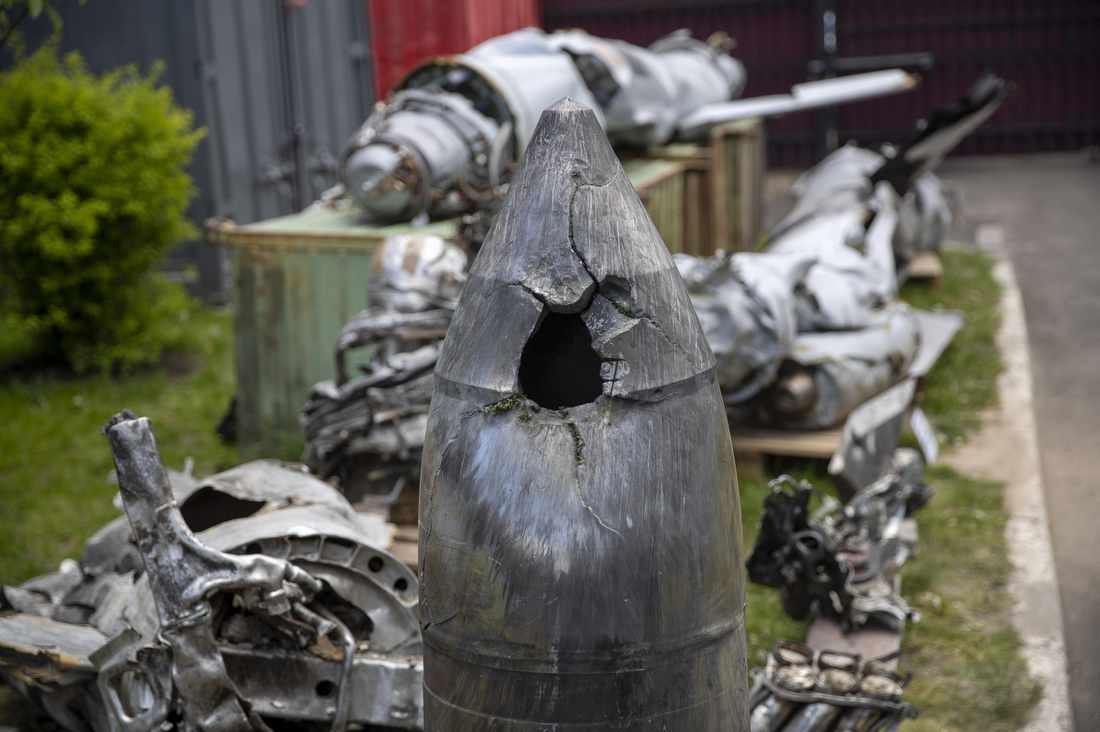
Purported remnant of a Kinzhal warhead displayed in Ukraine in May 2023

The Kh-47M2 Kinzhal missile started test operations in December 2017 and has been deployed since 2018.

On 27 December 2019, TASS reported that the first missile regiment armed with the Avangard hypersonic glide vehicle officially entered combat duty.

As of 2020, the 9M730 Burevestnik nuclear-powered missile was still under development. The Nyonoksa radiation accident appears to have been caused by an accident while testing a prototype.

TASS reported that the first contract for producing the RS-28 Sarmat missiles was signed in August 2022.

On 16 January 2023, TASS reported that the first batch of the Poseidon nuclear-powered UUVs had been manufactured.

== Combat history ==
Of the six systems, only two are known to have been used in action: the Kh-47M2 Kinzhal, which has been employed in a non-nuclear capacity during the Russo-Ukrainian war, and 3M22 Zircon launched from the Black Sea onto land target.

In 2023, it was claimed that a Kinzhal missile had been shot down by the Ukrainian air defense forces using a MIM-104 Patriot missile defence system. On 10 May 2023, the Ukrainian politician Vitali Klitschko showed fragments of the alleged downed Kinzhal missile for Bild journalists in Kyiv. In contradiction to Ukrainian claims, Russian media reported that the fragments closely resembled the concrete-piercing BETAB-500ShP aerial bomb. On 16 May 2023, Ukraine's air command claimed to have intercepted all six Kinzhal missiles that had been launched during a Russian attack.

== See also ==
- Hypersonic weapon
- Nuclear triad
- Wunderwaffe
