= Yakhta (satellite bus) =

Russian satellite bus

The Yakhta (Russian: Яхта, literally Yacht) is a satellite bus designed and manufactured by Khrunichev. It is a small unpressurized bus low Earth Orbit to medium Earth orbit to GEO. It has four different generations and its different versions have been used from civilian communications to satellite navigation.

== Satellites ==
=== Launched ===
- Monitor-E
- KazSat-1
- KazSat-2
- Ekspress MD1
- Ekspress MD2

== See also ==
- Khrunichev – Designer and manufacturer of the platform.
