= Telkom-3S =

Indonesian communications satellite

- Mission type: Communications
- Operator: Telkom Indonesia
- COSPAR ID: 2017-007A
- SATCAT no.: 41944
- Website: https://www.telkom.co.id/sites
- Mission duration: 16 years (planned); 9 years and 3 months (in progress)

Spacecraft properties
- Spacecraft: Telkom-3S
- Spacecraft type: Spacebus
- Bus: Spacebus-4000B2
- Manufacturer: Thales Alenia Space
- Launch mass: 3,550 kg (7,830 lb)
- Dimensions: 1.8 m x 2.95 m x 2.86 m
- Power: 6.4 kW

Start of mission
- Launch date: 14 February 2017, 21:39 UTC
- Rocket: Ariane 5ECA (VA235)
- Launch site: Centre Spatial Guyanais, Kourou, ELA-3
- Contractor: Arianespace
- Entered service: 17 April 2017

Orbital parameters
- Reference system: Geocentric orbit
- Regime: Geostationary orbit
- Longitude: 118° East

Transponders
- Band: 42 transponders: 24 C-Band; 8 Extended C-Band; 10 Ku-Band
- Coverage area: Indonesia, Southeast Asia, Malaysia

Telkom-3S is an Indonesian geostationary communications satellite built as a replacement of Telkom-3 that was lost due to a launch failure on 6 August 2012. Telkom-3S was successfully launched on 14 February 2017, at 21:39 UTC and commissioned into service on 17 April 2017.

== Satellite description ==
Telkom-3S is fitted with 24 C-Band transponders, 8 extended C-Band transponders and 10 Ku-Band transponders. The C-band payload will cover Indonesia and Southeast Asia, while the extended C-band payload will cover both Indonesia and part of Malaysia. The Ku-band payload will specifically cover Indonesia. Telkom-3S will provide high-definition television (HDTV) services along with mobile communications and internet applications.
