= Dallas Analytics =

Ukrainian data analysis firm

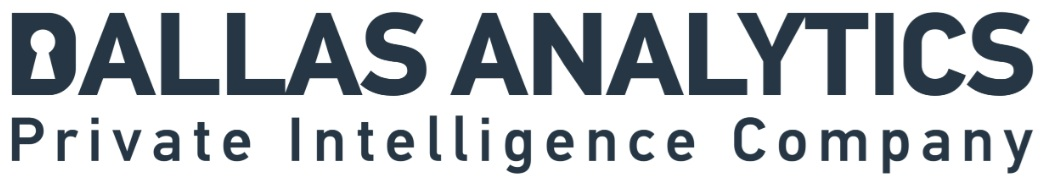
- Logo of the Dallas Analytics company (used since 2026)
- Website type: Private company
- Available in: English, Ukrainian
- Website: dallas-analytics.com
- Commercial: Yes
- Launched: 10 October 2014; 12 years ago
- Current status: Online
- Content license: CC BY-SA 4.0

Dallas Analytics (Ukrainian: Приватна розвідувальна компанія Dallas Analytics) is a Ukrainian private intelligence and research organisation. The organisation focuses on evaluating and countering Russia’s defence-industrial base and wartime economy by providing researchers, media entities, and policy experts with primary-source data, empirical analysis, open-source intelligence (OSINT), and proprietary research databases.

The founding team has monitored and documented Russian defence procurement, sanctions evasion networks, state security organs, and foreign facilitating actors since 2014 through various investigative initiatives and research partnerships. In 2025, the group formally established Dallas Analytics to institutionalise these efforts, expanding its core team of analysts and security experts while building a broader international research community.

To advance public-interest reporting, the organisation maintains proactive cooperation with global media outlets, providing journalists and newsrooms with data-backed expert commentary, customised datasets, and investigative research infrastructure.

== Partnerships ==
Dallas Analytics provides analytical research and open-source intelligence to Ukrainian state institutions and to international partners working on defence, national security and sanctions enforcement. Among publicly documented engagements, on 1 October 2026 the organisation joined a meeting convened by Vladyslav Vlasiuk, Adviser and Commissioner of the President of Ukraine for Sanctions Policy, on tightening sanctions pressure on Russia, alongside other analytical and civil society groups. Participants reviewed the designation of foreign suppliers of components to the Russian defence industry, additional pressure on Russia's shadow tanker fleet, and the A7 payment platform used to settle transactions outside SWIFT; the Office of the President stated that government bodies regularly draw on analysis produced by the participating organisations.

In addition, Dallas Analytics regularly collaborates on investigative projects with leading media organisations and analytical groups, notably United24 Media, The Insider, and Frontelligence Insight.

The organisation's research, empirical datasets, and analytical findings have been cited and featured by major international broadsheets, business publications, and specialized defence media, including The Financial Times, Forbes, Frankfurter Allgemeine Zeitung, El País, Defense News, The Moscow Times,, The Guardian, and Aerospace Global News.

== Operational activities ==
Dallas Analytics employs a multi-disciplinary research methodology combining open-source intelligence (OSINT), quantitative data analytics, and targeted primary-source collection. The organisation synthesises large-scale empirical datasets alongside specialised research repositories to map complex defence supply chains, procurement networks, and state-backed evasion mechanisms.

=== Research & Key Investigations ===
Dallas Analytics publishes empirical investigations and strategic analyses examining Russian defence-industrial capabilities, sanctions evasion, and state security operations. Key analytical publications and primary-source disclosures include:

- Strategic Missile Readiness (RS-28 Sarmat): Publishing internal defence-industry correspondence demonstrating that Russia's RS-28 Sarmat ICBM remained in testing stages despite official claims of combat deployment, exposing pricing disputes and manufacturing delays between Roscosmos entities.
- Space Sector Procurement & Foreign Industrial Tooling: Documenting the acquisition of foreign industrial machinery by the Khrunichev State Research and Production Space Center and analysing the trade networks of East Asian suppliers facilitating hardware delivery to Russian military space initiatives.
- Precision Weapon Component Diversion: Evaluating internal production documentation and microchip procurement files to establish verified manufacturing volumes and supply bottlenecks for Kh-101 cruise missiles, including the diversion of Austrian-manufactured electronic components.
- Military Transport & Strategic Aviation Maintenance: Disclosing technical records from the Russian aerospace enterprise JSC Aviaremont, detailing systemic engineering failures and maintenance backlogs within the Antonov (An) military transport fleet.
- Energy & Industrial Supply Chain Evasion: Uncovering illicit procurement channels used to supply sanctioned oil extraction hardware and industrial automotive components to Russian and Belarussian state enterprises.
- Maritime Sanctions Evasion & Shadow Fleet Architecture: Examining internal correspondence from state shipping entities (such as Sovcomflot), crewing agencies, and vessel masters to map the human infrastructure, fraudulent flag registries, and ship-to-ship (STS) transfer tactics sustaining Russian seaborne crude oil exports.
- State Information Control (AZAL Flight 8243): Documenting state-directed information management and identity obfuscation procedures surrounding casualty records from the AZAL Flight 8243 crash.

== Analytical materials ==
"Oreshnik" guidance system analysis. On June 16, 2026, the Institute for the Study of War published a brief summary of a Dallas Analytics investigation detailing the structural, organizational, and technical issues contributing to the low strike precision of the Russian "Oreshnik" ballistic missile. The investigation relied on intercepted email correspondence between lead engineers and managers overseeing the production of the missile's guidance systems, alongside an analysis of missile remains collected from impact sites in Ukraine. The report concluded that the contemporary Russian defense industry is unable to replicate Soviet-era missile guidance technologies (gyroscopes). Furthermore, Russia faces substantial difficulties in developing new guidance systems using modern components, largely due to international sanctions and an inability to manufacture advanced electronics domestically. These findings generated significant media attention, particularly within the Russian-language press. On July the 6th Forbes published an interview of the Dallas representative stating that the Oreshnik is no conventional "wonder weapon," but an expensive system with significant accuracy limitations that is unlikely to alter conditions at the front. Instead, "the true target of the Oreshnik is the West" as Moscow uses the weapon to signal escalation while projecting strength at home.

Azov Optical-Mechanical Plant (AOMZ). On 26 September 2026, the day of a Ukrainian strike on AOMZ in Rostov Oblast, Dallas Analytics published documentation placing the facility inside the production chains of seven Russian missile programmes, including systems designed to carry nuclear warheads. The evidence base comprised internal correspondence, state contract records and component cooperation schedules, alongside a production plan reconstructed from a bill of materials. The documents, dated April 2023 to March 2025, identified AOMZ as a supplier of a navigation lidar and flight automation unit for the Kh-101 cruise missile, of electrical and power components for the R-37M long-range air-to-air missile, and of elements within the Oreshnik guidance system. The plant had been added to the United States Entity List with effect from 1 April 2022 and was subsequently designated by the European Union, Canada, Japan, Switzerland, New Zealand and Ukraine, among others. Reporting on the documents in Ukrainian and international outlets, among them Defense News, Kyiv Independent, The Insider, УНІАН, НВ, «Мілітарний», and Wirtualna Polska - have focused on the plant's position in the missile supply chains, on the annual volumes set out in the Tactical Missiles Corporation correspondence, and on the effect of the strike on Russian missile output.

Russian military supplies to Iran ("K-10"). On 5 November 2026 the Financial Times published an investigation, by Max Seddon and Miles Johnson, built on a Russian defence-industry production document supplied by Dallas Analytics. The document, a May 2024 letter from the Vympel design bureau to the Kolomna Machine-Building Design Bureau (KBM), pressed for faster deliveries of components for the APU-L and APU-305 helicopter-mounted launchers and warned that delays placed nine contracts at risk. The accompanying schedule listed seven Russian customers and two foreign buyers: China, with an order for 192 APU-305 units, and a buyer identified only as "K-10", with an order for 90 APU-L units. Rosoboronexport, the Russian state arms exporter, uses the code K-10 for Iran. Both launcher types carry the LMUR (Izdeliye 305) guided missile used by Russian forces in Ukraine; the documents do not establish whether the launchers were delivered. Dallas Analytics published the underlying primary documents the same day, setting out a wider record of deliveries booked against the same customer code: a February 2019 production order clearing the APU-305 for series manufacture, a 2022 Irkutsk Aviation Plant report scheduling six Yak-130 trainers for consignee "GP-K10" in 2023, a March 2023 Rostvertol letter on upgraded Mi-28 helicopters for K-10, an October 2022 supply request from NPP Zvezda for forty ejection-seat pyrotechnic kits with the consignee line "K10 Iran", and contract No. 032-24/361//063, which allocated power supply units for the 90 APU-L launchers to the Azov Optical-Mechanical Plant for shipment between late 2024 and December 2025. The findings were reported by The Guardian, Al Jazeera, Iran International, i24NEWS, International Business Times, Army Recognition, Aerospace Global News, Times of Defence, Indian Defence News - with coverage concentrating on the scale of the order, the use of a customer code to mask the recipient, and the implications for Russian-Iranian military cooperation.
