= RS-28 Sarmat =

Russian intercontinental ballistic missile

RS-28 Sarmat (РС-28 Сармат)
- April 2022 launch of the Sarmat ICBM at Plesetsk Cosmodrome
- Type: Superheavy Intercontinental ballistic missile
- Place of origin: Russia

Service history
- Used by: Strategic Rocket Forces

Production history
- Designer: Makeyev Rocket Design Bureau
- Manufacturer: KrasMash, ZlatMash, NPO Energomash, NPO Mashinostroyeniya, KBKhA

Specifications
- Mass: 208.1 tonnes
- Length: 35.3 m (115 feet)
- Diameter: 3 m (9.8 feet)
- Warhead: Thermonuclear: Avangard Hypersonic Glide Vehicles; Up to 16 warheads of various types
- Engine: Three-stage liquid-fuel rocket; First stage: PDU-99 (RD-274 derived)
- Propellant: Liquid
- Operational range: 18,000 kilometres (11,000 mi) to 35,000 kilometres (22,000 mi) (sub-orbital flight)
- Guidance system: Inertial guidance, GLONASS, Astro-inertial
- Launch platform: Silo

The RS-28 Sarmat (Russian: РС-28 Сармат, named after the Sarmatians; NATO reporting name: SS-29 or SS-X-30), often colloquially referred to as Satan II by media outlets, is a three-stage Russian silo-based, liquid-fueled, HGV-capable and FOBS-capable super-heavy intercontinental ballistic missile (ICBM) produced by the Makeyev Rocket Design Bureau. It is intended to replace the Soviet R-36M ICBM in Russia's arsenal. It was one of six new Russian strategic weapons unveiled by Russian president Vladimir Putin on 1 March 2018.

Development began in 2011 with an expected entry into service of 2018-2020. The program experienced numerous delays and test failures. The first test flight occurred on 20 April 2022. A catastrophic test failure in September 2024 destroyed the Plesetsk Cosmodrome test site and subsequent test launches were performed at the Yasny/Dombarovsky operational base. As of 2026, the missile has not yet entered service.

== Development ==
The Makeyev Rocket Design Bureau was contracted to develop the RS-28 in June 2011.

The program experienced administrative, technical and manufacturing delays, and numerous test failures. The missile was originally expected to enter service in 2018-2020; by February 2014, the target was 2020. Delivery of the prototype from KrasMash was expected in June 2015. The program was "accelerated" due to the Russo-Ukrainian war, but in June 2015 TASS reported that the prototype was only 60% complete and delivery was rescheduled for September or October; the cause was identified as late delivery of subcomponents by contractors. In September, delivery of the prototype was expected by the end of 2015 with launch tests commencing in 2016. The PDU-99 first-stage engine, designed by NPO Energomash and manufactured by Proton-PM, was tested in August 2016; reportedly the test firings were delayed by development problems.

Silo launch tests were originally expected in 2015. In March 2017, TASS reported the launch tests at Plesetsk Cosmodrome were delayed until later in the year because the test stands were not ready; this was the third launch test delay. The first successful launch test occurred in December 2017, with the missile flying a few dozen kilometers within the test range.

NASA FIRMS imagery of the 20 and 21 September 2024 fire at Plesetsk with first detection at 2024-09-20 23:52:00 (UTC)

The test flight record has been described as "abysmal". The first successful flight test occurred at Plesetsk on 20 April 2022. According to the United States, a February 2023 test failed On 20 September 2024, a test failed and caused a 60 metres (200 ft) diameter crater. The missile may have exploded in the silo, possibly caused by the rocket crashing into the silo after a rocket motor failure, or the liquid fuel being ignited during defuelling if the test was cancelled. The damage left Plesetsk without a suitable silo for RS-28 testing. Testing likely moved to the Yasny/Dombarovsky base operated by Strategic Rocket Forces' (SRF) 13th Division. A silo previously used for Dnepr rocket test launches was reactivated and upgraded after the September 2024 failure for the RS-28. On 28 November 2025, a RS-28 test launch from the upgraded silo failed shortly after rocket motor ignition and the missile crashed. Yasny/Dombarovsky performed a successful test launch on 12 May 2026.

Dallas Analytics obtained internal Russian documents concerning a delayed shipment of missile parts from ZlatMash to Uzhur in 2022. The delays were caused by the Russian Ministry of Defence (MoD) not having finalized supplier contracts, the SRF being unable to provide adaquate transport, and incomplete documentation. Time saving measures to compensate for the delays led to violations of process, which may have been a contributing factor to the 2024 arrest of Vladimir Verteletsky, head of the MOD department responsible for the contracts. Price negotiations with suppliers were ongoing as late as mid-2025.

On 16 August 2022, a state contract was signed for the manufacture and supply of the Sarmat strategic missile system.

According to the Bulletin of the Atomic Scientists, the political pressure from the delays caused Russian officials to release confusing and contradictory reports of progress and repeated claims that the missile was close to entering service. Examples include the announcement in September 2023 by Yury Borisov, Director General of Roscosmos, that the missile had entered service, followed by the announcement by Vladimir Putin, the President of Russia, that the missile was not in mass production and had yet to be delivered to the military.

== Deployment ==
By 2016, the RS-28 was part of an effort to replace Soviet ICBMs by 2022. By 2026, the RS-28 was expected to replace the RS-20V, UR-100N UTTKh, and Avangard-equipped UR-100Ns.

In December 2019, a National Defense Management Center exhibition reported that 20 regiments were expected to be rearmed with the RS-28 from 2020 to 2027.

The RS-20V formally began retiring in 2021. The 302nd Missile Regiment at Uzhur was the first to begin conversion. By March 2026, the regiment was disarmed and its infrastructure was being upgraded to handle the RS-28.

According to Russian state media sources, RS-28's launch sites were to be equipped with the "Mozyr" active protection system, which is claimed to negate a potential adversary's first strike advantage by discharging a cloud of metal arrows or balls kinetically that allegedly would destroy incoming bombs, cruise missiles and ICBM warheads at altitudes of up to 6 km (3.7 mi); however development of the Mozyr system ceased in 1991.

== Design ==
The Sarmat is a three-stage, liquid-fueled missile with a range of 18,000 kilometres (11,000 mi) and a launch weight of 208.1 tonnes (204.8 long tons; 229.4 short tons). The missile is 35.3 metres (116 ft) long and 3 metres (9.8 ft) in diameter. Designated a "heavy" ICBM, the Sarmat can load a wide variety of warhead options. According to Russian media, Sarmat is capable of carrying 10 tonnes of payload, of ten 750 kiloton, 15 or 16 lighter MIRV warheads, or Avangard hypersonic glide vehicles (HGVs), or a combination of warheads and several countermeasures against anti-ballistic missile systems. According to MoD, the missile is a response to the U.S. Prompt Global Strike system.

According to Russia, the RS-28 has a range of over 35,000 km (22,000 mi) using a sub-orbital trajectory.

According to Russian President Vladimir Putin, Sarmat has a short boost phase, which shortens the interval when it can be tracked by satellites with infrared sensors, such as the U.S. Space-Based Infrared System, allegedly making it more difficult to intercept. Sarmat provides Russia with a Fractional Orbital Bombardment (FOBS) capability that can fly a trajectory over the South Pole to targets in the United States, which has the advantage of being able to avoid missile defense systems in the northern United States.

== See also ==
- Agni-VI – (India)
- DF-41 – (China)
- DF-5 – (China)
- LGM-35 Sentinel – (United States)
- RS-26 Rubezh – (Russia)

== Sources ==
- Kristensen, Hans M.; Korda, Matt; Johns, Eliana; Knight-Boyle, Mackenzie (2026). "Russian nuclear weapons, 2026". Bulletin of the Atomic Scientists. 82 (3): 221–254. ISSN 1938-3282.
- Maire, Christian; Marcuz, Etienne (29 January 2026). Analysis and possible consequences of the failure of a Russian ICBM flight on 28 November 2025 (PDF) (Report). FRS note. Vol. 03/2025. Foundation for Strategic Research.
