= Ekspress-AM22 =

Russian communications satellite

- Names: Экспресс-АМ22; SESAT-2; Eutelsat SESAT-2; Ekspress-AM22; Express-AM22
- Mission type: Communications
- Operator: RSCC / Eutelsat Communications
- COSPAR ID: 2003-060A
- SATCAT no.: 28134
- Website: eng.rscc.ru
- Mission duration: 12 years (planned); 15 years (achieved)

Spacecraft properties
- Spacecraft: Ekspress-AM22
- Spacecraft type: KAUR
- Bus: MSS-2500-GSO
- Manufacturer: NPO PM (bus); Alcatel Space (payload)
- Launch mass: 2,600 kg (5,700 lb)
- Dry mass: 590 kg (1,300 lb)
- Power: 6 kW

Start of mission
- Launch date: 28 December 2003, 23:00:00 UTC
- Rocket: Proton-K / DM-2M
- Launch site: Baikonur, Site 200/39
- Contractor: Khrunichev State Research and Production Space Center
- Entered service: 9 March 2004

End of mission
- Disposal: Graveyard orbit
- Deactivated: January 2019

Orbital parameters
- Reference system: Geocentric orbit
- Regime: Geostationary orbit
- Longitude: 53° East (2004–2015); 80° East (2015–2019)

Transponders
- Band: 24 Ku-band
- Coverage area: Europe, Russia, Siberia, Asia

Ekspress-AM22 (Russian: Экспресс-АМ22, meaning Express-AM22) is a Russian communications satellite. It belongs to the Russian Satellite Communications Company (RSCC) based in Moscow, Russia.

== Eutelsat SESAT-2 ==
The satellite has a total of 24 transponders, 12 of which are referred to as SESAT-2, and are leased to Eutelsat by the Russian Satellite Communications Company (RSCC). The remaining 12 transponders, with domestic coverage of the Russian Federation, are commercialised by the RSCC under the name Ekspress-AM22.

== Launch ==
Ekspress-AM22 was launched by Khrunichev State Research and Production Space Center, using a Proton-K / DM-02 launch vehicle. The launch took place at 23:00:00 UTC on 28 December 2003, from Site 200/39 at Baikonur Cosmodrome, Kazakhstan. Successfully deployed into geostationary transfer orbit (GTO), Ekspress-AM22 raised itself into an operational geostationary orbit using its apogee motor.

== Mission ==
The satellite can be received in Europe, Asia, the Middle East and the most part of Russia. The transfer takes place in the Ku-band. Since the launch of Ekspress-AM6, Ekspress-AM22 has been moved to a new orbit at 80.0° East.
