= Ekspress-AM4R =

Russian communications satellite

- Names: Экспресс-АМ4Р; Express-AM4R
- Mission type: Communications
- Operator: Russian Satellite Communications Company (RSCC)
- Website: https://eng.rscc.ru/
- Mission duration: 15 years (planned); Failed to orbit

Spacecraft properties
- Spacecraft: Ekspress-AM4R
- Spacecraft type: Eurostar
- Bus: Eurostar-3000
- Manufacturer: EADS Astrium
- Launch mass: 5,775 kg (12,732 lb)
- Dry mass: 1,465 kg (3,230 lb)

Start of mission
- Launch date: 15 May 2014, 21:42:00 UTC
- Rocket: Proton-M / Briz-M
- Launch site: Baikonur, Site 200/39
- Contractor: Khrunichev State Research and Production Space Center
- Entered service: Failed to orbit

Orbital parameters
- Reference system: Geocentric orbit (planned)
- Regime: Geosynchronous orbit
- Longitude: 80° East

Transponders
- Band: 63 transponders: 30 C-band; 28 Ku-band; 2 Ka-band; 3 L-band
- Coverage area: Russia

Ekspress-AM4R (Russian: Экспресс-АМ4Р meaning Express-AM4R) was a Russian communications satellite intended for operation by the Russian Satellite Communications Company (RSCC). Constructed as a replacement for Ekspress-AM4, which was left unusable after the upper stage of the launch vehicle carrying it malfunctioned, Ekspress-AM4R was also lost due to a launch failure.

== Satellite description ==
Astrium, which had become part of Airbus Defence and Space by the time of the satellite's launch, constructed Ekspress-AM4R, which was based on the Eurostar-3000 satellite bus. It was identical in design to Ekspress-AM4, with a mass of 5,775 kg (12,732 lb) and a planned operational lifespan of fifteen years. The satellite carried sixty-three transponders: thirty operating in the C-band of the electromagnetic spectrum, twenty eight in the Ku-band, two in the Ka-band and three in the L-band. It was to have been the largest and most powerful satellite in the Ekspress constellation.

== Launch ==
Khrunichev State Research and Production Space Center was contracted to launch Ekspress-AM4R, using a Proton-M / Briz-M launch vehicle - the same configuration that had failed to deploy Ekspress-AM4. The launch took place from Site 200/39 at the Baikonur Cosmodrome, at 21:42:00 UTC on 15 May 2014. Shortly after launch the launch vehicle was reported to have encountered a problem during third stage flight, and as a result the satellite failed to reach orbit.
