= Ekspress-AM1 =

Russian communications satellite

- Names: Экспресс-АМ1; Ekspress-AM1; Express-AM1
- Mission type: Communications
- Operator: Russian Satellite Communications Company (RSCC)
- COSPAR ID: 2004-043A
- SATCAT no.: 28463
- Website: https://eng.rscc.ru/
- Mission duration: 12 years (planned); 8.5 years (achieved)

Spacecraft properties
- Spacecraft: Ekspress-AM1
- Spacecraft type: KAUR
- Bus: MSS-2500-GSO (MS-767)
- Manufacturer: NPO PM (bus); NEC (payload)
- Launch mass: 2,542 kg (5,604 lb)
- Dry mass: 570 kg (1,260 lb)
- Power: 6 kW

Start of mission
- Launch date: 29 October 2004, 22:11:00 UTC
- Rocket: Proton-K / DM-2M
- Launch site: Baikonur, Site 200/39
- Contractor: Khrunichev State Research and Production Space Center
- Entered service: 16 February 2005

End of mission
- Disposal: Graveyard orbit
- Deactivated: 10 August 2013

Orbital parameters
- Reference system: Geocentric orbit
- Regime: Geostationary orbit
- Longitude: 40° East (2005-2013)

Transponders
- Band: 28 transponders: 9 C-band; 18 Ku-band; 1 L-band
- Coverage area: Russia, CIS

Ekspress-AM1 (Russian: Экспресс-АМ1, meaning Express-AM1) is a Russian domestic communications satellite. It belongs to the Russian Satellite Communications Company (RSCC) based in Moscow, Russia. To provide of communications services (digital television, telephony, videoconferencing, data transmission, the Internet access) and to deploy satellite networks by applying VSAT technology to Russia and its neighbors (CIS).

== Satellite description ==
The satellite has a total of 28 transponders, was 9 C-band, 18 Ku-band and 1 L-band transponders. The Ekspress-AM1 Russian domestic communications satellite, built by Information Satellite Systems Reshetnev (NPO PM)) for Kosmicheskaya Svyaz. The communications payload was built by the Japanese companies NEC and Toshiba.

== Launch ==
Ekspress-AM1 was launched by Khrunichev State Research and Production Space Center, using a Proton-K / DM-2M launch vehicle. The launch took place at 22:11:00 UTC on 29 October 2004, from Site 200/39 at Baikonur Cosmodrome, Kazakhstan. Successfully deployed into geostationary transfer orbit (GTO), Ekspress-AM1 raised itself into an operational geostationary orbit using its apogee motor.

== Mission ==
Ekspress-AM1 failed in May 2010 following a shutdown of its attitude-control system. It was recovered, but inclination increased afterwards. On 10 August 2013, the satellite was finally decommissioned and afterwards sent to a graveyard orbit.
