= KazSat-1 =

Kazakh communications satellite

- Names: ҚазСат-1; QazSat-1
- Mission type: Communications
- Operator: JSC KazSat
- COSPAR ID: 2006-022A
- SATCAT no.: 29230
- Website: http://www.rcsc.kz/Home/IndexEng
- Mission duration: 10 years (planned); 2 years (achieved)

Spacecraft properties
- Spacecraft: KazSat-1
- Spacecraft type: Yakhta
- Bus: Yakhta modified
- Manufacturer: Khrunichev (bus); Thales Alenia Space (payload)
- Launch mass: 1,380 kg (3,040 lb)
- Dry mass: 820 kg (1,810 lb)
- Power: 1.3 kW

Start of mission
- Launch date: 17 June 2006, 22:44:05 UTC
- Rocket: Proton-K / Blok DM-2M
- Launch site: Baikonur, Site 200/39
- Contractor: Khrunichev State Research and Production Space Center
- Entered service: 17 October 2006

End of mission
- Disposal: Graveyard orbit
- Deactivated: August 2009
- Last contact: 26 November 2008

Orbital parameters
- Reference system: Geocentric orbit
- Regime: Geostationary orbit
- Longitude: 103° East

Transponders
- Band: 12 Ku-band
- Bandwidth: 72 MHz
- Coverage area: Kazakhstan, Central Asia, Caucasus, Central Russia

KazSat-1 (Kazakh: ҚазСат-1, QazSat-1) is the first Kazakh communications satellite. It was launched on 17 June 2006, at 22:44:05 UTC by Proton-K / Blok DM-2M launch vehicle. This satellite was constructed by Khrunichev State Research and Production Space Center for the satellite bus and Thales Alenia Space (Italy) for the payload. Thales Alenia Space is also the provider of KazSat-2 and KazSat-3 payloads.

== Satellite description ==
The contract for the manufacture and launch of the first Kazakhstani geostationary spacecraft was signed in January 2004. Twelve Ku-band transponders (each 72 MHz), KazSat-1 was a communications satellite planned to occupy a geosynchronous orbit approximately 36,000 km (22,000 mi) above the Earth. It was produced by Khrunichev State Research and Production Space Center in cooperation with Thales Alenia Space (Italy). The cost of Kazakhstan for the production of the first satellite amounted to US$65 million.

The spacecraft was delivered to the Baikonur Cosmodrome on 28 April 2006. The launch took place on 18 June 2006 at 4:44 a.m. (UTC+6) using a Proton-K launch vehicle. For the first time in the history of the Proton rocket, in addition to Russian symbols, the flag of Kazakhstan and the insignia of the Republican Center for Space Communications were displayed. The launch of the first Kazakh satellite was observed at the cosmodrome by the President of Kazakhstan, Nursultan Nazarbayev, and the President of Russia, Vladimir Putin.

== Mission ==
Partial control of the satellite was lost in July 2008 and completely in October 2008. It was supposed to serve for 10 years, but already on 26 November 2008, due to a failure in the on-board digital system, it stopped responding to control signals. The failure was declared irreversible, and in August 2009, the satellite was transferred to a burial orbit.

== Specifications ==
- Zone of service over Kazakhstan territory: Elliptic form 4,000 km (2,500 mi) by 6,100 km (3,800 mi)
- Frequencies:
  - Transmit: 10950 — 11700 MHz
  - Receive: 14000 — 14500 MHz
  - Beacon: 11199.5 MHz
- Power:
  - Television: Minimum 52.5 dBW
  - Coherent: Minimum 49.0 dBW
- Reception quality: At least 5.3 db/to
- Transmitter capacity:
  - Television (saturation mode) > 65 watts
  - Communications and data transmission (saturation mode) > 45 watts
  - Communications and data transmission (quasilinear mode) > 28 watts

== See also ==
- KazSat-2
- KazSat-3
