= Ekspress AM8 =

Russian communications satellite

Ekspress-AM8
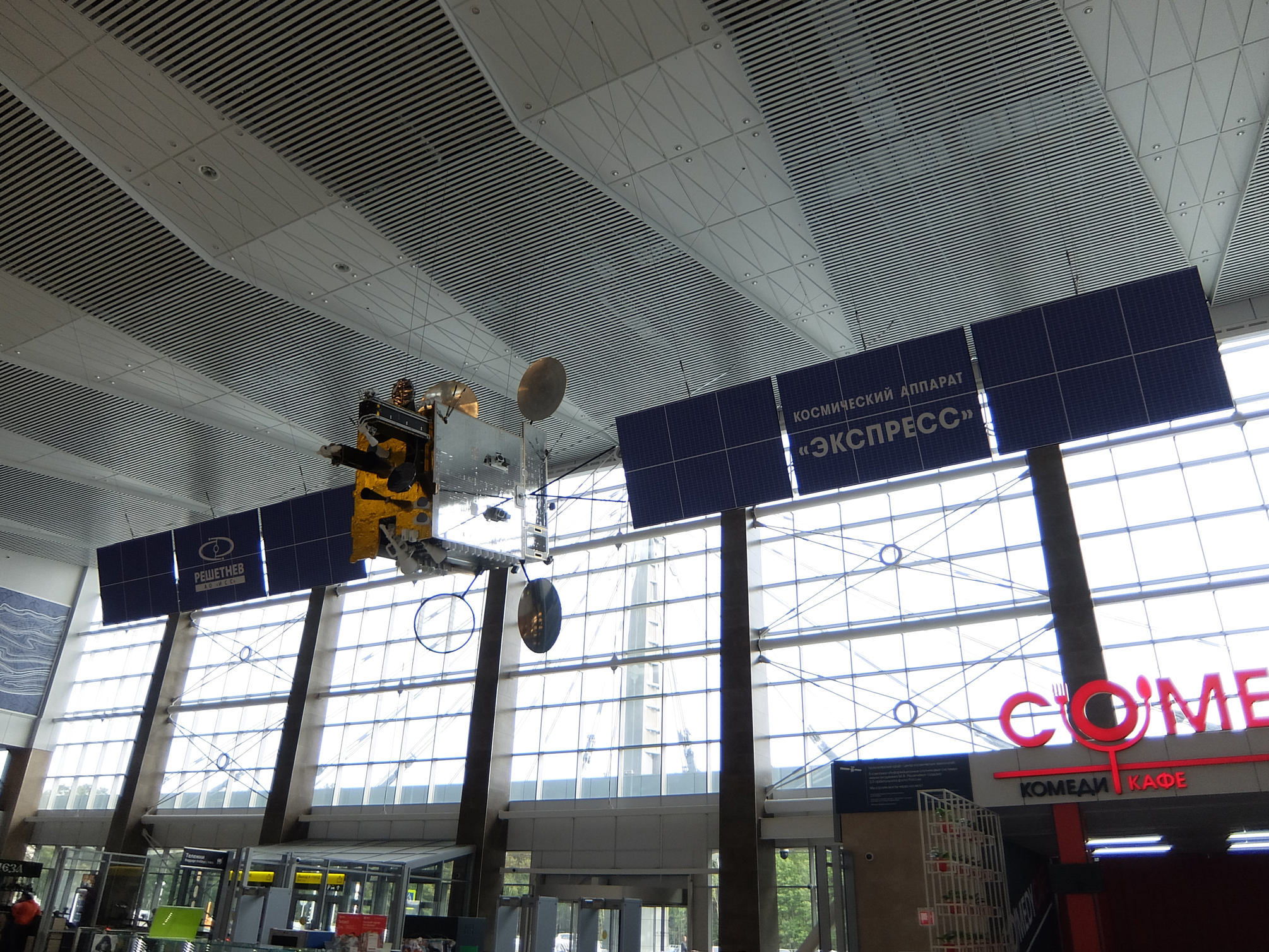
- Names: Экспресс-АМ8; Express-AM8
- Mission type: Communications
- Operator: RSCC Space Communications (RSCC)
- COSPAR ID: 2015-048A
- SATCAT no.: 40895
- Website: eng.rscc.ru
- Mission duration: 15 years (planned); 9 years, 6 months and 13 days (in progress)

Spacecraft properties
- Spacecraft: Ekspress-AM8
- Spacecraft type: Ekspress
- Bus: Ekspress-1000H
- Manufacturer: ISS Reshetnev (bus); Thales Alenia Space (payload)
- Launch mass: 2,100 kg (4,600 lb)
- Dry mass: 661 kg (1,457 lb)
- Power: 5.880 kW

Start of mission
- Launch date: 14 September 2015, 19:00:00 UTC
- Rocket: Proton-M / Blok DM-03
- Launch site: Baikonur, Site 81/24
- Contractor: Khrunichev State Research and Production Space Center
- Entered service: 1 December 2015

Orbital parameters
- Reference system: Geocentric orbit
- Regime: Geostationary orbit
- Longitude: 14° West (2015–present)

Transponders
- Band: 38 transponders: 24 C-band; 12 Ku-band; 2 L-band
- Coverage area: Russia, CIS

Ekspress-AM8 (Russian: Экспресс-АМ8 meaning Express-AM8) is a Russian communications satellite which was launched in 2015. Part of the Ekspress series of geostationary communications satellites, it is owned and operated by the RSCC Space Communications.

== Satellite description ==
Thales Alenia Space, constructed Ekspress-AM8 payload, and ISS Reshetnev constructed the satellite bus which was based on the Ekspress-1000NTB. The satellite has a mass of 2,100 kg (4,600 lb), provides 5.9 kilowatts to its payload, and a planned operational lifespan of 15 years. The satellite carried 62 transponders: 24 operating in the C-band of the electromagnetic spectrum, 12 in the Ku-band and 2 in the L-band.

== Mission ==
The satellite is designed to provide TV and radio broadcasting services, data transmission, multimedia services, telephony, and mobile communications.

== Launch ==
Ekspress-AM8 was originally to be launched in 2012 or 2013 into RSCC's 14° West longitude, but was delayed to 2015. It used a Proton-M / Blok DM-03 launch vehicle to be inserted directly into geostationary orbit.

== See also ==
- 2015 in spaceflight
