= KazSat-3 =

Kazakh communications satellite

- Names: ҚазСат-3; QazSat-3
- Mission type: Communications
- Operator: JSC KazSat
- COSPAR ID: 2014-023B
- SATCAT no.: 39728
- Website: http://www.rcsc.kz/Home/IndexEng
- Mission duration: 15 years (planned); 9 years, 4 months and 19 days (final)

Spacecraft properties
- Spacecraft: KazSat-3
- Spacecraft type: Ekspress
- Bus: Ekspress-1000NTV
- Manufacturer: ISS Reshetnev (bus); Thales Alenia Space (payload)
- Launch mass: 1,701 kg (3,750 lb)
- Power: 5.8 kW

Start of mission
- Launch date: 28 April 2014, 04:25:00 UTC
- Rocket: Proton-M / Briz-M
- Launch site: Baikonur, Site 81/24
- Contractor: Khrunichev State Research and Production Space Center
- Entered service: June 2014

End of mission
- Last contact: 16 September 2023

Orbital parameters
- Reference system: Geocentric orbit
- Regime: Geostationary orbit
- Longitude: 58.5° East

Transponders
- Band: 28 Ku-band
- Bandwidth: 36 and 54 MHz
- Coverage area: Kazakhstan

KazSat-3 (Kazakh: ҚазСат-3, QazSat-3) is a Kazakh telecommunications satellite. KazSat-3 is designed for services of telecommunications, television broadcasting and high-speed Internet access in Kazakhstan and neighboring countries.

According to Viktor Lefter, president of the Kazakh Republican Center for Space Communications, Kazsat-3 and its sister satellite KazSat-2 saved Kazakhstan ₸18 billion between 2013 and 2017.

== Mission ==
KazSat-3 was developed and produced by Russian satellite company ISS Reshetnev under a contract with the Republican Center for Space Communications (RCSC) within the project of creating a national telecommunications and broadcasting space system. The satellite cost US$148 million to construct and launch.

KazSat-3 was launched 28 April 2014 at 04:25:00 UTC from Cosmodrome Baikonur in Kazakhstan on a Proton-M launch vehicle.

Kazakhstan's national broadcast satellite television provider, Otau TV, announced in July 2016 that it would be using KazSat-3 instead of Intelsat 904 for all of its traffic.

On 31 March 2017, KazSat-3's sister satellite KazSat-2 experienced a seven-hour communications disruption. During the disruption, all traffic was handled by KazSat-3.

On 16 September 2023, KazSat-3 was temporarily reported lost due to a malfunction with its battery system. As a result, the satellite's mission duration was shortened to 9 years.

== Replacement ==
A new satellite, KazSat-3R, is planned to replace KazSat-3 as its service life is planned to end in 2029. US$22.3 million dollars has been allocated to the project.

== See also ==
- KazSat-1
- KazSat-2
