= Ekspress-AM6 =

Russian communications satellite

- Names: Экспресс-АМ6; Express-AM6; Eutelsat 53A
- Mission type: Communications
- Operator: Russian Satellite Communications Company (RSCC)
- COSPAR ID: 2014-064A
- SATCAT no.: 40277
- Website: eng.rscc.ru
- Mission duration: 15 years (planned); 11 years, 10 months and 1 day (in progress)

Spacecraft properties
- Spacecraft: Ekspress-AM6
- Spacecraft type: Ekspress
- Bus: Ekspress-2000
- Manufacturer: ISS Reshetnev (bus); MDA Corporation (payload)
- Launch mass: 3,358 kg (7,403 lb)
- Power: 14 kW

Start of mission
- Launch date: 21 October 2014, 15:09:32 UTC
- Rocket: Proton-M / Briz-M
- Launch site: Baikonur, Site 81/24
- Contractor: Khrunichev State Research and Production Space Center
- Entered service: May 2015

Orbital parameters
- Reference system: Geocentric orbit
- Regime: Geostationary orbit
- Longitude: 53° East (2014–present)

Transponders
- Band: 72 transponders: 14 C-band; 44 Ku-band; 12 Ka-band; 2 L-band
- Coverage area: Europe, Middle East, Russia, CIS

Ekspress-AM6 (Russian: Экспресс-АМ6 meaning Express-AM6) is a Russian communications satellite which was launched in 2014. The satellite has replaced the older Ekspress-AM22, at 53° East. Part of the Ekspress series of geostationary communications satellites, it is owned and operated by the Russian Satellite Communications Company (RSCC).

== Satellite description ==
The satellite has 14 C-band, 44 Ku-band, 12 Ka-band and 2 L-band transponders.

== Launch ==
The satellite was launched on a Proton-M / Briz-M launch vehicle from Baikonur Cosmodrome. The Briz-M upper stage shut down too early in the fourth burn and left the satellite in a lower than planned orbit. The satellite reached the operational geostationary orbit by using its own propulsion.

== List of providers ==
Company	Market	Website
Russian Satellite Communications Company (RSCC)	Russia and CIS	https://www.rscc.ru
Wide Network Solutions (WNS)	Europe and Middle East	https://www.widenetworks.net

== Eutelsat 53A ==
Five transponders are leased to Eutelsat and are marketed under the name Eutelsat 53A since May 2015.

== See also ==
- Ekspress
