= Heavy ICBM =

Class of ballistic missile

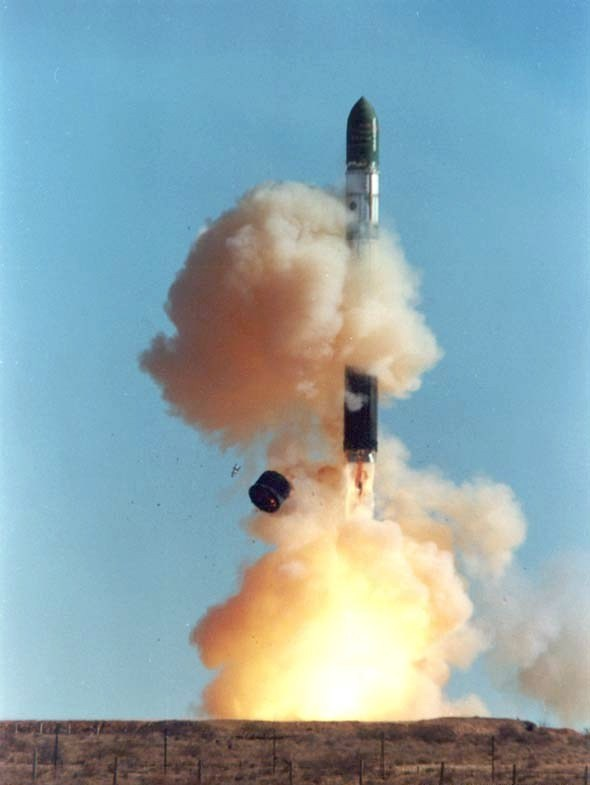
The R-36 Intercontinental Ballistic Missile

Heavy ICBM is a term that was created in the 1970s to describe a class of Soviet and Russian ICBMs (intercontinental ballistic missiles). They were characterized by a heavy throw-weight of 60 to 90 metric tons, several times that of an LGM-30 Minuteman, and a length of over 35 meters, and were thus capable of delivering a large number of warheads in a single MIRV missile.

This term usually refers to R-36 / "SS-9 Scarp", R-36M (SS-18) variants / "SS-18 Satan", and the RS-28 Sarmat missiles.

RS-28 Sarmat is called a "superheavy" ICBM. Superheavy ICBMs date back to the UR-500 which was designed to deliver the 50 megaton Tsar Bomba warhead. The UR-500 was developed into the Proton which successfully launched the first living beings to orbit the Moon and return safely, on Zond 5.

== Deliveries ==
The SS-9 was a silo-launched missile capable of delivering warheads of 5–18 megatons, with a range of up to 15,500 km. These were then replaced by the similar SS-18, with payloads of 18–25 megatons. The silos used for launching were the same for both, once modified.
