= Intelsat 23 =

Communications satellite

- Mission type: Communication
- Operator: Intelsat
- COSPAR ID: 2012-057A
- SATCAT no.: 38867
- Mission duration: 15 years

Spacecraft properties
- Bus: GEOStar-2
- Manufacturer: Orbital
- Launch mass: 2,700 kilograms (6,000 lb)

Start of mission
- Launch date: 14 October 2012, 08:37 UTC
- Rocket: Proton-M/Briz-M
- Launch site: Baikonur 81/24
- Contractor: ILS

Orbital parameters
- Reference system: Geocentric
- Regime: Geostationary
- Longitude: 53° W

Transponders
- Band: 24 C band 15 Ku band

Intelsat 23 is a communications satellite run by Intelsat which will provide communications services for the Americas, Western Europe and Africa. It is in a geosynchronous orbit located at 53° west and will replace Intelsat 707. It was built by Orbital Sciences and has a designed life of 15 years.

== Satellite ==
Intelsat 23 is one of a series of Intelsat communications satellites which are in geosynchronous orbit so that they are always located over the same part of the earth. It will be located over the equator at 53° west and is intended to replace Intelsat 707, which was launched in 1996.

The satellite was built by Orbital Sciences using their GEOstar-2 bus. It has 24 C band circular polarized transponders covering the Americas and Western Europe, and 15 linear polarized Ku band transponders covering Latin America. The satellite has 32 C band transponders and 19 Ku band transponders in total to provide for redundancy. Both antennae are 2.5m x 2.7m.

== Launch ==
Intelsat 23 was launched by International Launch Services on 14 October 2012. It was launched from Baikonur Cosmodrome launchpad 81/24 by a Proton-M rocket with a Briz-M upper stage. The Briz-M upper stage used was the Phase III type with two 80 litre fuel tanks. It was launched at 08:37 UTC, which is an unusual daytime launch for a Proton, and is intended to deliver the satellite to the correct orbit in nine and a half hours.

The first stage of the Proton burned for two minutes before being jettisoned. The second stage then burned for three and a half minutes. The third stage of the Proton burned for 4 minutes and 14 seconds delivering the satellite and the Briz-M upper stage into a sub-orbital trajectory. The Briz-M made four scheduled burns with coasting stages in between to transfer the satellite into circular orbit, then an intermediate orbit, then Geostationary transfer orbit before delivering it to the correct orbit.

The launch was the first Proton-M/Briz-M launch since the failed launch of Ekspress-MD2 and Telkom-3 on 6 August 2012. Those satellites were lost due to a problem with the Briz-M which did not complete the third burn due to a fuel problem.
