= Monitor-E =

Russian earth observation satellite

- Mission type: Earth observation
- Operator: NTs OMZ
- COSPAR ID: 2005-032A
- SATCAT no.: 28822
- Website: eng.ntsomz.ru/ks_dzz/satellites/monitor_E
- Mission duration: Planned: 5 years Final: 2 years, 4 months, 25 days

Spacecraft properties
- Bus: Yakhta
- Manufacturer: Khrunichev
- Launch mass: 750 kg (1,650 lb)
- Payload mass: 270 kg (600 lb)

Start of mission
- Launch date: 26 August 2005, 18:34 UTC
- Rocket: Rokot/Briz-KM
- Launch site: Plesetsk Site 133/3
- Contractor: Eurockot Launch Services

End of mission
- Disposal: Decommissioned
- Deactivated: 21 January 2008
- Decay date: 22 September 2020

Orbital parameters
- Reference system: Geocentric
- Regime: Sun-synchronous
- Eccentricity: 0.00145
- Perigee altitude: 524 km (326 mi)
- Apogee altitude: 544 km (338 mi)
- Inclination: 97.6°
- Period: 95.3 minutes
- Epoch: 26 August 2005, 14:34 UTC
Instruments
- PSA: Pnchromatic imager (Gamma-L)
- RDSA: Multispectral imager (Gamma-C)

Monitor-E was the first Russian satellite of a fleet of newly designed, small Earth observing satellites. It was launched 26 August 2005 at 18:34 UTC from Plesetsk Cosmodrome, and placed in a Sun-synchronous orbit of 524 by 544 km (326 by 338 mi).

The satellite was decommissioned 21 January 2008 and decayed from orbit 22 September 2020.

== Design ==
Monitor-E had a set of remote sensing devices. They were intended to make maps of the Earth's surface to be used for ecological monitoring and charting geological features. It was built by the Khrunichev State Research and Production Space Center.

A mock-up of Monitor-E (COSPAR 2003-031A) was launched 30 June 2003 aboard Rokot rocket.

=== Specifications ===
Sensors

- 8 m panchromatic (0.51-0.85 μm), swath width of not less 90 km
- 20–40 m multispectral (0.54-0.59/0.63-0.68/0.79-0.90 μm), swath width of not less than 160 km

Onboard storage

- 2 × 200 gigabit capacity

Data communications

- Transmission speeds of 15.36/61.44/122.88 Mbit/s

Orbit

- Altitude: 524 × 544 km (326 × 338 mi) - 97.6 degree Sun-synchronous inclination

Spacecraft

- Planned active life: 5 years
- Orientation precision: 0.1 degrees
- Stabilization precision: 0.001 degrees/s
- Average daily power consumption: 450 W
- Mass: 750 kg (1,650 lb)

== Communications problems ==
After launch, communications with Monitor-E was initially difficult to establish, but a few hours later it was successfully contacted and control was established. On 19 October 2005 new problems developed and no communication was possible since then. Later on communications were restored and photographs from both cameras were published on 30 November 2005.
