= Krasnoyarsk Machine-Building Plant =

Subsidiary of Roscosmos

JSC Krasnoyarsk Machine-Building Plant

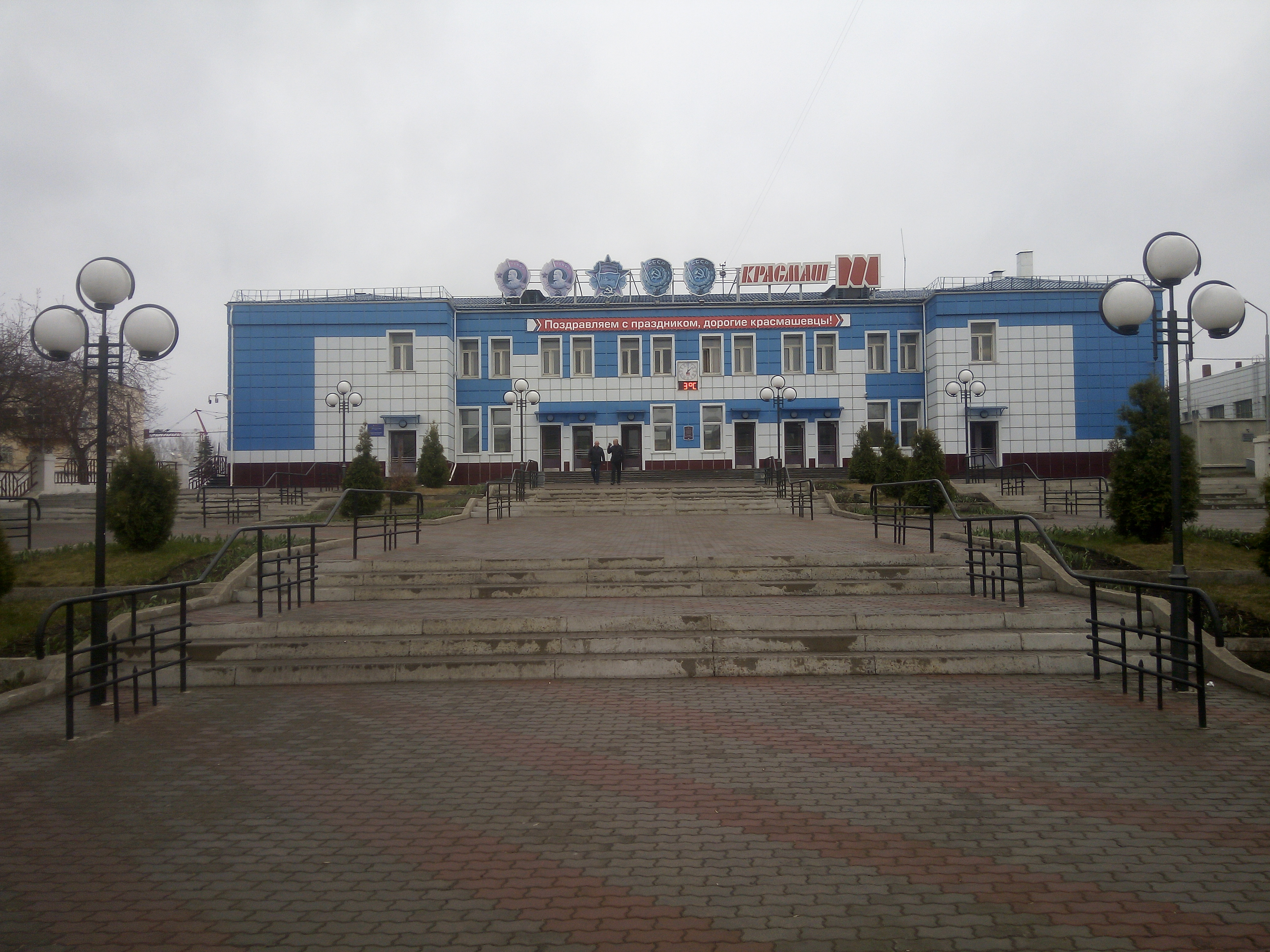
- Type: Joint-stock company
- Industry: Arms industry Aerospace industry Space industry
- Founded: 1932; 94 years ago
- Headquarters: Krasnoyarsk, Russia
- Area served: Russia
- Products: Ballistic missiles, Submarine-launched ballistic missiless, launch vehicles, expendable launch systems, refrigerators
- Net income: −19,854,000 Russian ruble (2017)
- Total assets: 44,466,598,000 Russian ruble (2017)
- Parent: Roscosmos
- Website: www.krasm.com

Krasnoyarsk Machine-Building Plant (stylized KrasMash) (Russian: Красноярский машиностроительный завод) is a Russian arms manufacturer and home appliance manufacturer based in Krasnoyarsk. It was established in 1932 and became a subsidiary of Roscosmos.

The Krasnoyarsk Machine-Building Plant was a leading producer of liquid propellant submarine-launched ballistic missiles in the USSR. It has also produced "Biryusa" refrigerators for many years and in the 1990s it converted to the production of a number of new civilian goods. The company also produced the torches for the 2014 Winter Olympics torch relay.

== History ==
The plant was founded on July 13, 1932, when the Charter of the State Administration for the Construction and Temporary Operation of the Krasnoyarsk Machine-Building Plant was adopted by order of the People's Commissariat of Heavy Industry. At that time, the plant produced dredges, steam boilers and excavators for gold mines.

During World War II, the plant was one of the manufacturers of guns of various systems for the Red Army (including automatic anti-aircraft 61-K ), mortars, large aerial bombs, and sea mines. In 1949, it started production of automatic anti-aircraft gun AZP S-60.

In 1959–1965 the plant was reconstructed to produce new rocket and space technology.

From 1958 to 1961, the plant produced civilian products such as drive axles for the SK-3 grain harvester, and since 1964, it has produced refrigerators under the Biryusa brand.

The plant is the main manufacturer of ballistic missiles the R-29RMU Sineva for submarines. In addition, it produces basic modules of the upper stage for the launch vehicles Zenit-2 and Proton.

Since the plant's founding, eleven workers were awarded the title of Hero of Socialist Labor, the highest level of distinction in the USSR.

From 1991, the plant produced civilian products, including growing polycrystalline silicon, manufacturing heat exchangers and boilers.

As part of the implementation of the 2016 State Defense Order, the plant started producing the R-29RMU Sineva ICBM.

== Products ==
- R-29RM Shtil
- R-29RMU Sineva
- R-29RMU2 Layner
- BZhRK Barguzin
- Blok D
- Blok DM-03
- RS-28 Sarmat
