= Syntin =

Names
- Preferred IUPAC name 2^{1}-Methyl-1^{1},2^{1}:2^{2},3^{1}-tercyclopropane
- Other names 1-Methyl-1,2-dicyclopropylcyclopropane; Sintin; Synthin; Tsycklin; Tsiklin

Identifiers
CAS Number	93223-46-2
3D model (JSmol)	Interactive image
ChemSpider	452765
PubChem CID	519050
CompTox Dashboard (EPA)	DTXSID90333879
- InChI: InChI=1S/C10H16/c1-10(8-4-5-8)6-9(10)7-2-3-7/h7-9H,2-6H2,1H3 Key: GTKAAVZEFUFXDD-UHFFFAOYSA-N; InChI=1/C10H16/c1-10(8-4-5-8)6-9(10)7-2-3-7/h7-9H,2-6H2,1H3 Key: GTKAAVZEFUFXDD-UHFFFAOYAR
- SMILES: CC1(C2CC2)C(C3CC3)C1

Properties
Chemical formula	C_{10}H_{16}
Molar mass	136.238 g·mol^{−1}
Density	0.851 g/mL
Boiling point	158 °C (316 °F; 431 K)
- Except where otherwise noted, data are given for materials in their standard state (at 25 °C [77 °F], 100 kPa). verify (what is ?) Infobox references

Syntin is a hydrocarbon with the molecular formula C_{10}H_{16} used as a rocket fuel. It is a mixture of four stereoisomers (see below). It has a density of 0.851 g/mL and a boiling point of 158 °C. Due to the presence of three strained cyclopropane rings, the molecule has a highly positive enthalpy of formation: Δ_{f}H°(l) = 133 kJ/mol (980 kJ/kg, the average value for the isomeric mixture), bringing additional energy into the combustion process. It has advantages over the traditional hydrocarbon fuels, such as RP-1, due to higher density, lower viscosity, and higher specific heat of oxidation.

Syntin was used in the Soviet Union and later Russia as fuel for the Soyuz-U2 rocket from 1982 until 1995.

It was first synthesized in the USSR in 1959 and brought to mass production in the 1970s. It was prepared in a multi-step synthetic process from easily obtained acetylcyclopropane (the 3rd molecule):

Syntin synthesis 01

After dissolution of the USSR, the production of this fuel was halted due to the expense of the synthesis. On September 3, 1995, Soyuz TM-22, the seventy-first and last Soyuz-U2 rocket launched, being the last rocket fueled with Syntin.

== Stereoisomers ==
Syntin has two stereocenters at the central cyclopropane ring. Thus, four stereoisomers exist:

Four Syntin Stereoisomers

In practice, syntin is used as a racemic mixture (a mixture where all stereoisomers are present in equal amounts).

== See also ==
- Dicyclopentadiene

== Literature ==
- A. P. Mesheheryakov, V. G. Glukhovtsev, A. D. Petrov, "Synthesis of 1-methyl-1,2-dicyclopropylcyclopropane", Doklady Akademii Nauk SSSR, 1960, 130, 779–81.
- Yu. P. Semenov, B. A. Sokolov, S. P. Chernykh, A. A. Grigor'ev, O. M. Nefedov, N. N. Istomin, G. M. Shirshov, "Multiple strained-ring alkane as high-performance liquid rocket fuel", RU 2233385, C2 20040727.
- T. Edwards, "Liquid Fuels and Propellants for Aerospace Propulsion: 1903-2003", Journal of Propulsion and Power, 2003, 19(6), 1089–1107. doi:10.2514/2.6946
- V. Azov, D. Vorontsov, "The last battle of hydrocarbons?", Novosti Kosmonavtiki, 2008, 18, No. 2 (301), 44–46.
