= Blok D =

Rocket stage used on Soviet and later Russian expendable launch systems

Block D
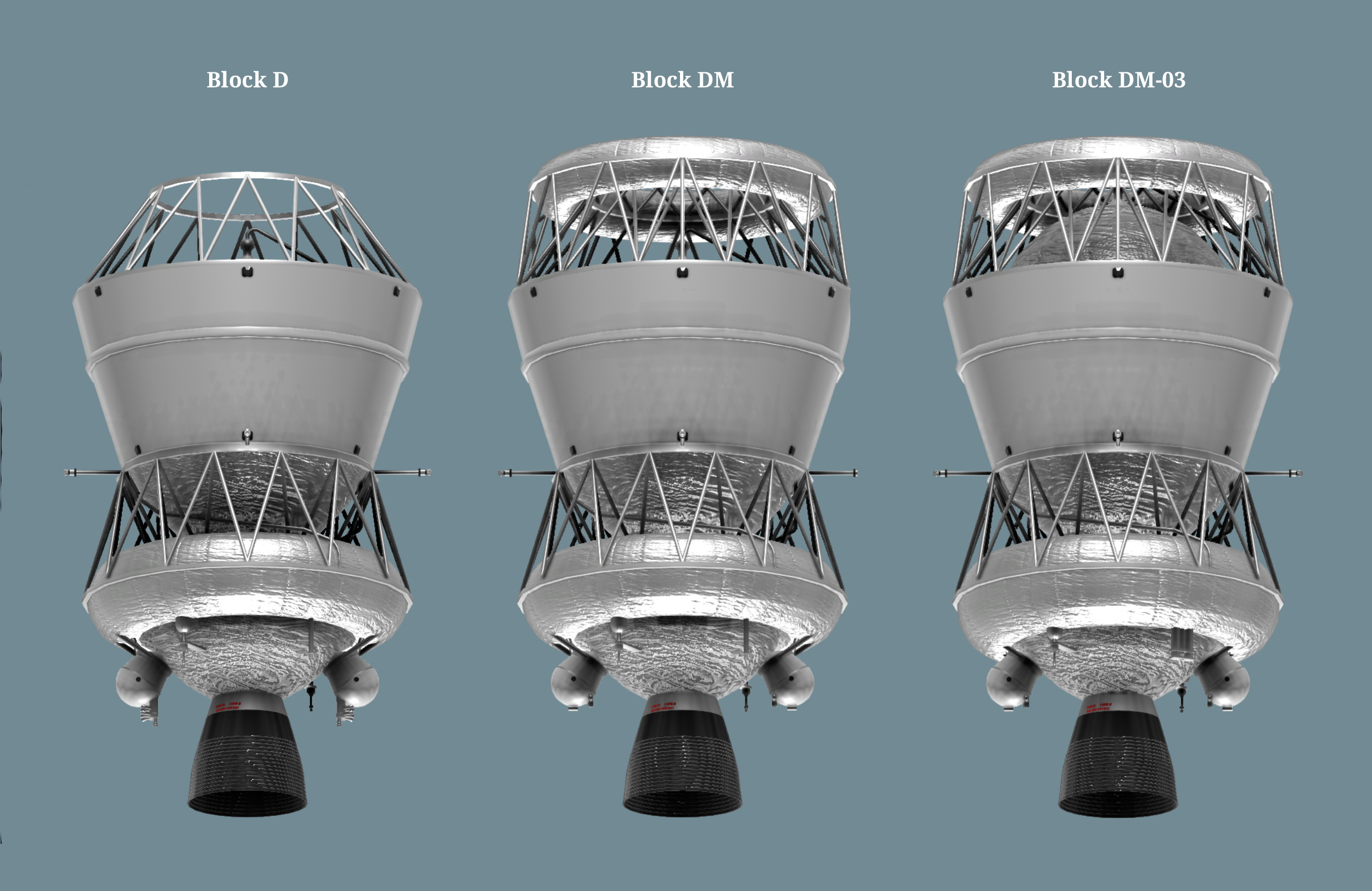
- Comparison of Block D variants
- Country of origin: Soviet Union
- Used on: N-1; Proton; Zenit

General characteristics
- Height: 6.28 m (20 ft 7 in)
- Diameter: 3.70 m (12 ft 2 in)
- Gross mass: 17,360 kg (38,270 lb)
- Propellant mass: 15,220 kg (33,550 lb)
- Empty mass: 2,140 kg (4,720 lb)

Associated stages
- Derivatives: Blok DM-03
- Comparable: Briz-M

Launch history
- Status: Retired
- Total launches: 66
- First flight: 26 March 1974
- Last flight: 6 May 1988

Blok DM
- Powered by: 1 × RD-58M
- Maximum thrust: 83.61 kN (18,800 lb_{f})
- Specific impulse: 363.5 s (3.565 km/s)
- Burn time: 630 seconds
- Propellant: RP-1/LOX

Blok D (Russian: Блок Д, lit. 'Block D') is an upper stage used on Soviet and later Russian expendable launch systems, including the N1, Proton-K and Zenit.

The stage (and its derivatives) has been included in more than 320 launched rockets as of 2015. By 2002 its modification Blok DM had a 97% success rate in 218 flights since 1974, and 43 successful missions in 1997–2002.

The stage was developed in the 1960s as the fifth stage ('Д' is the fifth letter in the Cyrillic alphabet) for the powerful N1 rocket used in the Soviet crewed lunar programs. The stage first flew in March 1967 while testing the Zond spacecraft as a part of those programs. During crewed lunar flight Blok D would be used for mid-course corrections on the flight to the Moon, then to place the lunar orbiter and lander into a lunar orbit, and decelerate moon-lander out onto its landing trajectory.

Blok D was also included as fourth stage of Proton-K and as such flew on uncrewed Soviet missions to Moon, Mars (Mars 3) and Venus. It was used in the Proton-K configuration of the rocket and is still in use in the newer Proton-M variant (along with the Briz-M).

Blok DM also flies as the third stage for the Zenit-3SL rocket, which is used by the Sea Launch project to launch geostationary satellites. In 2002 a Blok DM3 failed in the attempted launch of Astra 1K.

The stage uses liquid oxygen (LOX) and kerosene as propellants, and has one single-chamber RD-58 main engine. The LOX tank has a spherical shape; the kerosene tank is toroidal, inclined to 15 degrees for better fuel extraction, with the engine mounted in the center of torus. Tanks include the first pump stage for the engine; the main pump is mounted on the engine.

Blok D weighs 3.5 tons during liftoff, but some parts are jettisoned and the dry mass in space is 2.5 tons. It has 5.70 meters length and generates 83.300 kN thrust for 600 seconds burn time. Blok D was modified as Blok DM in 1974, with 11D-58S engine. The unit cost is $4 million.

As of the early 1990s, the ullage rockets discarded just before the final burns by Block DM fourth stages on Proton launches constituted the largest single group of soviet propulsion systems to have suffered disintegrations contributing to space debris.

Since 1990, all variations of this stage have been built in the Krasnoyarsk Machine-Building Plant.

== Modifications ==
RKK Energia, the company that created Blok D, used it as a platform for many modifications over many years for different purposes; for example, the main propulsion unit on Buran started as a modification of the Blok D.

=== Variants ===
Variant	First flight	Last flight	Launches	Rockets	Remarks
Blok D	1967	1976	44	Proton-K; N1	
Blok D-1	1978	1989	10	Proton-K	Mostly used for launches to Venus
Blok D-2	1988	1996	3	Proton-K	Launched Fobos 1, Fobos 2 and Mars 96
Blok DM	1974	1990	66	Proton-K; Energia (unflown)	Blok D modification for Earth-based orbits
Blok DM-2	1982	2012	115	Proton-K; Proton-M	Used with Proton-M for GLONASS launches
Blok DM-2M	1994	2005	15	Proton-K	Enhanced payload thanks to the use of higher performance Syntin fuel instead of RG-1. Powered by the RD-58S engine.
Blok DM-5	1997	2002	2	Proton-K	Used for low Earth orbit launches with Araks satellites
Blok DM1	1996	1996	1	Proton-K	Commercial Blok DM-2, only used for one launch, with Inmarsat-3 F2
Blok DM2	1997	2002	4	Proton-K	Commercial Blok DM-5, used for Iridium and INTEGRAL launches
Blok DM3	1996	2006	25	Proton-K	Commercial Blok DM-2M
Blok DM4	1997	1997	1	Proton-K	Commercial Blok DM-2M, only used to launch Telstar 5
Blok DM-SL	1999	2014	36	Zenit-3SL	Used in Sea Launch missions, some flights use a version with stretched fuel tanks
Blok DM-SLB	2008	2013	5	Zenit-3SLB	Used in Land Launch missions and other commercial Zenit-3SLB flights from Baikonur
Blok DM-03	2010	active	4	Proton-M	Intended as a replacement for Blok DM-2 and DM-SL/SLB, first flew in 2010, only used on Proton
14S48 Persei / Orion	2021	active	1	Angara A5	Modification of 11S861-03 (DM-03) for Angara A5
References					

== See also ==
- Blok DM-03 – Advanced version of this stage.
- N-1 – original launch vehicle for which this stage was developed.
- Proton – launch vehicle that has flown the most with this stage.
- Zenit-3 – launch vehicle that uses this stage.
- Angara A5 – launch vehicle that will use this stage when launched from Vostochny Cosmodrome
