= Ekspress-AM4 =

Russian communications satellite

- Names: Express-AM4
- Mission type: Communications
- Operator: Russian Satellite Communications Company (RSCC)
- COSPAR ID: 2011-045A
- SATCAT no.: 37798
- Website: https://eng.rscc.ru/
- Mission duration: 15 years (planned); Failed on orbit

Spacecraft properties
- Spacecraft: Ekspress-AM4
- Spacecraft type: Ekspress
- Bus: EADS Astrium
- Manufacturer: Eurostar-3000
- Launch mass: 5,775 kg (12,732 lb)
- Power: 14 kW

Start of mission
- Launch date: 17 August 2011, 21:25:01 UTC
- Rocket: Proton-M / Briz-M
- Launch site: Baikonur, Site 200/39
- Contractor: Khrunichev State Research and Production Space Center

End of mission
- Disposal: Deorbited
- Decay date: 28 March 2012

Orbital parameters
- Reference system: Geocentric orbit
- Regime: Medium Earth orbit Geostationary orbit (planned)
- Longitude: 80° East (planned)
- Perigee altitude: 695 km (432 mi)
- Apogee altitude: 20,239 km (12,576 mi)
- Inclination: 51.1°
- Period: 6.04 hours

Transponders
- Band: 63 transponders: 30 C-band, 28 Ku-band, 2 Ka-band, 3 L-band
- Coverage area: Russia

Ekspress-AM4 was a Russian communications satellite placed into the wrong orbit from a faulty Briz-M rocket stage. This satellite was to be part of the Ekspress series of geostationary communications satellites owned by Russian Satellite Communications Company (RSCC). Proposals were made to reposition the satellite to provide broadband services to Antarctica, but ultimately the decision was made to de-orbit the satellite. On 28 March 2012, the satellite splashed into the Pacific Ocean.

== Satellite description ==
The total mass of the Ekspress-AM4 satellite was 5,775 kg (12,732 lb), and the satellite had 63 transponders. The onboard antennas were capable of broadcasting in the C-band, Ku-band, L-band, and Ka-band. The satellite's orbit was measured at 695 by 20239 km altitude, with an inclination orbit of 51.1°. Though the satellite was placed in the wrong orbit, there was no damage to the satellite, meaning that it became the subject of numerous reuse proposals.

== Launch ==
The Ekspress-AM4 satellite was launched on 17 August 2011 on a Russian Proton-M launch vehicle from Kazakhstan, which included a Briz-M upper stage. It was just after launch that the Briz-M stage did not separate from the Ekspress satellite, causing it to be placed into the wrong orbit. Contact was lost with the satellite and with its attached Briz M upper stage about six hours after the pair were launched. Telemetry stopped either during or after the fourth of five planned Briz M upper stage burns planned to occur during a nine-hour maneuver designed to insert the satellite into a geosynchronous transfer orbit (GTO).

== Reuse proposals ==
One of the most notable reuse proposals came from a company called Polar Broadband Systems, which was established in December 2011. Its objectives were to submit proposals for the reuse of semi-retired and retired satellites for use with communications over the Antarctic. The company notes that it would not have been feasible to build a dedicated satellite for the region as the population would not justify the expense, however Ekspress-AM4 would suffice as it could have been maneuvered into the required orbit. There was enough fuel on board for it to be operational for ten years, with giving the Antarctic region 16 hours of broadband access a day. Similarly, Australian company Antarctic Broadband proposed a similar scheme for Antarctic communications, however neither were successful.

== Deorbited ==
Dennis Pivnyuk, chief financial officer of the Russian Satellite Communications Company, informed on 15 March 2012 that the satellite would be decommissioned and deorbited. He stated that the descent phase would start on 20 March 2012, with the spacecraft reentering over the Pacific Ocean around 26 March 2012. The spacecraft was destroyed during reentry on 28 March 2012.
