= Turkmenistan Memorial Capsule =

Memorial satellite launched in 2005

- Mission type: Memorial Satellite
- COSPAR ID: 2005-031C
- SATCAT no.: 28811
- Mission duration: 20 years, 10 months, 1 day (in orbit)

Start of mission
- Launch date: 23 August 2005, 21:10 UTC
- Rocket: Dnepr
- Launch site: Baikonur Pad 109/95
- Contractor: ISC Kosmotras

Orbital parameters
- Reference system: Geocentric
- Regime: Low Earth
- Semi-major axis: 7,268 km (4,516 mi)
- Periapsis altitude: 602.1 km (374.1 mi)
- Apoapsis altitude: 1,193.3 km (741.5 mi)
- Inclination: 97.8 °
- Period: 102.8 min

The Turkmenistan Memorial Capsule (TMC for short, also known as SL-24 R/B) is a memorial satellite which was launched into a Sun-synchronous orbit in 2005 by a Ukrainian Dnepr rocket, alongside OICETS and Reimei. The first Turkmen satellite has been described as a "remarkable oddity" among non-scientific satellites.

The capsule is bolted to the Dnepr 3rd stage and it contains a flag of Turkmenistan and the book of Ruhnama.
