= Hodoyoshi 1 =

Japanese microsatellite

- Mission type: Remote sensing
- COSPAR ID: 2014-070B
- SATCAT no.: 40299

Spacecraft properties
- Launch mass: 60 kg (130 lb)
- Dimensions: 503 mm (19.8 in) × 524 mm (20.6 in) × 524 mm (20.6 in)
- Power: 50 W

Start of mission
- Launch date: 07:35:48, November 6, 2014 (UTC)
- Rocket: Dnepr
- Launch site: Dombarovsky
- Contractor: ISC Kosmotras
Instruments
- Optical push-broom imaging CCD sensor

Hodoyoshi 1 is a Japanese 60 kg-class microsatellite. It was launched on 6 November 2014 by a Dnepr rocket into the 500 km Sun-synchronous orbit along with Asnaro-1 and other microsatellites.

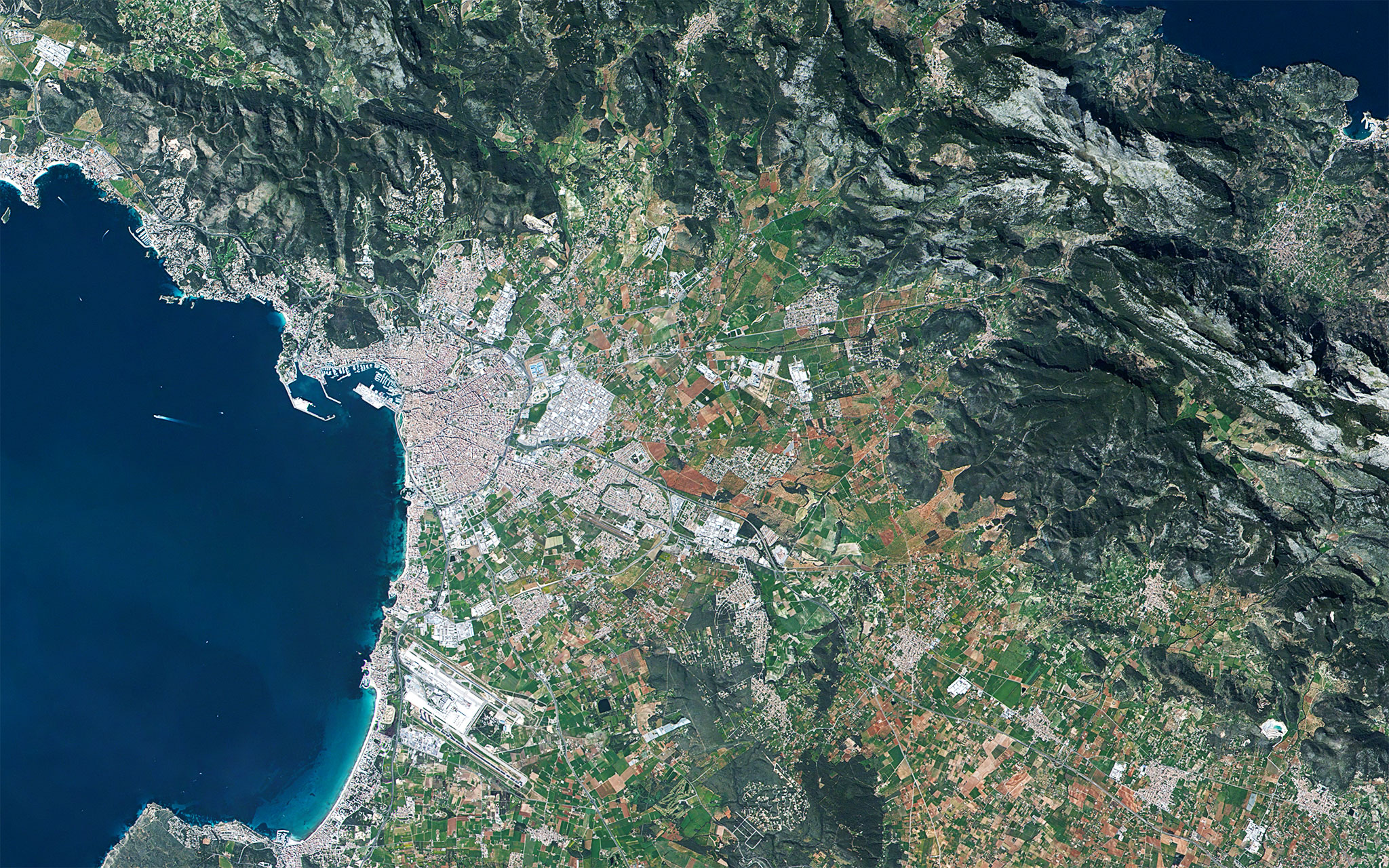
Image of Spain taken by Hodoyoshi 1.

== See also ==
- Hodoyoshi 3
- Hodoyoshi 4
