= OPTOS =

Spanish nanosatellite

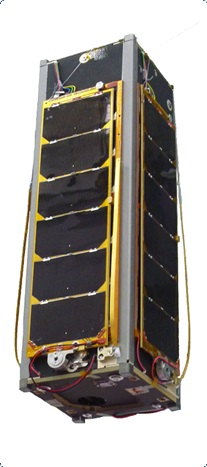
- The satellite in its launch configuration
- Mission type: Technology demonstration, scientific experimentation.
- Operator: INTA
- COSPAR ID: 2013-066E
- SATCAT no.: 39420
- Mission duration: 3 years

Spacecraft properties
- Manufacturer: INTA
- Dry mass: 3.8 kg
- Dimensions: 10 x 10 x 34.5 cm
- Power: 7.2 W

Start of mission
- Launch date: 21 November 2013
- Rocket: Dnepr
- Launch site: Dombarovsky

End of mission
- Last contact: 17 December 2017

Payload
- APIS, FIBOS, GMR, ODM

OPTOS was a Spanish nanosatellite designed and developed by INTA with support from the European Cooperation for Space Standardization (ECSS) as a low-cost technology demonstrator. It was launched in 2013 and had a service life of three years.

== Mission ==
OPTOS was devised as a testing platform to the national capabilities to produce an operating satellite with a limited developing time and budget (around 1.5 million euros). These requirements intended to grant easy access to space to both the Spanish scientific community and private business. Special attention was put on safety and ground testing prior to launch, consequently the satellite was qualified by both the ECSS, belonging to ESA, and INTA using its purpose-build Mission Simulation Test.

In addition, the satellite carried four scientific experiments:

- APIS (Athermalized Panchromatic Image Sensor), during its early development it was also known as OPTOCAMERA
- FIBOS (Fiber Bragg Gratings for Optical Sensing)
- GMR (Giant Magneto-Resistance) system, sometimes referred to as GMR-S (Giant Magneto-Resistance Sensor/System)
- ODM (OPTOS Dose Monitoring) system, during its early development it was also known as OPTORAD

The satellite also made heavy use of experimental technologies in order to test their viability in space. Some examples are a distributed OBDH (On-Board Data Handling) subsystem, complex programmable logic devices (CPLDs), and an optical wireless communication subsystem (OBCom) with a reduced Controller Area Network. Although OPTOS had an intended service life of 1 year, most of its subsystems remained operational for more than 3 years.

== Body ==
The body of the satellite was conformed by stacking three CubeSats in 3U configuration creating a square-base prism 10 cm x 10 cm x 34.5 cm. To save weight the structure was composed of an aluminum casing, provided by Pumkin Inc. and an internal carbon fibers structure developed by INTA, as a result the final weight of the satellite was 3.8 kg putting it into the picosatellite category. The four lateral faces were covered by solar panels to provide power while in orbit, additionally, two of them could deploy wingled panels to double their surface.

Internally, the satellite contained several subsystems developed by INTA. Some of them were:

=== Attitude Determination and Control Subsystem ===
This subsystem was responsible of accurately measuring and correcting the position of the satellite while in orbit. Its attitude was determined by two TNO Sun sensors attached to the -Y and -Z faces, sharing data about the direction and intensity of the sunlight received, these sensors could determine the Sun's position with as high as 2º of error. The position in relation to Earth was measured by a 3-axis fluxgate magnetometer which would act as a high precision compass. The device was based on a heavily modified Honeywell Aerospace HMC-1043. An additional Sun sensor was located on the +Z face to act as a watchdog timer to both the Attitude Determination units and the APIS experiment.

The actuators were provided by Astro und Feinwerktechnik Adlershof GmbH and consisted on a set of reaction wheels. 5 additional magnetorquers provided by AAC Clyde Space were located on all but one of the satellite's vertex embedded on the PCB belonging to the solar panels in order to save weight. The whole control unit was programmed by SENER and would provide freedom of rotation with continuous torque control and the capacity to stabilize the aircraft on its 3 axis. The magnetorquers were also used to transition between operational modes and help desaturate the reaction wheels if needed.

=== Electrical Power Subsystem ===
All the solar panels were GaAs deployed on a string 6 cells long and 4 cell wide. In operational conditions they would provide 7.2 W of power EOL which would be stored and used to power the satellite. Before its use, the electricity would be stored on a lithium-ion battery which was itself connected to a charge regulation board, designed by AAC Clyde Space, operating as a power supply capable of providing 3-6 V of regulated voltage and up to 12 V unregulated. Each subsystem was also connected to DC/DC converters to ensure adequate power levels.

=== On-Board Communications Subsystem ===
The OBCom was largely based on the OWLS system (also developed by INTA and used on earlier satellites such as the Nanosat-01). Hence it employed diffused infrared beams for internal communication and a wireless Controller Area Network (CAN) TM/TC main bus. By default the CAN bus provided sixteen configurable output lines which could be used as discrete outputs or clocks, three analog channels and a 1o bit analog-digical converting unit.

The use of infrared communication minimized wiring and thus saving both space and weight while providing higher transmission speeds. Each subsystem had its own independent OBCom module, based on complex programmable logic devices (CPLD) working on a short CAN communications protocol compatible with all ESA spacecraft. Each emitter consists on two SFH4205 working in parallel while the receivers are two IR-filtered TEMD5110 photodiodes.

=== On-Board Data Handling Subsystem ===
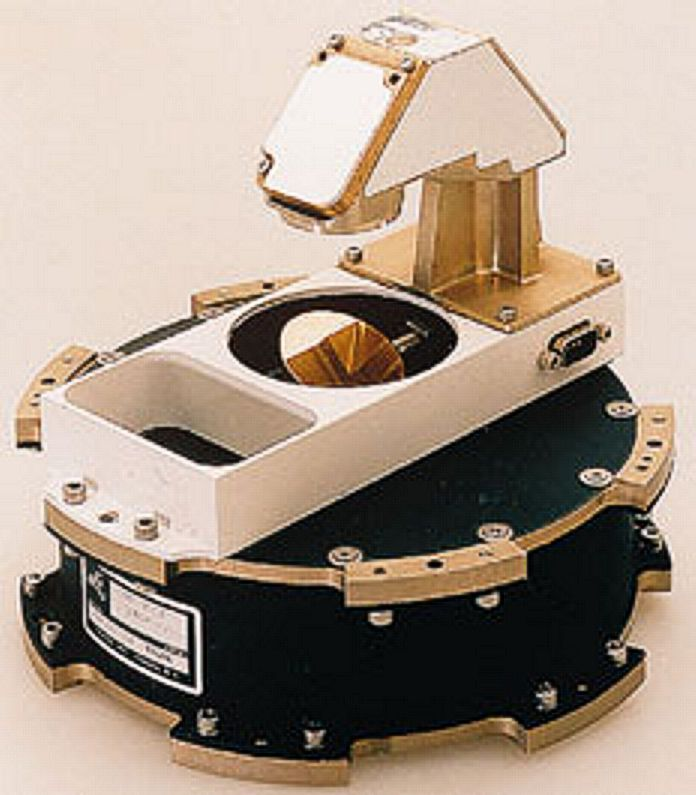
Set of T-SCANWHEEL reaction wheels.

The OBDH subsystem was in charge of gathering and processing all the data collected by the different modules of the satellite, hence it worked closely linked to the OBCom sharing both hardware and software while maintaining some degree of redundancy in case of system failure. This allowed a very compact design (25 mm x 15 mm x 14 mm), lightweight (total weight of 8 grams), and low power consumption (less than 50 mW).

The heart of the OBDH was its CPU which was based on MicroBlaze architecture and offered compatibility with CAN bus networks thanks to CPLD/FPGA protocols and high-level operating interfaces. The later can be classified into two groups according to operation:

- Enhanced Processing Unit (EPH): based on the Xilinx Virtex-II Pro, the EPH provided a general interface to the different subsystem through the CAN bus and directly monitors and contains the code from both the ACDS and the TTC. It was capable of receiving and acting on status information directly from the modules (mainly TM frames).
- Distributed OBDH Terminal (DOT): similar in operation to the CPLD Cool Runner II, the DOT acted as a common interface between the CPU and the different experiments. In addition to receiving and storing data, the DOT was also capable of transmitting instructions and commands from ground control through the communications module.

Both modes worked simultaneously to ensure the integration and interoperability of all the subsystems and an adequate communication speed (up to 125 kbit/s).

=== Thermal Control Subsystem ===
The TCS only operates passively and consists on several covers of Multi-Layered Insulation and insulating paint around modules and the frame. In addition, each subsystem has its own thermocouple which measures its temperature and shares it with the central processing unit.

=== RF Communications Subsystem ===
Near the upper square face were located four deployable monopolar omnidirectional antennas with circular polarization. In addition the subsystem had an advanced half-duplex transponder and Terminal Node Controller (TNC). These operated on the UHF band (435 MHz) and allowed speeds of 4 kbit/s uplink, using data subcarrier (PM/PBSK), and 5 kbit/s downlink, using Manchester pulses (SP-L) modular between 3 and 10 kbit/s.

The whole subsystem was produced by Thales Alenia Space España S.A. using ESA protocols such as ECSS-E-70-41A for ground communication, control and telemetry.

== Launch ==
The satellite was launched on 21 November 2013 by ISC Kosmotras from Yasny launch base in Dombarovsky, Russia. The launching rocket was a Dnepr carrying thirty two satellites (the main payload comprise the DubaiSat-2 and the STSat-3). OPTOS was successfully put on a Sun-synchronous near-circular orbit of 600 km of altitude, an inclination of 97.8º and a LTDN (Local Time on Descending Node) of 10:30 hours.

During its operating life the satellite was supervised by INTA from El Arenosillo until the last contact, made on 17 December 2017.

== Experiments ==
Resistor model of spin-valve giant magnetoresistance effect with overlapping ferromagnetic (blue) and non-magneti (orange) materials.

=== Pre-launch tests ===
Before the satellite was completed, INTA began developing a parallel project called the Mission Simulation Test (MST) with the intention of using it as proving grounds to test and observe the spacecraft and its subsystems. The MST was capable of simulating different orbital conditions such as eclipses, electromagnetic interferences and temporal signal losses in addition to physical test (vacuum, vibrations, temperature regulation...). After its success, the MST was further developed into the SIMSAR to test SAR systems deployed from space, being used during the development of both the Paz and SEOSat-Ingenio.

When the prototype was completed in early 2013, several payload test were performed using the MST. During those experiments the satellite was remotely supervised by ground control by RF under mission conditions. These test would prove critical to the success of the spacecraft as they allowed to discover several deficiencies in the design, particularly poor efficiency of the voltage operating levels and the malfunction of the power source regulators. Overcoming these defects would prove difficult and require corrections on the flight configuration and the deployment of the solar panels, specially given the limitation imposed by the ISOPOD launching device. Between payload tests the integrity of the satellite was routinely checked to ensure its behavior. The last test was performed in Yasny Cosmodrome just before its integration to the rocket.

=== APIS ===
The Athermalized Panchromatic Image Sensor was a CMOS camera developed to study image gathering and lens degradation in space. This was to be accomplished by taking several pictures of the same regions under similar light conditions and study the differences in image quality and color. The camera lens was refractive and protected from stray light by a set of baffles. It was responsible for redirecting the light to the focal plane where, using bidimensional arrays of CMOS-based photocells, would produce the images. The photocells had a maximum resolution of 1.3 megapixels (6.7 μm per pixel), however when operating the ROIC (Readout Integrated Circuit) at high speeds only 0.65 pixels were attainable. The focal plane was 4.3 x 3.2 mm.

The APIS was athermalized and initially could provide quality images in a temperature range of ±20 degrees Celsius. To maintain focus at different environmental temperatures, its lenses were spaced and reinforced with high refractory materials. Additionally, the camera had different modes and could be used for snapshots or be programmed from ground control. Its total weight was 120 grams.

=== FIBOS ===
The Fiber Bragg Gratings for Optical Sensing was a device developed to study the behavior and wavelength variation experienced by laser beams when crossing Fiber Bragg gratings at different temperatures. These variations would later be treated in the Processing Unit in order to find an accurate correlation between wavelength variation and temperature. The results obtained would be compared to the thermocouples in the TCS to assess the validity of the measurements. To minimize interference, two gratings were welded on steel cantilever supports on opposing ends of the satellite, both sharing an integrated Processing Unit and light source. The later being a pigtailed tunable laser regulated by the independent Input Control (DOT). The receiver was a PIN InGaAs photodiode (EPM605 developed by JDSU).

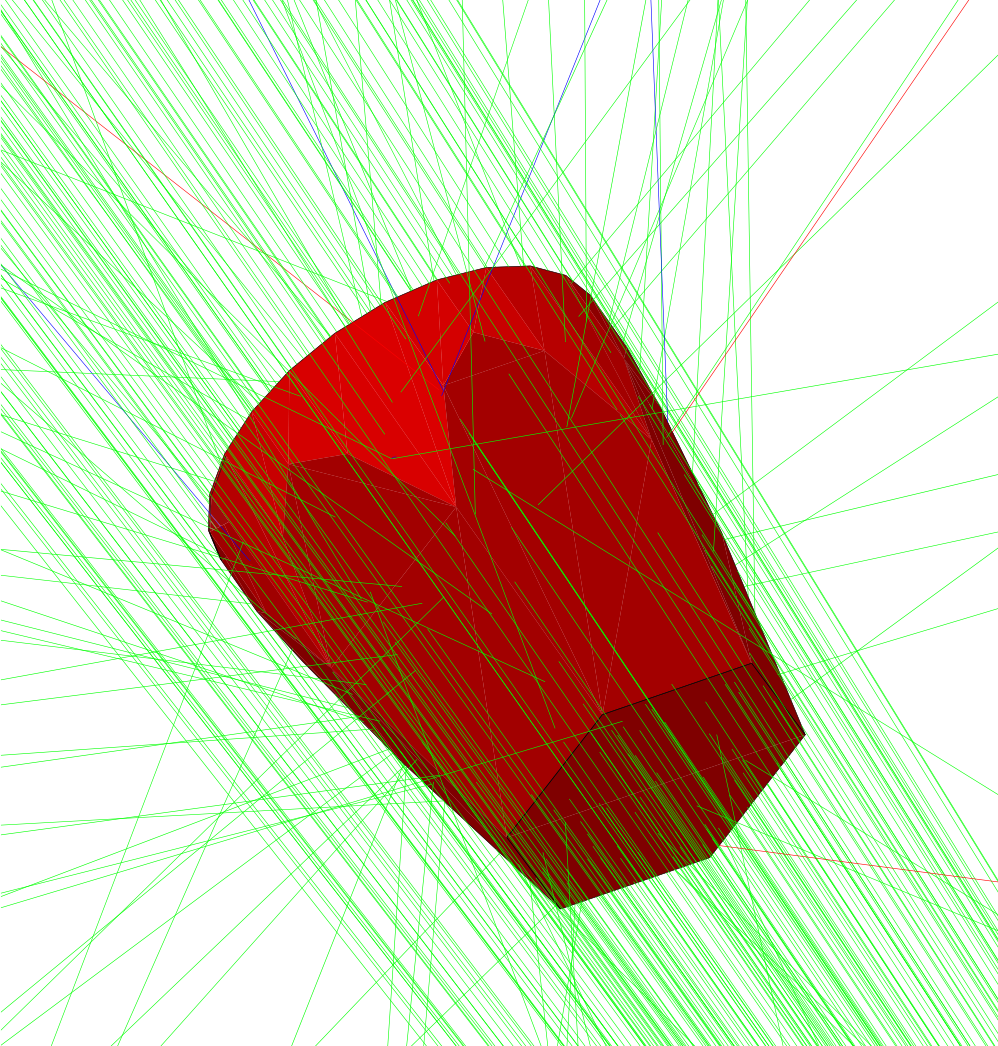
Simulation of a narrow beam of gamma radiation (green) impacting on an AGATA-detector (red) using Geant4.

The final assembly was 79 mm x 69 mm x 15 mm in size, with a total mass of less than 120 g, and a mean power consumption of 1.5 W.

=== GMR ===
The Giant Magneto-Resistor Sensor was an experimental magnetometer employed to measure the Earth's magnetic fluxes around the upper atmosphere. The system was based on the magnetoresistance effect: the variation in the electric resistance of some materials when a directional magnetic field is applied. Consequently, the device was composed of a superposition of alternating layers of ferromagnetic and amagnetic materials forming a sandwich structure. In addition, each ferromagnetic layer is originally magnetized in an opposing direction to the next, so in absence of an external magnetic field the electric resistance of the GMR is very high (>1kOhm). In contrast, when an external magnetic field is applied perpendicularly, the magnetized layers turn in the direction of the external field reducing its electric resistance.

The GMR was allocated near the sides of the satellite, sharing its circuits with other subsystems in order to save weight. Aside from the experiments, the materials conforming the GMR were also tested for future space usage.

=== ODM ===
The OPTOS Dose Monitoring was a radiation dosimeter developed to measure the incidence of cosmic rays in the upper atmosphere. The system had two independent on-board subassemblies each with its own RadFET capable of absorbing and measuring the incidence of ionizing radiation and radioactive particles along with a thermistor responsible for measurement the temperature of the environment. The radiation levels, along with the temperature, would be measured periodically every 10 minutes. Both subassemblies would be allocated on opposing ends of the satellite in order to compare the influence of the geometry and position to the radiation influx.

The data gathered would be sent back to Earth and compared to the theoretical values obtained with both the Geant4 and the SHIELDOSE CAD models and other standard particle flux simulations, such as AP8 and AE8. From the comparison, a TID (Total Ionizing Dose) deviation factor would be obtained and applied to future missions. In addition, it would also help INTA build up expertise when managing radiation sensors.

== See also ==
- Nanosat 01
- Nanosat-1B
