= Nanosat-1B =

Spanish research and communications satellite

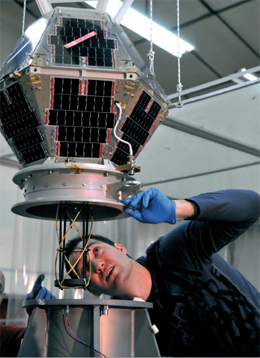
- A technician is checking a satellite (27 March 2009).
- Mission type: Research and Communications
- Operator: INTA
- COSPAR ID: 2009-041E
- SATCAT no.: 35685

Spacecraft properties
- Bus: Nanosat-01
- Manufacturer: Universidad de Sevilla; Universitat Politècnica de Catalunya; AD Telecom; Universidad Complutense de Madrid
- Launch mass: 22 kg (49 lb)
- Dimensions: 50 cm (20 in)

Start of mission
- Launch date: 29 July 2009, 18:46:29 UTC
- Rocket: Dnepr
- Launch site: Baikonur, Site 109
- Contractor: ISC Kosmotras

Orbital parameters
- Reference system: Geocentric orbit
- Regime: Low Earth orbit (Polar)
- Altitude: 650 km (400 mi)
- Inclination: 98.1°
- Period: 97.3 minutes

The Nanosat-1B Spanish satellite, designed, developed and operated by the Instituto Nacional de Técnica Aeroespacial (INTA) (National Institute of Aerospace Technology), is a nanosatellite which weighs 22 kg. Its main mission is the communication between remote sites like the Antarctic, the Hespérides warship and Spain. The Nanosat-1B has fourteen sides, all of them covered by solar cells but the bottom one where the following antennas are installed: a medium gain Ultra high frequency (UHF) four wire antenna and two patch antennas. On the top side there are four UHF monopoles. The solar sensors and the Vectorsol experiment are located in the middle tray, being all the other equipment and experiments located inside the satellite.

The Nanosat-1B covers all the Earth due to his polar orbit and it stores scientific data which are unloaded when the satellite passes the Control Centre vertical (located at INTA, Torrejón, Madrid) and the mobile stations (Nano-Terminals).

This satellite was launched on 29 July 2009 at 18:46 UTC from the Baikonur Cosmodrome in Kazakhstan, launchpad 95, by a Dnepr launch vehicle along with the other five satellites: DubaiSat-1 (this one being the main load), Deimos-1, UK-DMC 2, Aprizesat-3 and Aprizesat-4.

== Nanosat-1B payload ==
Three Experiments:

- The Two Towers (LDT): this is a high energy proton detector, which will help to characterize the special environment within a certain radiation range.
- RAD-FET: this is composed of two sensors, one for accumulated radiation doses and a magneto-impedance sensor. Both LDT and RAD-FET have been entirely developed at INTA.
- Vectorsol: this is a last generation solar sensor which allows to position the satellite. It has been developed by the Universidad de Sevilla along with the Universitat Politècnica de Catalunya and it has been submitted to flight qualification testing at INTA.

Two Communication Systems:

- S Band Transmitter-Receiver: to be tested in orbit, it has been especially designed to be on board of the new nanosatellites and microsatellites. It offers a very good performance at a very low cost. It is based on the latest FPGA technologies. It has been designed by AD Telecom, but developed and qualified at INTA.
- Medium gain UHF antenna: this four wire antenna along with the four monopoles developed by INTA will allow communications with mobile stations (Nano-Terminals) to be performed.

== Future approach ==
Besides their weight and size characteristics, the nanosatellites are a new concept of design for space system and a great opportunity to reach space at lower development cost and time. The Nanosat Program foresees several new launches with precise applications, as these platforms are particularly suitable for in orbit demonstration missions including instruments, components and supporting technologies for bigger Space Programs.

== See also ==
- Nanosat 01
- Communications satellite
