= Libertad 1 =

Colombian CubeSat

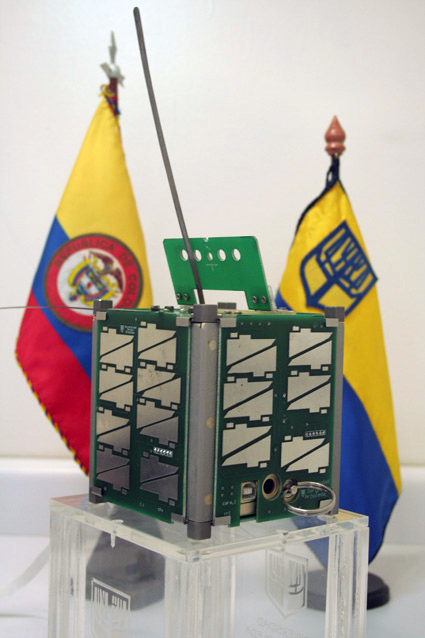
- Libertad 1
- Operator: Sergio Arboleda University
- COSPAR ID: 2007-012M
- SATCAT no.: 31128
- Website: Libertad 1 Space Program

Start of mission
- Launch date: April 17, 2007
- Rocket: Dnepr
- Launch site: Baikonur 109/95
- Contractor: ISC Kosmotras

Orbital parameters
- Reference system: Geocentric
- Regime: Low Earth
- Perigee altitude: 645.8 km
- Apogee altitude: 781.1 km
- Inclination: 98.1°
- Period: 98.9 minutes

Libertad 1 ('Freedom 1') is a single CubeSat built by the Space Program of the Sergio Arboleda University in Colombia. It is the first Colombian satellite sent to orbit. It was launched aboard a Dnepr rocket on April 17, 2007 from the Baikonur Cosmodrome, Kazakhstan and became the first Colombian satellite to orbit the Earth. It used a telemetric payload to keep it in communication with the University. It was expected to have a 50-day lifespan, however news reports two years after it was launched stated the satellite was still working and sending information, passing over Colombia twice a day.

== Team ==
- Team Leader : Raúl A. Joya & Iván Luna Castro
- C&DH Developer : Andres Alfonso Caro
- COMM & Telemetry Developer : Cesar Fernando Valero Sepulveda
- Attitude Determination : Paul Núñez
- PCBs : Miguel Ariza

== See also ==
- List of CubeSats
