= Reimei =

Japanese satellite

- Operator: JAXA
- COSPAR ID: 2005-031B
- SATCAT no.: 28810

Spacecraft properties
- Launch mass: 72 kg (159 lb)
- Dimensions: 72 cm × 62 cm × 62 cm

Start of mission
- Launch date: 24 August 2005
- Rocket: Dnepr
- Launch site: Baikonur Pad 109/95
- Contractor: ISC Kosmotras

Orbital parameters
- Reference system: Geocentric
- Regime: Low Earth orbit
- Semi-major axis: 6,975.4 km (4,334.3 mi)
- Eccentricity: 0.0027340
- Periapsis altitude: 578.19003
- Apoapsis altitude: 616.33149
- Inclination: 98.1777
- Period: 96.63 min
- Mean motion: 14.9020938 rev/day
- Epoch: May 3, 2018, 22:37:00.128 UTC

Instruments
- 25 μm-thick polyimide mirrors

Reimei ('Dawn') is the in-flight name for a small Japanese satellite known during development as INDEX (INnovative-technology Demonstration Experiment), developed in-house at JAXA both to serve as a demonstration of small-satellite technologies (particularly high-performance and high-accuracy attitude control) and to perform simultaneous optical and charged-particle observation of the aurora. A notable feature is the 25 μm-thick polyimide mirrors used for concentrating sunlight onto the solar arrays.

It is 72 cm × 62 cm × 62 cm and weighs 72 kilograms. The construction budget was $4 million. The satellite was launched into a near-Sun-synchronous 630 km orbit on 24 August 2005 as a piggyback on the OICETS launch on the Dnepr launch vehicle.
