= TRICOM-1R =

Japanese satellite

TRICOM-1R, also known as Tasuki (COSPAR 2018-016A, SATCAT 43201), was a Japanese nanosatellite that was launched during the SS-520-5 sounding rocket test launch on 3 February 2018, with a mission to conduct store and forward data relay and Earth observation using a set of cameras.

Developed by the University of Tokyo, the spacecraft was a low-cost 3U CubeSat, with a goal of realizing future cost-competitive nanosatellites in the global market by using domestic commercial products.

TRICOM-1R decayed from orbit on 21 August 2018.

== Overview ==
TRICOM-1R was built based on the 'Hodoyoshi Reliability Engineering' demonstrated by the Hodoyoshi 3 and 4 microsatellites. It was built by the University of Tokyo Intelligent Space Systems Laboratory, with funding allocated from the Japanese Ministry of Economy, Trade and Industry. The store and forward mission involved the satellite storing weak signal data from terrestrial terminals, and forwarding the data when the satellite flies above ground stations. TRICOM-1R also conducted Earth observation using its main camera and five sub cameras. The name of the spacecraft was partially based on the Japanese word Torikomu (取り込む), which means 'to take in', due to the store and forward nature of the mission.

== Launch ==
TRICOM-1R was successfully placed into orbit on 3 February 2018 at 05:03 UTC (14:03 JST), of 187 km × 2,012 km (116 mi × 1,250 mi) altitude with orbital inclination angle of 31°.

== TRICOM-1 ==
TRICOM-1R was a re-flight of the TRICOM-1 CubeSat. On 14 January 2017 at 23:33 UTC (08:33 JST), the SS-520-4 three-stage orbital rocket was launched from Uchinoura Space Center carrying TRICOM-1. 20 seconds after launch, contact was lost with the telemetry transmitter on board the rocket, and the command to ignite the second stage was not sent. The rocket then flew in a sub-orbital trajectory, reaching a maximum altitude of approximately 190 km (120 mi). TRICOM-1 is believed to have crashed into the Pacific Ocean with its launcher. Despite loss of telemetry from the rocket, the satellite was automatically released from the rocket around the time it was scheduled to, and ground stations were able to briefly receive telemetry from the satellite.

== See also ==
- Hodoyoshi 3
- Hodoyoshi 4
- 2018 in spaceflight
