= RASAT =

Turkish Earth observation satellite

- Mission type: Earth observation
- Operator: State Planning Organization (DPT)
- COSPAR ID: 2011-044D
- SATCAT no.: 37791
- Website: rasat.uzay.tubitak.gov.tr/about/
- Mission duration: Planned: 3 years Final: 11 years

Spacecraft properties
- Manufacturer: TÜBİTAK Space Technologies Research Institute (TÜBİTAK UZAY)
- Launch mass: 93 kilograms (205 lb)

Start of mission
- Launch date: August 17, 2011, 08:12:20 UTC
- Rocket: Dnepr
- Launch site: Dombarovsky 370/13

End of mission
- Deactivated: August 2022

Orbital parameters
- Reference system: Geocentric
- Regime: Sun-synchronous
- Period: 98.8 minutes

RASAT was an Earth observation satellite designed and developed by TÜBİTAK Space Technologies Research Institute (TÜBİTAK UZAY) and produced in Turkey to provide high resolution imagery. It was the first remote sensing satellite fully realized in Turkey, and the second indigenously developed remote sensing satellite after BILSAT-1.

Financed by the State Planning Organization (DPT) and designed by TÜBİTAK UZAY without any international know-how transfer, RASAT was launched from Dombarovskiy Cosmodrome, near Yasny in Russia by a Dnepr space launch vehicle at 08:12:20 UTC on August 17, 2011, along with seven other satellites Sich-2 and BPA-2 of Ukraine, NigeriaSat-2 and NigeriaSat-X of Nigeria, EduSat of India as well as AprizeSat-5 and AprizeSat-6 of Italy. RASAT was placed 16 minutes and 9 seconds after the lift-off into a low Earth orbit of 685 km (426 mi). The first signal from RASAT was received in the space center of Andøya Rocket Range, northern Norway at 09:44:04 UTC. RASAT was controlled and observed at the space center of TÜBİTAK UZAY in Ankara.

== Mission ==
Projected for a mission duration of three years, RASAT is on a Sun-synchronous geocentric orbit. Its instruments, supplied by the South Korean space technology company Satrec Initiative, allowed for a spatial resolution of 7.5 m (25 ft) at panchromatic band and 15 m (49 ft) at multispectral band. RASAT carried out various civil applications on mapping and planning, disaster management, ecosystem monitoring, environmental control, landcover survey and coastal zone management. Additionally, RASAT was used to test a custom designed on-board computer "BiLGE" capable of using SpaceWire network, a solid-state processor "GEZGİN-2" (an abbreviation for "GErçek Zamanda Görüntü İşleyeN") for real-time image compression using algorithm of JPEG 2000 and a telecommunication system "Treks" of X band transmitter module with 100 MB/s data transfer rate and 7 Watt power.

== Images ==
The first images were received in Ankara on October 8, 2011. With images captured by the satellite between 2012 and 2014, a "mosaic map" of Turkey was compiled. More than 3,000 images showing an area of 30 km × 30 km (19 mi × 19 mi) each were used for the map. The map images are available at the website "gezgin.gov.tr" in the image file formats of .ecw (high image resolution: 9 GB, low image resolution: 50 MB), .jp2 (21.8 GB, 33 MB), .tif (35.7 GB, 58.1 MB), .img (45.6 GB, 85.7 MB) and KMZ (11.3 MB). The map was distributed to governmental agencies, particularly to the State Hydraulic Works (DSİ) and Mineral Research and Exploration (MTA). In 2013, three-dimensional relief maps of Turkey created by RASAT were offered on the web. Customers are able to order and download their actual map requirements.

As of November 15, 2015, RASAT took images of 9,546,200 km^{2} (3,685,800 sq mi) Earth surface on 22,699 orbits since its launch on August 17, 2011.

A research project, named "Geoportal", was launched by Ministry of Development on January 15, 2013, with an application run-time of four years. Images were uploaded on August 19, 2014, to the portal, which is open to use by public services and universities. As of November 17, 2015, 6,517 processed images captured by RASAT were uploaded to GEZGIN portal.

== End of mission ==
RASAT was retired in August 2022, after operating for 11 years. Over its lifetime, RASAT took 13,362 images over 58,726 orbits.
