= ZACube-1 =

South African cubesat

- Mission type: Space weather
- Operator: Cape Peninsula University of Technology
- COSPAR ID: 2013-066B
- SATCAT no.: 39417
- Website: www.cput.ac.za/fsati

Spacecraft properties
- Spacecraft type: 1U CubeSat
- Manufacturer: Cape Peninsula University of Technology
- Launch mass: 1.2 kilograms (2.6 lb)

Start of mission
- Launch date: 21 November 2013, 07:10:17 UTC
- Rocket: Dnepr
- Launch site: Dombarovsky 370/13
- Contractor: Kosmotras

Orbital parameters
- Reference system: Geocentric
- Regime: Low Earth
- Perigee altitude: 596 kilometres (370 mi)
- Apogee altitude: 681 kilometres (423 mi)
- Inclination: 97.75 degrees
- Period: 97.36 minutes
- Epoch: 24 January 2015, 03:15:51 UTC

ZACube-1 (TshepisoSat), is a South African CubeSat that carries a high frequency beacon transmitter to be used for space weather research. It was launched 21 November 2013 on a Dnepr launch vehicle from Yasny, Russia. Tshepiso is the seSotho word for promise.

== Objectives ==
ZACube-1 carried a high frequency beacon transmitter and a low-resolution CMOS camera in order to perform space weather research, support education and training, enable technology demonstration, and serve as a catalyst for the national nano-satellite programme. The satellite was launched in a Dnepr from the Dombarovsky, which can be found at the following coordinates: 50°48′0″N 059°31′0″E

== See also ==
- SUNSAT, first South African satellite
- SumbandilaSat, second South African satellite
- List of CubeSats
