= KazEOSat 2 =

Remote sensing Earth observation satellite

KazEOSat-2
- Mission type: Remote sensing
- Operator: Kazakhstan Gharysh Sapary (KGS)
- COSPAR ID: 2014-033A
- SATCAT no.: 40010
- Website: kazcosmos.gov.kz/en/news/200614.html
- Mission duration: 3 years

Spacecraft properties
- Bus: SSTL-150
- Manufacturer: Surrey Satellite Technology
- Launch mass: ~177 kilograms (390 lb)
- Dimensions: 700 by 800 by 900 millimetres (28 in × 31 in × 35 in)
- Power: 150 watts

Start of mission
- Launch date: June 19, 2014, 19:11 UTC
- Rocket: Dnepr
- Launch site: Dombarovsky 370/13
- Contractor: Kosmotras

Orbital parameters
- Reference system: Geocentric
- Regime: Sun-Synchronous
- Perigee altitude: 611 kilometres (380 mi)
- Apogee altitude: 636 kilometres (395 mi)
- Inclination: 97.9 degrees
- Period: 97.1 minutes
- Epoch: 26 June 2014

KazEOSat-2 is a medium-resolution remote sensing Earth observation satellite built for the Kazakhstan Gharysh Sapary. It is capable of imaging up to 1,000,000 square kilometres (390,000 square miles) per day. It is used by the government of Kazakhstan for resource management, environmental monitoring, and land-use mapping.

== Development and launch ==
KazEOSat-2 was built for the Kazakhstan Gharysh Sapary under an agreement with EADS Astrium and SSTL, satellite-manufacturing companies in France and the United Kingdom, respectively. The satellite was designed and developed by SSTL, and represents the 11th launch of the SSTL-150 satellite bus, first launched in 2005.

Development of the satellite took 3 years. KazEOSat-2 was launched on 19 June 2014 from the Dombarovsky Cosmodrome in Yasny, Orenburg Oblast, Russia, aboard a Dnepr-1 rocket by launch company ISC Kosmotras. Its intended operational lifetime was 7 years.

Due to the approaching end of its operational lifetime, three KazEOSat-MR satellites are planned to launch in 2027 in order to replace KazEOSat-2.

== Instruments ==
The primary instrument aboard KazEOSat-2 is a multispectral imager developed by Jena-Optronik GmBH known as KEIS (Kazakh Earth Imaging System) or JSS-56 (Jena-Optronik Spaceborne Scanner-56). It has a spatial resolution of 6.5 metres (21 ft) per pixel, and is capable of imaging up to 1,000,000 square kilometres (390,000 square miles) per day with a field of view of 6.75 degrees about its nadir. It uses a three-mirror anastigmat design for its collector optics, which direct received light to five linear 12000-pixel charge-coupled device sensors.

The imager takes 77 km (48 mi) by 77 km (48 mi) "image scenes". It can stitch these image scenes together in three imaging modes: as an "image strip" of up to 4,000 kilometres (2,500 mi) long; in "stereo mode", allowing for determination of height information by combining data from two overlapping image scenes with 30-degree pitch angles; and in "mosaic mode", which is used to capture wide-swath imaging from two separate, adjacent, image scenes. The shooting period for image capture is typically 3-5 days.

KazEOSat-2 is oriented in space using a system of reaction wheels, and uses a xenon ion thruster for orbit corrections, which occur approximately once per month.
