= Delfi-n3Xt =

Dutch nanosatellite

- Mission type: Education and Technology Demonstration
- Operator: Delft University of Technology
- COSPAR ID: 2013-066N
- SATCAT no.: 39428
- Website: www.delfispace.nl
- Mission duration: 12 years, 2 months, 1 day (in progress)

Spacecraft properties
- Spacecraft type: 3U CubeSat
- Manufacturer: Pumpkin, Inc
- Launch mass: 3 kilograms (6.6 lb)
- Dimensions: 10 x 10 x 30 cm

Start of mission
- Launch date: 21 November 2013, 07:10:16 UTC
- Rocket: Dnepr
- Launch site: Dombarovsky 370/13
- Contractor: Kosmotras

Orbital parameters
- Reference system: Geocentric
- Regime: Low Earth
- Perigee altitude: 599 kilometres (372 mi)
- Apogee altitude: 780 kilometres (480 mi)
- Inclination: 97.76 degrees
- Period: 98.41 minutes
- Epoch: 24 May 2014, 14:04:39 UTC

Delfi-n3Xt is a Dutch nanosatellite which is operated by Delft University of Technology. It was launched on 21 November 2013. It is a three-unit CubeSat which will be used to demonstrate propulsion and communications systems for future missions.

Delfi-n3Xt was launched successfully by a Dnepr carrier rocket flying from Site 370/13 at the Dombarovsky launch site. Delfi was a secondary payload aboard the rocket, whose primary mission was to deploy DubaiSat 2 and STSAT-3. Delfi was one of 25 secondary payloads aboard the rocket, for a total of 32 satellites.

The Delfi team made contact with the satellite during its first pass.
