= FUNcube-1 =

Educational CubeSat satellite

FUNcube-1 (AO-73)
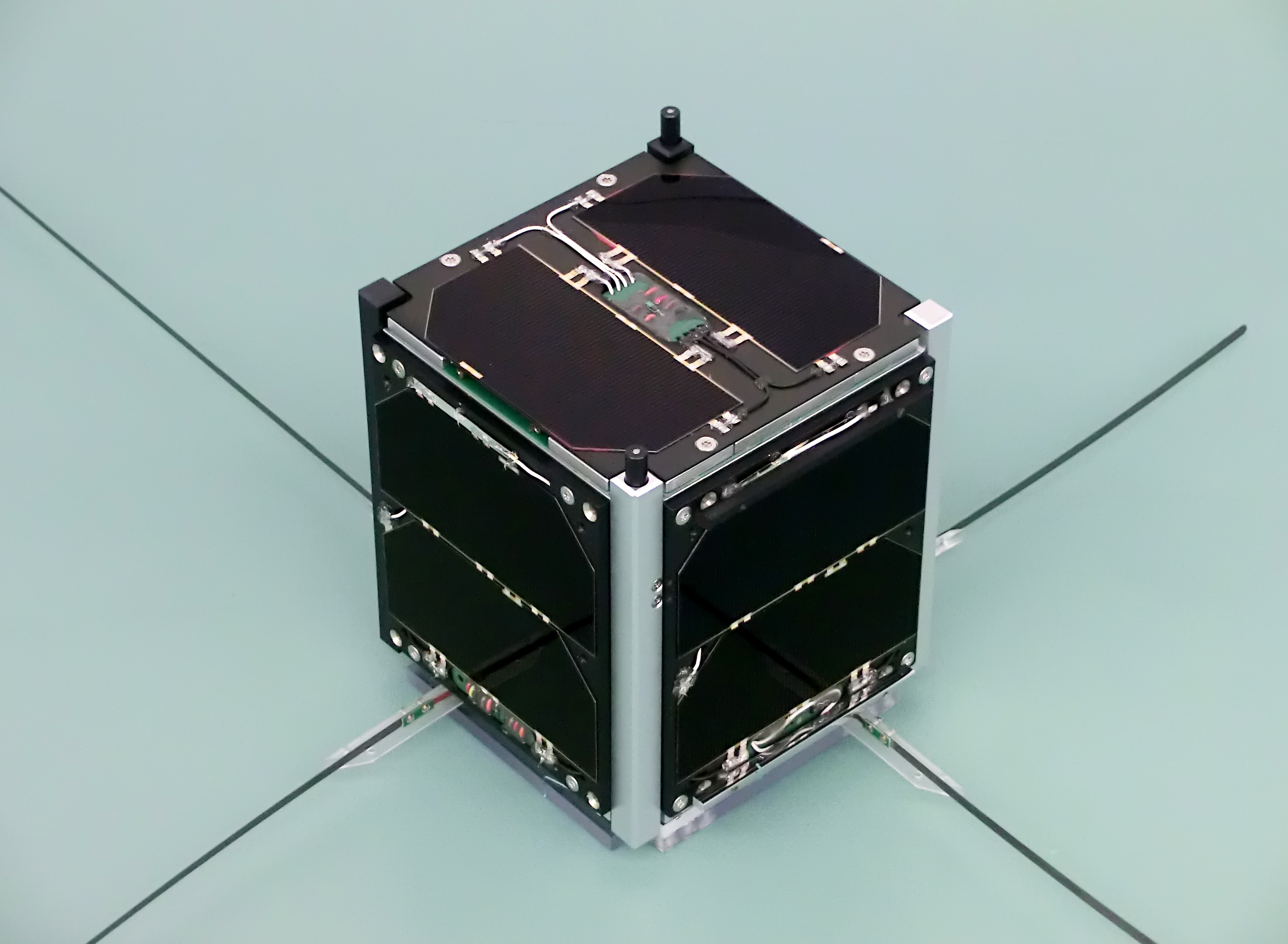
- FUNcube-1 in the cleanroom
- Mission type: Amateur Radio
- Operator: AMSAT-UK
- COSPAR ID: 2013-066AE
- SATCAT no.: 39444
- Website: funcube.org.uk
- Mission duration: 12 years, 7 months and 27 days elapsed

Spacecraft properties
- Bus: 1U CubeSat
- Manufacturer: ISIS-BV, AMSAT-NL, AMSAT-UK
- Launch mass: 0.98 kilograms (2.2 lb)
- Power: 2.2 watts

Start of mission
- Launch date: 21 November 2013
- Rocket: Dnepr
- Launch site: Yasny Launch Base
- Contractor: ISL

Orbital parameters
- Reference system: Geocentric
- Regime: Low Earth
- Perigee altitude: 592.6 kilometers (368 Mi)
- Apogee altitude: 678.6 kilometers (421 Mi)
- Inclination: 97.7 Degrees
- Period: 97.3 Minutes

FUNcube-1 is a complete educational single unit CubeSat satellite with the goal of enthusing and educating young people about radio, space, physics and electronics. It is part of a program which aims to launch more of these educational CubeSats. It is the first satellite with outreach as its primary mission.

== FUNcube project ==
=== Project ===
The FUNcube project was started in the UK by AMSAT-UK. The satellite has been developed by a team of volunteers from AMSAT-UK and AMSAT-NL, and was assembled at Innovative Solutions In Space (ISISPACE) in Delft, Netherlands. It has been designated with OSCAR number 73 by AMSAT and is now also known as AO-73.

=== Mission ===
As part of its mission, FUNcube-1 carries a materials science experiment, from which the school students can receive telemetry data and which they can compare to the results they obtained from similar reference experiments in the classroom. This experiment resembles the Leslie's Cube experiment. One of the first schools to use FUNcube-1 in the classroom was Abbeys Primary School in Bletchley which also featured in the BBC breakfast news two days after launch.

== Satellite ==
=== Instruments ===
FUNcube-1 is equipped with a UHF to VHF linear transponder with approx 300 mW PEP output and which can be used by Radio Amateurs worldwide for SSB and CW communications during the weekends.

=== Specifications ===
Frequencies:

- Telemetry down link 145.935 MHz 1200bd BPSK with FEC
- Transponder Uplink 435.150 - 435.130 MHz LSB (Inverting)
- Downlink 145.950 - 145.970 MHz USB

Maximum uplink power of 5 watts to a 7 dBi gain antenna, more power is not needed to use the transponder. Transponder is SSB/CW Inverting.

== Launch ==
FUNcube-1 was launched at 07:10:11 UTC on 21 November 2013, as part of the ISILaunch03 campaign, aboard a Dnepr rocket, from Yasny Launch Base, Russia. The launch was contracted by ISL, and operated by ISC Kosmotras.

== Distribution ==
The FUNcube distributed ground station network (DGSN) is used in which radio amateurs receive packets and send these via the internet to the central data collection server, called the data warehouse.

To enable easy reception, one of the FUNcube team members, Howard Long G6LVB, has created a USB connected receiver called the FUNcube Dongle.

== See also ==
- 2013 in spaceflight
- List of CubeSats
- AMSAT
- OSCAR
