= Dnepr (rocket) =

Converted Satan ICBM used as a satellite launch vehicle

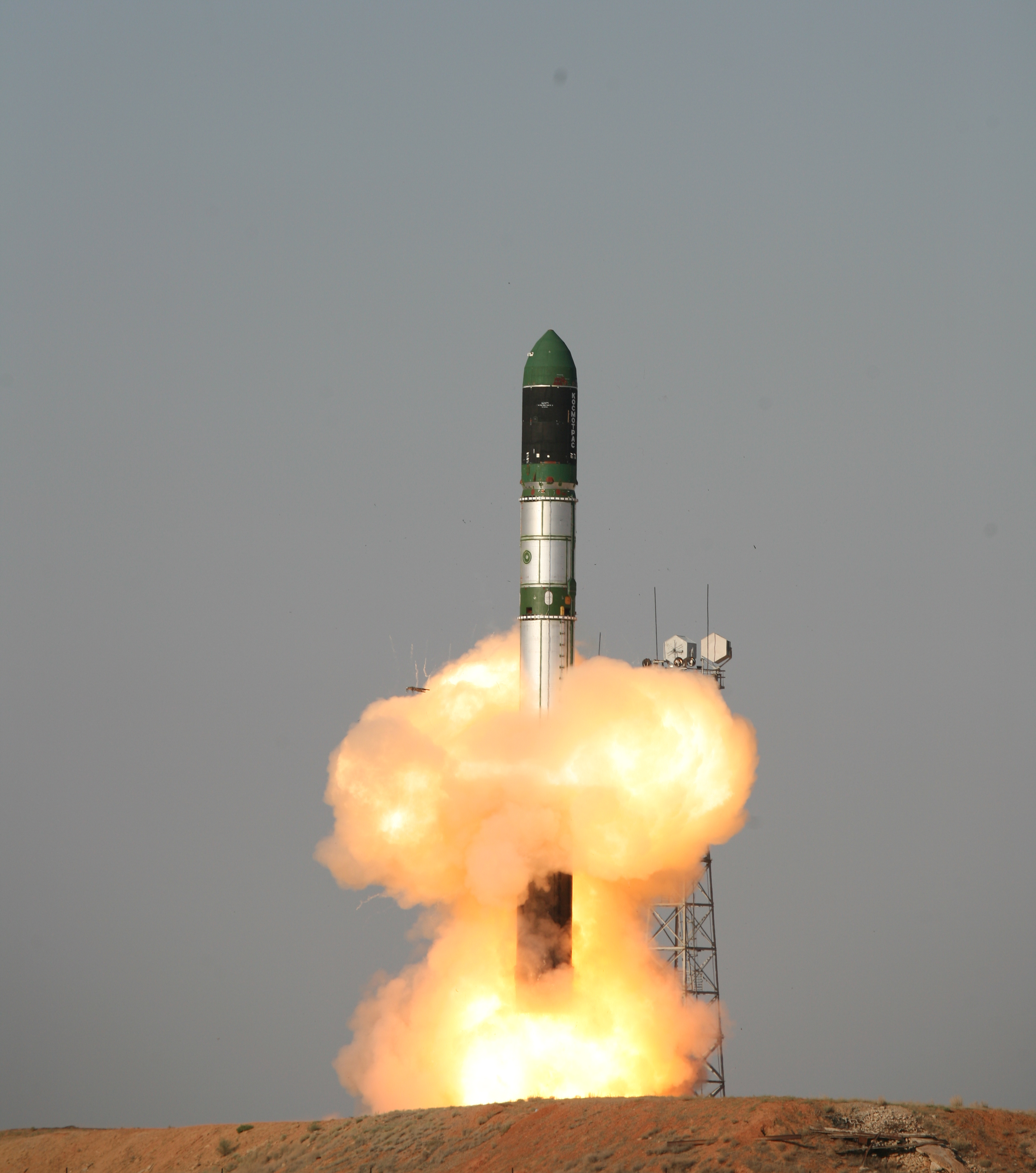
- Function: Orbital carrier rocket
- Manufacturer: Yuzhnoye Design Bureau (design); Yuzhmash (manufacturing); Khartron (control system)
- Country of origin: Soviet Union (original build), Ukraine (commercial launches after 1999)
- Cost per launch: US$29 million

Size
- Height: 34.3 m (113 ft)
- Diameter: 3 m (9.8 ft)
- Mass: 211,000 kg (465,000 lb)
- Stages: 3

Capacity

Payload to LEO
- Mass: 4,500 kilograms (9,900 lb)

Payload to the ISS
- Mass: 3,200 kilograms (7,100 lb)

Payload to SSO
- Mass: 2,300 kilograms (5,100 lb)

Payload to TLI
- Mass: 550 kilograms (1,210 lb) (with ST-1)

Associated rockets
- Based on: R-36M

Launch history
- Status: Retired
- Launch sites: Site 109/95, Baikonur; LC-13, Yasny
- Total launches: 22
- Success(es): 21
- Failure: 1
- First flight: 21 April 1999
- Last flight: 25 March 2015

First stage
- Powered by: 1 RD-264 module (four RD-263 engines)
- Maximum thrust: 4,520 kN (1,020,000 lb_{f})
- Specific impulse: 318 s (3.12 km/s)
- Burn time: 130 seconds
- Propellant: N_{2}O_{4} / UDMH

Second stage
- Powered by: 1 RD-0255 module (one RD-0256 main engine and one RD-0257 vernier)
- Maximum thrust: 755 kN (170,000 lb_{f})
- Specific impulse: 340 s (3.3 km/s)
- Burn time: 190 seconds
- Propellant: N_{2}O_{4} / UDMH

Third stage
- Powered by: 1 RD-864
- Maximum thrust: 20.2 kN (4,500 lb_{f})
- Specific impulse: 309 s (3.03 km/s)
- Burn time: 1,000 seconds
- Propellant: N_{2}O_{4} / UDMH

The Dnepr rocket (Russian: Днепр, romanized: Dnepr; Ukrainian: Дніпро, romanized: Dnipró) was a space launch vehicle named after the Dnieper River. It was a converted ICBM used for launching artificial satellites into orbit, operated by launch service provider ISC Kosmotras. The first launch, on April 21, 1999, successfully placed UoSAT-12, a 350 kg demonstration mini-satellite, into a 650 km circular Low Earth orbit. It was also known in some older sources during development as the Ikar.

== History ==
Dnepr launch video

The Dnepr was based on the R-36MUTTH Intercontinental ballistic missile (ICBM) – called the SS-18 Satan by NATO – designed in the 1970s by the Yuzhnoe Design Bureau in Dnepropetrovsk, Ukrainian SSR. Among the outstanding authors of the project were people like Boris Gubanov and Sergey Sopov.

The Dnepr control system was developed and produced by the JSC "Khartron", Kharkiv. The Dnepr was a three-stage rocket using storable hypergolic liquid propellants. The launch vehicles used for satellite launches have been withdrawn from ballistic missile service with the Russian Strategic Rocket Forces and stored for commercial use. A group of a total of 150 ICBMs were allowed under certain geopolitical disarmament protocols to be converted for use, and can be launched through 2020. The Dnepr was launched from the Russian-controlled Baikonur cosmodrome in Kazakhstan and the Dombarovsky launch base, near Yasny, in the Orenburg region of Russia.

In February 2015, following a year of strained relations including the Euromaidan and the Russo-Ukrainian war, Russia announced that it would sever its "joint program with Ukraine to launch Dnepr rockets and [was] no longer interested in buying Ukrainian Zenit boosters, deepening problems for [Ukraine's] space program and its struggling Yuzhmash factory." However ISC Kosmotras reported that they would continue to fulfill their obligations for three Dnepr launches in 2015, of which only one took place.

By the end of 2016, no further launch had materialized and the remaining customers had switched to alternative launch providers.

ISC Kosmotras proposed using a Dnepr rocket to launch a modified version of the Soyuz spacecraft with no orbital module and a reduced service module, intended as a recoverable microgravity laboratory or an emergency vehicle for cosmonaut rescue.

Business magnate Elon Musk tried to purchase refurbished Dnepr rockets for a low price from Russia but returned empty-handed after failing to find any that he felt were affordable. This led him to the creation of his own private rocket launch company, now known as SpaceX.

== Performance ==
The Dnepr launch vehicle had only a small number of modifications compared to the R-36M ICBM in service. The main difference was the payload adapter located in the space head module and a modified flight-control unit. This baseline version could lift 3,600 kg into a 300 km low Earth orbit at an inclination of 50.6°, or 2,300 kg to a 300 km Sun-synchronous orbit at an inclination of 98.0°. On a typical mission the Dnepr deployed a larger main payload and a secondary payload of Miniaturized satellites and CubeSats.

== Launch history ==
Before the Dnepr entered commercial service it was in service with the Strategic Rocket Forces which launched the ICBM version over 160 times with a reliability of 97%. The rocket had been used several times for commercial purposes with a single failure.

The Dnepr has at two points held the record for the most satellites orbited in a single launch; the April 2007 launch with 14 payloads held the record until 20 November 2013, when an American Minotaur I placed 29 satellites and two experiment packages into orbit. The next day a Dnepr re-took the record, placing 32 satellites and an experiment package bolted to the upper stage into low Earth orbit. This record was broken by an Antares launch in January 2014 which carried 34 spacecraft.

Flight	Date (UTC)	Payload	Orbit	Site
1	April 21, 1999; 04:59	UoSAT-12	LEO 650 km / 65˚	Baikonur
2	September 26, 2000; 10:05	MegSat-1 (Italy); UniSat (Italy); TiungSat-1 (Malaysia); SaudiSat-1A/1B (Saudi Arabia)	LEO 650 km / 65˚	Baikonur
3	December 20, 2002; 17:00	LatinSat 1/2 (Argentina); SaudiSat-1S (Saudi Arabia); UniSat 2 (Italy); Rubin 2 (Germany); TrailBlazer Test (USA)	LEO 650 km / 65˚	Baikonur
4	June 29, 2004; 06:30	Demeter (France); Saudicomsat-1/2 (Saudi Arabia); SaudiSat 2 (Saudi Arabia); LatinSat C/D (Argentina); Unisat-3 (Italy); Amsat Echo (USA)	SSO 700 × 850 km / 98˚	Baikonur
5	August 23, 2005; 21:10	OICETS (Japan); INDEX / Reimei (Japan); Turkmenistan Memorial Capsule (Turkmenistan)	SSO 600 × 550 km / 98˚	Baikonur
6	July 12, 2006; 14:53	Genesis I (USA)	LEO 560 km / 65˚	Yasny
7	July 26, 2006; 19:43	BelKA (Belarus); UniSat-4 (Italy); PiCPoT (Italy); Baumanets (Russia); AeroCube-1; PolySat CP-1/2; ICEcube-1/2; ION; KUTESat; Merope; Rincon 1; Mea Huaka`i (Voyager) (USA); SACRED (USA); HAUSAT-1 (South Korea); Ncube-1 (Norway); SEEDS (Japan)	failed to reach orbit	Baikonur
8	April 17, 2007; 06:46	EgyptSat 1; SaudiSat 3; SaudiComSat 3-7; PolySat CP-3/4; CAPE-1; Libertad 1 (Colombia); AeroCube 2; CubeSat TestBed 1; MAST	SSO 692 × 665 km / 98˚	Baikonur
9	June 15, 2007; 02:14	TerraSAR-X	LEO 514 km / 97˚	Baikonur
10	June 28, 2007; 15:02	Genesis II	LEO 560 km / 65˚	Yasny
11	August 29, 2008; 07:16	RapidEye 1-5		Baikonur
12	October 1, 2008; 06:37	THEOS	SSO	Yasny
13	July 29, 2009; 18:46	DubaiSat-1; Deimos-1; UK-DMC 2; Nanosat 1B; AprizeSat-3/4	SSO	Baikonur
14	April 8, 2010; 13:57	Cryosat-2	Polar	Baikonur
15	June 15, 2010; 14:42	Prisma; PICARD; BPA-1	SSO	Yasny
16	June 21, 2010; 02:14	TanDEM-X	LEO	Baikonur
17	August 17, 2011; 07:12	Sich-2; NigeriaSat-2; NigeriaSat-X; RASAT; EduSAT; AprizeSat-5/6; BPA-2	LEO	Yasny
18	August 22, 2013; 14:39	KOMPSat-5	LEO	Yasny
19	November 21, 2013; 07:10	iCube-1 (Pakistan); STSAT-3; DubaiSat-2; SkySat 1; WNISAT 1; Lem (BRITE-PL); AprizeSat-7/8; UniSat 5; Delfi-n3Xt; Dove 3/4; Triton 1; CINEMA 2/3; OPTOS; CubeBug 2; GOMX 1; NEE-02 Krysaor; FUNcube-1; HiNCube; ZACUBE-1; BPA 3; HumSat-D; PUCP-SAT 1; First-MOVE; UWE 3; VELOX-P 2; BeakerSat 1; $50SAT; QubeScout S1; Wren; Pocket-PUCP	LEO	Yasny
20	June 19, 2014; 19:11	Deimos-2; KazEOSat 2; UniSat 6; SaudiSat-4; AprizeSat-9/10; Hodoyoshi 3 / Hodoyoshi 4; BRITE CA-1/2; TabletSat-Aurora; BugSat 1; Perseus-M 1/2; QB50 P1/P2; NanoSatC-Br 1; DTUSat 2; POPSAT-HIP 1; PolyITAN 1; PACE; Duchifat-1; Flock-1c 1-11; AeroCube 6; Lemur-1; ANTELSAT; Tigrisat	LEO	Yasny
21	November 6, 2014; 07:35	ASNARO 1; Hodoyoshi 1; ChubuSat 1; TSUBAME; QSAT-EOS	LEO	Yasny
22	March 25, 2015; 22:08	KOMPSat-3A	LEO	Yasny

=== Launch failure ===
The committee investigating the failed launch on July 26, 2006, concluded that the failure was caused by a malfunctioning of the pumping hydraulic drive of combustion chamber #4. The control malfunctioning brought about the disturbances, which led to the roll instability, excessive dispersions of the yaw and pitch angles. Thrust termination occurred at 74 seconds after lift-off. The crash site was located 150 km from the launch pad in an unpopulated area of Kazakhstan. Toxic propellants polluted the crash site, forcing Russia to pay US$1.1m in compensation. The rocket used for this launch was more than twenty years old. Procedures for launch have been changed to prevent future malfunctions of this kind.

== See also ==
- Comparison of orbital launchers families
- Dnipro (anti-air missile)
- R-36 (missile)
- Tsyklon, another launch vehicle family based on the R-36
- Rokot
- Minotaur (rocket family), US launch vehicles made from converted ICBMs
