= Dombarovsky (air base) =

Military facility in Orenburg Oblast, Russia

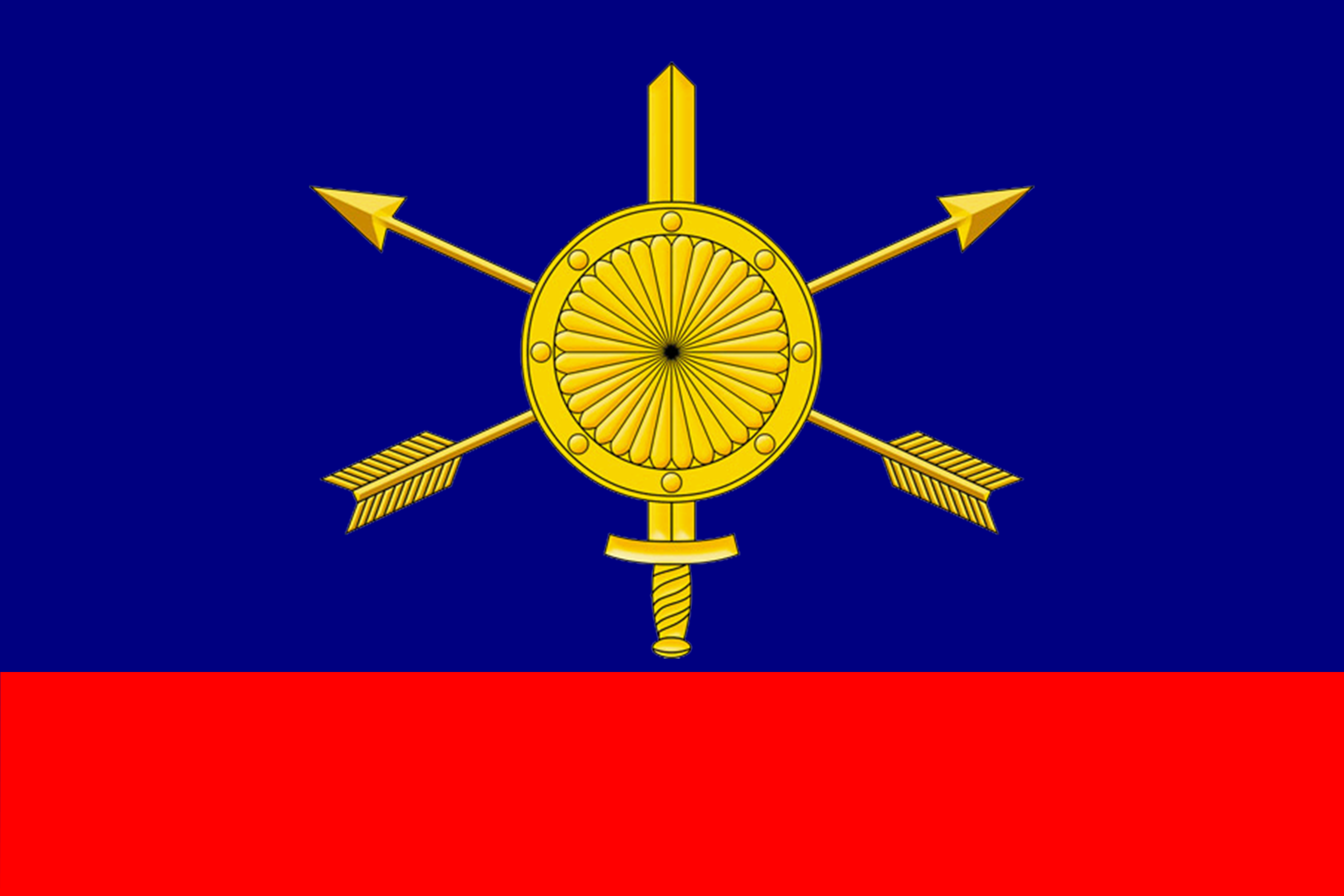
Dombarovsky Yasnaya
- Yasny, Orenburg Oblast in Russia
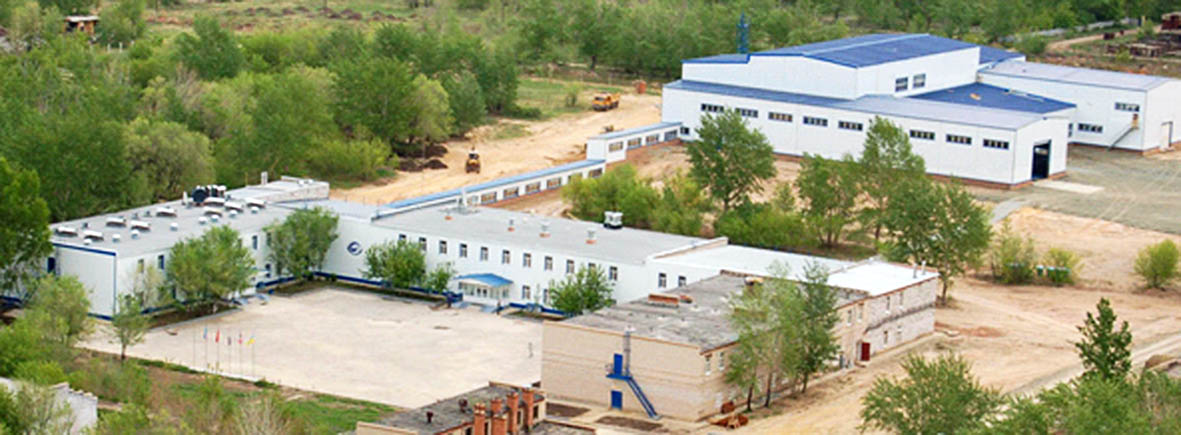

Site information
- Type: Air Base
- Owner: Ministry of Defence
- Operator: Strategic Rocket Forces

Location
- Shown within Orenburg Oblast Dombarovsky (Russia)
- Coordinates: 51°02′56″N 59°51′12″E

Site history
- In use: 1953-present

Airfield information
- Identifiers: ICAO: XWTD
- Elevation: 265 metres (869 ft) AMSL
Runways
Direction	Length and surface
	Concrete
Helipads
Number	Length and surface
04/22	210 metres (689 ft) Concrete

Dombarovsky (also given as Dombarovskiy and Tagilom) is a military airbase 5 kilometres (3.1 mi) northwest of the village of Dombarovsky, near Yasny in Russia's Orenburg Oblast. Operated by the Soviet Air Defence Forces and later by the Russian Air Force, it hosted fighter interceptor squadrons and hosts an ICBM base (which has been adapted for commercial satellite launches) with a supporting helicopter base.

The site is divided into three sites:

- The former main runway and dispersals: 51°05′35″N 59°50′45″E
- The current ICBM base: 50°48′12″N 59°30′59″E
- The current ICBM support helicopter base: 51°02′56″N 59°51′12″E home to the 84th Independent Helicopter Squadron of the 13th Red Banner Rocket Division

== Interceptor base ==
The facility featured three revetment compounds.

The 412th Fighter Aviation Regiment (412 IAP PVO) flew from the base from August 1949 with the La-11, MiG-15, and MiG-17 to 1962. By the 1970s it was flying the Sukhoi Su-9 (Fishpot) aircraft. The regiment replaced it in 1978 with the Mikoyan-Gurevich MiG-23M (Flogger-B). From 1953-60 it reported to the 101st Fighter Aviation Division PVO, and then to the 19th Air Defence Corps of the 4th Independent Air Defence Army. It disbanded in 1993.

Other reporting of the 763rd Fighter Aviation Regiment (763 IAP) flying MiG-23 aircraft in 1991 appears to be incorrect. The 763rd Fighter Aviation Regiment was, it appears from more recent data, flying from Yugorsk-2.

== ICBM base ==
Dombarovsky is also the home of the 13th Dombarovsky Red Banner Division, 31st Missile Army of the Strategic Rocket Forces. The base was built during the mid-60s along with the majority of the Soviet ICBM bases.

The first base commander was Major-General Dmitri Chaplygin. Up to 10 units of Strategic Rocket Forces were based in the area, each with anywhere from 6 to 10 operational silos. At the peak of operations, Dombarovsky maintained a total of 64 silos on full alert. By 2002, according to the Russian press, the number had dropped to 52. The missiles deployed in the region were primarily the RS-20 type and its sub-variants.

On 22 December 2004, the Rocket Forces conducted from the base a test launch of an R-36M2 to the Kamchatka Peninsula.

Western investigative outlets Danwatch (Denmark) and Der Spiegel (Germany) exposed a large amount of confidential information on the modernization of the base in May 2025, retrieving "more than two million documents" on the Russian Strategic Missile Forces over several years from a public database for contractors. These include detailed information on the building projects, incl. groundplans, electricity, piping, usage of the rooms by staff, and even surveillance cameras. They confirmed the base as being used for the new hypersonic Avangard system.

== Commercial launches ==
With the conversion of the R-36M ICBM for use as a satellite launch vehicle, the Dnepr system, Dombarovsky has launched a number of commercial payloads. These civilian launches are operated by the Russian Air Force on behalf of the launcher's operator, Russian/Ukrainian consortium Kosmotras. Kosmotras calls the facility Yasny launch base, and has constructed additional facilities necessary for commercial satellite launch operations, including clean room integration facilities.

Launch	Date (UTC)	Vehicle	Payload	Launch pad	Result	Remarks / References
1	12 July 2006	Dnepr	Genesis I	Dombarovsky	Success	Bigelow Aerospace payload, in a 550 km, 64.5 degree inclination orbit
2	28 June 2007	Dnepr	Genesis II	Dombarovsky	Success	Bigelow Aerospace payload, orbit nearly identical to Genesis I
3	1 October 2008	Dnepr	THEOS	Dombarovsky	Success	Launched for GISTDA
4	15 June 2010	Dnepr	Prisma, Picard, BPA-1	Dombarovsky	Success	
5	17 August 2011	Dnepr	Sich-2; NigeriaSat-2; NX; RASAT; EduSAT; AprizeSat-5; AprizeSat-6; BPA-2	Dombarovsky	Success	
6	22 August 2013	Dnepr	KOMPSAT-5	Dombarovsky	Success	South Korea's satellite in LEO orbit
7	21 November 2013	Dnepr	iCube-1; STSAT-3; DubaiSat-2; SkySat 1; WNISAT 1; Lem (BRITE-PL); AprizeSat-7/8; UniSat 5; Delfi-n3Xt; Dove 3/4; Triton 1; CINEMA 2/3; OPTOS; CubeBug 2; GOMX 1; NEE-02 Krysaor; FUNcube-1; HiNCube; ZACUBE-1; BPA 3; HumSat-D; PUCP-SAT 1; First-MOVE; UWE 3; VELOX-P 2; BeakerSat 1; $50SAT; QubeScout S1; Wren; Pocket-PUCP	Dombarovsky	Success	32 satellites, most of them cubesats
8	19 June 2014	Dnepr	Deimos-2; KazEOSat 2; UniSat 6; SaudiSat-4; AprizeSat-9/10; Hodoyoshi 3 / Hodoyoshi 4; BRITE CA-1/2; TabletSat-Aurora; BugSat 1; Perseus-M 1/2; QB50 P1/P2; NanoSatC-Br 1; DTUSat 2; POPSAT-HIP 1; PolyITAN 1; PACE; Duchifat-1; Flock-1c 1-11; AeroCube 6; Lemur-1; ANTELSAT; Tigrisat	Dombarovsky	Success	37 satellites
9	6 November 2014	Dnepr	ASNARO 1; Hodoyoshi 1; ChubuSat 1; TSUBAME; QSAT-EOS	Dombarovsky	Success	Japanese satellites
10	25 March 2015	Dnepr	KOMPSAT-3A	Dombarovsky	Success	South Korea's satellite in LEO orbit

== See also ==
- List of military airbases in Russia
