= Edusat =

Edusat or EDUSAT may refer to:

- GSAT-3, an Indian communications satellite which is also known as EDUSAT
- EduSAT, an Italian microsatellite
- Red EduSat, an Educational Television Network in Mexico
- EduSat, an educational television channel in Poland
