= BelKA =

Failed Belarusian Earth satellite

- Mission type: Earth observation
- Operator: National Academy of Sciences of Belarus
- Mission duration: 5 years (planned); Failed to orbit

Spacecraft properties
- Launch mass: ~750 kilograms (1,650 lb)

Start of mission
- Launch date: July 26, 2006
- Rocket: Dnepr
- Launch site: Baikonur 109/95

Orbital parameters
- Reference system: Geocentric
- Regime: Low Earth Orbit
- Perigee altitude: 510 kilometres (320 mi)
- Apogee altitude: 510 kilometres (320 mi)
- Epoch: Planned

BelKA or BKA (an acronym from Belarusian: Беларускі Касмічны Апарат, Belarusian Cosmic Apparatus) is the first satellite of independent Belarus.

== First attempt ==
It was a remote sensing satellite that utilizes the USP (satellite bus), developed by Belarusian researchers and Russian Rocket and Space Corporation RSC Energia for National Academy of Sciences of the Republic of Belarus as the final customer of the satellite, which had the capacity to take photos of the Earth surface, with a maximum resolution of 2-2.5 meters.

BelKA was launched, along with seventeen other satellites, on July 26, 2006 at 19:43 GMT, however 86 seconds later, the Dnepr rocket suffered an engine failure and crashed, destroying the satellites.

The name BelKA is thought to be an allusion to the Soviet space dog, Belka, who, together with Strelka orbited the Earth and returned safely on Sputnik 5 in 1960.

- Configuration: Victoria bus
- Outcome: Carrier rocket failure, satellite destroyed

== Second attempt ==
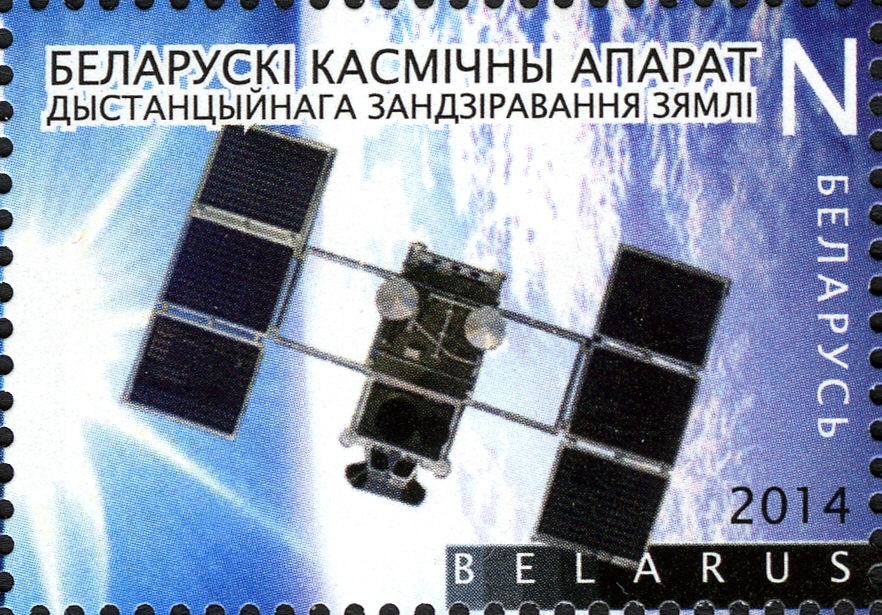
Belarusian Space Apparatus

The second launch (BKA) was successful. It was launched together with the Russian satellite Canopus-B on the Soyuz-FG/Fregat launch vehicle from the Baikonur Cosmodrome on July 22, 2012, after a long delay. Belarus put the blame for the delay onto British software. It was planned to be operational until the end of 2021.
