= EduSAT =

Italian microsatellite

- Mission type: Technology; Educational outreach
- Operator: ASI; Sapienza
- COSPAR ID: 2011-044A
- SATCAT no.: 37788

Spacecraft properties
- Manufacturer: Sapienza
- Launch mass: 10 kilograms (22 lb)

Start of mission
- Launch date: 17 August 2011, 07:12:20 UTC
- Rocket: Dnepr
- Launch site: Dombarovsky 370/13
- Contractor: Kosmtras

Orbital parameters
- Reference system: Geocentric
- Regime: Sun-synchronous
- Perigee altitude: 644 kilometres (400 mi)
- Apogee altitude: 699 kilometres (434 mi)
- Inclination: 98.20 degrees
- Period: 98.04 minutes
- Epoch: 22 November 2013, 05:10:16 UTC

EduSAT is an Italian microsatellite which was launched in August 2011. The satellite was built and is operated by the Sapienza University of Rome in conjunction with the Italian Space Agency ASI, and is primarily used for educational outreach and technology demonstration.

EduSAT is a 10-kilogram (22 lb) satellite, measuring 31.5 by 31.5 by 26.0 centimetres (12.4 in × 12.4 in × 10.2 in). The spacecraft is powered by surface-mounted solar cells. It carries an experimental analogue Sun sensor, a magnetometer and a temperature sensor. The satellite also tested a prototype PocketQube deployer and a passive deorbit mechanism. As of September 2013 it remained operational.

EduSAT was launched aboard a Dnepr carrier rocket from Site 370/13 at the Dombarovsky launch site in Russia. The launch was conducted by Kosmotras with liftoff occurring at 07:12:20 on 17 August 2011. The rocket carried six other satellites, with an additional payload bolted to the upper stage. The satellite was placed into a Sun-synchronous low Earth orbit. As of 22 November 2013 it was in an orbit with a perigee of 644 kilometres (400 mi), an apogee of 699 kilometres (434 mi), 98.20 degrees inclination and a period of 98.04 minutes.
