= SaudiSat-4 =

Saudi Arabian micro-satellite

- Mission type: Space Science
- Operator: KACST
- COSPAR ID: 2014-033G
- SATCAT no.: 40016

Spacecraft properties
- Manufacturer: King Abdulaziz City for Science and Technology

Start of mission
- Launch date: 19:11, 19 June 2014 (UTC)
- Rocket: Dnepr
- Launch site: Dombarovsky site 370/13

Orbital parameters
- Reference system: Geocentric
- Regime: Sun Synchronous
- Perigee altitude: 620 km
- Apogee altitude: 620 km
- Inclination: 97.9°

SaudiSat-4 is a Saudi Arabian micro-satellite launched in 2014. It was built by the National Satellite Technology Center at KACST.

== Launch ==
SaudiSat-4 was launched from Dombarovsky (air base) site 13, Russia, on 19 June 2014 by a Dnepr rocket.

== Mission ==
The satellite is intended primarily for technology verification in space, main test piece being UV light diodes, intended for removal of static charge from the proof mass. Proof mass experiment is expected to pave the way to engineering of gravitational reference sensor (GRS) of drag-free spacecraft. This device has an applications for the tentative Laser Interferometer Space Antenna gravity wave detector.

== See also ==
- 2014 in spaceflight
