= SACRED =

Destroyed cubesat built by the University of Arizona

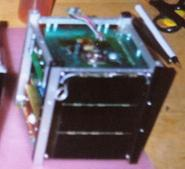
SACRED

SACRED was a Cubesat built by the Student Satellite Program of the University of Arizona. It was the product of the work of about 50 students, ranging from college freshmen to Ph. D. students, over the course of several years. It was launched, after being postponed several times, on board a Dnepr on July 26, 2006. The launch was a failure.

== Listening ==
To listen to SACRED if it had made orbit, a person would have needed the following:

1. The keplerian elements, in order to know where the satellite is pointed.
2. A radio capable of operating on 436.870 MHz, which will change with doppler shifting.
3. A 1200 baud AFSK modem, preferably a very low-end, that does no modulation on its own. Cubesat Groundstation uses a custom-built hardware modem, and possibly a software modem (using the sound card as an Analog-to-Digital converter).
4. The UA Cubesat GS software would help, however, it is not currently available to the public.
5. A good antenna system, the design of the antennas is not optimal.

== Components ==
SACRED had the following components included:

- 6 solar cells
- Aluminum frame - built to spin-stabilize through sunlight
- Power board (used to hold batteries, maintain 5V and 3.3V charges, measure voltages and currents in several spots, and convert the power from the solar cells to usable power.)
- Microcontroller board, which is used to gather and transmit telemetry.
- Radio board, which is used for 2 way communication
- Experiment - A radiation experiment, which will monitor the radiation effect on several components over long periods of time.

== Specifications ==
These specifications are without respect to the payload.

- Dimensions - 10 cm×10 cm×10 cm
- Mass - max 1 kg (Actual ~900 gram)
- Power Generation - Optimum ~2 W, average on sun side ~1.5 W
- Max power output - 3W when transmitting data
- Min power output - 100 mW when in quiet state

== Current status ==
SACRED was launched with UA's satellite, Rincon 1 on July 26, 2006, at 19:43 UTC on board a Dnepr rocket. The launch failed shortly after takeoff and SACRED was destroyed.

== See also ==
- List of CubeSats
