= TabletSat-Aurora =

Russian micro-satellite

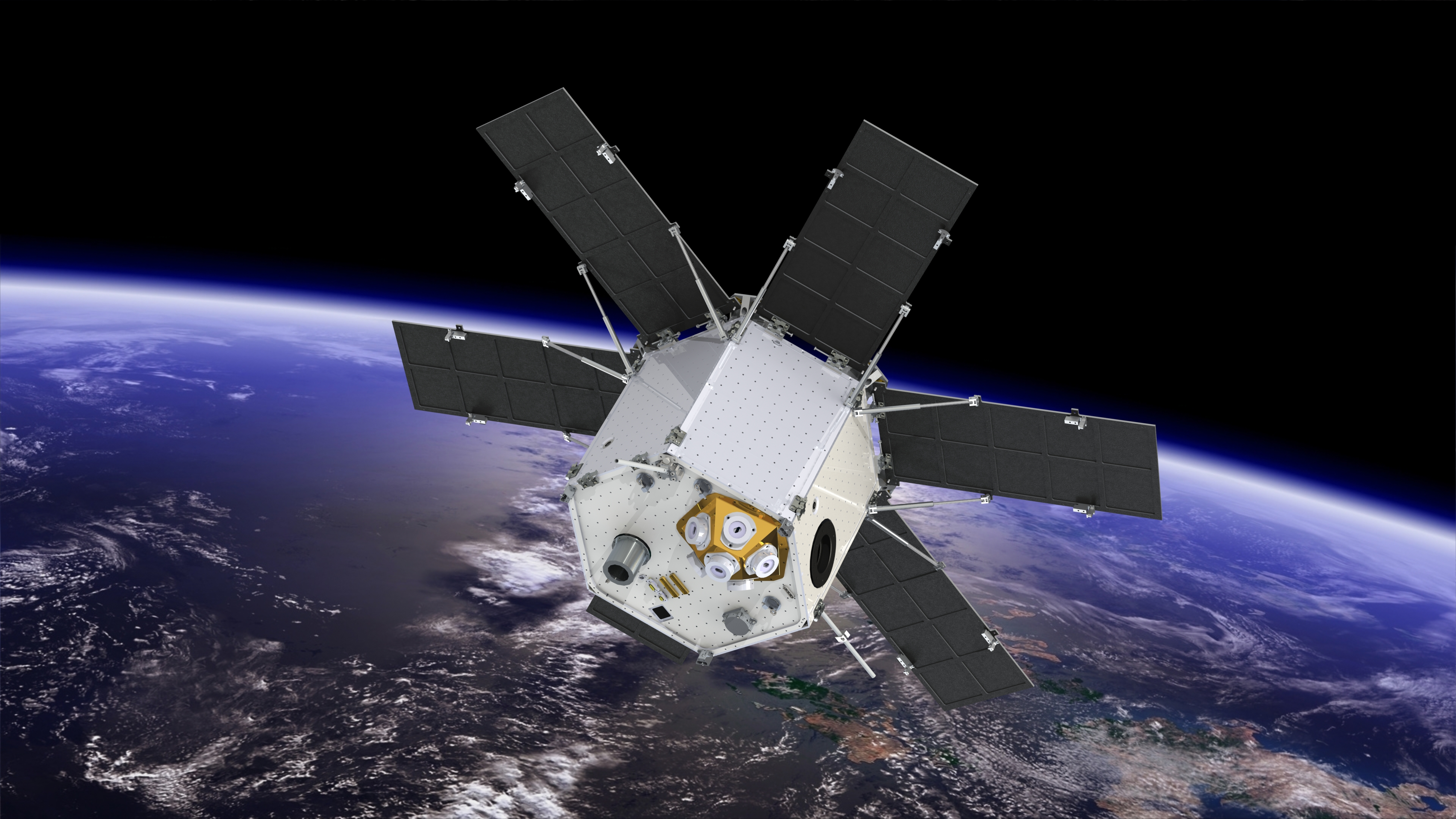
- Mission type: Technology demonstration Earth observation
- Operator: Sputnix
- COSPAR ID: 2014-033H
- SATCAT no.: 40017
- Website: At sputnix.ru (Russian)
- Mission duration: Elapsed: 11 years, 4 months, 27 days

Spacecraft properties
- Launch mass: 26.2 kg (58 lb)

Start of mission
- Launch date: 19 June 2014, 19:11 UTC
- Rocket: Dnepr
- Launch site: Dombarovsky

Orbital parameters
- Reference system: Geocentric
- Eccentricity: 0
- Perigee altitude: 620 km (390 mi)
- Apogee altitude: 620 km (390 mi)
- Inclination: 97.9°

TabletSat-Aurora is a Russian micro-satellite launched in 2014. The satellite is built in shape of hexagonal prism, with 6 foldable solar panels. It is claimed to be the first privately developed satellite in the Russian Federation.

== Launch ==
TabletSat-Aurora was launched from Dombarovsky site 13, Russia, on 19 June 2014 by a Dnepr rocket. Two-way communication with Earth was successfully established soon after launch.

== Mission ==
It intended to verify technologies for the future satellite constellation Earth observation technologies Main payload is the panchromatic photo camera capable of 15m resolution at nadir.

== See also ==
- 2014 in spaceflight
