= Rincon 1 =

Cubesat built at the University of Arizona

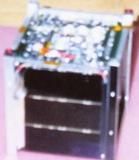
Rincon 1

Rincon 1 was a CubeSat built by the Student Satellite Program of the University of Arizona. The primary payload was furnished by Rincon Research, hence the name. Rincon 1 was the product of the work of about 50 students, ranging from college freshmen to Ph.D. students, over the course of several years. It was launched, after being postponed several times, on board a Dnepr on July 26, 2006, but the rocket failed and the satellite was destroyed.

== Listening ==
If the launch had been successful, persons on the ground would have needed this information to be able to hear the beacons from the satellite.

1. The keplerian elements, in order to know where the satellite is pointed.
2. A radio capable of operating on 436.870 MHz, which will change with doppler shifting. There is also a beacon operating on 437.345 MHz. It is a very weak signal.
3. A 1200 baud AFSK modem, preferably a very low-end, that does no modulation on its own. Cubesat Ground Station uses a custom-built hardware modem, and possibly a software modem (using the sound card as an Analog-to-Digital converter).
4. The Cubesat GS software would help, however, it is not currently available to the public.
5. A good antenna system, the design of the antennas is not optimal.

== Components ==
Rincon 1 had the following components included:

- 6 solar cells
- Aluminum frame - built to spin-stabilize through sunlight
- Power board (used to hold batteries, maintain 5V and 3.3V charges, measure voltages and currents in several spots, and convert the power from the solar cells to usable power.)
- 16-bit microcontroller board with PIC16C277 microchip, which is used to gather and transmit telemetry
- Radio board, which is used for 2 way communication
- Experiment - Contains a 10 mW beacon board, which is being used by Rincon Research to prove new technologies

== Specifications ==
These specifications are without respect to the payload:

- Dimensions - 10 cm×10 cm×10 cm
- Mass - max 1 kg (Actual ~900 grams)
- Power Generation - Optimum ~2 W, average on sun side ~1.5 W
- Max power output - 3W when transmitting data
- Min power output - 400 mW when in a quiet state

== Current status ==
Rincon 1 was launched with UA's satellite, SACRED on a Dnepr rocket on July 26, 2006 at 19:43 UTC. The launch failed shortly after takeoff.

== See also ==
- List of CubeSats
