= OICETS =

Japanese communications demonstration satellite

Optical Inter-orbit Communications Engineering Test Satellite
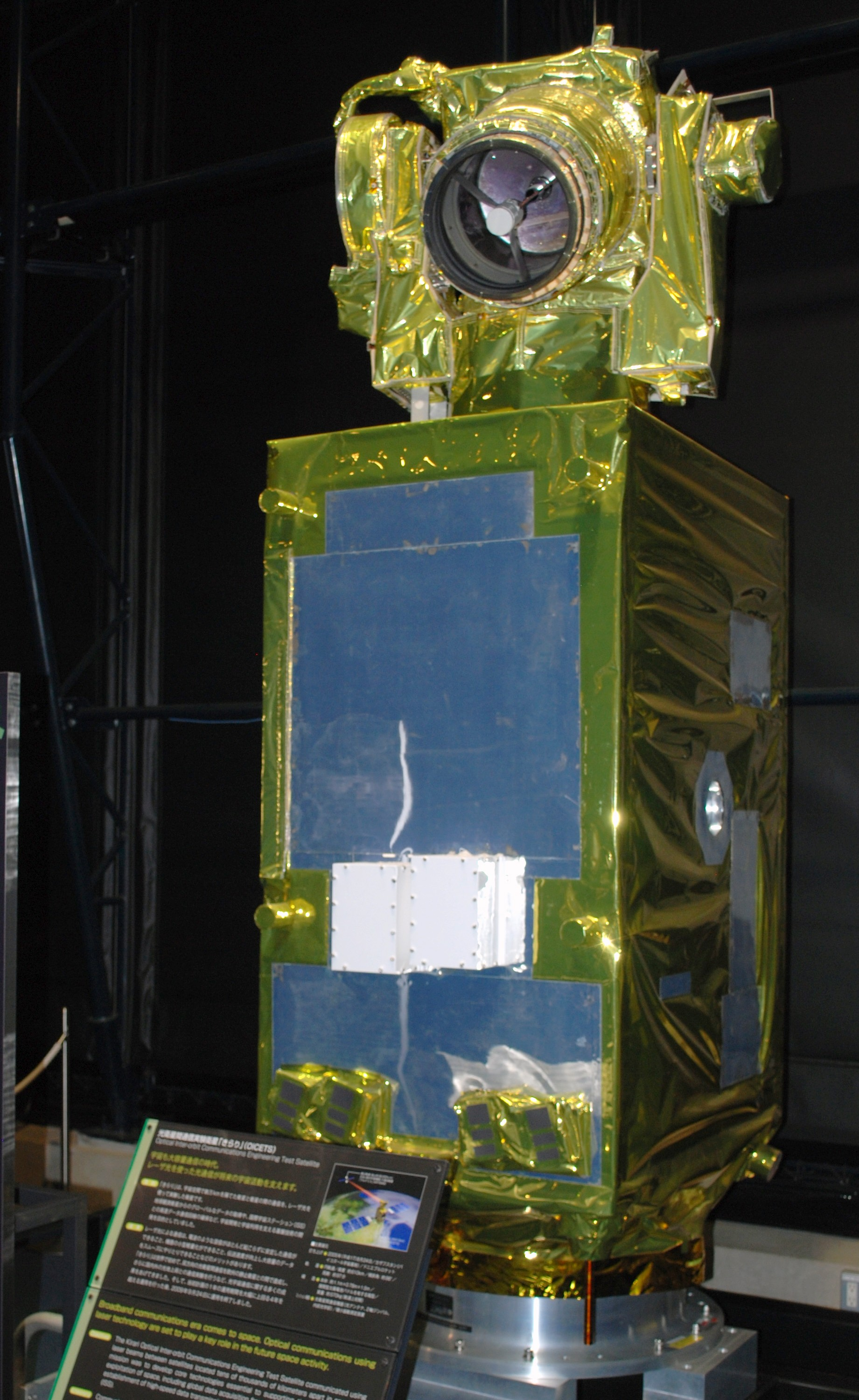
- Names: OICETS, Kirari
- Mission type: Technology demonstration
- Operator: JAXA
- COSPAR ID: 2005-031A
- SATCAT no.: 28809
- Website: global.jaxa.jp/projects/sat/oicets/index.html
- Mission duration: Planned: 1 year Final: 4 years, 1 month

Spacecraft properties
- Manufacturer: Toshiba
- Launch mass: 570 kg (1,260 lb)
- Dimensions: 0.78 × 1.1 × 1.5 m (2.6 × 3.6 × 4.9 ft)

Start of mission
- Launch date: 23 August 2005, 21:10 UTC
- Rocket: Dnepr
- Launch site: Baikonur Pad 109/95
- Contractor: ISC Kosmotras

End of mission
- Disposal: Decommissioned
- Deactivated: 24 September 2009, 05:48 UTC

Orbital parameters
- Reference system: Geocentric
- Regime: Low Earth
- Eccentricity: 0.00107
- Perigee altitude: 597 km (371 mi)
- Apogee altitude: 612 km (380 mi)
- Inclination: 97.8°
- Period: 96.8 minutes
- Epoch: 23 August 2005, 17:10:00 UTC
Instruments
- LUCE: Laser-Utilizing Communications Equipment
- MVE: Micro Vibration Equipment

The Optical Inter-orbit Communications Engineering Test Satellite (OICETS), also called Kirari, was an experimental satellite launched by JAXA to demonstrate interorbital communication between satellites through optical (laser) means. OICETS was originally slated for a launch on the second J-I launcher. Due to problems with that launcher, the launch had to be put on hold. Using the H-IIA was out of question: it would have been overkill to use the H-IIA to send a 570 kilograms (1,260 lb) satellite into low Earth orbit, and there was no budget for another H-IIA launch. Finally, in order to be able to perform the tests during the lifetime of the European Artemis satellite (since 2014, sold to Avanti Communications to exploit its Ka, S, and L-band payloads), OICETS was successfully launched on a Russian-Ukrainian Dnepr rocket.

The satellite was decommissioned and its mission terminated on 24 September 2009 at 05:48 UTC.

== Achievements ==
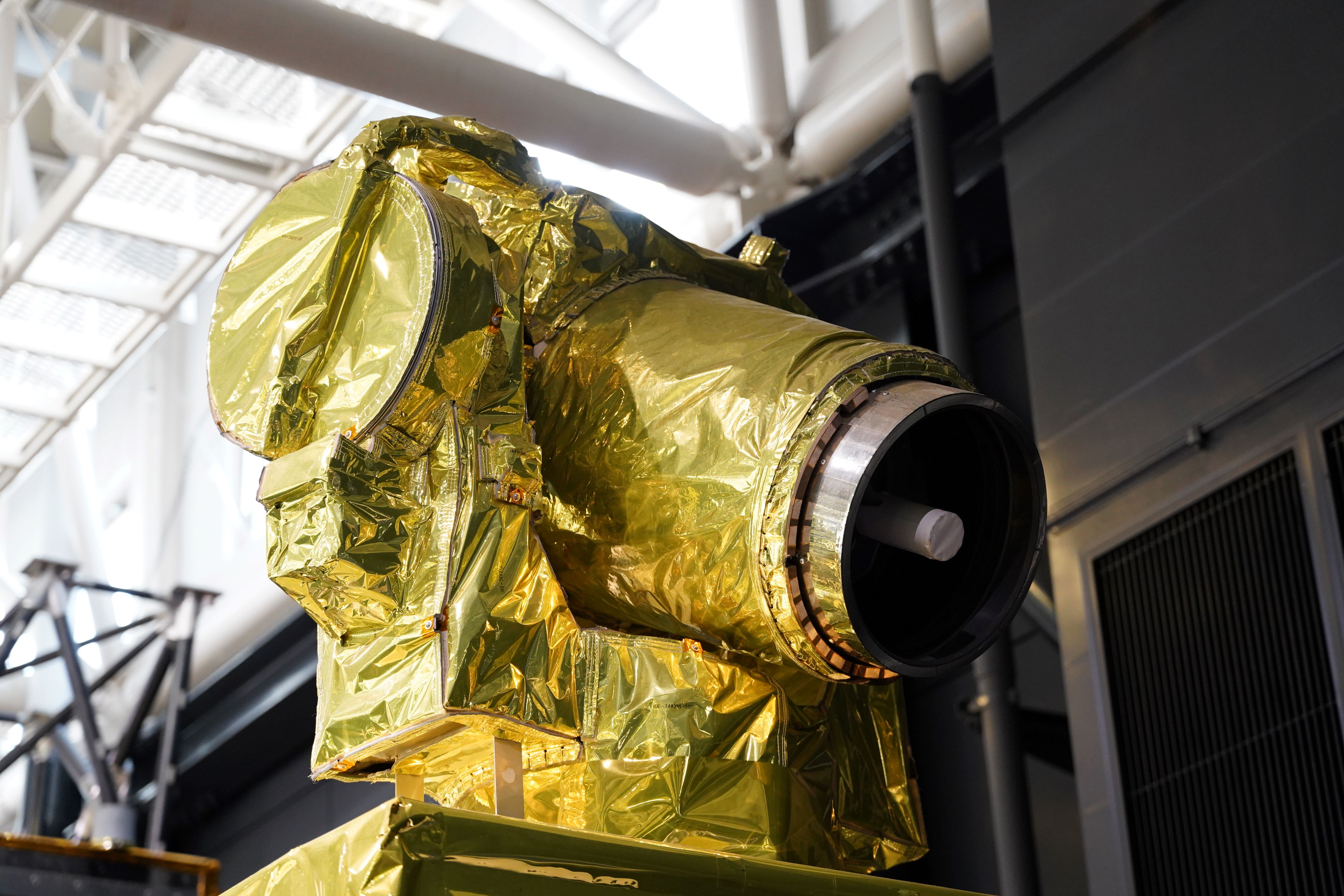
OICETS LUCE Engineering model

- On 9 December 2005, JAXA succeeded in establishing optical links between OICETS and Artemis.
- During March 2006, a successful link between OICETS and a ground station in Japan was established. This was the first optical links connection between a fixed ground station and an LEO satellite.
- On 7 June 2006, JAXA established a communication link between OICETS and a mobile ground station operated by the German Aerospace Center (DLR).
