= Perseus-M =

Russian-American cubesat

- Mission type: Maritime surveillance
- Operator: Aquila Space
- COSPAR ID: M1: 2014-033AF; M2: 2014-033AD
- SATCAT no.: M1: 40039; M2: 40037
- Mission duration: 11 years, 6 months and 12 days (ongoing)

Spacecraft properties
- Manufacturer: Elecnor Deimos

Start of mission
- Launch date: 19 June 2014; 11 years ago
- Rocket: Dnepr
- Launch site: Dombarovsky

Orbital parameters
- Reference system: Geocentric
- Eccentricity: 0
- Perigee altitude: 620 km (390 mi)
- Apogee altitude: 620 km (390 mi)
- Inclination: 97.9°

Perseus-M is a pair of microsatellite developed by Russian-American company Dauria Aerospace and launched in 2014. The satellite is built in 6U Cubesat bus (0.3x0.2x0.1m), optimized for piggy-back launch. All instruments are powered by solar cells mounted on the one side of spacecraft, providing approximately 6W average power.

== Launch ==
Perseus-M1 and Perseus-M2 were launched from Dombarovsky site 13, Russia, on 19 June 2014 by a Dnepr rocket. Telemetry beacons were received and decoded by multiple amateur ground station operators starting on 6 July 2014.

== Mission ==
The satellites are intended primarily for radio-frequency maritime surveillance under contract with Russian Federation.

== See also ==
- 2014 in spaceflight
