= TransOrbital =

American lunar exploration company

TransOrbital is a California-based company which became the first private company granted permission by the U.S. government to explore, photograph, and land on the Moon. The company has been covered in over 2,000 news articles worldwide, and announced a sponsorship agreement with Hewlett-Packard in 2003. The company planned to launch the TrailBlazer lunar orbiter, which was proposed as the first privately-financed science mission to the Moon. The Trailblazer will provide live streaming video of the entire mission, pictures of Earth from space, detailed maps of the full Moon surface, photographs of Apollo landing sites including Apollo 11, the dramatic Earthrise; video and a mission ending live HDTV video broadcast of the spacecraft as it "Barn-Storms" over the lunar terrain during its voyage.

TransOrbital launched a test spacecraft named Trailblazer (also Trailblazer 2, TrailBlazer Test, COSPAR 2002-058E, SATCAT 27609) into orbit in 2002 aboard a Dnepr launch vehicle. The satellite is a 420 kg (930 lb) test article that orbits the Earth every 97 minutes.
