= Sich-2 =

Ukrainian Earth observation satellite

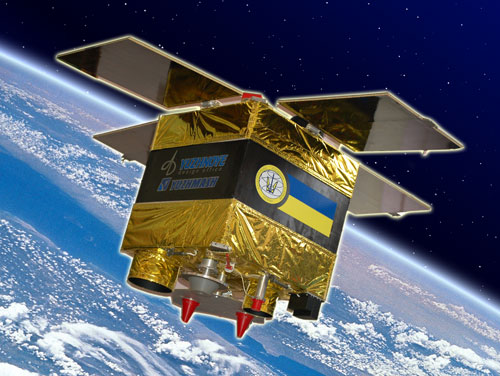
- Operator: State Space Agency of Ukraine
- COSPAR ID: 2011-044G
- SATCAT no.: 37794

Start of mission
- Launch date: 17 August 2011
- Rocket: Dnepr
- Launch site: Yasny

End of mission
- Last contact: 12 December 2012
- Sich satellite series

Sich-2 was an Earth observation satellite operated in low Earth orbit by the State Space Agency of Ukraine between 2011 and 2012. Its observations were used by Ukraine for managing agriculture and forestry, as well as in environmental monitoring. The satellite also contributed to the study of space weather. The satellite was launched in August 2011 aboard the Ukrainian Dnepr rocket from Dombarovsky air base (Yasny) and stopped operating in December 2012 after experiencing power supply issues.
