= Hodoyoshi 3 =

Japanese micro-satellite launched in 2014

Hodoyoshi-3
- Mission type: Earth observation
- Operator: NESTRA
- COSPAR ID: 2014-033F
- SATCAT no.: 40015
- Website: At u-Tokyo.ac.jp
- Mission duration: 4458 days (ongoing)

Spacecraft properties
- Manufacturer: University of Tokyo
- Launch mass: 60 kg (130 lb)

Start of mission
- Launch date: 19:11, June 19, 2014 (UTC)
- Rocket: Dnepr
- Launch site: Dombarovsky
- Contractor: ISC Kosmotras

Orbital parameters
- Reference system: Geocentric
- Regime: Low Earth
- Eccentricity: 0
- Perigee altitude: 600 km (370 mi)
- Apogee altitude: 600 km (370 mi)
- Inclination: 97.9°

Hodoyoshi-3 is a Japanese micro-satellite launched in 2014. The satellite is built in 0.5x0.5x0.65m box-shape bus, optimized for piggy-back launch. All instruments are powered by solar cells mounted on the spacecraft body and two stub wings, with estimated electrical power of 50W. For orbit-keeping, a hydrogen peroxide thruster is used. The satellite was developed under the Funding Program for World-Leading Innovation R&D on Science and Technology.

== Launch ==
Hodoyoshi-3 was launched from Dombarovsky (air base) site 13, Russia, on 19 June 2014 by a Dnepr rocket. Two-side communication with Earth was successfully achieved at 2nd pass over ground station.

== Mission ==
The satellite is intended primarily for technology verification in space, main test piece being 2 Earth observation cameras with nominal 40 m GSD (Middle resolution camera: MCAM) and 200 m GSD (Low resolution camera: LCAM). MCAM is performing the spectroscopic observation of near-infrared rays, red, and three green bands by adopting a multi-band pass filter as a spectrum filter. Normalized Difference Vegetation Index(NDVI) drawn using near-infrared rays and a red band, It is well used to evaluation of the degrees of growth, such as agricultural products and trees, and soundness, and broad-based mapping of a vegetation index is attained by using the spectrum picture which MCAM acquires. Secondary mission is measurements of water level in rivers to monitor floods by using Store&Forward System. Third mission is Hosted Payload. Hosted Payload mission consisted of 10 cm-cubic boxes on which users could install their own apparatuses for their own applications. Project members asked users in private partnership such as Sanrio corporation in order to explore new market of satellite utilization.

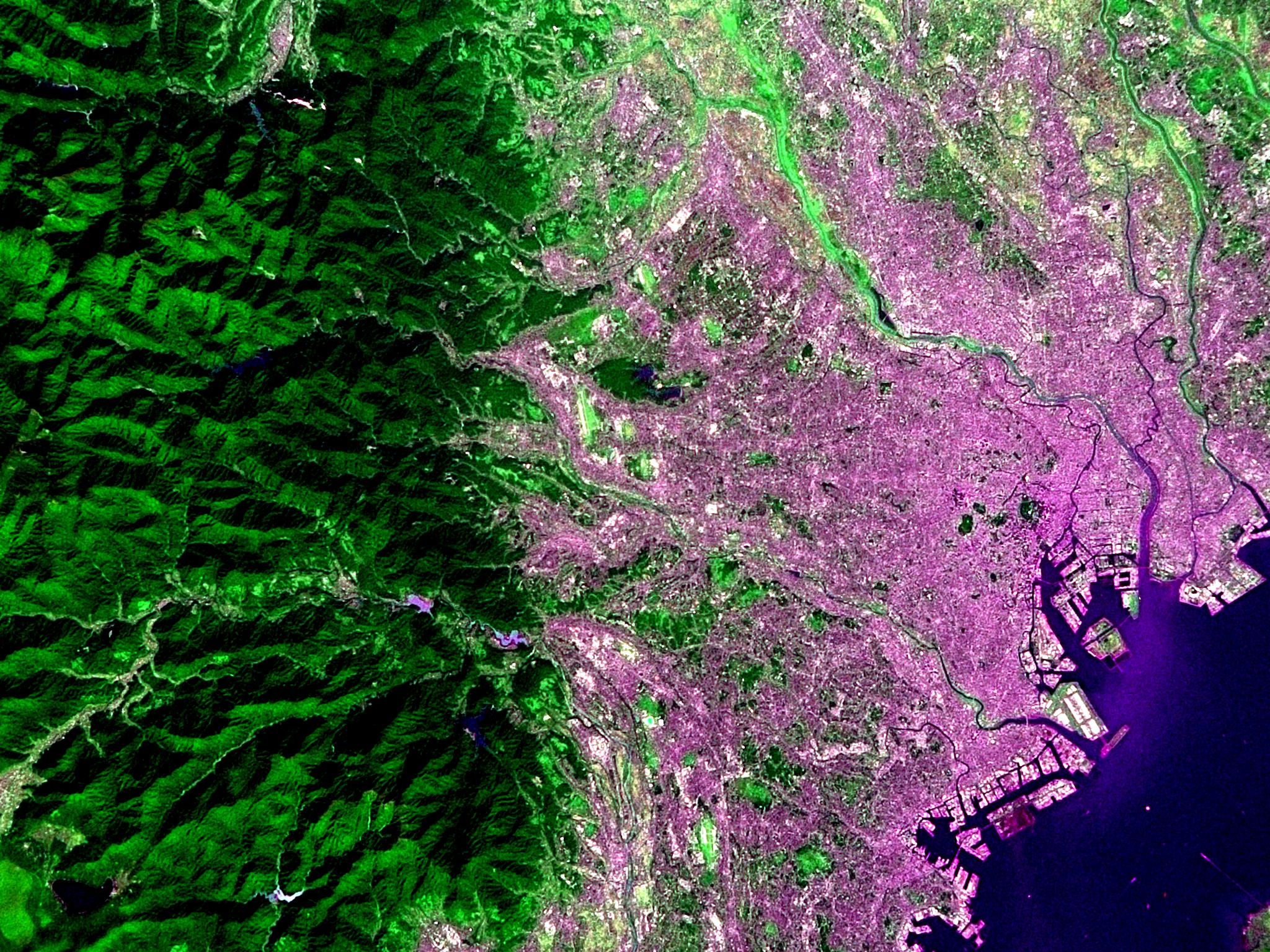
Tokyo Japan taken by Hodoyoshi-3 Satellite

== Private Partnership ==
Hello Kitty, Looking at Earth out a window on the Hodoyoshi-3

The satellite also included private/public partnership in the form of Hello Kitty, a popular character of the Sanrio corporation, on the satellite Hosted Payload box. Hello Kitty looks out a window of the craft to a view of Earth. Electronic message display was installed which operators could change characters on the display by sending commands from the ground station. Users can take photos of their messages with Hello Kitty figure and the view of the earth from the window. The inclusion is an attempt to get more private Japanese companies working with satellites and it is hoped will boost enthusiasm for space among Hello Kitty's many fans.

== See also ==
- 2014 in spaceflight
- Hodoyoshi 4
