= Nanosat 01 =

Spanish nanosatellite launched in 2004

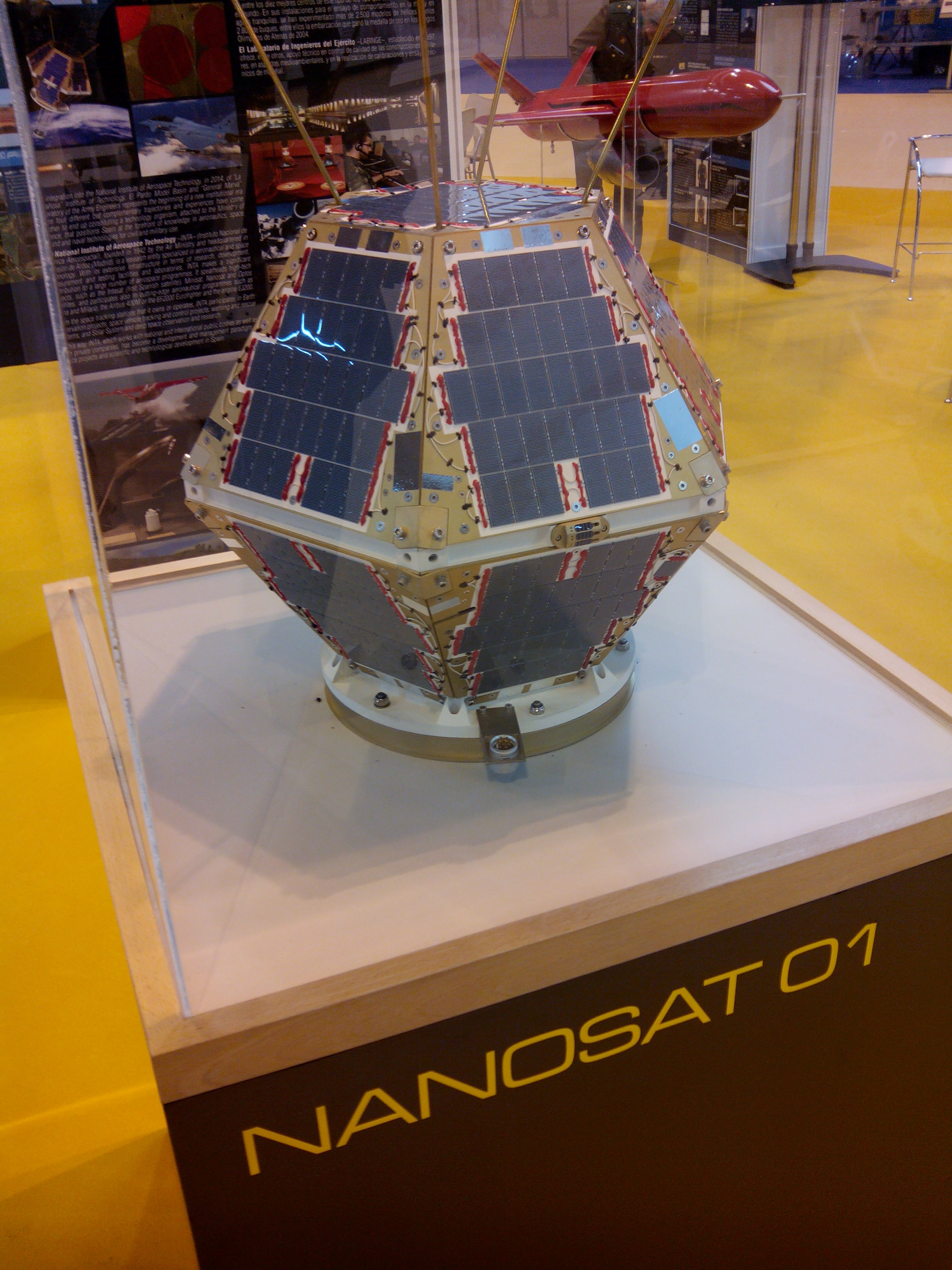
- Replica of the Nanosat 01 at Homsec, Madrid
- Operator: INTA
- COSPAR ID: 2004-049B
- SATCAT no.: 28493
- Mission duration: 4 years

Spacecraft properties
- Manufacturer: INTA, ESA, CSIC
- Dry mass: 19 kg
- Power: 17 W

Start of mission
- Launch date: 18 December 2004
- Rocket: Ariane 5 G+
- Launch site: Guiana Space Centre

Orbital parameters
- Altitude: 656.5 km
- Periapsis altitude: 654.2 km
- Apoapsis altitude: 658.7 km
- Inclination: 98.1º
- Period: 97.7 minutes

Payload
- ACS, Earth magnetic nanosensor, Solar sensors, OWLS
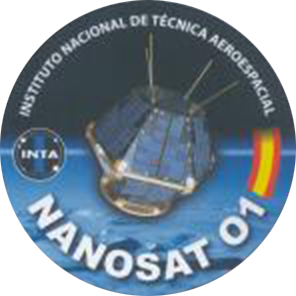

The Nanosat 01, sometimes written as NanoSat-1 or NanoSat 01, was an artificial satellite developed by the Spanish Instituto Nacional de Técnica Aeroespacial (INTA) and launched 18 December 2004. Considered a nano satellite for its weight of less than 20 kg, its main mission was forwarding communications between far reaching points of the Earth such as Juan Carlos I Antarctic Base from mainland Spain. This was possible due to its polar orbit and altitude of 650 km above sea level. During an operational run the data obtained in the Antarctic would be uploaded to the satellite during its fly by and then, downloaded in Spain when satellite reached the Iberian Peninsula.

When its service life came to an end in 2009, it was replaced by the Nanosat-1B, also developed by INTA.

== Mission ==
Nanosat 01 was a low-cost technology demonstration nano satellite. Consequently, the main objective was for INTA to get involved and familiarized with all aspects of nanotechnology development. With that in mind, the satellite was equipped with new magnetic and solar sensors, store-and-forward communications modules, and navigation and reading instruments. Most of them to space-qualify according to ASIC.

In addition, while in orbit the satellite was to perform four experiments:

- Demonstrating functionality of the new ACS (Attitude Control Subsystem).
- Performing a series of readings on Earth's magnetic field with a new Sol–Gel nanosensor.
- Testing on the Solar sensors and powering panels.
- Maintaining communications between different points of Earth by employing the OWLS (Optical Wireless Links for intra-Satellite).

== Body ==
The satellite has a prismatic body divided in two hemispheres, each with its own hexagonal base and six trapezoidal sides with an overall structure roughly shaped like a sphere. From base to base the satellite measures 600 mm with a maximum radius of 540 mm. Almost all of its surface is covered with GaAs/Ge solar panels in order to power the different systems (17 W by average, 20 W at most) which were glued to aluminum panels anchored to the structure. In addition it also carried Lithium-ion batteries capable of providing 4.8 Ah of energy operations without direct sunlight.

The inside of the Nanosat 01 was accessible by separating both "hemispheres" joined by means of a central hexagon bus connecting all the subsystems. These include: the OBDH (On-Board Data Handling) which provided all spacecraft control, processing power and interfacing (based on a DragonBall MC68332 microcontroller of 4 MB of storage capacity, 8 kB PROM, 512 kB EEPROM, 768 kB of protected RAM), the PDU (Power Distribution Unit), RF communications, the ACS (Attitude Control Subsystem) which employed solar cells and a magnetometer to determine attitude and provide spin stability.

To keep the dead weight to a minimum, INTA, in cooperation with ESA, developed an experimental replacement for traditional wiring using optical infrared arrays, known as OWLS, to exchange data between the different modules. The final weight of the satellite ended up being about 19 kg with a projected service life of 3 years. However most of its subsystems remained operational for 4 years.

=== RF communications ===
The RF communications subsystem employed 4 omnidirectional antennas allocated on the top face. Two digital modems were implemented for experimentation purposes; one using a single DSP chip, the other based on an ASIC design. Communications with the outside were store and forward using UHF band (387.1 MHz downlink, 400 MHz uplink with GMSK modulation and Viterbi encoding). Ground access was based on TDMA protocol using Slotted ALOHA with a download speed of 24 kbit/s. The system was capable of self-updating.

== Launch ==
The launch of Nanosat 01 took place on 18 December 2004 on an Ariane-5 G+ rocket (as a "piggy-back" ASAP launch) from Guiana Space Centre. The launch involved multiple satellites being the primary payload the Helios-IIA for DGA, along with 4 Essaim microsatellites (1 to 4), PARASOL and the Nanosat 01.

It was placed in a Sun-synchronous orbit with mean altitude of 656.5 km (654.2 km of perigee and 658.7 km of apogee), an inclination of 98.1º and a period of 97.7 minutes, LTAN (Local Time on Ascending Node) at 13:00 hours and semi-major axis of 7,027 km. It also has a RCS of 0.2736 m^{2}.

During its active life it was monitored by INTA in its Torrejón de Ardoz headquarters.

== Experiments ==
=== Attitude Control Subsystem ===
The ACS was relatively simple since the satellite construction made precise attitude control mostly unnecessary (the panels are mounted on the surface of the whole body and the antennas are omnidirectional with no other subsystem requiring precise pointing to achieve its goals). Nonetheless, it used six solar cells, three electric motors (armed with magneto-coils) and a brand new sensor assembly.

The sensor assembly was COTS (Commercial-off-the-Shelf) and miniaturized because of the need to keep the weight as low as possible. It contained two biaxial sensor units, refereed as AMR (Anisotropic Magnetic Resistor), with two redundant PCBs equipped with radiation-hardened proximity electronics and two photoelectric cells. Although conventional, this solution provided moderate detection sensitivity (around 3 mV/V/G), good resolution (3 μG) and an acceptable operational range for measuring the geomagnetic field (0.1 mT - 1 nT). It was also selected to test its capabilities during spaceborne operations. Consisting of 4 Honeywell sensors (HMC1201) in cubic configuration, the AMR was capable of measuring with a resolution of 1 mG consuming less than 2 W and with a total weight of 0.22 kg.

During conventional flight conditions, the ACS would maintain the spin axis perpendicular to the orbital plane and in the anti-clockwise direction. To ensure a service life as long as possible, an operational spin rate between 3 and 6 rpm was chosen with corrections to the satellite's position applied non-continuously once a week.

=== Earth magnetic nanosensor ===
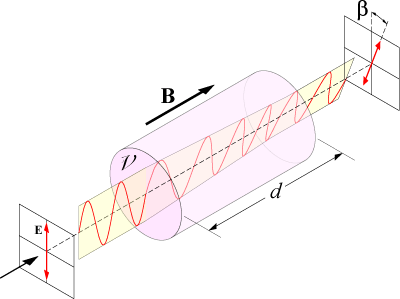
Faraday effect.

As a prove of concept, INTA designed and developed a magneto-optical compass based on the Faraday effect capable of accurately measure Earth's magnetic field. The centerpiece of the device was a Sol–Gel Faraday rotor, consisting in several rods of a dispersion of γ-Fe_{2}O_{3} nanoparticles (less than 15 nm in size) suspended in an amorphous silica lattice. These rods were stacked inside a polarimetric dome (itself being composed of several layers of polarizers) responsible of directing light beams produced by a LED towards the rods longitudinally. When the light propagated inside the rods along their axis, the magnetic field created by the austenite nanoparticles would interact with it causing the rotation of the polarizers. This rotation would be perceived as change in the intensity of the light measured by four photodiodes allocated new to the exiting end of each rod. The data collected by the photodetectors would then be processed in the OBDH which was capable of providing accurate readings (up to 10 nT) on both the satellite's attitude and the value of the geomagnetic field.

The usage of the silica / γ-Fe_{2}O_{3} composite was driven by the search of a material capable of providing good mechanical properties with a high degree of transparency, high Verdet constant and superparamagnetism in order to avoid remnant magnetism and facilitate measuring the intensity of the light.

In addition, it contained several coils designed to compensate possible variations of Verdet constant due to changes in temperature or wavelength inside the sensor. And a stabilized power source for the LED. Both subsystems were also used when calibrating the sensor midflight. The device had a diameter of 20 mm and less than 5 mm in thickness with a total weight of 200 g with less than 2 W of power consumption.

Its conception was the result of more than 7 years of joint research between the Instituto de Ciencia de Materiales de Madrid (ICMM subdivision of the CSIC) and INTA. It was reported that represented the first application of a Sol–Gel based technology in the aerospace industry and an important step forwards in further miniaturization of the satellites.

=== Solar sensors ===
Two independent groups of photosensors composed of Si cells and miniature AsGa/Ge cells were put into service in order to test their performance and viability in further projects and provide a consistent framework about the Sun's position for the spin stabilizer. The latter was achieved by measuring voltage (0-10 V) induced in the cells as it was directly proportional to the sunlight incidence. The cells were strategically allocated in two groups of three along the outermost edges and the signals contrasted to give a precise location for the Sun (up to 5º of nutation angle error).

Since both types of cell shared the same input/output channels, they could not be operated simultaneously, however, an automated conditioning system ensured the best cells were selected at any given time.

=== Optical Wireless Links for intra-Satellite ===
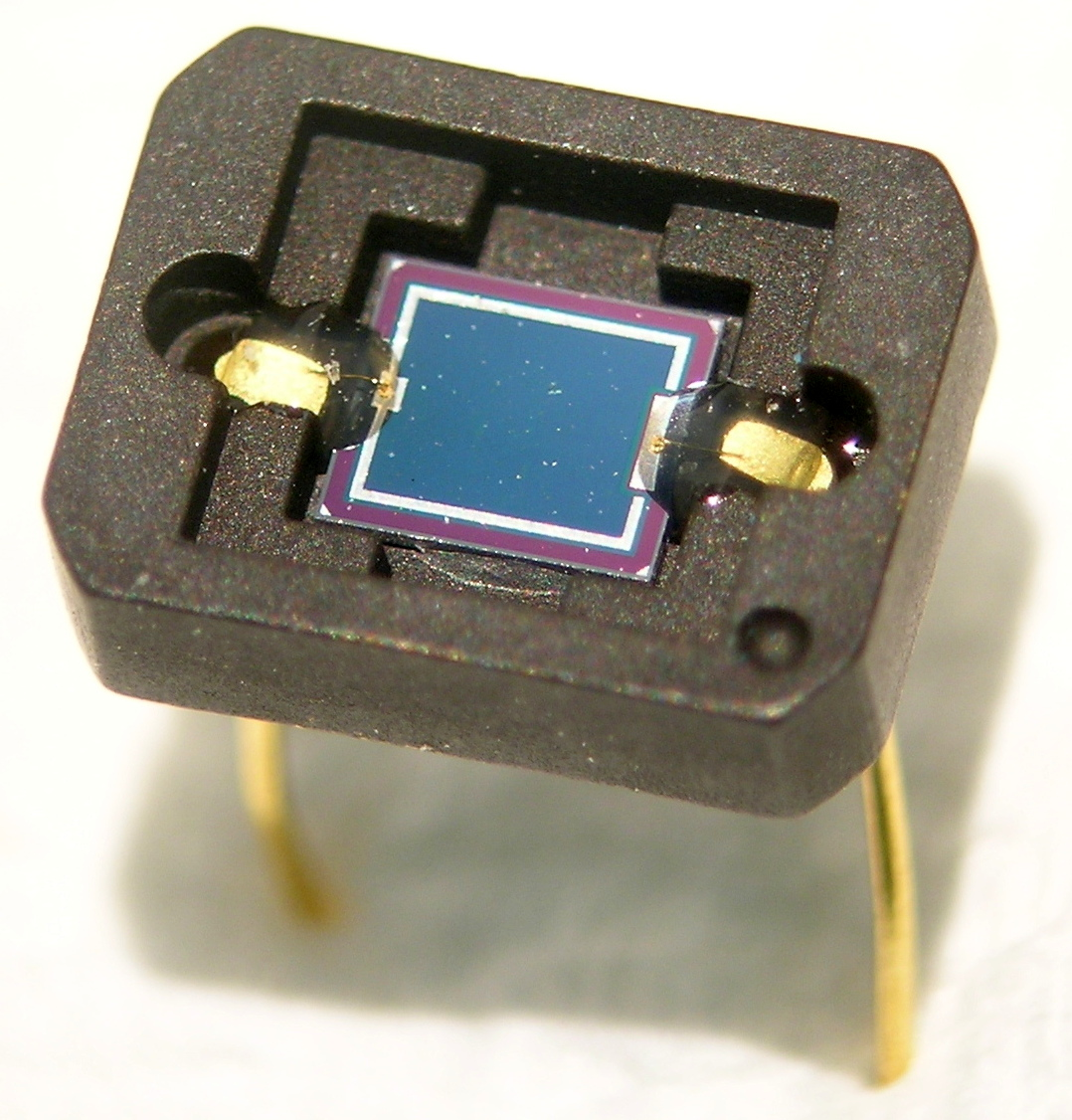
Close-up of a photodiode.

Referred to as OWLS, the internal communication system was developed in conjunction with ESA to test the possibilities of diffuse infrared communications and BER (Bit Error Rate) monitoring in spacial applications. Hence the main objectives were to perform in-orbit demonstrations for wireless applications, and to observe the peculiarities of the working environment and their effect on the system. It was reported as the first ever use of that technology on space. The system was based on commercial components heavily modified to adapt them to the mission, which was centered on two experiments:

==== First Experiment ====
The first was to provide a reliable link between the OBDH and the ACS, particularly the Honeywell magnetic sensors so it was given the codename OWLS-HNWLL. It combined infrared communication with a redundant wire connection in order to compare results when the readings were computed by the processing unit allowing, in addition to assess the performance of the OWLS, to measure the occurrence of SETs (Single Event Transients), that's to say momentary glitches in the output voltage of a circuit caused by ions passing through sensitive nodes in the circuit, in the optical detectors due to incidence protons.

The wireless linking system was constructed in a WDMA (Wavelength Division Multiple Access) architecture. With the receiving photodiode offering a sensitivity value of 700 nW/cm^{2} with a sensing area of 25 mm^{2}, and 1.5 MHz bandwidth. The emitter's optical peak power was 15 mW.

It was designed to perform V/F (Voltage-Frequency) conversions on the readings given by the sensors and then, transmit the information in stream of pulses during a fixed interval of time. Its size was determined by the signal value. An additional line was added to simulate a zero on the sensor, thus giving, by comparison, the number and nature of the pulses resulted from undesired SETs interacting with the system. This helped further understanding the nature of ionizing radiation in space and filtering the received signal.

==== Second Experiment ====
Known as the OWLS-BER, the second experiment was to perform a closed-loop link in a SPI bus belonging to the OBC. To achieve this, pulses of data were sent from optical emitters towards the inner walls of the satellite, and the diffused light collected by a receiver. When the transmission was over, the OBC compared the data received to the calculations of the BER.

The whole experiment was carried in a separated FDMA (Frequency-Division Multiple-Access) capable channel (4 MHz), equipped with ASK. It was also possible to control from ground and, to a certain extent, filter interferes in the data rate of 100 and 100 kbit/s.

== See also ==
- Nanosat-1B
- Communications satellite
