= Hodoyoshi 4 =

Japanese micro-satellite launched in 2014

Hodoyoshi-4
- Mission type: Earth observation
- Operator: NESTRA
- COSPAR ID: 2014-033B
- SATCAT no.: 40011
- Mission duration: 12 years, 2 months, 14 days (ongoing)

Spacecraft properties
- Manufacturer: University of Tokyo
- Launch mass: 66 kg (146 lb)

Start of mission
- Launch date: 19:11, June 19, 2014 (UTC)
- Rocket: Dnepr
- Launch site: Dombarovsky
- Contractor: ISC Kosmotras

Orbital parameters
- Reference system: Geocentric
- Regime: Low Earth
- Eccentricity: 0
- Perigee altitude: 620 km (390 mi)
- Apogee altitude: 620 km (390 mi)
- Inclination: 97.9°

Hodoyoshi-4 is a Japanese micro-satellite launched in 2014. The satellite is built in 0.5x0.6x0.7m box-shape bus, optimized for piggy-back launch. All instruments are powered by solar cells mounted on the spacecraft body and two stub wings, with estimated electrical power of 50W. For orbit-keeping, a "miniature" (5 kg dry weight) ion thruster with specific impulse of 1100 s and operating power of 20 W is integrated into the body. The satellite was developed under the Funding Program for World-Leading Innovation R&D on Science and Technology.

== Launch ==
Hodoyoshi-4 was launched from Dombarovsky air base site 13, Russia, on 19 June 2014 by a Dnepr rocket. Two-side communication with Earth was successfully achieved at 2nd pass over ground station.

== Mission ==
The satellite is intended primarily for technology verification in space, main test piece being Earth observation telescope with nominal 6.7m ground sample distance GSD at 650 km altitude.

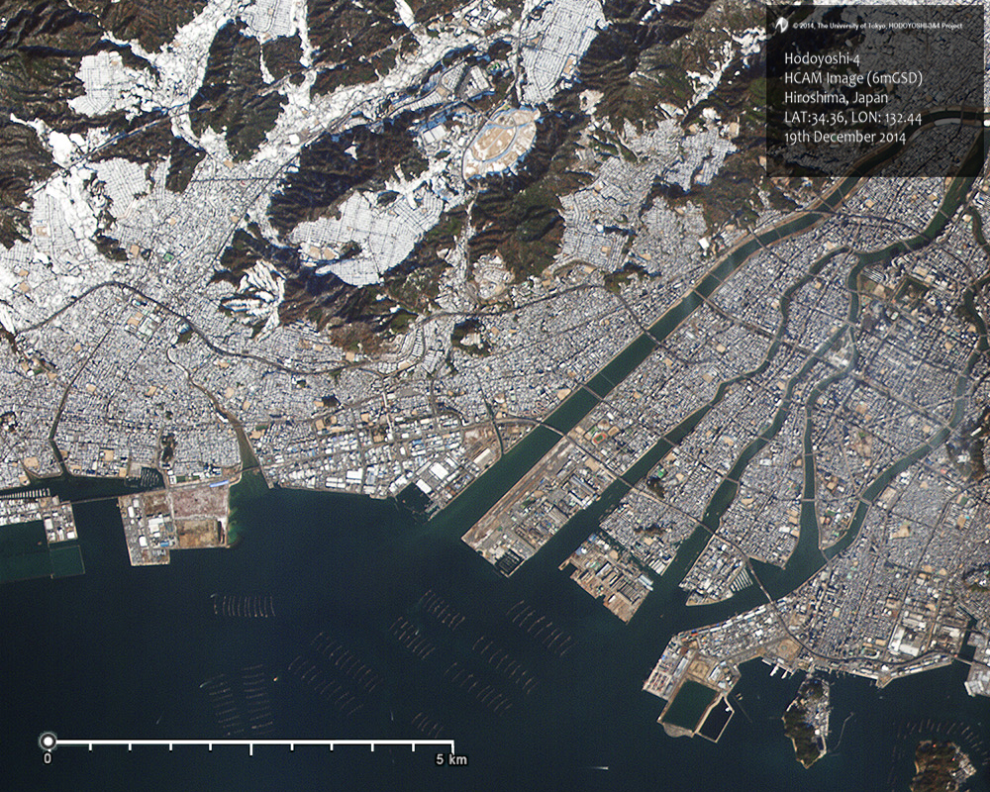
Hiroshima, Japan, taken by Hodoyoshi-4 satellite

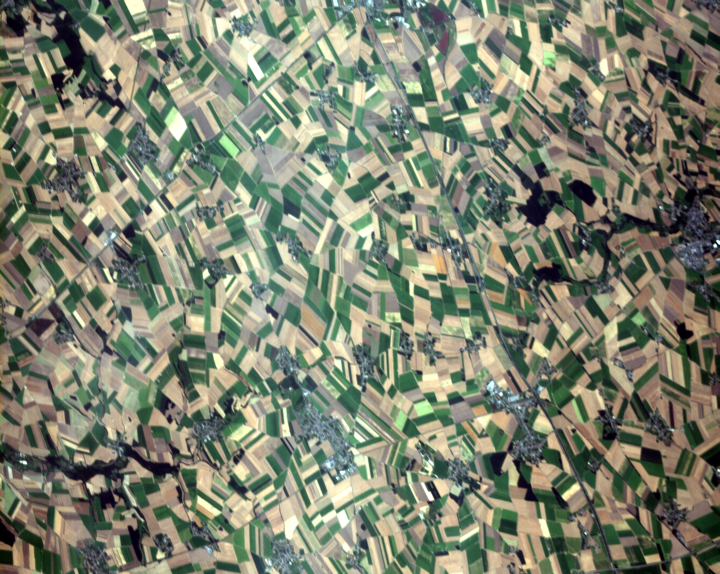
Albert, France taken by Hodoyoshi-4 satellite

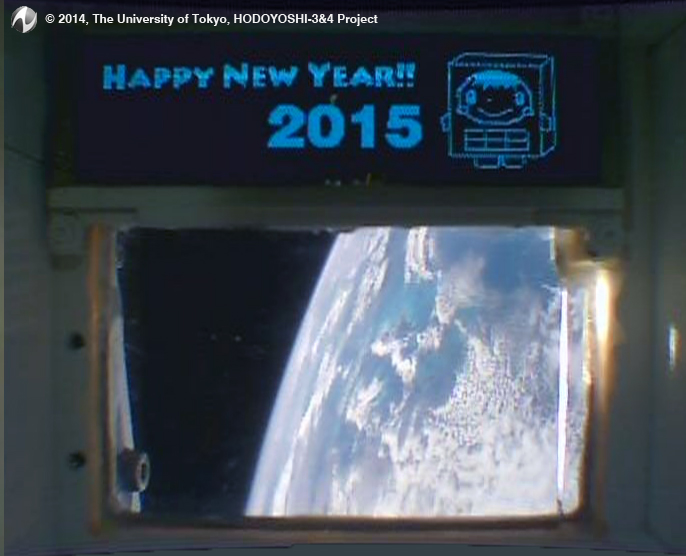
Space Message Display System: Electronic Message Display & Observation Window

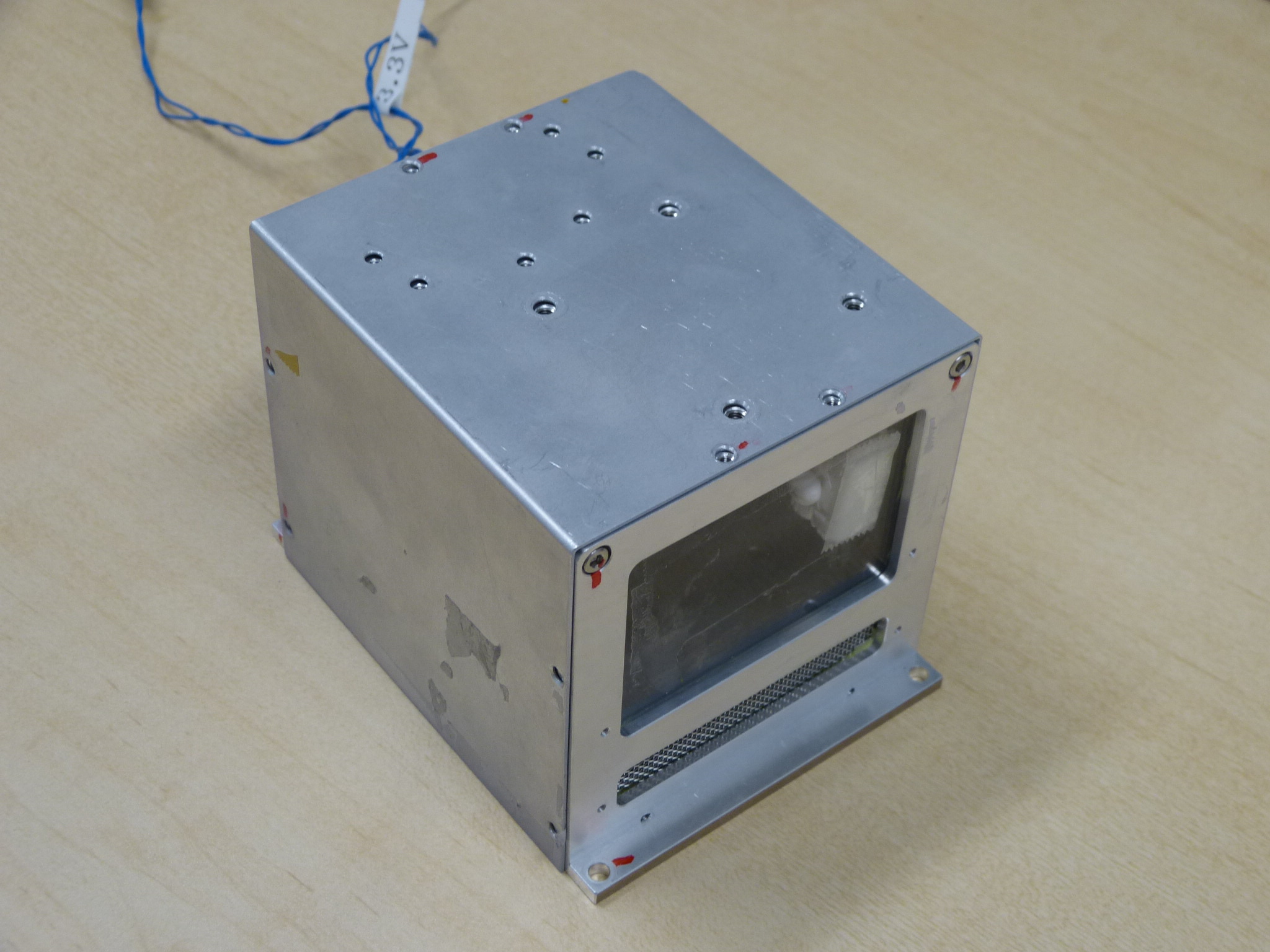
Hosted Payload Box installed on Hodoyoshi-3 & Hodooyshi-4 satellites

Specification of Hodooyshi-4 Earth observation telescope
Item	Value
GSD	5-7m @ 600-650 km
Type	Pushbroom scan
Diameter	150 mm
Focal Length	1,000 mm
Swath	24 km
Format	Raw, 12bit
Band	Blue: 0.45-0.52 μm, Green: 0.52-0.60 μm, Red: 0.63-0.69 μm, NIR: 0.73-0.90 μm

Secondary mission is measurements of water level in rivers to monitor floods by using Store&Forward System. Third mission is Hosted Payload. Hosted Payload mission consisted of 10 cm-cubic boxes on which users could install their own apparatuses for their own applications. Project members asked users in private partnership in order to explore new market of satellite utilization. One of the apparatuses was space message display system. Electronic message display was installed which operators could change characters on the display by sending commands from the ground station. Users can take photos of their messages with the view of the earth from the window.

== See also ==
- 2014 in spaceflight
- Hodoyoshi 3
