= AprizeSat =

American micro-satellite platform for low Earth orbit communications satellites

- Manufacturer: SpaceQuest, Ltd.
- Country of origin: United States
- Operator: SpaceQuest, LatinSat, exactEarth, SpaceQuest
- Applications: Identification and tracking for ships, containers and vehicles

Specifications
- Bus: Aprize
- Launch mass: 13 kg (29 lb)
- Dimensions: 250 mm × 250 mm × 250 mm (9.8 in × 9.8 in × 9.8 in)
- Volume: 0.015 m^{3} (0.53 cu ft)
- Power: 7.7 W minimum
- Equipment: Omnidirectional UHF radio
- Regime: Low Earth orbit
- Design life: 10 years

Production
- Status: Operational
- Built: 12
- Launched: 12
- Maiden launch: 20 December 2002
- Last launch: 19 June 2014

AprizeSat is an American micro-satellite platform for low Earth orbit communications satellites. It is marketed as a low-cost solution, with a claimed cost of US$1.2 million per satellite for a 24-to-48-satellite constellation. As of 2014, twelve spacecraft based on the Aprize bus have been launched.

== Launch history ==
Satellite name	Launch date	Status
LatinSat 1	2002-12-20	Operational
LatinSat 2	2002-12-20	Operational
LatinSat C (AprizeSat 1)	2004-06-29	Operational
LatinSat D (AprizeSat 2)	2004-06-29	Operational
AprizeSat-3	2009-07-29	Operational
AprizeSat-4	2009-07-29	Operational
AprizeSat-5	2011-08-17	Operational
AprizeSat-6	2011-08-17	Operational
AprizeSat-7	2013-11-21	Operational
AprizeSat-8	2013-11-21	Operational
AprizeSat 9	2014-06-19	Operational
AprizeSat 10	2014-06-19	Operational
