= Baikonur Cosmodrome Site 109 =

Launch site at Baikonur Cosmodrome in Kazakhstan

Coordinates: 45.951°N 63.497°E

Site 109/95
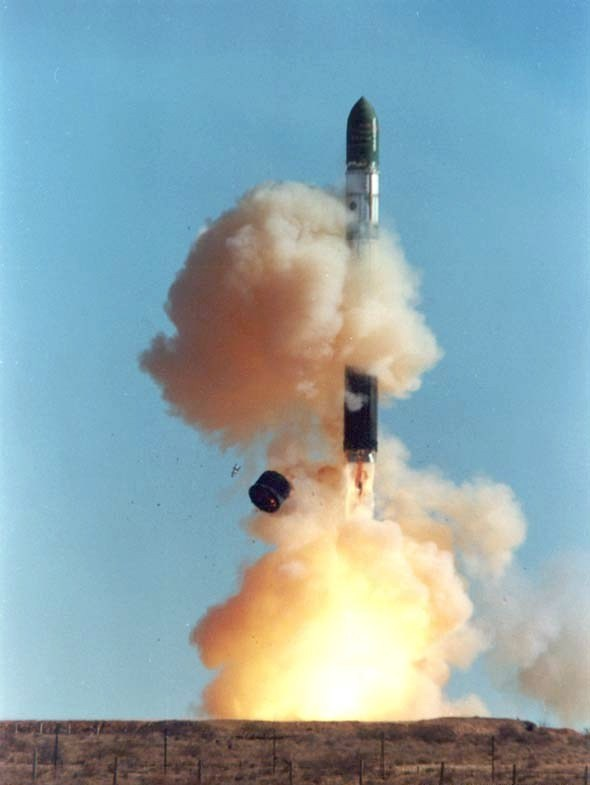
- A Dnepr rocket after being launched from LC-109/95.
- Launch site: Baikonur Cosmodrome
- Short name: LC-109/95
- Operator: RVSN, VKS, Kosmotras
- Total launches: 31
- Launch pad(s): 1
- Orbital inclination range: 49° – 99°
Launch history
- Status: Active
- First launch: 4 July 1974
- Last launch: 21 June 2010
- Associated rockets: R-36; Dnepr

Site 109/95 at the Baikonur Cosmodrome is a missile silo built for use by the R-36 missile, which has been converted into a launch site for the Dnepr carrier rocket.

Nineteen R-36 ICBMs were launched on test flights from Site 109 between its activation in 1974, and deactivation in 1983. It was subsequently reactivated for the Dnepr programme, which uses a modified R-36 missile to place satellites into orbit. The Dnepr made its maiden flight from Site 109 on 21 April 1999. The most recent launch from Site 109 was a Dnepr, with the German TanDEM-X satellite, which was launched on 21 June 2010.
