= ISC Kosmotras =

Space launch services company

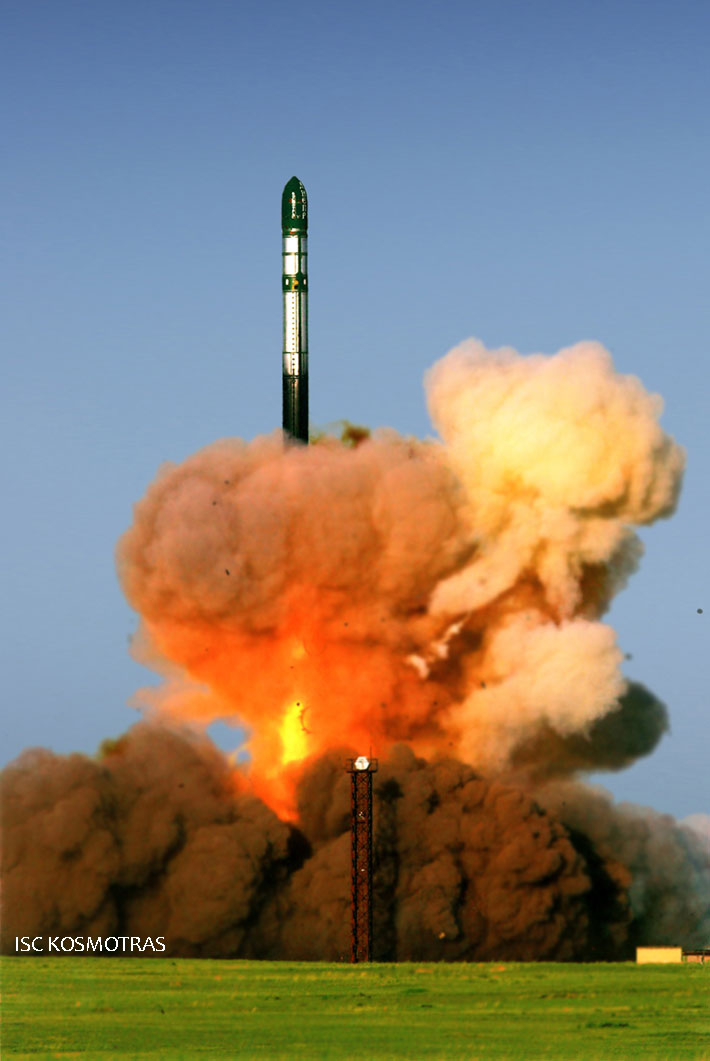
- Type: Joint stock company
- Industry: Commercial spaceflight
- Founded: 1997
- Headquarters: Moscow, Russia
- Website: www.kosmotras.ru

The International Space Company Kosmotras or ISC Kosmotras (Russian: ЗАО Международная космическая компания “Космотрас”, romanized: ZAO Mezhdunarodnaya kosmicheskaya kompaniya "Kosmotras") is a joint project, between Russia, Ukraine, and Kazakhstan, established in 1997. It developed and now operates a commercial expendable launch system using the Dnepr rocket. The Dnepr is a converted decommissioned SS-18 ICBM. ISC Kosmotras conducts Dnepr launches from Baikonur Cosmodrome and Yasny launch base in Dombarovskiy, Russia.

In February 2015, following a year of strained relations as a result of a Russian military intervention into Ukraine, Russia announced that it would sever its "joint program with Ukraine to launch Dnepr rockets". ISC Kosmotras said it would honor its remaining launch contracts. Of the three launches planned for 2015, only one took place. As of 2016, it appears ISC Kosmotras no longer has customers, and thus whether the company is operational or not is uncertain.

In May 2017, ISC Kosmotras formed a joint venture with Glavkosmos named GK Launch Services, which aims to conduct commercial rideshare launches using the Soyuz-2 launch vehicle. The company conducted its first fully-commercial launch on 22 March 2021.

== Company profile ==
Company principal office is located in Moscow, Russia.

ISC Kosmotras project members and their roles:

- Russia (90% stocks ownership)
  - State Space Corporation Roscosmos - state support and supervision, provision of facilities and services at Baikonur Cosmodrome
  - Defence Ministry of the Russian Federation – allocation of SS-18 assets to be converted into Dnepr-1 launch vehicles, SS-18 storage and Dnepr-1 standard launch operations
  - JSC ASKOND (Moscow) – primary entity for Dnepr Program management
  - JSC Rosobschemash Corporation (Moscow) - coordination of SS-18 elimination programs
  - FSUE Design Bureau of Special Machine Building (St. Petersburg) - primary entity for maintenance of launch complex and processing facilities
  - FSUE Central Scientific and Research Institute of Machine Building (Moscow) - scientific and technical support of the program
  - FSUE Scientific and Production Association “IMPULSE” (St. Petersburg) - development and upgrade of launch control and support equipment
  - State Enterprise Moscow Electrical and Mechanical Equipment Plant (Moscow) - modification of launch vehicle control system instrumentation
- Ukraine
  - National Space Agency of Ukraine - state support and supervision
  - State Design Bureau Yuzhnoye - primary design and development organization for the launch vehicle and the entire Dnepr rocket;
  - State Enterprise “Production Association Yuzniy Machine Building Plant” - primary manufacturing entity
  - Scientific and Production Enterprise KHARTRON-ARKOS (Kharkiv) - primary entity for launch vehicle control system
- Kazakhstan (10% stocks ownership)
  - Aerospace Committee of the Ministry of Energy and Mineral Resources - state support and supervision
  - National Company Kazakhstan Garysh Sapary - shareholder from Kazakhstan side
  - State Enterprise “INFRAKOS” (Baikonur) - participation in Dnepr Program activities at Baikonur Cosmodrome
    - State Enterprise “INFRAKOS-EKOS”, a subsidiary of “INFRAKOS” (Alma-Aty) – ecological support of the program.

In 2006 ISC Kosmotras became ISO 9000 and ISO 14000 certified through ISO certification agency Bureau Veritas Quality International (BVQI). ISC Kosmotras received ISO 9001:2000 (Quality Management Systems) and ISO 14001:2004 (Environmental Management Systems) certificates.
