= GAUSS Srl =

Italian company specialising in the development and launch of small satellites

G.A.U.S.S. Srl
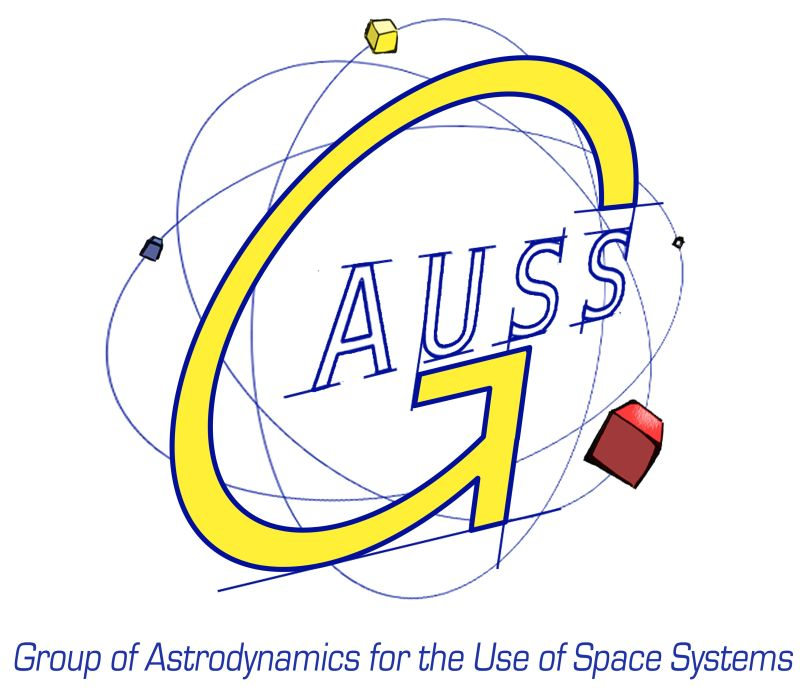
- Company type: Private
- Founded: 2012
- Founder: Filippo Graziani, Chantal Cappelletti, Mauro Pontani
- Headquarters: Rome, Italy
- Number of locations: 1 (2015)
- Area served: Worldwide
- Key people: Filippo Graziani (CEO)
- Number of employees: 10-20
- Website: www.gaussteam.com

G.A.U.S.S. Srl (also known as GAUSS Srl) is an Italian limited liability private company specialized in the development and launch of small satellites, CubeSats and PocketQubes.

The company name is an acronym for "Group of Astrodynamics for the Use of Space Systems".

The company's small satellites are used as launch platforms for third-party satellites. As a private company, it has successfully launched two small satellites, UniSat-5 and UniSat-6.

G.A.U.S.S. Srl business is mainly related to the design and realization of microsatellites, which are also intended as CubeSat, PocketQube and releasing platforms. Several universities and research centers around the world have launched their satellites through the company's UniSat launching platforms, thus letting G.A.U.S.S. being a small satellites launch provider.

G.A.U.S.S. Srl activities include structural design, realization and integration of the main subsystems and payloads and all the ground segment operations.

== History ==
G.A.U.S.S. Srl was founded in 2012 and it originated from the university of Rome research group, GAUSS, established at the Laboratory of Astrodynamics of the chair of Applied Astrodynamics held by Professor Filippo Graziani from 1978 to 2010. It is based in Rome.

G.A.U.S.S. Srl CEO, Filippo Graziani, is a professor of Astrodynamics and member of the International Academy of Astronautics, with over thirty years of activity at the School of Aerospace Engineering of the University of Rome “La Sapienza” along with the two co-founders and his former students, Chantal Cappelletti e Mauro Pontani. The Professor has carried on didactics and training alongside the traditional teaching – mainly focused on the theory and the development of the individual technical capabilities – such as methodologies aiming at developing synthesis planning abilities and able to put into practice what they learned from the theory in a group work, a must in the industrial and research activities.

The scientific and educational mission of the company is also very important: several experiments are boarded on the microsatellites, ranging from space debris observation instruments to space biomedicine.

G.A.U.S.S. Srl is also active in the research regarding Space debris. The company's objective is the satellites and space debris observation for the orbital analysis, the determination of the life time and the improvement of the knowledge of the space environment. The Company recorded an astrographic image of the Tiangong-1 Chinese Space Station on March 31, 2018, which had an extensive media coverage and was broadcast by several Italian and international TV News during the station's descent last phase.

== Satellites ==
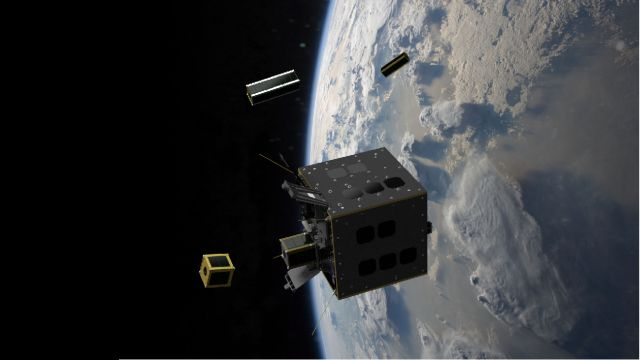
A 3D render showing the deployment phase of the CubeSats boarded inside UniSat-6 satellite, designed and manufactured by G.A.U.S.S. Srl

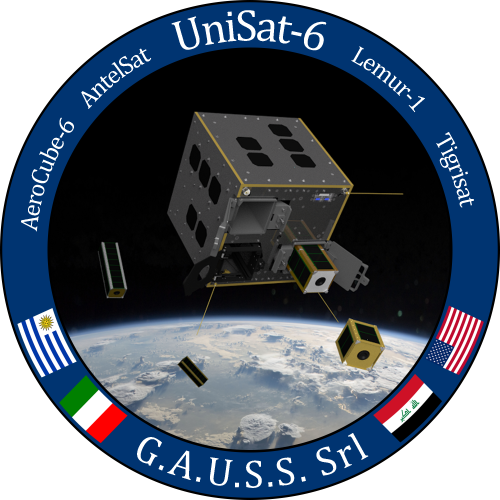
UNISAT-6 Mission Patch

From 2000 to date, G.A.U.S.S. throughout all of its history as university laboratory group, and then private company, has designed, built and launched eight microsatellites: UniSat-1, UniSat-2, UniSat-3, UniSat-4, UniSat-5, UniSat-6, UniCubeSat-GG, EDUSAT.

UniSat-4 failed to reach the orbit, as the Dnepr launcher failed 86 sec after launch.

G.A.U.S.S. group has launched the CubeSat UniCubeSat-GG onboard the VEGA maiden launch on February 13, 2012.

UniSat-5 is the first satellite designed, built and launched by G.A.U.S.S. Srl, the company that inherits the experience gained with the UniSat program at the School of Aerospace Engineering of the University of Rome “La Sapienza”. The spacecraft was inserted into a near-SSO orbit with an altitude of 634 km at 07:25:48 UTC. The launch of UniSat-5 satellite, boarded on the Dnepr rocket, took place on November 21, 2013, from Yasny cosmodrome in Russia, marking an historical event in the world of CubeSats and nanosatellites. UniSat-5 boarded four CubeSats and four PocketQubes.

UniSat-6 was launched on June 19, 2014 at 21:11:11 CET from Dombarovsky Cosmodrome at the Yasny launch base on board a Dnepr rocket from the company Kosmotras, in Russia, and it entered into Sun Synchronous orbit 16 minutes later. Communications with ground controllers were acquired 90 minutes after launch when passing over Italy. The satellite transmits a data beacon at the frequency in the Amateur radio UHF band of 437.425 MHz, and it has several sensors onboard. Data is downloaded by the G.A.U.S.S. Srl groundstation at the company headquarters in Rome.

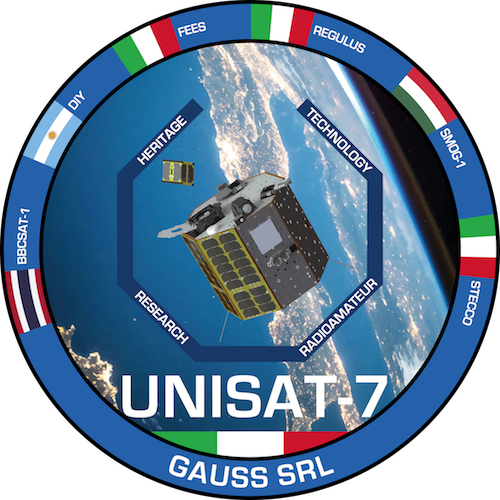
UNISAT-7 Mission Patch

UNISAT-7 was launched in March 2021. The mission had previously suffered several delays caused by the switch of the launcher, from a Dnepr rocket to a Soyuz-2 launch vehicle.

G.A.U.S.S. Srl deployers used in the UniSat launch platform are built to conform to the CubeSat standard. The satellites are then placed in Sun Synchronous Low-Earth Orbit, as the launch platform itself.

=== Satellite List ===
Satellite Name	Configuration	Launch Date	Launch Vehicle	Purpose	CubeSats onboard	PocketQubes onboard
UniSat-5	50*50*50 cm small satellite	2013-11-21	Dnepr	Technology demonstrator, CubeSat and PocketQube Launch Platform	PUCP-Sat-1, ICUBE-1, HUMSAT-D, DOVE-4	Eagle1, Eagle2, WREN, QBScout-S1
UniSat-6	40*40*40 cm small satellite	2014-06-19	Dnepr	Technology demonstrator, CubeSat Launch Platform	TigriSat, Lemur 1, AntelSat, AeroCube6	
UNISAT-7	Octagonal-shaped small satellite	2021-03-22	Soyuz 2.1a / Fregat-M	Research Platform, Radioamateur Activity, Technology Demonstrator, CubeSat and PocketQube Launch Platform	BCCSAT-1, FEES	DIY-1, SMOG-1, STECCO

== See also ==
- Tancredo-1
