= ICUBE-Q =

Pakistani lunar nanosatellite

ICUBE-Qamar
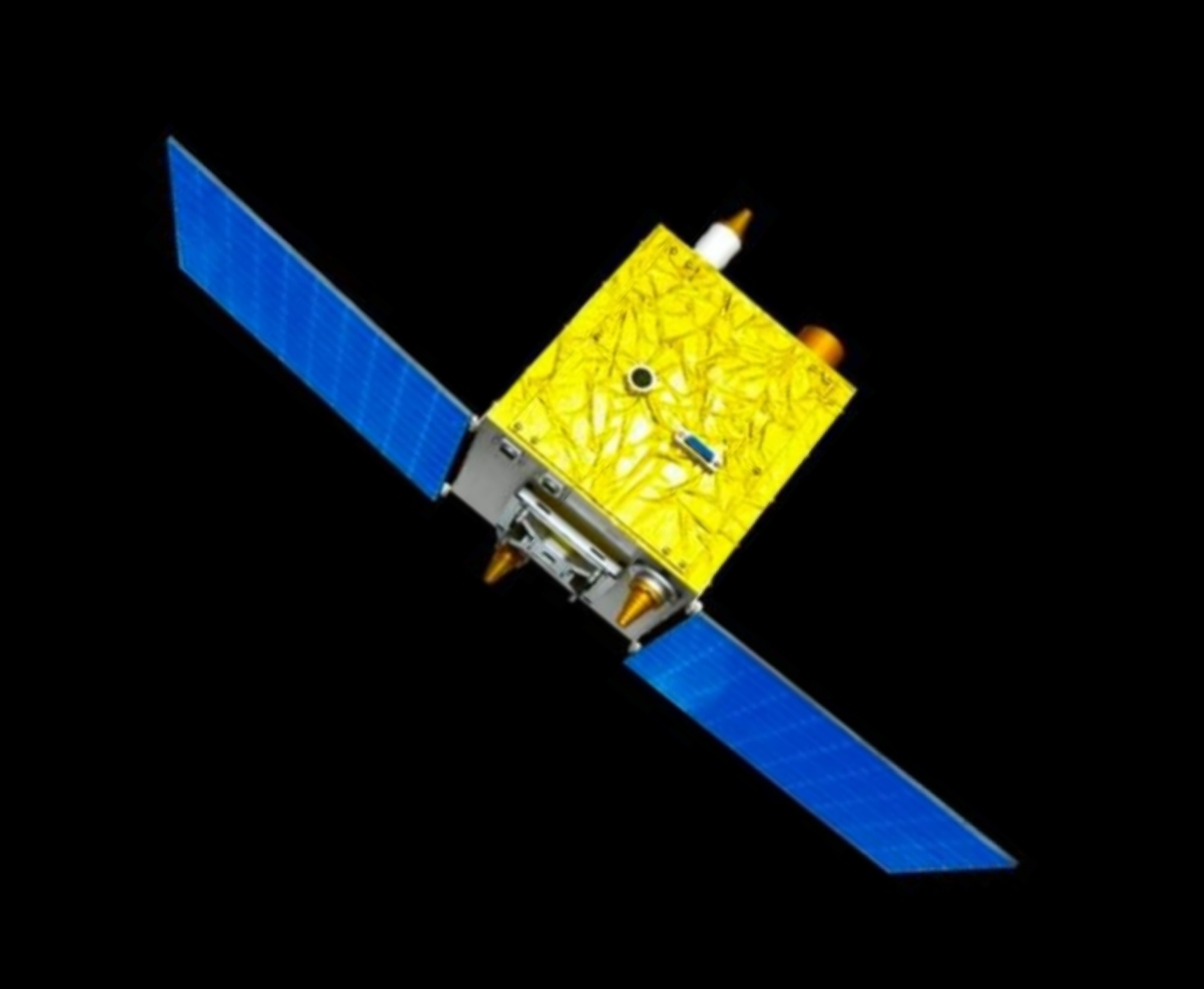
- Satellite in deployed configuration
- Mission type: Lunar Orbiter
- Operator: SUPARCO
- COSPAR ID: 2024-083C
- SATCAT no.: 59629
- Website: www.ist.edu.pk/icube-q
- Mission duration: 2-6 months

Spacecraft properties
- Spacecraft type: CubeSat (Note: Although called a "CubeSat", it does not follow the CubeSat form factor.); Nanosatellite
- Manufacturer: Institute of Space Technology; Shanghai Jiao Tong University
- Launch mass: 9.0 kg (19.8 lb)
- Dry mass: 6.5 kg (14 lb)
- Power: 139.2 watts

Start of mission
- Launch date: 3 May 2024; 09:27 UTC
- Rocket: Long March 5 Y8
- Launch site: Wenchang, China
- Deployed from: Chang'e 6 Orbiter
- Deployment date: 8 May 2024, 08:14 UTC

Orbital parameters
- Reference system: Selenocentric
- Periapsis altitude: 200 kilometres (120 mi)
- Apoapsis altitude: 8,600 kilometres (5,300 mi)
- Period: 720 minutes

Instruments
- 2 Cameras of one mega pixels (1280 × 720) mounted on opposite X panels

ICUBE-Q or ICUBE-QAMAR (Urdu: آئی کیوب-قمر) was a Pakistani lunar remote sensing nanosatellite and one of the four international payloads of the Chang'e 6 lunar sample-return mission. It was a joint venture between the Institute of Space Technology (IST), Space & Upper Atmosphere Research Commission (SUPARCO) and the Intelligent Satellite Technology Center of Shanghai Jiao Tong University (SJTU), under the framework of Asia-Pacific Space Cooperation Organization (APSCO). It was Pakistan's first deep-space mission.

== Overview ==
In 2019, the China National Space Administration (CNSA) announced opportunities for payloads in its upcoming lunar sample-return mission of Chang'e 6; the space agency had a slot for payloads weighing less than 10 kg in its orbiting spacecraft. The CNSA announced in 2022 that it will carry scientific instruments from France, Italy and Sweden on the Chang'e-6 mission's lander along with a Pakistani payload on the orbiter. Pakistan's Institute of Space Technology (IST) had answered the call with a proposal for a lunar CubeSat named "ICUBE-Qamar" (ICUBE-Q) and it was selected after a rigorous evaluation. The design and development of ICUBE-Q was a collaborative effort between Institute of Space Technology (IST), Pakistan's national space agency SUPARCO, and China's Shanghai Jiao Tong University (SJTU). IST has been developing several CubeSat in the same series of which iCube-1 was successfully launched in 2013.

The design of satellite was carried out at Space Systems Lab of Institute of Space Technology. The development was carried out jointly in the Intelligent Satellite Technology Center of School of Aeronautics and Astronautics at Shanghai Jiao Tong University. The satellite called locally as "SJTU Siyuan 2" had to integrate multiple functions within limited space and mass, including energy supply, communication systems and the scientific experiment equipment. To overcome the gravitational disturbances, strong radiation expostures, temperature fluctuations and threat of lunar dust, the spacecraft was incorporated with multi-sensor fusion technology, multi-layer shielding and advanced thermal control technology to ensure its stable operation. SJTU had previously launched its first student satellite APSCO-SSS-2A (SJTU Siyuan 1) in collaboration with Institute of Space Technology Pakistan (IST) in October 2021.

== Description ==
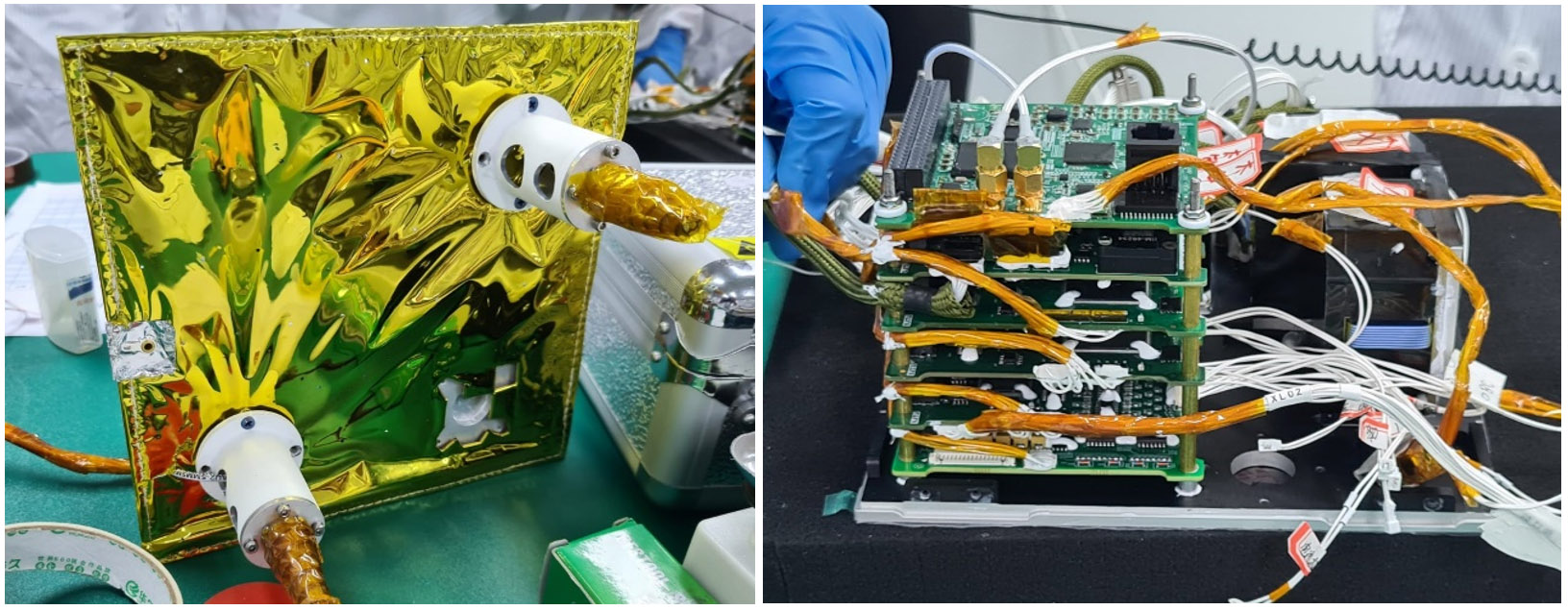
TT&C Antennas and Subsystems

The overall project consists of three main parts: the satellite itself, the separation mechanism (which includes the power control box) and the mounting bracket. The on-orbit fault diagnosis algorithm enables the satellite to automatically detect and diagnose possible system faults. The spacecraft also features intelligent task scheduling strategy.

- Design Life: 3 months (planned).
- Mass: The entire satellite weighs only 6.5 kg (14 lb) and the total carrying weight reaches 9.0 kg (19.8 lb).
- Communication: X band for TT&C and image data transfer at a data rate of 1 kbit/s.
- Power: 12 V, 11.6 Ah Battery (139.2 watts) with two deployable solar panels.
- Attitude Control: Three-axis control using reaction wheels, star sensor and Sun sensors.
- Temperature Control: Thermal management systems
- Payload: 2 Visible light cameras of one mega pixel resolution (1280 × 720) mounted on opposite (+/-) X panels.
- Built Material: Incorporates advanced materials such as special magnesium alloy and honeycomb carbon fiber.

== Mission summary ==
ICUBE-Q was integrated with Chang'e 6 orbiter after successful qualification tests at SUPARCO and SJTU. On 3 May 2024 the satellite was launched on Long March 5 Y8 rocket from Wenchang Space Launch Site.

The satellite was deployed from the Chang'e 6 lunar orbiter stack in at 08:14 UTC (13:14 PKT) on 8 May 2024 and had undergone testing for the first few days with the first images being expected around 15–16 May 2024.

The mission objectives include obtaining detailed images of the lunar surface and conducting intelligent on-orbit data processing of images, obtaining lunar magnetic field data and establish lunar magnetic field model and verifying new technologies such as nanosatellite-level deep space lunar-ground communications and low-cost deep space exploration based on micro-nano satellites.

The satellite transmitted its first images back to Earth on 11 May 2024 captured from a distance of 200 kilometres from the Moon.

It appears that Pakistan has lost contact with ICUBE-Q since July 1, 2024. Per insider information, the satellite developed multiple issues immediately after its launch.
