= Remote sensing (disambiguation) =

Remote sensing is the acquisition of information about an object or phenomenon without making physical contact with the object.

Remote sensing may also refer to:

- Remote Sensing (journal), a scientific journal
- Remote sensing (archaeology)
- Remote sensing (geology)
- Remote sensing (oceanography)
- Four-terminal sensing or remote sensing, an electrical measurement technique

== See also ==
- Remote viewing, a claimed psychic ability
