= Remote sensing (oceanography) =

Observation technique

Remote sensing in oceanography is a widely used observational technique which enables researchers to acquire data of a location without physically measuring at that location. Remote sensing in oceanography mostly refers to measuring properties of the ocean surface with sensors on satellites or planes, which compose an image of captured electromagnetic radiation. A remote sensing instrument can either receive radiation from the Earth's surface (passive), whether reflected from the Sun or emitted, or send out radiation to the surface and catch the reflection (active). All remote sensing instruments carry a sensor to capture the intensity of the radiation at specific wavelength windows, to retrieve a spectral signature for every location. The physical and chemical state of the surface determines the emissivity and reflectance for all bands in the electromagnetic spectrum, linking the measurements to physical properties of the surface. Unlike passive instruments, active remote sensing instruments also measure the two-way travel time of the signal; which is used to calculate the distance between the sensor and the imaged surface. Remote sensing satellites often carry other instruments which keep track of their location and measure atmospheric conditions.

Remote sensing observations, in comparison to (most) physical observations, are consistent in time and have good spatial coverage. Since the ocean is fluid, it is constantly changing on different spatial and temporal scales. Capturing the spatial variation of the ocean with remote sensing is considered extremely valuable and is on the frontier of oceanographic research. The high variability of the ocean surface is also the deterministic factor in the differences between land and ocean remote sensing.

== Remote sensing of the ocean ==
=== Characteristics ===
Remote sensing is actively used in various fields of natural sciences like geology, physical geography, ecology, archeology and meteorology but, remote sensing of the ocean is vastly different. Unlike most land processes the ocean, just like the atmosphere, is variable on way shorter time scales over its entire spatial scale; the ocean is always moving. The temporal variability in the object of study determines the usability of specific data and the applicable methods and is the reason why remote sensing methods differ materially between ocean and land surfaces. A single wave on the surface of the ocean can not be tracked by satellites of today. Ocean waves crash or disappear before a new observation is made, features with this time scale are rarer on land. Unlike vegetation, snow and other land covers the ocean is opaque to most electromagnetic radiation (except for visible light) therefore the ocean surface is easy to monitor but it is a challenge to retrieve information of deeper layers. Remote sensing enables temporal analysis over vast spatial scale, since satellites have a constant revisit time, provide a wide image and are often operational for multiple consecutive years. This concept of constant data in time and space was a breakthrough in oceanography, which previously relied on measurements from drifters, coastal locations like tide gauges, ships and buoys. All in-situ measurements either have a small spatial footprint or are varying in location and time, so do not deliver constant and comparable data.

=== History ===
Remote sensing as we know it today started with the first earth orbiting satellite Landsat 1 in 1973. Landsat 1 delivered the first multi-spectral images of features on land and coastal zones all over the world and already showed effectiveness in oceanography, although not specifically designed for it. In 1978 NASA made the next step in remote sensing for oceanography with the launch of the first orbiting satellite dedicated to ocean research, Seasat. The satellite carried 5 different instruments: a Radar altimeter for retrieving sea surface height, a microwave scatterometer to retrieve wind speeds and direction, a microwave radiometer to retrieve sea surface temperature (SST), an optical and infrared radiometer to check for clouds and surface characteristics and lastly the first Synthetic Aperture Radar (SAR) instrument. Seasat was only operational for a few months but, together with the Coastal Zone Color Scanner (CZCS) on Nimbus-7, proved the feasibility of many techniques and instruments in ocean remote sensing. TOPEX/POSEIDON, an altimeter launched in 1992, provided the first continuous global map of sea surface topography and continued on the possibilities explored by Seasat. The Jason-1, Jason-2 and Jason-3 missions continue the measurements from 1992 to today to form a complete time-series of the global sea surface height. Also other techniques hosted on Seasat found continuation. The Advanced Very-High-Resolution Radiometer (AVHRR) is the sensor carried on all NOAA missions and made SST retrieval accessible with a continuous time-series since 1979. The European Space Agency (ESA) further developed SAR with the ERS-2, ENVISAT and now Sentinel-1 missions by providing larger spatial footprints, lowering the resolution and flying twin missions to reduce the effective revisit time. Optical remote sensing of the ocean found continuation after the CZCS with polar orbiting missions ENVISAT, OrbView-2, MODIS and very recently with Sentinel-3, to form a continuous record since 1997. Sentinel-3 is now one of the best equipped missions to map the ocean hosting a SAR altimiter, multispectral spectrometer a radiometer and several other instruments on multiple satellites with alternating orbits providing exceptional temporal and spatial resolution.

=== Methods ===
The physical and chemical state of a surface or object have direct impact on the emissivity, reflectance and refractance of electromagnetic radiation. Sensors on remote sensing instruments capture radiation, which can be translated back to deduce the physio-chemical properties of the surface. Water content, temperature, roughness and colour are characteristics often deduced from the spectral characteristics of the surface. A sensor on a satellite returns the composite signal for a certain area inside the footprint called a cell, the size of the unique cells is referred to as the spatial resolution. The spatial resolution of a sensor is determined by the distance from earth and the available bandwidth for data transfer. A satellite passes over the same location consistently through time with the same interval called the revisit-time or temporal resolution. Sensors can not have both a very high temporal and spatial resolution so a tradeoff has to be made specific for the goal of the mission. Sensors on satellites have measuring errors, caused by for example atmospheric interference, geolocation imprecision and topographic distortion. Complete derived products from remote sensing often use simple calculations or algorithms to transform the spectral signature from a cell to a physical value. All methods of transferring spectral data has certain biases which can contribute to the measurement errors of the final result. Often surface characteristics can be deduced with very low error margins due to data corrections, using onboard data or models, and a physically correct translation of spectral characteristics to physio-chemical characteristics.

Although it is interesting to know the surface characteristics at a certain moment, often research is more interested in documenting the change of a surface over time or the transport of characteristics through space. Change detection leverages the consistent temporal component of remote sensing data to analyze the change of surface properties in time. Change detection relies on having at least two observations taken at different times to analyze the difference between the two images visually or analytically. In land remote sensing change detection is used for example: to assess the impact of a volcano eruption, check the growth of plants through time, map deforestation, and measure ice sheet melt. In oceanography the surface changes more quickly than the revisit time of a satellite making it difficult to monitor certain processes. Change detection in oceanography requires the characteristic to change continuously like sea level rise or change spatial scale slower than the revisit time of the satellite like algal blooms. Another way to infer change from only 1 acquisition is by computing the dynamical component and direction from a static image which is leveraged in RADAR altimetry to deduce surface current velocity.

== Remote sensing use cases ==
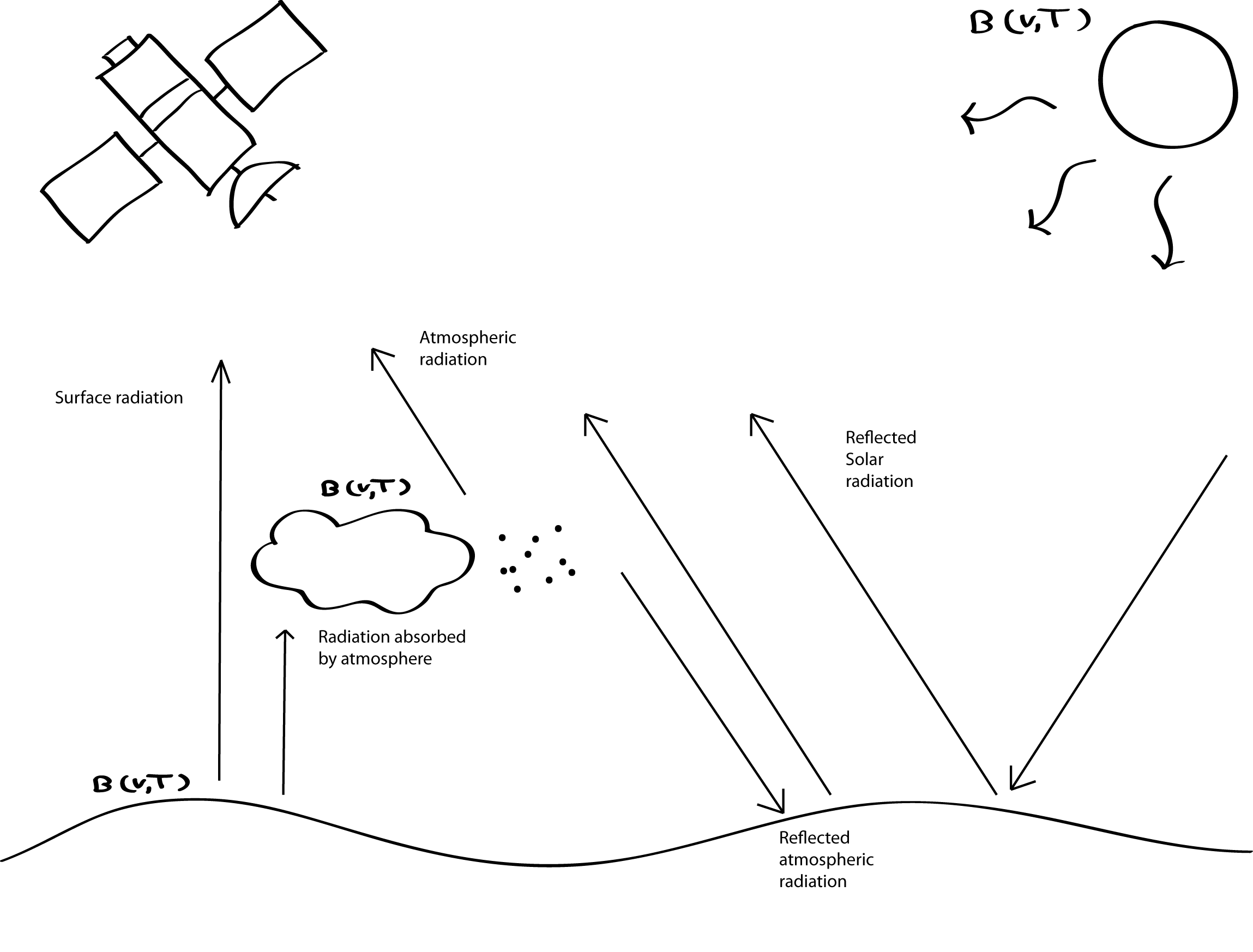
Radiation scheme showing the main components of incoming radiation for a thermal infrared radiometer. Incoming radiation is either directly emitted by the surface, re-emitted by the atmosphere after absorption, emitted in the atmosphere and reflected at the surface or is reflected sunlight. Only the directly emitted surface radiation gives information so the other noise has to be filtered out using atmospheric correction and cloud detection. reflected sunlight has almost no impact on thermal infrared radiometry.

=== Sea surface temperature (thermal infrared radiometry) ===
The ocean surface emits electromagnetic radiation $B$ dependent on the temperature $T$ at a certain frequency $\nu$ following Planck's law for black body radiation, scaled by the emissivity $\epsilon$ of the surface since the ocean is not a perfect black body.

- $B(\nu, T) = \frac{ 2 h \nu^3}{c^2} \frac{1}{e^\frac{h\nu}{k_\mathrm B T} - 1} \cdot \epsilon$

With $B(\nu, T)$ the spectral radiance, $h$ the Planck constant; $c$ the speed of light and $k$ the Boltzmann constant. Most radiation emitted by earth is in the thermal-infrared spectrum which is part of the atmospheric window, the spectral region for which the atmosphere does not significantly absorb radiation. The radiation coming from the earth's surface with a wavelength within the atmospheric window can be captured by a passive radiometry sensor at satellite height. The radiation captured by the sensor is corrected for atmospheric disturbance and radiation noise to compute the brightness temperature of the ocean surface. With a correct estimation of the emissivity of sea water (~0.99) the grey body temperature of the ocean surface can be deduced, also referred to as the Sea Surface Temperature (SST).

To correctly remove atmospheric disturbance, both emission and absorption, the airborne radiometers are calibrated for every measurement by SST measurements in multiple bands and/or under different angles. Atmospheric correction is only viable if the measured surface is not covered in clouds as they significantly disturb the emitted radiation. Clouds are either removed as viable pixels in the image using cloud busting algorithms or clouds are handled using histogram and spatial coherency techniques (up to 80% cloud cover). Radiometry captures the surface skin temperature (~10 micron depth) of the ocean, which significantly differs from bulk SST in-situ measurements. Phenomena close but not at the surface like diurnal thermocline formation are not well captured with satellites but SST can still be of tremendous value in oceanography. Overall satellites measure the SST with a ~0.1-0.6 K accuracy dependent on the sensor and only experience limited issues like surface slicks.

Retrieved SST datasets really transformed oceanographic research during the 1980's and has multiple different uses. The SST is a clear climatological indicator linking to the ENSO cycles, weather and climate change but can also highlight movement of ocean water. SST anomalies can highlight mesoscale eddies, ocean fronts and regions of upwelling, vertical mixing or river outflow as the water is locally more cold or warm due to transport. The SST is directly linked to the horizontal density gradient which is really strong at fronts and is induced by ocean currents and eddies. The currents and fronts are visible in SST images and can be detected using edge detection via high pass filters or kernel transformations to study the dynamics and origin. SST is widely used to track upwelling and river outflow strength as these processes are clearly visible as negative SST anomalies.

=== Mapping of algal blooms (Optical) ===
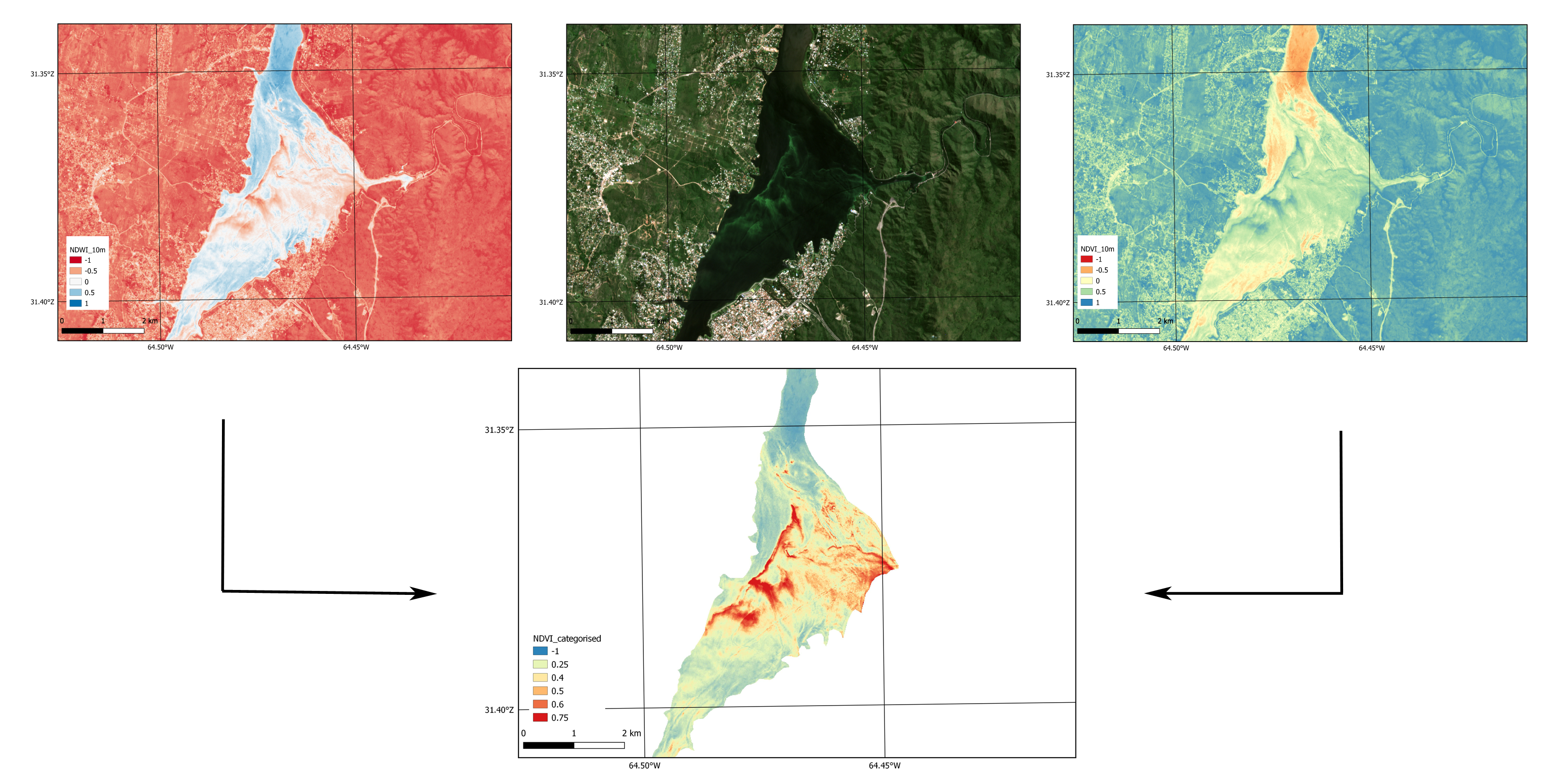
Panel containing a NDWI, RGB and NDVI remote sensing image of an algal bloom in the San Roque lake in Córdoba Argentina derived from Sentinel-2 level 2a optical data of 2017-02-22. Combining the NDWI and NDVI using thresholding and edge detection an image is derived showing a categorized intensity of the algal bloom in the lake. The NDVI image can be combined with in situ measurements or the spectral signature of chlorophyll-a to make an estimation of the total concentration of phytoplankton/chlorophyll, which is an indication for the pollution of the water.

An algae bloom is the enhanced growth of photosynthetic organisms in a water system, which manifests itself as a clear change of water color. Algal blooms are often caused by a local enrichment of the water system with nutrients, which temporarily remove the limiting growth factor of photosynthetic organisms like cyanobacteria. Due to oxygen depletion, blocking sunlight and the release of possible toxins algal blooms can be harmful to their environment. Algae are characterized by their green color, caused by the absorption spectra of the chlorophyll-a in these organisms. Optical satellites like Sentinel-2 or active radiometers like Sentinel-3 and MODIS can capture the reflectance of the ocean surface in the visible and near-infrared spectrum. Areas with a higher concentration of algae near the surface have a distinct different color. The spectral signature of an algal bloom in water is captured by the sensor as a high green and near-infrared radiation reflectance and low red light reflectance.

To map algal blooms thresholding is used in combination with a spectral index like the Normalized Difference Vegetation Index (NDVI). In one observation the intensity and location of the algal bloom can be recorded, and with a second observation at a different time the displacement and intensity change of the algal bloom can be tracked. Algal blooms are used to study internal wave structures, up-welling and river outflows, which all bring nutrients to surface waters, since they are correlated with algae concentration . Pollution often coincides with high nutrient waters, making algal blooms good indicators for the severity and impact of water pollution

=== Sea surface height (RADAR altimetry) ===
RADAR altimeters send microwave pulses to the surface and catch the reflection intensity over a short time period measuring the two-way travel time of the signal. Electromagnetic radiation travels with the speed of light $c$ thus the two way travel time $t$ gives information on the height of the satellite above the surface $R_{sat}$ following the formula $R_{sat} = \frac{c \cdot t}{2}$ . To deduce the sea surface height from the satellite height the two-way travel time has to be corrected for dynamical errors, the atmospheric conditions and the local geoid height $h_{geoid}$. The local change of the sea surface height due to dynamical effects like wind and currents can be expressed using the following formula.

$h_{dyn} = H_{sat} - RH_{sat} - h_{geoid} - h_{tide} - h_{atm}$

- $h_{dyn}$ is the dynamic Sea Surface Height (SSH) which changes dependent on wind and current conditions.
- $H_{sat}$ is the height of the satellite above the reference ellipsoid which is in the order of a 100 km and is known with a cm precision.
- $R_{sat}$ is the height of the satellite above the ocean surface and is the quantity measured by the satellite with cm precision.
- $h_{geoid}$ is the local height difference between the geoid and the reference ellipsoid which is in the order of ±100 cm and can be estimated using a time series of ocean altimetry data.
- $h_{tide}$ is the local height difference due to tidal movements of which the magnitude scales dependent of the time of day.
- $h_{atm}$ is the local height difference due to atmospheric pressure difference above the surface.

It is hard to correctly estimate $h_{geoid}$ , $h_{tide}$ and $h_{atm}$ for a certain moment and location. As a solution remote sensing analysts use the Sea Surface Height Anomaly (SSHA) which only requires information on the tidal height and atmospheric pressure, which can be deduced from drifters, weather programs and tidal models. The geoid height for SSHA retrieval is deduced from a long time-series of the same RADAR altimetry data. The SSHA is computed by subtracting the temporal mean of the SSH or Mean Sea Surface (MSS) from the current SSH with $h_{MSS} = [(h_{dyn} + h_{geoid})]$ so that: $h_{SSHA} = h_{dyn} + h_{geoid} - MSS$

Although the SSHA can show anomalies in surface currents of the ocean, often a measure called the Absolute Dynamic Topography (ADT) is computed using an independent measurement of the geoid height to display the total ocean currents.

$h_{ADT} = h_{SSHA} + h_{MSS} - h_{geoid}$ with the geoid height as a measurement from instruments like the Gravity and Ocean Circulations Explorer (GOCE) or Gravity Recovery and Climate Experiment (GRACE).

With the launch of TOPEX/POSEIDON in 1992 started a continuous time series of global SSH data which, has been extremely valuable in assessing sea level rise in the past decades by combining data with local tide gauges. The dynamical sea surface height from radar altimetry provides useful insight into ocean currents. If assuming geostrophic balance, the velocity anomaly and direction of surface currents perpendicular to the satellite overpass can be computed using the formula:

$fv_{a} = g \frac{\partial h_{ssha}}{\partial x}$ and $fu_{a} = g \frac{\partial h_{ssha}}{\partial y}$ for $u = [u] + u_a$ and $v = [v] + v_a$

With $f$ the Coriolis force, $g$ the gravity constant, $u, v$ the zonal and meridional velocity and $h_{SSHA}$ the derived sea surface height anomaly. RADAR altimeters are able to collect data even in cloudy circumstances but only cover the globe up to latitudes ~60 - 65°. Often the spatial resolution of RADAR altimeters is not too high but their temporal coverage is tremendous, allowing constant monitoring of the ocean surface. RADAR altimeters can also be used to determine the specific wave height and estimate wind velocities using the wave form and backscatter coefficient of the pulse limited return signal.

=== Challenges of Remote Sensing in Coastal Zones ===
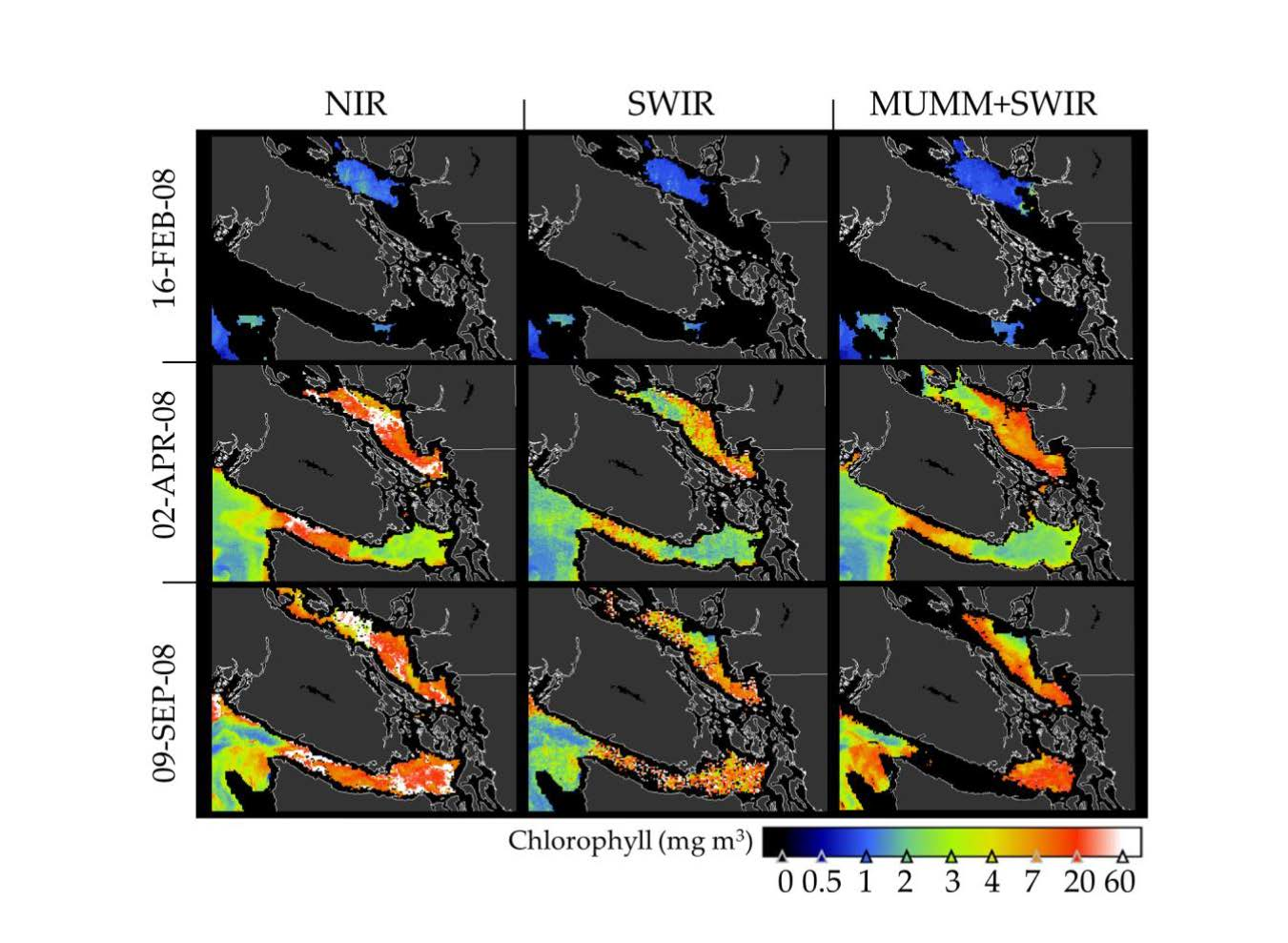
Example of MODIS-derived chlorophyll distribution with missing pixels along the coastlines

There can be numerous limitations with the sensors and techniques used by remote sensing tools when it comes to mapping coastal regions. Some challenges stem from issues with resolution and pixel size, as most remote imaging satellites have a pixel size of approximately 1 square kilometer. This presents issues with analyzing coastal regions in the desired level of detail as most coastal processes occur on a spatial scale that is approximately the same (or smaller) than the pixel size provided by remote imaging satellites. Additionally, most ocean sensors have a global coverage frequency of 1–2 days, which may be too long to observe the temporal scale of coastal ocean processes.

Furthermore, remote sensing of coastal areas has faced challenges in accurately interpreting the color of the ocean. The color of open ocean basins is mostly controlled by phytoplankton and travel predictably or covary with other constituents in the water column like chlorophyll a. However, as we get closer to the coastlines and move from the open ocean, to shelf seas, to coastal waters, the particles in the water do not covary with chlorophyll. The apparent color may be influenced by optically active constituents in the water column, such as sediments from runoff or pollution. The satellites can also be influenced by "adjacency effects", where the color of the land can bleed into coastal ocean pixels. Finally, removing the effects of the atmosphere is difficult to achieve because of the complex and dynamic mix of coastal aerosols and sea spray. All of these factors can make it increasingly challenging to accurately analyze coastal regions from remote sensing satellites.

=== Use of UAVs in Remote Sensing ===
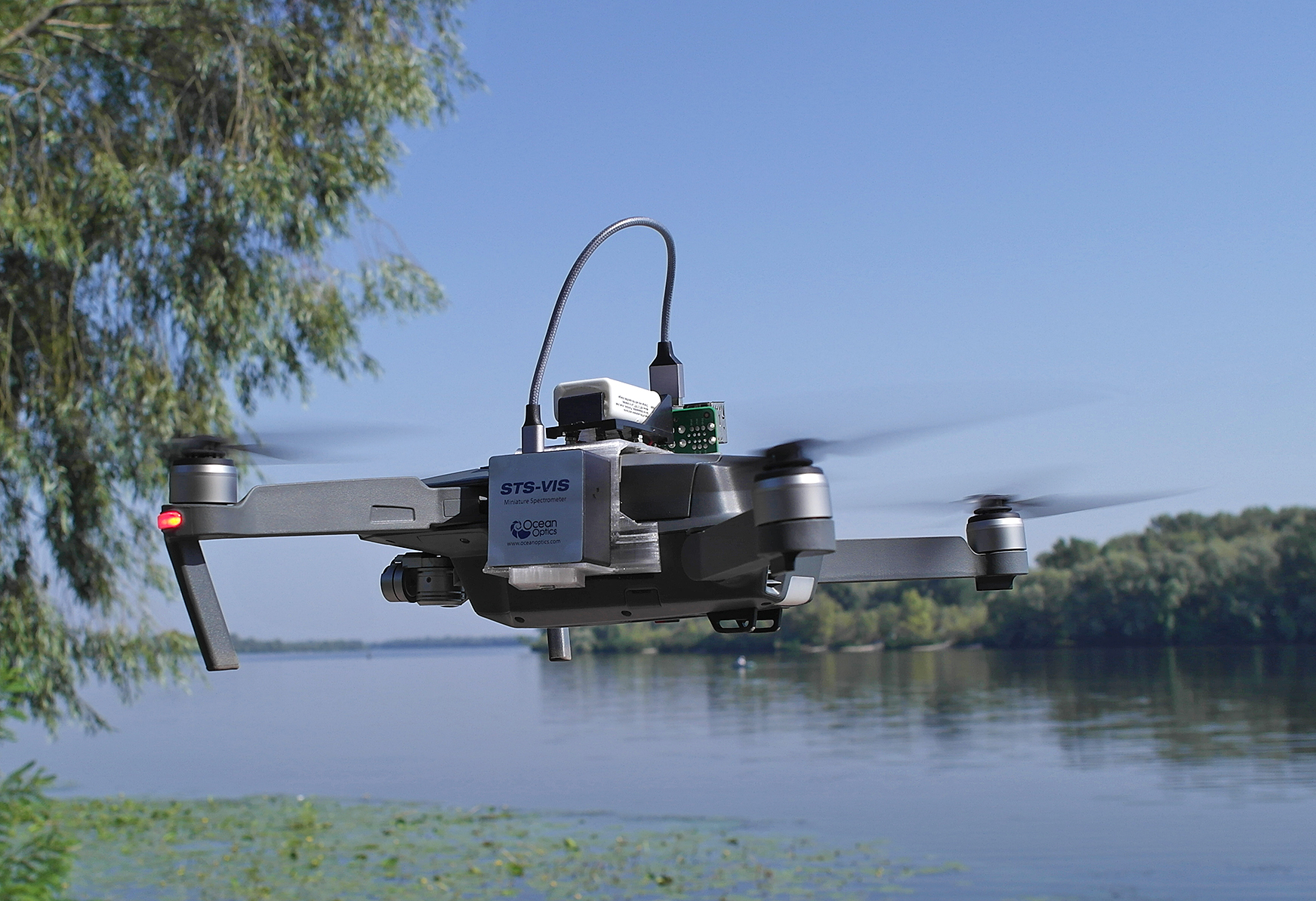
Drone equipped with spectrophotometer.

Satellites, while the core of remote sensing, have limitations in their spatial, spectral, and temporal resolution. In an effort to combat these limitations, satellite remote sensing utilizes interpolation and modelling to fill in the gaps. While methods of interpolation and modelling can be developed to a high degree of statistical accuracy, they are in their essence an educated guess based on surrounding conditions. The use of UAVs, or drones, as a remote sensing tool can provide data at higher resolutions that can then be used to fill in the gaps in satellite data, often at a lower price than satellites or crewed aircraft. Notable benefits can be found in the pixel gaps found along coastal areas in satellite data as well as the ability to conduct observations of a given area between satellite passes.

Modern technology has provided UAV users with numerous platforms able to be outfitted with commercial or custom made sensor packages. These sensors consist of multispectral, hyperspectral sensors as well as standard visual spectrum, high definition cameras. The size of modern UAVs is also a factor contributing to their applicability. Satellites and crewed aircraft require shore-based facilities or ships capable of supporting take-off and landing operations. Small-UAVs, those defined as under 55 pounds, have the ability to be launched from nearly every location on shore as well as any size vessel at sea. They require very few crew to operate and flight training requirements are affordable and relatively easy to obtain.

There are some limiting factors to UAV use for oceanic remote sensing. Firstly, the range is limited to the on board fuel or battery capacity as well as distance from the controller. Many governments also impose restrictions on range, stating that UAVs must be flown within unaided visual line of sight. UAV use offshore must be accompanied by a vessel due to these range constraints. Furthermore, the sensors themselves encounter similar challenges to the sensors mounted on satellites, namely in alterations to oceanic reflectance in coastal zones; however, the higher resolution provided by UAV mounted sensors allows for a more diverse assignment of pixels, reducing the blending effect of terrestrial and aquatic environments and reducing the amount of calculations needed to account for reflectance shifts.
