= Tancredo-1 =

Brazilian satellite

- Mission type: Geoscience; Technology
- Operator: INPE; EMTAN
- COSPAR ID: 1998-067KT
- SATCAT no.: 41931
- Mission duration: 4 months

Start of mission
- Launch date: December 9, 2016. Orbit since January 16, 2017
- Rocket: H-IIB/Kounotori 6
- Launch site: Japan Yoshinobu Launch Complex, Tanegashima Space Center

End of mission
- Decay date: October 18, 2017

Orbital parameters
- Reference system: Geocentric
- Regime: Low Earth
- Eccentricity: 0,0008418
- Periaag altitude: 383 km
- Apoaag altitude: 394 km
- Inclination: 51,64°
- Period: 92,32 min

Tancredo-1 was a Brazilian picosatellite. It was a TubeSat which was developed by the students from the school Tancredo Almeida Neves, in Ubatuba (state of São Paulo), with support for the picosat platform made by Instituto Nacional de Pesquisas Espaciais (INPE), adapting and integration to launch provided by TuPOD from Italian company GAUSS Srl and by Agência Espacial Brasileira (AEB).

== Project ==
The idea was proposed by math teacher Cândido Oswaldo de Moura and initially developed by Emerson Issao Yaegashi, it was inspired by Super Interessante Magazine in Brazil and in a video called "TubeSats" and kits to build personal satellites developed by the company Interorbital Systems, in the United States. To start the project, the teacher contacted the Instituto Nacional de Pesquisas Espaciais (INPE), where, later, he was followed by another teacher to receive training and be able to help the students. The material to construct the satellite sponsored by a salesclerk of Ubatuba and the launch was possible with help of AEB. The satellite was named “Tancredo-1” after the school.

== Characteristics ==
The picosatellite was 13 cm long and has a mass of 570 grams. It had five plaques in its structure. Solar arrays in the cylinder were responsible for powering the components of Tancredo-1. Some space existed inside the satellite that could be used for small scientific experiments in space, in the case of Tancredo-1, two payloads were used: one voice recorder for radio-amateurs, educational payload and one simplified Langmuir probe to study the formation of plasma bubbles in the ionosphere. The Langmuir probe was made by National Institute for Space Research. The platform tubesat passed by a total re-engineering from the work to Mestrado em Engenharia de Sistemas Espaciais Eng. Auro Tikami from INPE with orientation of Walter Abrahão dos Santos – INPE.

Almost 100 students took part in the project with the job of welding pieces and building electric circuits. It orbited the Earth from 310 km. The satellite suffered orbital decay and burnt up in the atmosphere.

The TubeSat started transmitting on January 19, 2017 on the frequency of 437.200 MHz in the 70 cm amateur band.

== Article ==
- Auro Tikami; Candido O. de Moura; Walter A. dos Santos (2017). First On-Orbit Results from the Tancredo-1 Picosat Mission (PDF). Archived (PDF) from the original on 2021-03-06.

== See also ==
- Interorbital Systems
