= Al-Ta'ir (satellite) =

Iraqi satellite project

Al-Ta'ir-1
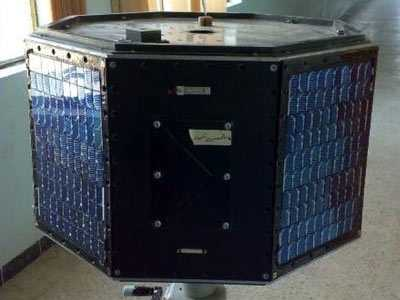
- Image of Al-Ta'ir-1
- Mission type: Communications and navigation
- Operator: Space Research Centre of Iraq

Spacecraft properties
- Manufacturer: Ministry of Industry and Military Industrialisation (Iraq)
- Launch mass: 75 kg
- Dry mass: 300 kg
- Power: 0.2 kilowatts

Orbital parameters
- Altitude: 350-400 km

Transponders
- Band: VHF/UHF

The Al-Ta'ir (Arabic: الطائر) satellite was an Iraqi small experimental satellite program designed for conducting communication and rangefinding. It started in the 1980s under the leadership of Saddam Hussein and was to be put in LEO with the help of an Ariane 4 or al-Abid vehicle; however, after the Gulf War, Iraq could not obtain such vehicles and could only develop the satellite.

== History ==
It was in the 1980s that Iraq under Saddam Hussein sought to produce its own satellite, however foreign political opposition made this difficult, thus research could only formally begin in 1988 with the start of the Iraqi space program in which the development of a launch vehicle was also sought. According to the Space Applications Center of the Space Technology Directorate within Iraq's Ministry of Science & Technology Sarmad D.S. Dawood Iraq's scientific research council established a space research center, Iraqi scientists of the research center managed to produce two identical flight-ready satellites, they also had a plan of building a tracking, control and communications station. Some sources put the names of the two identical satellites as Al-Ta'ir 1 and Al-Ta'ir 2. The Iraqis planned to put the satellite aboard an Ariane 4 rocket using the Ariane 44L vehicle as a baseline to get the satellite into a 350–400 km LEO, presumably having a low inclination in order to maximize the time they spent above the country. The only problem was that the Ariane 4 only flew to polar low Earth orbit and geostationary transfer orbit. According to Dawood the program came to a halt after the invasion of Kuwait and subsequent Gulf War. According to Dawood Iraq continued designing subsystems like digital imaging cameras for more advanced satellite system such as remote sensing spacecraft from 1991 to 2003.

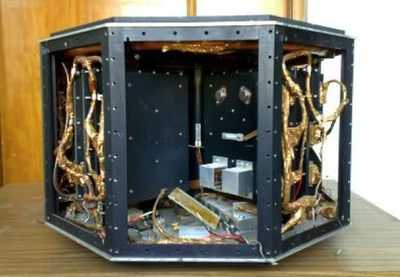
Cross section displaying the internal components of the Al-Ta'ir-1

== Characteristics ==
The satellite was octagonal having a height of 47 cm and a diameter of 74 cm, it had an overall weight of 75 kg, sources describe its appearance as that of a "1970's disco-themed coffee table". When it comes to the interior of the satellite, it was divided into four bays for protecting the internal electronics from the vibration of launch. The satellite was spin-stabilized and only had passive thermal protection, by black and white paint. The satellite was solar powered, having seven solar batteries and an additional back-up battery. When it comes to electronics then the satellite had an onboard data management system, a radio frequency communication system that operated UHF and VHF bands which communicated voice, telemetry and telecommand data and an attitude control system.

== See also ==
- Badr
- Omid
- Tigrisat
