= Institute of Space Technology =

Public university in Pakistan

- Motto: Exploring the Final Frontier
- Type: Public
- Established: September 2002
- Affiliations: Higher Education Commission (Pakistan), Pakistan Engineering Council, Washington Accord
- Chancellor: President of Pakistan
- Vice-Chancellor: Maj Gen (R) Syed Najeeb Ahmad, HI(M), PhD.
- Dean: Dr. Mohammad Abdur Rahman Khan
- Students: 3900
- Undergraduates: 2600
- Postgraduates: 800
- Doctoral students: 500
- Location: Islamabad, Pakistan
- Campus: 231 ha, Urban
- Nickname: IST
- Website: ist.edu.pk

The Institute of Space Technology (also known as IST) (Urdu: مؤسسه فناوری خلائی) is a public university located in Islamabad, Pakistan. It is focused on the study of astronomy, aerospace engineering, avionics engineering, computer science, artificial intelligence, data science and astronautics.

Established in September 2002 under the auspices of the Pakistan's national space agency, SUPARCO, the IST offers a wide array of undergraduate and graduate degrees in partnership with Beihang University and University of Surrey. Since 2008, the IST has an ISO-certified management standard. The IST is based on a 231 hectare campus on the outskirts of Islamabad. In October 2005, the federal government granted IST autonomous degree-awarding status through a presidential ordinance. The institute's governance structure was updated on 5 June 2007 through a revised presidential charter, which served as the basis for the Institute of Space Technology Act, 2010, enacted by the Parliament of Pakistan to grant the university federal statutory recognition. It is one of the top institutions in the country as per the Higher Education Commission ranking.

== Academics ==
=== Degree programs ===
The disciplines and the degree programs offered by IST have been given below. The regular duration of BS and MS / M Phil degree programs is 4 and 2 years, respectively.

| Discipline | Degree Program | | |
| Discipline | BS / BE | MS / M Phil, | Ph.D. |
|---|---|---|---|
| Aerospace Engineering | ✓ | ✓ | ✓ |
| Avionics Engineering | ✓ | | |
| Electrical Engineering | ✓ | ✓ | ✓ |
| Materials Science & Engineering | ✓ | ✓ | ✓ |
| Biotechnology | ✓ | | |
| Mechanical Engineering | ✓ | ✓ | ✓ |
| Computer Science | ✓ | ✓ | |
| Artificial intelligence | ✓ | | |
| Data Science | ✓ | | |
| Space Science | ✓ | ✓ | ✓ |
| Astronomy & Astrophysics | | ✓ | ✓ |
| Global Navigation Satellite Systems | | ✓ | |
| Remote Sensing & GIS | | ✓ | |
| Environmental & Climate Sciences | | ✓ | |
| Mathematics | ✓ | ✓ | ✓ |
| Physics | ✓ | ✓ | |
| Computer engineering | ✓ | | |

=== Departments ===
At present, the institute holds the following Departments:

- Aeronautics & Astronautics
- Electrical Engineering
- Computer Science
- Applied Mathematics & Statistics
- Materials Science & Engineering
- Mechanical Engineering
- Space Science
- National Centre for Remote-Sensing & Geo-Informatics
- Humanities & Sciences
- Avionics Engineering

== Campuses ==
=== Kahuta ===
Dr. A. Q. Khan Institute of Computer Science and Information Technology (KICSIT) is a research institute dedicated and focused towards the learning of computer science, management science, and computer engineering, located in Kahuta, Punjab, Pakistan. Established in November 2000, the school is named after its founder, dr. A. Q. Khan, and its academic programs and research is supported by the Khan Research Laboratories (KRL).

During in its formative years, the campus received its faculty support, curriculum development and degree accreditation from the University of Engineering and Technology in Taxila, before becoming research campus of Institute of Space Technology in Islamabad.

== Annual events ==
- IST Youth Carnival (IYC)

It was called as "All-Pakistan Inter University Challenge". IST has organized the Challenge every year for four years. The event attracts participation from the universities/degree awarding institutes/post-graduate colleges in the Rawalpindi/Islamabad area as well as from the cities of Taxila and Peshawar. The event includes over a dozen extracurricular competitions such as dramatics, short film, all-rounder, Mushaira and Battle of the Bands. Recently, the name of this event has now been replaced by IST Youth Carnival, or IYC.

- World Space Week.

In 1999, the United Nations General Assembly declared 4–10 October as World Space Week. Pakistan is endeavoring to enter into the realm of Space Science & Technology and related applications. In past couple of decades IST has seen considerable advances in this field. The success of any space program relies greatly on public understanding and support. The IST in collaboration with the Space & Upper Atmosphere Research Commission National Space Agency (SUPARCO) is communicating the benefits of Space Technology to the public on a regular basis. The institute has pioneered the observation of the International World Space Week in Pakistan. Walks, lectures and seminars are arranged in schools and colleges of the Twin-City area by students of IST. The week culminates with a full day variety show at the Institute that includes space quiz, poster competitions, space cinema and a musical concert.

- IST Culture Fest

IST Culture fest is one of its kind two days event held at IST in June 2022. The event consisted of series of fun-filled and interesting events including Concert, Mushaira, Dramy-Bazian and Voice Alpha.

== ICUBE - IST CubeSat Program ==
=== ICube-1 ===
Institute of Space Technology on 21 November 2013, launched Pakistan's first Cubesat satellite, ICUBE-1, onboard Dnepr launch vehicle from Yasny launch base, Russia. Its transmitted signal can be heard on VHF band. It has a mass of 1.1 kg & has a volume of 10 cm cube, it houses several sensors to collect data for scientific purposes. ICUBE-1 is a fully autonomous satellite and is capable of maintaining its health via its on-board computer. ICUBE-1 will open up a wide range of future experiments that can be carried on Cubesat in the domain of imaging, microgravity, biology, nanotechnology, space dynamics, chemistry, space physics and various other fields.

=== ICube-Q ===
IST in coordination with SUPARCO developed a cube satellite for the observation of the Moon, which was launched on 3 May 2024 on China's Long March 5 Y8 rocket from Wenchang Space Launch Site. The mission objectives included obtaining detailed images of the lunar surface and conducting intelligent on-orbit data processing of images, obtaining lunar magnetic field data and establish lunar magnetic field model and verifying new technologies such as nanosatellite-level deep space lunar-ground communications and low-cost deep space exploration based on micro-nano satellites.

== See also ==
- Pakistan Remote Sensing Satellite
- Space and Upper Atmosphere Research Commission (SUPARCO)
