= UniSat-6 =

Italian micro-satellite

UNISAT-6
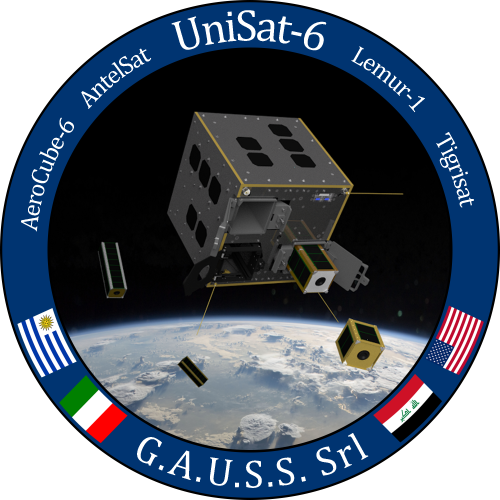
- UNISAT-6 Mission Patch
- Mission type: Technology demonstration
- Operator: GAUSS Srl
- COSPAR ID: 2014-033C
- SATCAT no.: 40012
- Website: GAUSS Srl page on UniSat-6 mission

Spacecraft properties
- Launch mass: 26 kg (57 lb)

Start of mission
- Launch date: 19 June 2014; 11 years ago
- Rocket: Dnepr
- Launch site: Dombarovsky site 13

Orbital parameters
- Reference system: Geocentric
- Regime: Sun Synchronous
- Eccentricity: 0.005957
- Perigee altitude: 610 km
- Apogee altitude: 694 km
- Inclination: 97.93 °

UniSat-6 is an Italian micro-satellite developed by GAUSS Srl and launched in 2014. The satellite is built in a 0.4x0.4x0.4m box-shaped bus, optimized for piggy-back launch. All instruments are powered by solar cells mounted on the spacecraft body, with maximal electrical power of 11W. The satellite has no on-orbit propulsion; it makes use of an attitude stabilization system based on permanent magnets.

== Launch ==
UniSat-6 was launched from Dombarovsky (air base) site 13, Russia, on 19 June 2014 by a Dnepr rocket.

== Mission ==
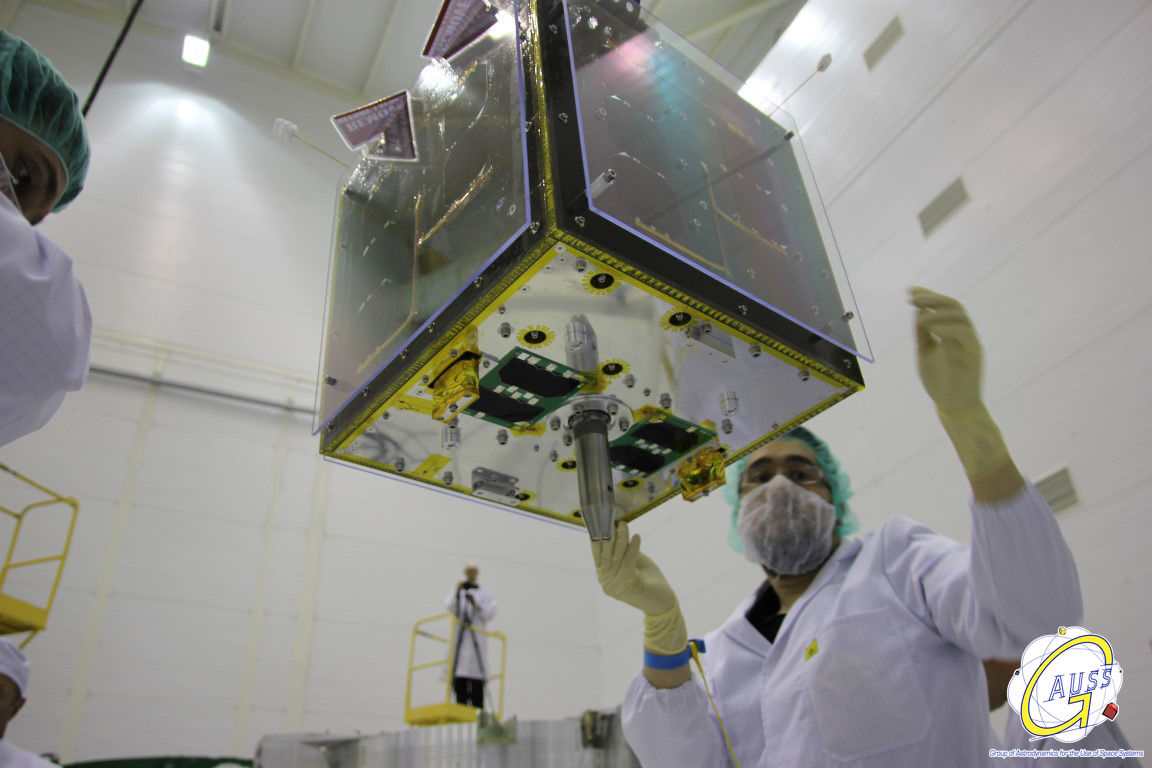
UniSat-6 during satellite integration with the Dnepr launcher.

The satellite is intended primarily for technology verification in space, the main test piece being 3 deployment systems loaded with 4 CubeSat satellites, namely AeroCube 6, Lemur 1, ANTELSAT and TigriSat, with a total volume 9U. All sub-satellites were deployed 25 hours after achieving orbit, without incidents.

The satellite is also equipped with an on-board camera to take pictures of the release of the cubesats and for Earth Observation.

== See also ==
- 2014 in spaceflight
