= Al-Abid =

Iraqi civilian rocket project

- Function: Launch vehicle
- Manufacturer: MIMI (Ministry of Industry and Military Industrialization); SRC (Space research Centre)
- Country of origin: Iraq

Size
- Height: 25 m
- Diameter: 0.88 m(First stage); 1.25 m(Second stage)
- Mass: 48,000 kg
- Stages: 3 stages

Capacity

Payload to LEO
- Mass: 100-300 kg into 200-500 km orbit(Planned)

Launch history
- Status: Abandoned
- Launch sites: 230 km south of Baghdad in al Anbar
- Total launches: 1
- First flight: 5 December 1989 (First stage only)

First stage
- Diameter: 0.88 m
- Gross mass: 48,000 kg
- Propellant mass: 26,020 kg
- Powered by: Isayev S5.2 (9D21)
- Maximum thrust: sea-level:660.7 kN vacuum:731.6 kN; 70,000 kgf (690 kN)
- Specific impulse: sea-level:2,285 metres per second (233.0 s) vacuum:2,530 metres per second (258 s)
- Burn time: 90 s
- Propellant: IRFNA/UDMH

Second stage
- Diameter: 1.25 m
- Propellant mass: 3,760 kg
- Powered by: Isayev S5.2 (9D21)
- Maximum thrust: vacuum:146.3 kN
- Specific impulse: vacuum:2,530 metres per second (258 s)
- Burn time: 65 s
- Propellant: DETA/UDMH

Third stage
- Diameter: 1.25 m
- Powered by: SA-2 motor

The Al-Abid (Arabic: العابد) LV was an Iraqi three-stage "Satellite launch system", a civilian project that was commenced in 1988. The Iraqis intended to launch an Al-Ta'ir satellite with the help of such a launch vehicle. The Iraqis therefore pursued a LV with stages based on Scud missiles and the S-75 Dvina. However, only the first stage could be tested in December 1989 and according to General Ra'ad the next stages could not be developed. General Ra'ad says that not even the drawings of the second and third stage vehicles are available and that no final report could be produced. UN inspectors and U.S intelligence did not offer many details regarding the Al-Abid launch vehicle as they were not interested in it.

== Planning ==
In 1988 Iraq declared a program to design as well as manufacture a LV capable of putting a satellite into orbit. The project was entirely civilian and was to be carried under the supervision of MIMI and had scientists from the Space Research Centre(SRC) and Project 144. A special team consisting of foreign scientists was also made which UNMOVIC could not identify. In general the Al-Abid project drew a large amount of foreign expertise particularly from a Brazilian scientist Major General Hugo de Oliveira Piva and later Dr. Gerald Bull who fixed problems with the launch part.

A 50 kg satellite had already been built by Iraqi scientists. The task was to prepare a Launch vehicle capable of putting a 100–300 kg payload in 200–500 km LEO which was to be developed from indigenous systems, namely Scud missiles. The SRC had planned for a schedule to have the first launch by 12 December 1990. When it comes to the first stage various designs and configurations of the Scud missiles were studied including cluster configurations involving four, five or six Scud missiles or modified Scud missiles were studied and similar opinions regarding higher stages were also discussed. By early 1989 Iraqi scientists had concluded on a design of five modified Scud missiles for first stage, a separated modified Scud as second stage and a double base propellant for third stage, in February 1989 the other team of two foreign specialist proposed a different design with a single Scud missile as core stage of first stage with 4-8 strap-on rockets which could be Scuds or S-75 Dvinas, the second stage would be either liquid propelled or solid propelled and would include an AKM, the space research centre would reject this design. Initially focus was concentrated on the first-stage however work on second and third stages had already commenced, initially the second stage was an 880 mm Scud missile of extended burn-time however by beginning on 1989 diameter increased to 1250 mm. Initially the missile had a large payload but General Ra'ad who oversaw Iraq's missile program had the width of the third stage increased to 1.25 m to avoid this hammerhead shape. The Iraqis would then also declare to develop a first-stage rocket engine with four Scud combustion chambers and a single turbopump which would fit a 1250 mm rocket and could operate DETA/UDMH as fuel however work on this would be cancelled after the Gulf War.

== Later development and testing ==
On 5 December 1989 Iraq would test the launch vehicle from a site 230 km south of Baghdad in al-Anbar however this would only be the first-stage, the second and third stages were only steel mockups, a videotape retrieved from the Haider chicken farm that the Iraqis were forced to reveal after a defection in 1995 showed that the Launch vehicle only burned for 45 seconds before it exploded, the Iraqis speculated it to be caused by premature firing of Explosive bolts between the first and dummy second stages, the United States would learn of this test launch on 6 December 1989. After the December 1989 test the Iraqis decided to test the second and third stages separately, they planned a test for autumn 1990 that was known as the Al Kharief(Arabic: الخريف, "autumn"). This project would become controversial as UN inspectors would claim that it was a program for a new missile yet Iraqis would claim that it was just the upper stages of the Al-Abid launch vehicle, it turned out to be both a test platform for the upper stages of the launch vehicle and a test platform for an Iraqi nuclear weapon delivery system. Around mid-1990 the projects progress was very slow urging Iraqi leaders to meet, after such meetings it became clear that the project was being delayed by disagreements between different parties and differing priorities. The project had come to a halt and all progress was suspended after the invasion of Kuwait, according to General Ra'ad no final report was produced and no drawings of the vehicles were available. It was after the 1989 testing that the Iraqis concluded that the performance of the first stage was crucial to the performance of the whole vehicle, Iraq however encountered many problems while developing the second stage as the Scud missiles only provided thrust that could fulfill minimum requirements. The Iraqis initially attempted to increase second stage performance by increasing the expansion ratio of engine nozzle and changing its fuel, the engine nozzle was relatively narrow as the scud missile was designed to operate above sea level. The Iraqis had decided for the second stage to ignite at higher altitude, the Iraqis increased the expansion ratio from 10 to 30 by adding a nozzle skirt and then changed the fuel from TM-185(a kerosene and gasoline mixture) to DETA/UDMH. Iraq focused on improving the Scud engine, work one project 1728 was done parallel to the al-Abid second stage engine. The Iraqis also approached two foreign countries for the engine however the offer was rejected and the two countries offered only to launch the satellite. On 1 December 1990 a test was carried out by project 1728 to use a nozzle extension for increased expansion ratio and UDMH as fuel however the test was carried out at sea level and no cooling was provided to emulate the high-altitude condition at which the rocket was to operate.

== Characteristics ==
The missile in general was a 25 m long 3-stage missile designed to be capable of putting satellites which could be used for reconnaissance, communication and control into LEO.

=== First stage ===
The first stage consisted of four or five bundled Scud missiles, either the al-Husayn missile or al-Abbas missile. Each Scud missile had a width of 0.88 m. The first stage had a total mass of 48,000 kg and a total propellant mass of 26,020 kg having a burn time of 90 s, the propellant flows at a rate of 289.1 kg/s. The total thrust provided in sea level is 660.7 kN while in vacuum its 731.6 kN. Some sources put the total thrust provided as 690 kN. The total specific impulse provided at sea level is 233.0 s and in vacuum is 258 s. The total Impulse provided is 65.8 MN⋅s.

=== Second stage ===
The second stage was also a modified Scud missile having a diameter of 1.25 m. The second stage used 3,760 kg of DETA/UDMH as fuel being flown at a rate of 57.8 kg/s and had an expansion ratio of 30. It being a Scud missile had a relatively narrow nozzle. It provided a total thrust of 146.3 kN in vacuum and a specific impulse of 258 s also in vacuum, the stage had a burn time of 65 s in which it gave a total impulse of 9.5 MN.s.

=== Third stage ===
The third stage had a width of 1.25 m and had a clamshell payload fairing. The third stage is believed to have a SA-2 motor although some sources suggest it might also be a Scud like the previous stages.

== See also ==
- Unha: A North Korean launch vehicle derived from Scud missiles
- Simorgh: An Iranian launch vehicle derived from Scud missiles
