= ICube-1 =

Miniaturized satellite built by IST

iCUBE-1
- Mission type: Technology
- Operator: IST
- COSPAR ID: 2013-066S
- SATCAT no.: 39432
- Website: www.icube.org.pk
- Mission duration: 2 years

Spacecraft properties
- Spacecraft type: 1U CubeSat
- Manufacturer: IST
- Launch mass: 1.08 kilograms (2.4 lb)
- Power: 2 watts

Start of mission
- Launch date: 21 November 2013, 07:10:17 UTC
- Rocket: Dnepr
- Launch site: Dombarovsky 370/13
- Contractor: Kosmotras
- Deployed from: UniSat-5

Orbital parameters
- Reference system: Geocentric
- Regime: Sun-Synchronous
- Perigee altitude: 594 kilometres (369 mi)
- Apogee altitude: 641 kilometres (398 mi)
- Inclination: 97.77 degrees
- Period: 96.91 minutes
- Epoch: 25 May 2014, 03:28:35 UTC

iCube-1 was a miniaturised satellite built by the Institute of Space Technology in Pakistan. Its objective was to conduct a wide range of experiments in imaging, microgravity, biology, nanotechnology, space dynamics, chemistry, space physics and other fields. It also served as a testbed for developing satellite constellations for specific applications.

iCube-1 was launched into Low Earth Orbit aboard the Dnepr launch vehicle from Dombarovsky, Russia. It carried several sensors to collect data for scientific purposes. The satellite was fully autonomous and capable of maintaining its health using its on-board computer.

iCube-1 was a single-unit CubeSat, cubic in shape with sides of 10 centimeters (3.9 inches). Five sides of the satellite were equipped with two triple-junction (ATJ) solar cells, providing the spacecraft with 2 watts of power. Each cell measured 40 by 80 millimeters (1.6 inches × 3.1 inches) and had an efficiency of at least 27.5% at 25°C at the beginning of operations.

iCube-1 carried a camera with a resolution of 640 by 480 pixels. Communications with the ground were achieved through a 435.060 MHz uplink audio frequency-shift keying (AFSK) to provide a data rate of 1,200 bits per second. The 145.947 MHz downlink, which used binary phase-shift keying (BPSK), also provided a data rate of 1,200 bits per second. The satellite also carried CW and AX25 beacons. The entire program cost approximately 3-3.5 million rupees.

According to an IST spokesperson, the launch of iCube-1 was a significant step forward for technology in Pakistan. He emphasized the growing trend of miniaturization and the significantly lower cost of CubeSats compared to larger satellites. This low-cost factor makes CubeSats attractive to researchers who can test their payloads using these small satellites and then incorporate the technology into larger projects.

Initially, iCube-1 transmitted a Continuous Wave (CW) Morse code beacon with the message "iCUBE-1 First CubeSat of Pakistan". Amateur radio operators had the opportunity to listen to these signals on the VHF band. The satellite sent its health data to ground stations and could also be commanded from the Satellite Tracking and Control Station at IST.

== See also ==
- Institute of Space Technology (IST)
- SUPARCO
- ICUBE-Q
- Hamsat
