= TigriSat =

CubeSat

- Mission type: Earth Observation
- Operator: La Sapienza University of Rome · Iraq Ministry of Science and Technology
- COSPAR ID: 2014-033AK
- SATCAT no.: 40043
- Website: tigrisat.com

Spacecraft properties
- Bus: CubeSat 3U
- Launch mass: 3.00 kg
- Power: Solar cells, batteries

Start of mission
- Launch date: 19 June 2014 19:11 UTC
- Rocket: Dnepr
- Launch site: OREN, Dombarovsky
- Contractor: Kosmotras

Orbital parameters
- Reference system: Geocentric
- Regime: Low Earth (SSO)
- Semi-major axis: 7025 km
- Perigee altitude: 612.9 km
- Apogee altitude: 696.3 km
- Inclination: 97.8°
- Period: 97.7 minutes

Transponders
- Band: VHF · UHF · S-band
- Frequency: 435.000 MHz

TigriSat is a CubeSat built in 2014 by a team of Iraqi students at the La Sapienza University of Rome as one of the four satellites deployed within UniSat-6. It uses an RGB camera to detect dust storms over Iraq, and transmits the data to ground stations in Baghdad and Rome. It is considered Iraq's first satellite. It was launched from Orenburg on 19 June 2014 on a Dnepr launch vehicle.

== History ==
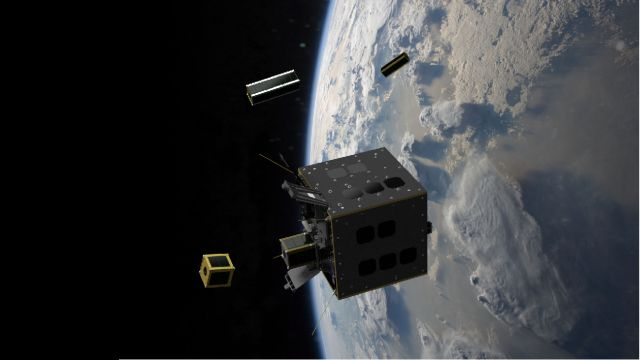
A 3D render showing the deployment phase of the CubeSats including TigriSat boarded inside UniSat-6 satellitel

In 1989, under Saddam Hussein's government, Iraq claimed to have launched a satellite. However, footage showed that the launch vehicle exploded early in liftoff, and called into question whether the launch was an attempted orbital launch. Thus, this satellite is the first launched for Iraq. Its launch, at the time, was record-breaking for the greatest number of satellites launched on a single rocket. In 2018, this satellite's signal was briefly mistaken for that of another CubeSat, PicSat.

== See also ==
- Al-Ta'ir
- Badr
- Omid
