= Remote sensing in geology =

Data acquisition method for earth sciences

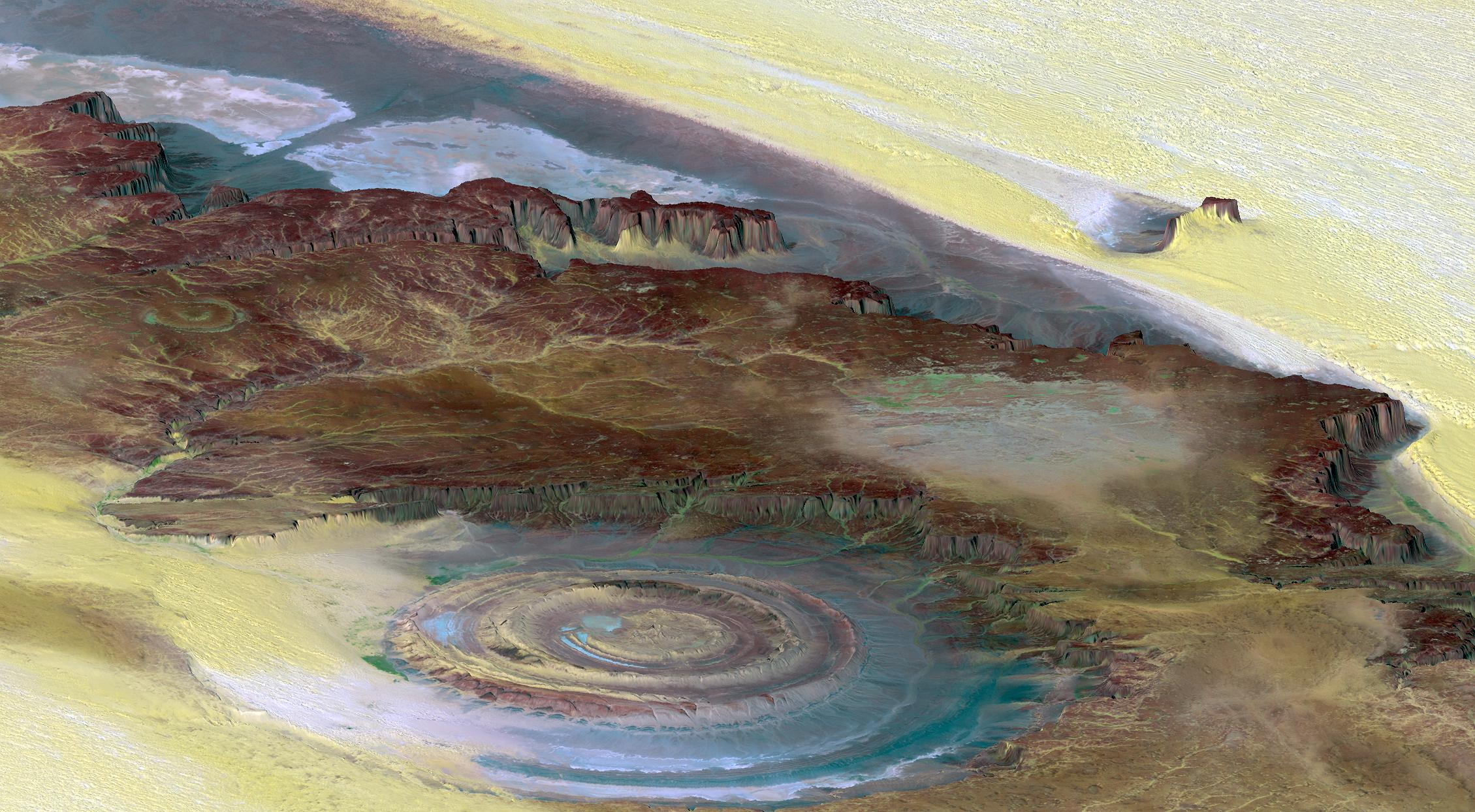
Richat Structure by Shuttle Radar Topography Mission (SRTM). Instead of being a meteorite impact, the landform is more likely to be a collapsed dome fold structure.

Remote sensing is used in the geological sciences as a data acquisition method complementary to field observation, because it allows mapping of geological characteristics of regions without physical contact with the areas being explored. About one-fourth of the Earth's total surface area is exposed land where information is ready to be extracted from detailed earth observation via remote sensing. Remote sensing is conducted via detection of electromagnetic radiation by sensors. The radiation can be naturally sourced (passive remote sensing), or produced by machines (active remote sensing) and reflected off of the Earth surface. The electromagnetic radiation acts as an information carrier for two main variables. First, the intensities of reflectance at different wavelengths are detected, and plotted on a spectral reflectance curve. This spectral fingerprint is governed by the physio-chemical properties of the surface of the target object and therefore helps mineral identification and hence geological mapping, for example by hyperspectral imaging. Second, the two-way travel time of radiation from and back to the sensor can calculate the distance in active remote sensing systems, for example, Interferometric synthetic-aperture radar. This helps geomorphological studies of ground motion, and thus can illuminate deformations associated with landslides, earthquakes, etc.

Remote sensing data can help studies involving geological mapping, geological hazards and economic geology (i.e., exploration for minerals, petroleum, etc.). These geological studies commonly employ a multitude of tools classified according to short to long wavelengths of the electromagnetic radiation which various instruments are sensitive to. Shorter wavelengths are generally useful for site characterization up to mineralogical scale, while longer wavelengths reveal larger scale surface information, e.g. regional thermal anomalies, surface roughness, etc. Such techniques are particularly beneficial for exploration of inaccessible areas, and planets other than Earth. Remote sensing of proxies for geology, such as soils and vegetation that preferentially grows above different types of rocks, can also help infer the underlying geological patterns. Remote sensing data is often visualized using Geographical Information System (GIS) tools. Such tools permit a range of quantitative analyses, such as using different wavelengths of collected data sets in various Red-Green-Blue configurations to produce false color imagery to reveal key features. Thus, image processing is an important step to decipher parameters from the collected image and to extract information.

== Background ==
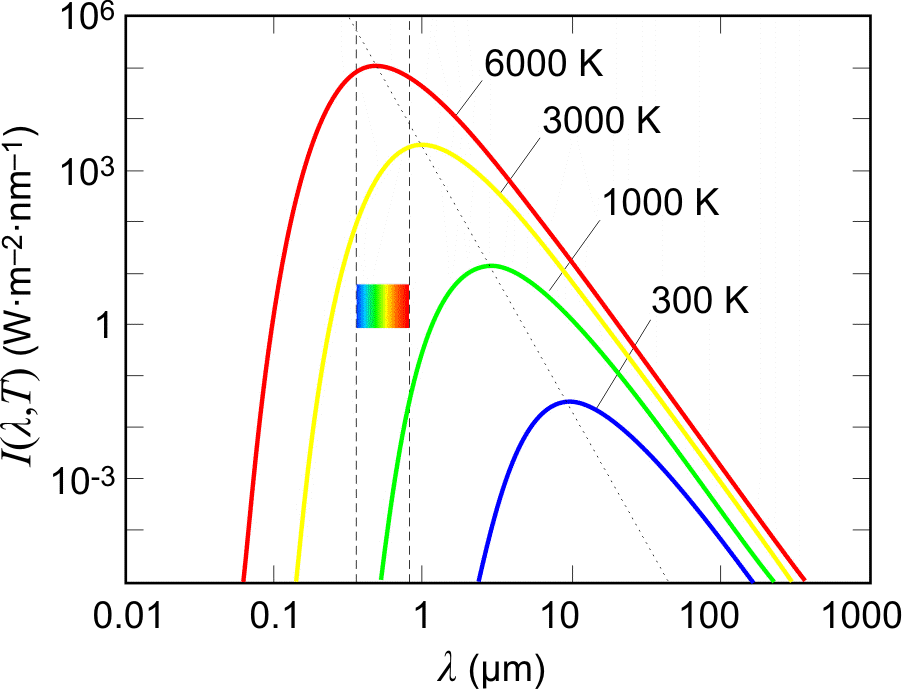
Thermal emission according to Planck's Law. The Sun is approximately 6000K in surface temperature and the emission peaks at visible light. The Earth, approximated to 300K also emit non-visible radiation.

In remote sensing, the electromagnetic radiation acts as the information carrier, with a distance of tens to thousands of kilometers distance between the sensor and the target. Proximal Sensing is a similar idea but often refer to laboratory and field measurements, instead of images showing a large spatial extent. Geophysical methods, for instance Sonar and acoustic methods, shares similar properties with remote sensing but electromagnetic wave is not the sole medium. Geotechnical instrumentations, for example piezometer, tiltmeter and Global Positioning System (GPS), on the other hand, often refer to instruments installed to measure discrete point data, compared to imagery in remote sensing. A suitable sensor sensitive to the particular wavelength region, according to the designated use, is selected and employed to collect the electromagnetic wave reflected or emitted from the target object.

=== Working principles ===
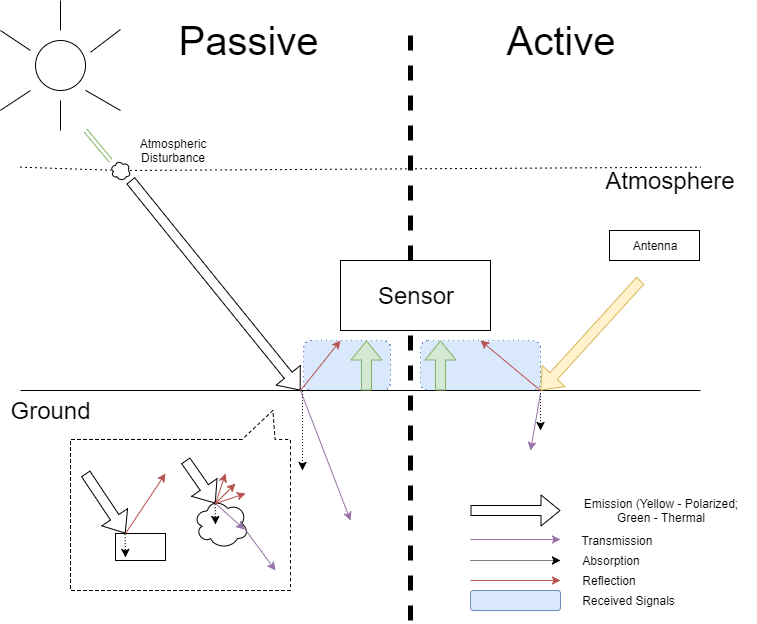
Schematic drawing of Passive (left) and Active (right) remote sensing. The radiation-matter interaction in microscopic scale (absorption, transmission and reflection) is depicted in the left bottom corner speech box. The relative proportion is governed by physio-chemical properties of the material. Planar surface promotes specular reflection while rough surface gives a diffused reflection. The sensor detects (blue box) reflection of solar radiation from the target in passive remote sensing, while active remote sensing systems illuminate the target and detect the reflection. Both passive and active receive naturally emitted thermal radiation emitted according to Planck's Law. They are also subject to atmospheric disturbance.

In remote sensing, two main variables are measured in a typical remote sensing system: the radiance (or intensity) and time of arrival for active systems. The radiance (i.e. returning signal intensity) versus wavelength is plotted to a spectral reflectance curve. As a point to note, the data collected is a blend of both reflection of solar radiation and emission (according to Planck's law) from the object for visible and near infrared (VNIR) region. The thermal infrared (TIR) region measures mainly emission while microwave region record backscattering portion of reflection. The radiance is determined by radiation-matter interactions, which is governed by the physio-chemical properties of the target object. Prominent absorptions in specific wavelength shown on the spectral reflectance curve are the fingerprints for identification using spectroradiometry. The two-way travel time of the radiation could infer the distance as the speed is approximately equal to the speed of light, roughly 3 x 10^8 m/s. This allows application in ranging in light detection and ranging (LiDAR) and Radio detection and ranging (Radar) etc.

Since the sensors are looking through the atmosphere to reach the target, there are atmospheric absorption. Three main atmospheric windows, which allow penetration of radiation, can be identified. They are 0.4–3 micro-meters (Visible and Near-Infrared (VNIR)), 3–14 micro-meters (Thermal Infrared TIR) and few millimeters to meters (microwave). Camera in everyday life is a passive imaging system in VNIR wavelength region. A simple classification of prevailing remote sensing instruments in geology, modified from Rees (2013) in accordance with context of this page. Text in [ ] refers to the related instruments.

Wavelength Range	Wavelength	Sensitive to	Passive	Active Systems (Ranging or Imaging)
VNIR	0.4-3 micro-meters	Intra-atomic electronic transitions	Spectroscopy [spectrometer]; Aerial photography/ Photogrammetry [camera]	[LiDAR]
TIR	3–14 micro-meters	Inter-atomic bond strength in molecules	[TIR Imager]	/
Microwave	few millimeters to meters (microwave)	temperature, terrain roughness, particle size	/	Synthetic Aperture Radar/ InSAR [Radar]

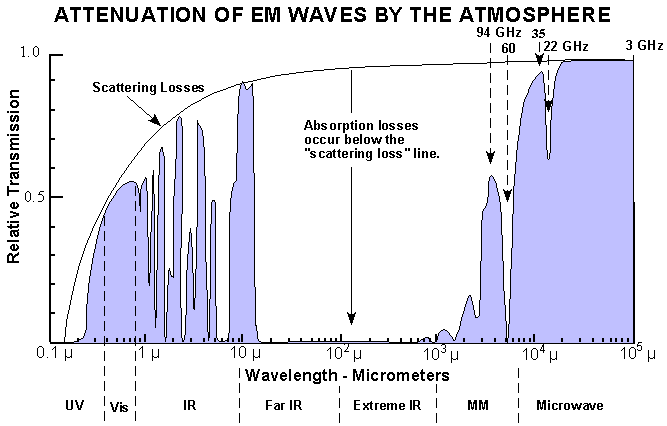
Relative transmission of radiation with respect to wavelength. There are 3 atmospheric windows (VNIR, TIR and Microwave) allowing radiation to penetrate through the atmosphere without prominent absorption. Some corrections are still needed to remove the atmospheric attenuation.

=== Carrying platform ===
The sensor could be spaceborne (carried by satellite), airborne (carried by aircraft, or most recently Unmanned Aerial Vehicle (UAV)) or ground-based (sometimes called proximal sensing). Data acquired from higher elevation captures a larger field of view/ spatial coverage, but the resolutions are often lower. Prior mission planning regarding flight path, weight load, carrying sensor etc. have to be done before deployment. The resolution requirement is often high in geological studies, hence airborne and ground-based systems prevail in surveying.

== Advantages and limitations ==
Common geological applications
Wavelength Range	Tools	Common Applications in Geology
VNIR	Multi/Hyper-spectral Imaging	Mineral/ Rock Identification
VNIR	Photogrammetry	Landform Studies
VNIR	LiDAR	Geodetic Survey
TIR	Thermal infrared Imaging	Thermal Anomalies
Microwave	Synthetic Aperture Radar	Displacement Time-series

The main advantage of employing remote sensing to deal with geological problem is that it provides direct information on the surface cover using a synoptic coverage or sometimes stereoscopic view. Hence the big picture of kinematics could be better appreciated. It also reduces the burden of field work required for the area through synoptic studies of the area of interest. The spectral vision allows identification of rock attributes for surficial mapping. The resolution however controls the accuracy.

There is a trade-off between spatial resolution and spectral resolution. Since the intensity of incident ray is fixed, for a higher spectral resolution, it is expected to have a lower spatial resolution (one pixel represent larger area) to maintain an up-to-standard signal-to-noise ratio for analysis. Also, the data volume for transmission is limited due to signal engineering problem. One can never obtain data with maximum resolutions in all spatial, spectral and radiometric resolutions due to these constraints. The temporal resolution could be understood as both the revisiting frequency and the deformation duration. For instance an instantaneous landslide or sinkhole collapse could hardly be recorded without high speed camera, while relics could be imaged into time-series where the temporal change, for instance ice calving could be revealed.

Another deficiency is the inconsistent data acquisition method, plus their interpretation schemes. As a result, an ideal database is hardly feasible because of dynamic environmental conditions in different locality. Instead, repeated reconnaissance is suggested for studying a specific area.

Field observation and reconnaissance remains irreplaceable and shall never be taken over completely by remote sensing because field data greatly support remote sensing data interpretation. Remote sensing should better be considered to be complementary which aims to provide instantaneous views of different scale, perspective or spectral vision. Subsurface mapping by Geophysical survey and simulation models still play an important role in the 3 dimensional characterization of soil underground. A word of caution is that there is no such an ‘ideal’ sensor capable or optimized to study everything. It is often up to scientist's preference and experience to pick which dataset and extract information. For instance aerial photographs could be more sensible in cloud-free area, but otherwise radar may perform better for overcast weather.

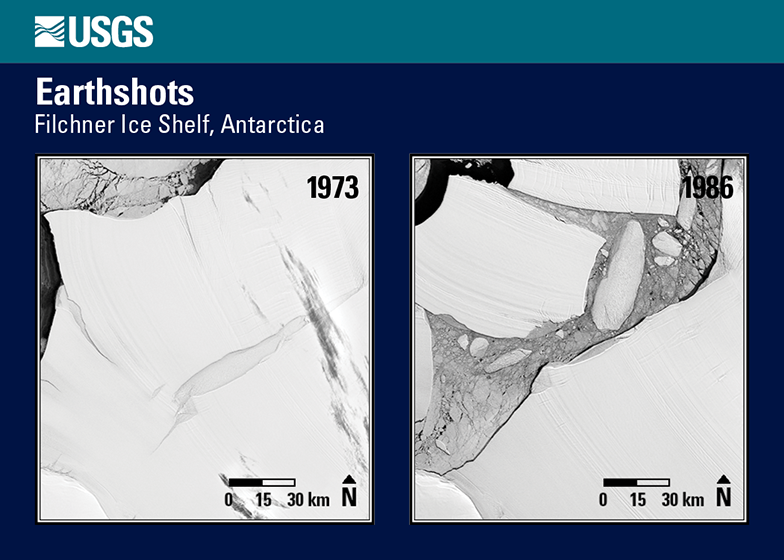
The break off of Filchner Ice Shelf, Antarctica. The near-infrared reflectance image distinguishes water from ice - Landsat

== Geological mapping ==
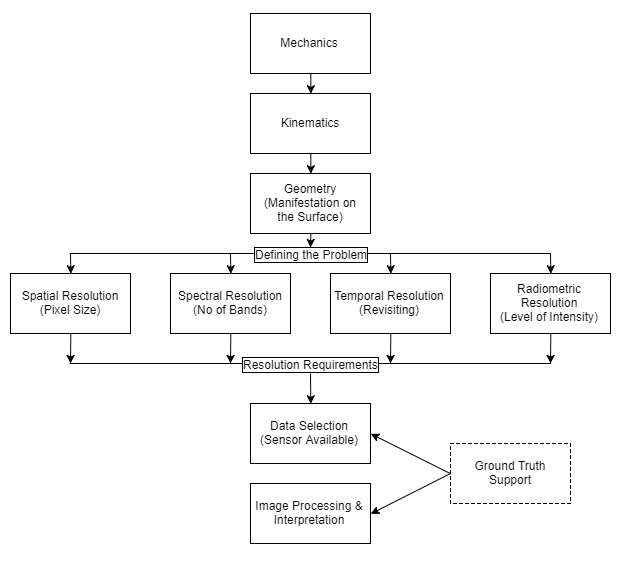
A typical workflow for tackling geological problem, starting from defining the problem down to data selection and interpretation, inspired by Gupta (1991)

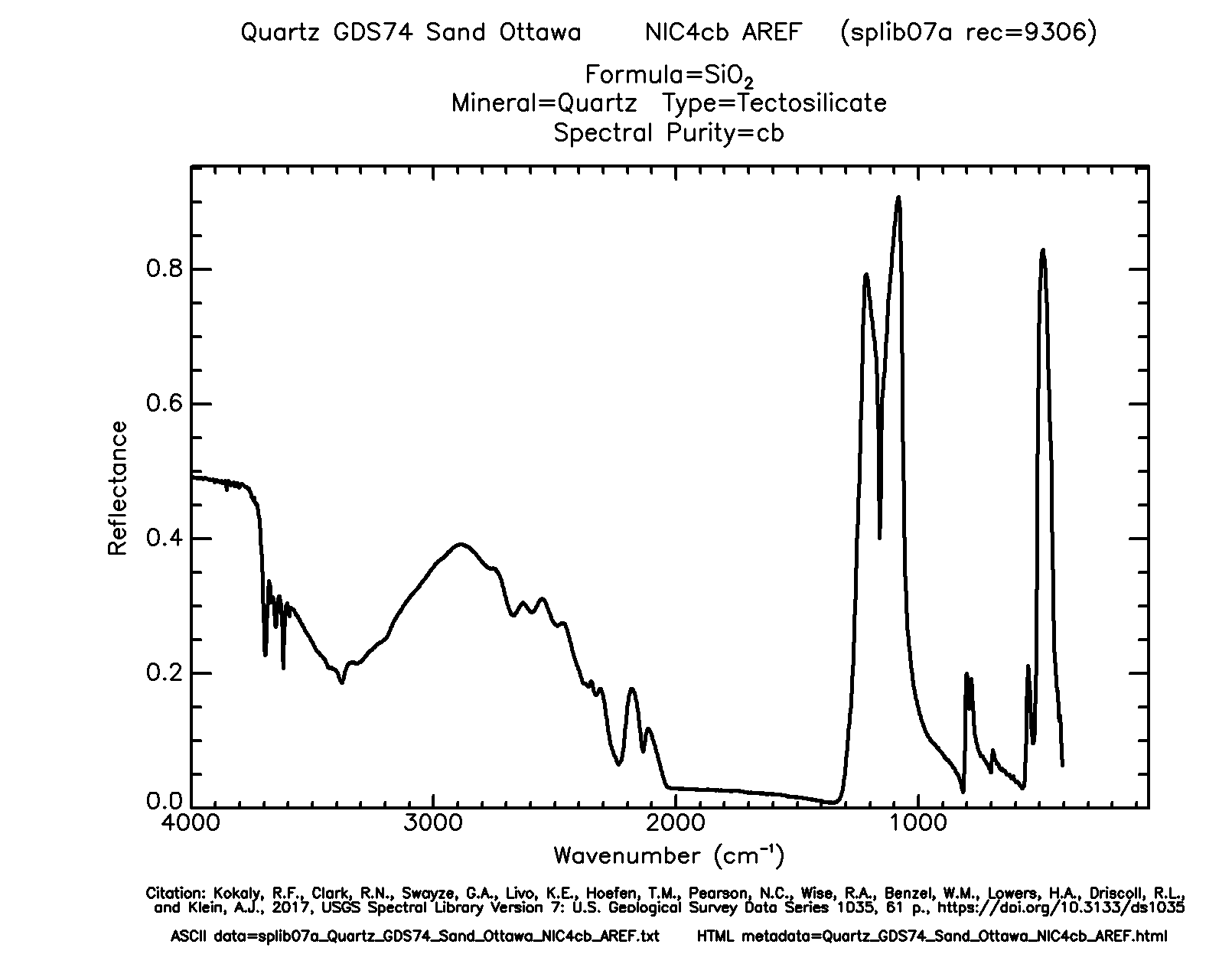
An example of a mineral quartz spectral reflectance curve

Remote sensing can aid surficial geological mapping and landform characterization.

=== Spectral features ===
The visible and near infrared (VNIR) and thermal infrared (TIR) are sensitive to intra-atomic electronic transitions and inter-atomic bond strength respectively can help mineral and rock identifications. The instrument in use is called spectroradiometer in lab and imaging spectrometer or multi-/ hyper-spectral scanner as imaging remote sensors. Provided that the land is not obscured by dense vegetation, some characteristics of superficial soil (the unconsolidated sedimentary materials covering the land as surficial deposits from weathering and erosion of bedrock) may be measured with a penetration depth into air-soil interface of about half of wavelength used (e.g. green light (~0.55 micro-meters) gives depth of penetration into ~0.275 micro-meters). Hence most remote sensing systems using the VNIR wavelength region give characteristics of surface soil, or sometimes exposed rock. Another parameter controlling the overall reflectance is surface roughness. The same surface can appear rough in VNIR may appear smooth in microwave, similar to what we perceive when we use a meter rule to measure roughness where surface fluctuation are in cm-scale. As grain size decreases, surface roughness increases and hence overall reflectance increases as diffuse reflection, instead of specular reflection, dominates. Specular reflection by smooth surface, for example calm water, gives little backscattering and hence appear dark. As an example, ice is mostly transparent in a large piece but becomes highly reflective when smashed into small grains.

==== Mineral and rock ====
In lithological composition studies, lab and field spectroradiometry of proximal and remote sensing can help. The spectral reflectance data from imaging spectrometry employing short wavelength, for example form Airborne visible/infrared imaging spectrometer (AVIRIS), provide chemical properties of the target object. For instance, the iron content, which is indicative of the soil fertility and the age of sediment, could be approximated. For soil with high iron oxide, which is red in colour, should give higher reflectance in red wavelength portion and diminishes in blue and green. There may also be absorption at 850-900 nm. The Redness Index and absorption area in 550 nm in spectral reflectance curve are examples to quantify iron content in soil.

To identify mineral, available spectral reflectance libraries, for instance the USGS Spectral Library, summarize diagnostic absorption bands for many materials not limited to rocks and minerals. This helps create a mineral map to identify the type of mineral sharing similar spectra, with minimal in situ field work. The mineralogy is identified by matching collected sample with spectral libraries by statistical method, such as partial least squares regression. In addition to high signal-to-noise ratio (>40:1), a fine spatial resolution, which limits the number of elements inside one single pixel, also promotes decision accuracy. There are also digital subpixel spectral unmixing tools available. The USGS Tetracorder which applies multiple algorithms to one spectral data with respect to the spectral library is sensitive and give promising results. The different approaches are summarized and classified in literature but unfortunately there is no universal recipe for mineral identification.

For rocks, be they igneous, sedimentary or metamorphic, most of their diagnostic spectral characteristics of mineralogy are present in longer wavelength (SWIR and TIR), which is for example present in the ASTER mission. This is due to the sensitivity of vibrational bands of longer wavelength. As opposed to the automatic statistical interpretation mentioned above for minerals, it is more advisable to adopt visual interpretation for identification of rock because the surficial alteration of rock may exhibit very different spectral responses.

Several indices are proposed for rock type identification, such as Quartz Index, Carbonate Index and Mafic Index, where Di is the data of the i-th band in ASTER.

- Carbonate Index (CI): D13/D14
- Quartz Index (QI): D11*D11 / D10*D12
- Mafic Index (MI): D12/D13

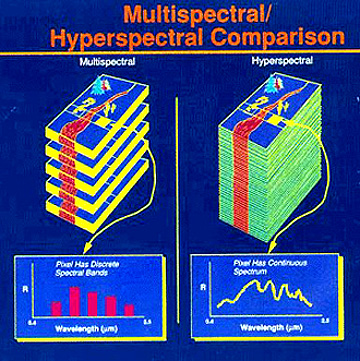
Hyperspectral imaging gives high spectral resolution, but as a trade-off the spatial and radiometric resolutions are lower

==== Soil ====
Surficial soil is a good proxy to the geology underneath. Some of the properties of soil, alongside lithology mentioned above, are retrievable in remote sensing data, for instance Landsat ETM+, to develop the soil horizon and therefore aid its classification.

===== Soil texture and moisture content =====
The amount of moisture within soil particles is governed by the particle size and soil texture as the interstitial space may be filled with air for dry soil and water for saturated soil. Essentially, the finer the grain size, the higher capability to hold moisture. As mentioned above, wetter soil is brighter than dry soil in radar image. For short wavelength VNIR region, in the same theory, clayey surface with smaller grain size promoting more backscattering should give higher spectral response. However, the higher soil moisture and organic contents makes clay darker in images, compared to silty and sandy soil cover after precipitation. With regard to VNIR region, as the moisture content increases, more prominent absorption (at 1.4, 1.9, 2.7 micrometers, and sometimes at 1.7 for hydroxyl absorption band) take place. On the other hand, radar is sensitive to one more factor: dielectric constant. Since water has a high dielectric constant, it has high reflectivity and hence more backscattering takes place, i.e. appears brighter in radar images. Therefore, soil appears brighter with higher soil moisture content (with the presence of capillary water) but appears dark for flooded soil (specular reflection). Quantitatively, while soil texture is determined by statistical means of regression with calibration, scientists also developed a Soil Water Index (SWI) for long-term change detection. Another approach is surface energy balance model, which makes prediction on the actual evapotranspiration.

In short, the soil moisture overall reflectance could be tabulated.

Tools	Dry Soil	Wet Soil	Flooded Soil
Radar	darker (energy penetrate into soil of low dielectric constant)	brighter (water has high dielectric constant)	very dark (specular reflection)
VNIR	brighter (less absorption)	darker (prominent water absorption)	same as water (low penetration depth)

===== Soil organic carbon =====
Soil organic carbon is mainly derived from proximal sensing using mid infrared reflectance. A darker soil colour results from the saturated organic matter plus variable amount of black humic acid and soil moisture. The higher the amount of organic content in the soil, incident energy would be greatly absorbed and as a result lower reflectance is expected in general. The contrast in soil colour allows quantitative analysis of band depth analysis, principal component analysis and modeling.

===== Soil salinity =====
Soil salinity is the result of insufficient rainwater precipitation which leads to accumulation of soluble salt in soil horizon. The spectral proximal sensing in VNIR is sensitive to absorption of water in hydrated evaporate minerals, most prominently at 505 nm, 920 nm, 1415 nm and 2205 nm. For even more saline soil, 680, 1180 nm and 1780 nm would also give lower reflectance (higher absorption) and higher reflectance at 2200 nm possibly due to the loss of crystallinity in clay minerals. The spectral curve also shows a decreasing overall slope from 800 nm to 1300 nm for higher salinity. The overall reflectance curve in all wavelength increases with higher salt concentration, while the compositions of salt would show some variations in absorption bands.

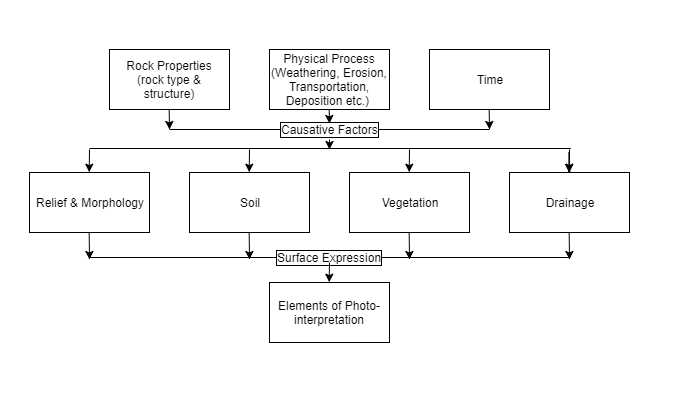
The surface manifestations of the geological kinematics provide clues for photo interpretation, inspired by Gupta (1991)

=== Geomorphology ===
3-dimensional geomorphological features arising from regional tectonics and formation mechanisms could also be understood from a perspective of small scale images showing a large area acquired in elevation. The topography of an area is often characterized by volcanic activity or orogenesis. These mountain building processes are determined by the stress-strain relation in accordance with rock types. They behave as elastic/ plastic/ fracturing deformations, in response to different kinetics. Remote sensing techniques provide evidence such as observed lineament, global scale mountain distribution, seismicity and volcanic activities to support crustal scale tectonics and geodynamics studies. Additional spectral information also helps. For example, the grain size differentiates snow and ice. Aside from a planar geological map with cross-sections, sometimes 3-dimensional view from stereo-photos or representation in Digital Elevation Model (DEM) could aid the visualization. In theory, LiDAR gives the best resolution up to cm grade while radar gives 10m grade because of its high sensitivity to small scale roughness. Oblique images could greatly enhance the third-dimension, but users should bear in mind the shadowing and distortions.

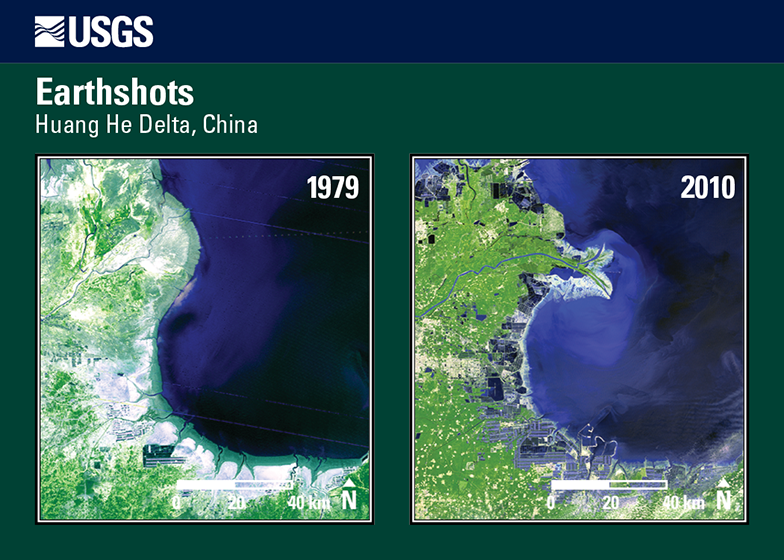
The deltaic landform at the mouth of HuangHe, China – Landsat

== Inaccessible areas ==
Although field mapping is the most primary and preferable way to acquire ground truth, the method does not work when areas become inaccessible, for example the conditions are too dangerous or extreme. Sometimes political concerns bar scientists’ entering. Remote sensing, on the other hand, provides information of the area of interest sending neither a man nor a sensor to the site.

=== Desert ===
Desert area is shaped by eolian processes and its landforms by erosion and deposition. The stereopairs of aerial photos provide three-dimensional visualization for the land feature while hyperspectral image provide grain scale information for grain size, sand composition etc. The images are often of high phototones in short wavelengths in VNIR corresponding to the scanty vegetation and little moisture. Another tool is radar, which has the capability to penetrate surficial sand, a material of low dielectric constant. This see-through characteristic, notably of the L-band (1.25 GHz) microwave of 1–2 m penetration, allows subsurface mapping and possibly identification of past aquifer. The paleohydrography in Sahara Desert and Gobi Desert is revealed and further studies using airborne P-band (435 MHz) for penetration of 5 m is proposed in future research.

=== Political sensitive area ===
Politics poses challenge to scientific research. One example is the Tibesti Mountains, which is remote and politically unstable in recent decades due to conflicts over uranium deposit underneath. The area, however, could possibly serve as one spectacular example of intracontinental volcanism or hotspot. Detailed studies of the area divided into Western, Central and Eastern Tibesti Volcanic Province shows no significant sign of spatially progressive volcanism, and hence it is unlikely to be a hotspot as the manifestation of Hawaiian or Galapagos Islands. More data and systematic field survey and studies, for instance geochemical and radiometric dating, are great topics to focus on in the near future. The Tibesti board swell dome is also studied as a regional river system to estimate the uplift rate.

Water bodies, for instance ocean and glaciers, could be studied using remote sensing. Here are two examples for plankton and glacier mapping.

The bloom of photosynthesizing phytoplankton is an ecological proxy to favorable environmental conditions. Satellite remote sensing in VNIR wavelength region help locate sporadic event of change in ocean colour due to relative increase in related absorption in spectral curve. Different band math (e.g. band ratio algorithms and spectral band difference) are developed to cater coastal and open water, and even some specific types of bloom (e.g. Coccolithophore blooms and Trichodesmium blooms). The capability of real-time monitoring by combined use of long term satellite data allows better insight into the ocean dynamics.

The mapping of glaciers is facilitated by remote sensing in contrast with carrying heavy equipment to dangerous icy land. Some notable applications include mapping of clean-ice and debris-covered glaciers, glacier fluctuation records, mass balance and volume change studies to aid generating topographic map and quantitative analysis. Similarly, automated approach using band math and DEM calculations using high resolution data is requisite to look into the glacial variations due to dynamic environmental conditions.

== Geologic hazards ==
Geological hazards cause casualties and serious damage to properties. While it is almost impossible to prevent naturally occurring disasters, their impact could be reduced and minimized with proper prior risk assessment and planning.

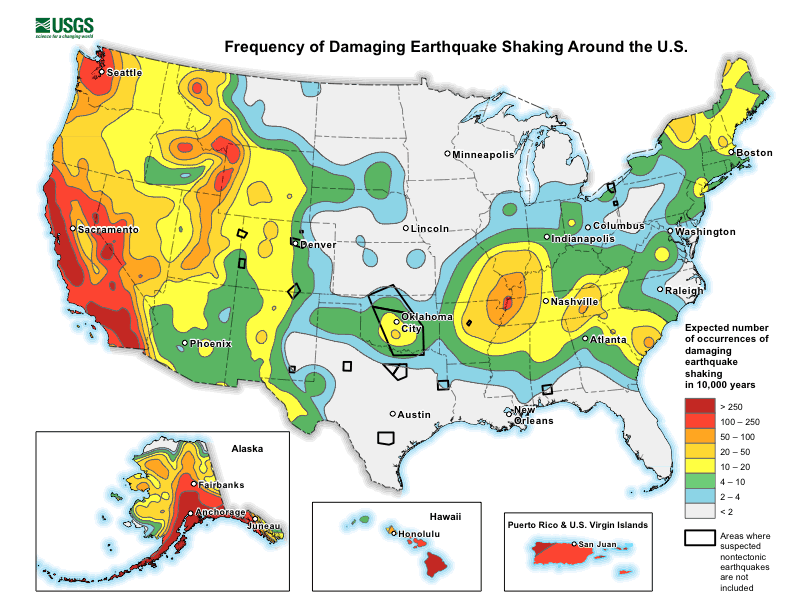
U.S. Seismic Hazard Maps 2014

=== Earthquakes ===
Earthquakes manifest itself in movement of earth surface. Remote sensing can also help earthquake studies by two aspects. One is to better understand the local ground condition. For instance some soil type, which is prone to liquefaction (e.g. saturated loose alluvial material), do more damage under vibration and therefore earthquake hazard zoning may help in reducing property loss. Another one is to locate historical earthquakes in neotectonism (past 11000 years) and analysis its spatial distribution, and hence fault zones with structural ruptures are mapped for further investigations. From a geodetic perspective, the radar technique (SAR Interferometry, also called InSAR) provides land displacement measurement up to cm scale. SAR interferometry is a technology utilizing multiple SAR images recording the backscattering of microwave signal. The returning signal can be used to estimate the distance between ground and satellite. When two images are obtained at the same point but at different time, some pixels showing delayed returns reveal displacement, assuming no ground change. A displacement map (interferogram) is generated to visualize the changes with a precision up to a half of the wavelength i.e. cm grade. Another similar technique is Global Positioning System (GPS), which records the displacement with time of discrete points through trilateration of microwave GPS satellite signals. The same idea and principle to measure ground displacement could also be extended to other natural hazards monitoring, such as volcanisms, landslides and avalanches. The mid-IR thermal (11–12 micrometer) satellite images have shown some thermal fields in geological active areas, such as lineation and fault systems. Aside from these long-lived thermal fields, there are some positive thermal anomalies of 3–4 °C on land surface or around −5 °C for sea water in earthquake epicenter areas. The contrast appears 7–14 days prior to the earth movement. Though the observation is supported by laboratory experiments, the possible causes of these differences are still debatable.

=== Tsunami ===
Mangrove offers protection against tsunami and storms from sweeping away inland areas because the mangrove fringes were damaged and took all the energy. Remote sensing of mangrove and vegetation as a natural barrier to manage risks therefore becomes a hot topic. The recent advancement and development is highly anticipated in the near future, especially as hyperspectral imaging system and very high resolution (up to sub meter grade) satellite images prevails. New classification schemes distinguishing species from composition could be developed for environmental studies. Estimation leaf area, canopy height, biomass and productivity could also be improved with the emergence of existing and forthcoming sensors and algorithms. Tsunami-induced inundation leads to change in coastal area, which could be quantified by remote sensing. Split-based approach to divide large images into subimages for further analysis by redefining change detection threshold have reduced computation time and have shown to be consistent with manual mapping of affected areas.

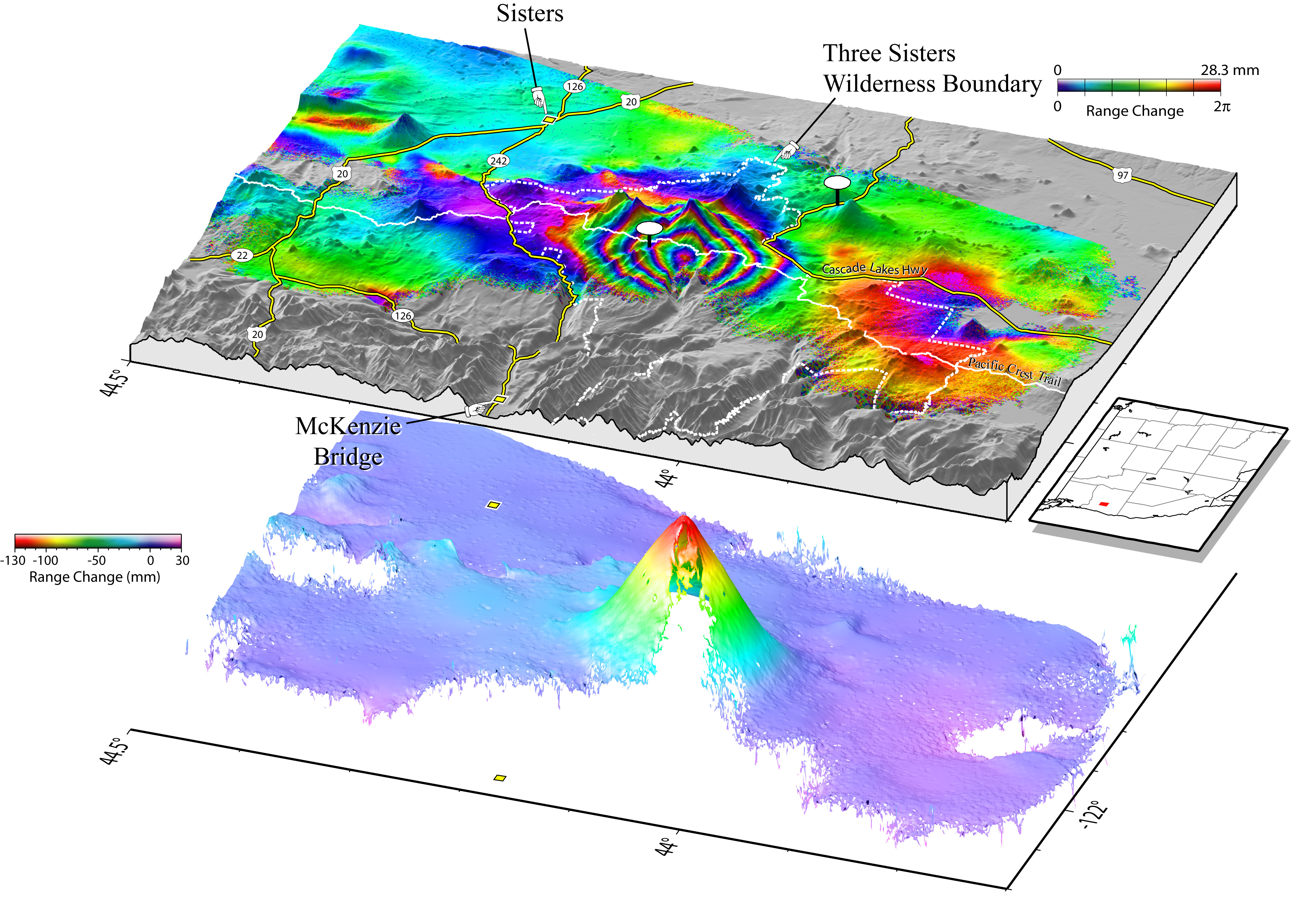
An interferogram showing ground movement in the Three Sisters Wilderness, where eruption occurred 1500 years ago. Each colour contour represents an equal amount of uplift, which is possibly caused by magma accumulation at about 7 km depth. The uplift is about 130mm with lateral extent of 20 km. The white thumbtacks are GPS stations. ENVISAT/ Wicks, C.W. et al., 2002, USGS

=== Volcanism ===
The dynamic magma underneath plates we are living on induces volcanic activity on Earth's surface. To advance the understanding in volcanological science and active volcano monitoring, the main data streams aided by remote sensing include surface deformation and thermal measurement plus the gas flux and composition. Seismicity is considered geophysical method on the other hand. The data could be collected throughout the eruption cycle, from unrest, to eruption then relaxation. For example, the Ultraviolet (UV) and VNIR region is sensitive to sulfur dioxide, one of the volcanic gases. BrO (formed from the bromine explosion within plumes) and CO_{2} are also possible candidates for volcanic monitoring these days. The thermal disturbance, for instance through temperature change in crater lakes and injection of hot gas into the atmosphere, could be detected using TIR sensors to automate volcano thermal alerts. The uplift and subsidence of ground could be quantified remotely by InSAR technique. The surficial manifestation of volcanism tends to favor simple geometries while complexities are introduced by subsurface interactions. While remote sensing is able to collect data of ground, 3-D modeling using finite element analysis added with geophysical subsurface survey is highly encouraged.

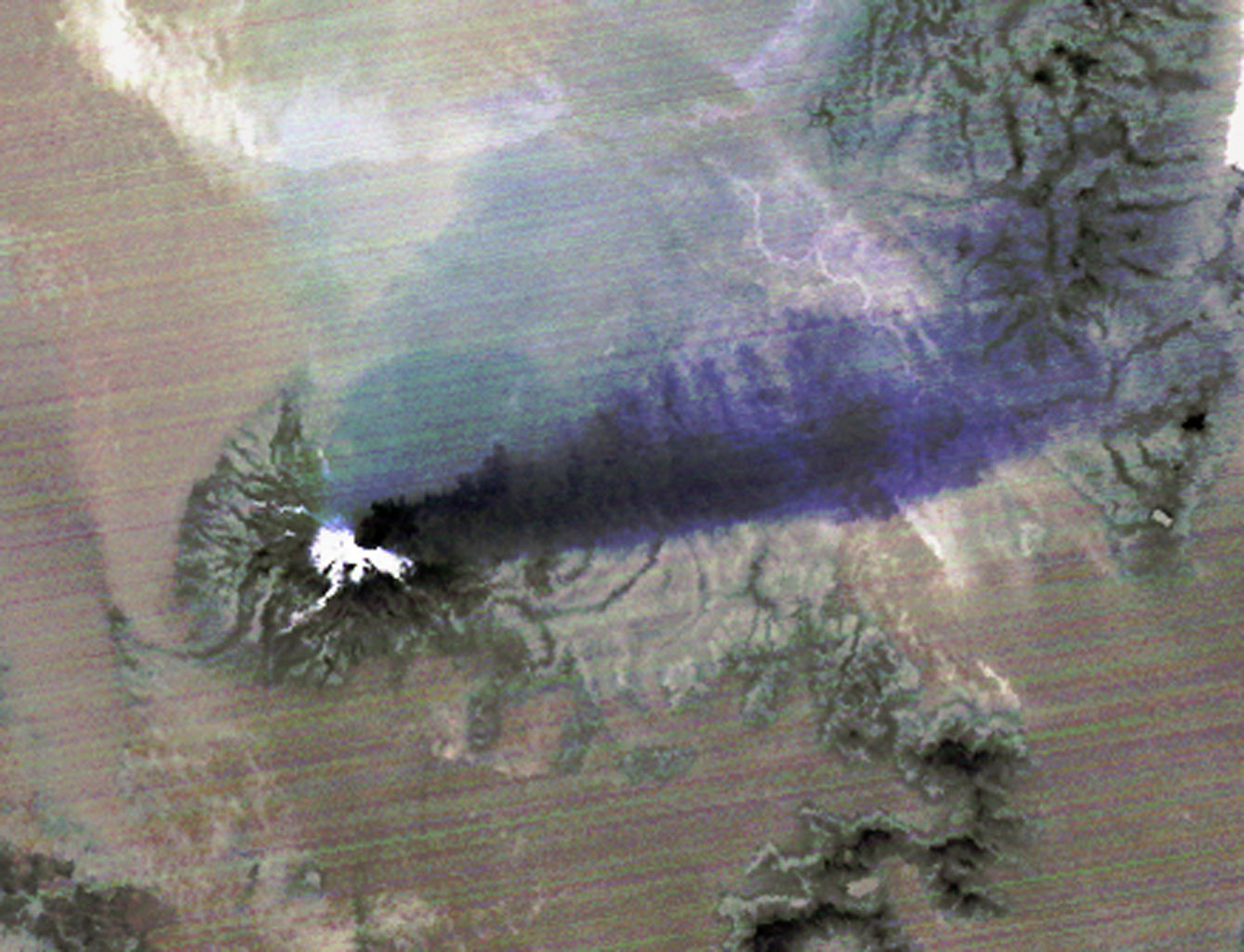
An ASTER night time thermal infrared image capturing 2015 eruption of Calbuco Volcano in Chile. Hot eruptive material at the summit appears in white (hot), with a purple plume streaming to the right, indicating that it is ash-laden.

=== Landslides ===
Landslide is one form of mass wasting caused by gravity and slope instability. The rock and debris fall downward and outward from slope rapidly. Apart from site characterization through geological mapping, many of the remote sensing tools mentioned could be employed. For example, the use of aerial photos to update landslide inventory is popular in Hong Kong landslide studies. The LiDAR technique to create a High Resolution Digital Elevation Model (HRDEM) and Digital Terrain Model (DTM) with vegetation cover is crucial to the quantification of slope, slope aspect, stream power, drainage density and many more parameters for landslide hazard models. Microwave radar can also take part in landslide recognition in synthetic aperture radar (SAR) images and monitoring through the InSAR technique which effectively shows small scale deformation. Furthermore, InSAR maps enable the semi-automatic identification, mapping, and classification of landslides. The hazard risk management could be further discussed using geographical information system (GIS).

=== Land subsidence ===
Land subsidence primarily consists of the lowering of the ground surface. Interferometric synthetic-aperture radar enables accurate, precise, and cost-effective measurement and monitoring of this phenomenon over wide areas. Aerial LiDAR has also been successfully used for monitoring large-scale land subsidence in wide areas.

== Economic geology ==
In the context of economic geology, the surficial data help locate possible reserves of natural resources.

=== Mineral and petroleum exploration ===
The occurrence of nature reserves that are exploitable is in close association with the surrounding geology. Feasible resources explorations should be backed up by accurate geological models to locate prospect ore and petroleum deposits from a preliminary regional overview. Remote sensing can provide scalable investigation as the exploration program progress at a reasonable expenditure. One example is to monitor the surface deformation in a mine using InSAR time series. Another example is using short wavelength region in VNIR to estimate the petroleum reservoir because VNIR can provide both accurate distance measurement by lidar and spectral data from spectral scanning. One point to bear in mind is the inherit limitation, that remote sensing is for surface detection while natural resources are concentrated in depth, therefore its use is somewhat limited. Nonetheless, there are some proxies providing valuable inputs, including the following examples

1. stratigraphical-lithological: some minerals are syngenetic or epigenic with host rocks
2. geomorphological: mechanical concentration of minerals in morphology
3. structural: intersection of structural features to form structural traps
4. rock alteration: quartz-feldspars, carbonates, hydroxyl-bearing minerals, sheet silicates, iron oxides (limonite), commonly manifest as ring or halo with zoned alteration, with the aid of image enhancement
5. geobotanical: vegetation stress and abnormal growth may be due to metal in soil

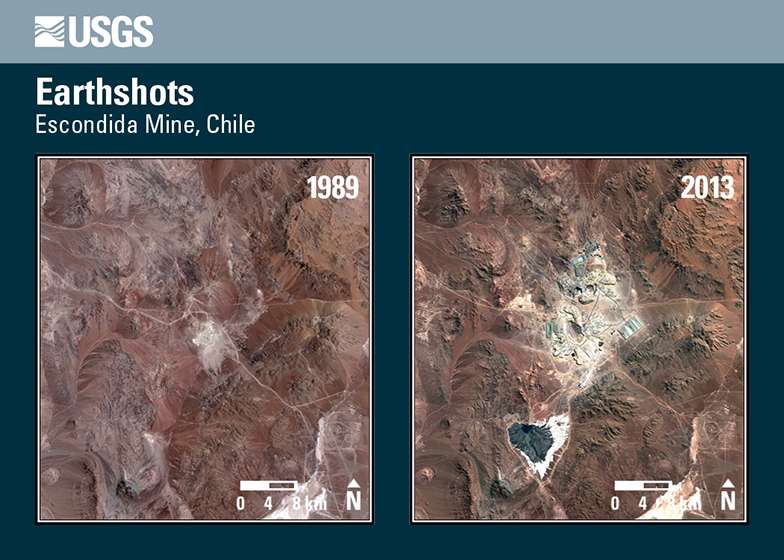
The expansion of tailing impoundment to save water and minimize environmental impact in Escondida Mine, Chile, world's largest source of copper - Landsat

A new method is proposed in respect to the above rock alteration means, in light of the deficiencies in low reflectance due to vegetation cover and the ambiguity of some minerals, for instance kaolinite which may or may not be resultant altered mineral. The overall spectral shape from hyperspectral imaging is considered first, followed by absorption bands, in their algorithm. Correlation coefficients for each pixel is then calculated by comparison between the remote sensing data and ground field data. The decision would be assigned to each pixel by the most susceptible dominant object, but not by setting up threshold.

=== Groundwater investigations ===
Targeting groundwater resources for supply is one of the ultimate goals in water management. While much of the information is indeed provided from hydrogeology, geophysical methods and drilling, the remote sensing technique, using the same principle to integrate data collected for the surface, can infer possible confined/ unconfined aquifers. For instance in radar data (ground penetrating radar), which is able to penetrate the ground deep into meters, may show some diffuse reflection for ‘rough’ surface relative to the wavelength used. The change in lithology may suggest soft rock and unconsolidated sediments, where porosity is high.

== Vegetation ==
The surficial vegetation studies are mainly accomplished by multispectral or hyperspectral image analysis, mainly because of the lower penetration depth and higher resolutions of VNIR wavelength region. There are a multitude of sensors, image processing and classification algorithms and result evaluation schemes from ancillary data available in vegetation analysis. As an example, rangeland characterization with regard to biomass quantity and quality could be inferred from hyperspectral data. The detection of photosynthetic active (standing live) versus non-photosynthetic active (standing dead) and their ratio in the area of interest supports the quantification of biomass. The quality of forage presented in Carbon:Nitrogen ratio could be estimated through hyperspectral data manipulation with greater than 80% accuracy.

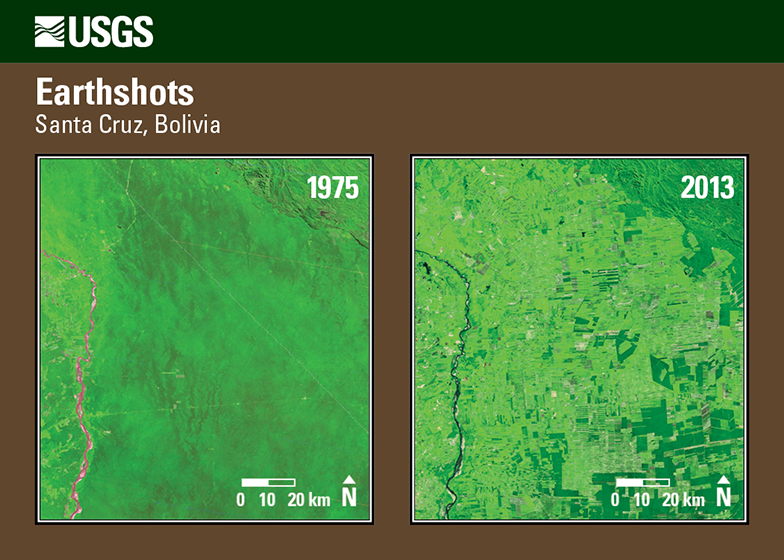
The vegetation have changed from dense forest to rectangular soybean cultivation land in Santa Cruz, Bolivia - Landsat

]From a geological perspective, some superficial cover may obscure the area of interest in an image. With vegetation, the time-series of Normalized difference Vegetation Index (NDVI) which characterizes crop growth could derive soil patterns. The biogeographical gradient incorporating environmental parameters, such as floristic conditions, precipitation and temperature also provide clues to soil cover. Spectral unmixing technique assuming that the total reflectance of a pixel is a linear mix of component reflectance delineates objects contributing the resultant signal received in the sensor. Some other parameters and soil proxies such as non-photosynthetic vegetation cover, lichens, Plant Functional Types and Ellenberg indicator values are possible for soil characterization.

== Planetary observation ==
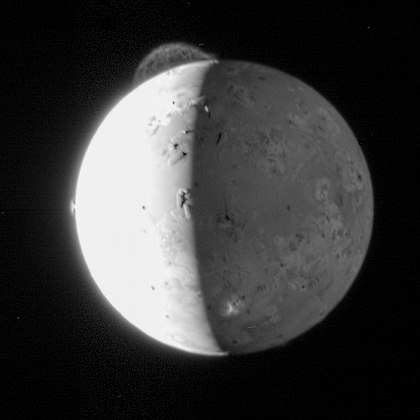
Volcanism on Io to lose heat imaged by LORRI camera of the New Horizons probe

Aside from the Earth, remote sensing has made planetary exploration possible without sending an astronaut into space. For most planetary explorations, due to the thick atmosphere, radar is a suitable instrumentation to investigate planetary surface. Radar can penetrate the atmosphere and detect the surface roughness. Also, topographic maps could be derived from radar altimetry and InSAR methods, for instance in the mapping of Venus. As an example of planetary applications using remote sensing could be illustrated by the volcanism observation on Io, which features the highest number of active volcanoes per square kilometer in the Solar System. While the importance of Io Volcanology is well documented as textbooks, new observations point out that the temporal evolution of spectral ratio between 2:5 micrometer thermal emissions (thermal signature) could infer eruption modes, from lava fountain down to silicic lava flows. Recent suggestion have been made to improve the spatial resolution to locate more accurately the heat source vent, so as to elucidate the unsolved puzzle of the volcanology, which is strongly related to the tidal heating caused by the orbital eccentricity of Jupiter. Modeling has shown that a suitable distance between the surveyed ground and the sensor has to be maintained to ensure a meaningful pixel size to resolve the Io surface. Remote sensing by satellite also reduces jittering as the sensor is held stable in space and gives accurate data in the absence of atmosphere for terrestrial observations, notwithstanding the strong radiation zone in Jupiter which dramatically limits sensor lifetime. All these promotes future instrumentation and orbit design.

== Image processing ==
Image processing is crucial to convert raw data into useful information. For imaging remote sensing, where spectral data are collected and recorded in pixels of an image, a two dimensional representation. After removal of noise and calibration, images are then geo-referenced to relate pixel to real-life geography. The first-hand data are then corrected to remove noise such as atmospheric disturbance, structural effects and distortion. Remote sensing data are often validated by ground truth, which usually serves as training data in image classification to ensure quality.

Aerial and satellite imagery interpretation can be achieved by a human interpreter or through computation. Human interpretation of geologic features can be very high quality if the expert has a thorough understanding of the subject they are interpreting, e.g. geomorphology. However, visual interpretation of aerial photos is time-consuming and highly experienced interpreters are expensive. Digital supervised or unsupervised landform classification employing crisp or fuzzy clustering logic have opened new possibility to the viable solutions. However, computation algorithms are subject to scale dependence matters and arbitrary definition of class boundaries. The presence of vegetation cover and rugged terrain may also reduce the applicability. Statistical and computational algorithms to identify correlations are developing vigorously for image analysis. For example, the emergence of non-parametric classifiers such as neural network becomes an alternative in classifying massive data.

== Integration with GIS ==
The remote sensing technique is intimately connected to later data interpretation and visualization, which is one of the capabilities in Geographical Information System (GIS). The GIS also allows input of other information such as socio-economic conditions and biophysical conditions in terms of layers. Further analyses in the same spatial extent are carried out and thematic maps are then generated for presentation. By no means could the application by integration of GIS and remote sensing be exhaustive, but here the topics of hydrology, landslide and urban planning are discussed.

=== Hydrology ===
There are a variety of applications of GIS and remote sensing data in water management, ranging from exploration, modeling of subsurface flow and natural recharge, pollution control and hydrogeologic process monitoring. In essence, the topography, vegetation cover, drainage landforms and aquifer types could be inferred from remote sensing data and images from various types of sensors and platform. A case study in Burdur, Turkey presenting the use of remote sensing data and spatial analysis performed by GIS is one of the pioneer projects. Remote sensing collected data for geology and lineament density while GIS derived drainage density, topography elevation, gradient, landuse and the annual rainfall data. With weighted overlay, a groundwater potential map is generated to locate possible new water sources.

=== Landslide ===
A wealth of literature has shown the use of the remote sensing techniques for landslide is successful in all recognition, monitoring and hazard assessment aspects. Besides the examples in Europe, landslides in Hong Kong brought casualties and property damage to the territory before the establishment of relevant government organization to carry out systematic studies to reduce risk of slope failure. The major contributing factors, similar to landslides all over the world, include geology, discontinuities (structural), weathering and rainfall. The intense rainfall (>2000mm/year) rapidly raises the pore pressure due to infiltration. While local hydrogeological models generated with the aid of in situ, for instance, piezometric measurements and discontinuity mapping, could help elucidate the kinematics of landslides, employing remote sensing for landslide evaluation in Hong Kong is never short of experience. For instance, Interferometric synthetic-aperture radar and aerial photo interpretation is the tool used in history for detecting surface deformation and updating landslide inventory respectively. GIS is also used to overlay layers of terrain (elevation and slope angle), lithology with rainfall data to generate landslide hazard maps. With the different weightings in respective parameters, the hazard could be zoned to get the risk controlled.

=== Urban environmental applications ===
Remote sensing has much potential in environmental applications. To name a few, the land use planning (for instance nuclear power plant location & dumping sites), monitoring of soil erosion and atmospheric pollution, vegetation etc. have been in great interest in the recent decade.
