= List of CubeSats =

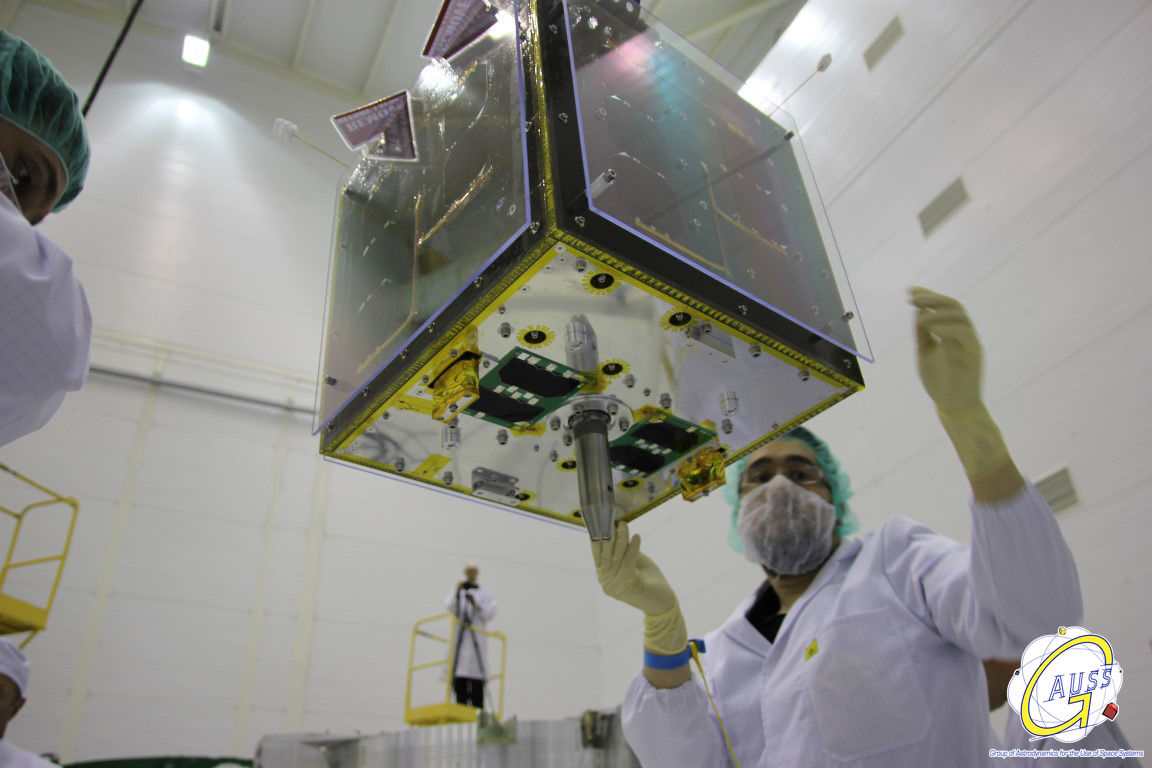

The following is a list of CubeSats, nanosatellites used primarily by universities for research missions, typically in low Earth orbits. Some CubeSats became their country's first national satellite. The extensive Nanosatellite and CubeSat Database lists over 6,000 CubeSats and NanoSats that have been launched since 1998, and forecasted 1900 nanosats to be launched between 2024-2029.

== Research and development ==
- SBUDNIC was launched to test Arduino Nano and other commercial off-the-shelf technology in space, using a simple, open-source design.
- An ambitious project is the QB50, an international network of 50 CubeSats for multi-point by different universities and other teams, in-situ measurements in the lower thermosphere (90–350 km) and re-entry research. QB50 is an initiative of the von Karman Institute and is funded by the European Union. Double-unit ("2-U") CubeSats (10x10x20 cm) are foreseen, with one unit (the 'functional' unit) providing the usual satellite functions and the other unit (the 'science' unit) accommodating a set of standardized sensors for lower thermosphere and re-entry research. 35 CubeSats are envisaged to be provided by universities in 19 European countries, 10 by universities in the US, 2 by universities in Canada, 3 by Japanese universities, 1 by an institute in Brazil, and others. Ten double or triple CubeSats are foreseen to serve for in-orbit technology demonstration of new space technologies. All 50 CubeSats may be launched together on a single Cyclone-4 launch vehicle in February 2016. The Request for Proposals (RFP) for the QB50 CubeSat was released on February 15, 2012.
- AAU CubeSat, by Aalborg University: The Danish students in this project, beginning in the summer of 2001, designed a satellite that would evaluate the technology and demonstrate the capabilities of the CubeSat concept. In order to successfully show the technology to the public, the team installed a camera on board the spacecraft, and outfitted it with a magnetically based attitude control system. But upon reaching orbit, the radio signals were weaker than expected and the batteries failed after only one month of semi-operational activity.
- AAUSAT3 is the third student-built CubeSat from Aalborg University in Denmark. The primary payload is an automatic identification system (AIS) receiver which primary task is to receive AIS data from ships around Greenland. Launched 25 February 2013 on the Indian PSLV C20. AAUSAT3 is the very first student satellite operating AIS receivers and the first demonstration of the AAU developed CSP communication protocol - internally on CANBUS on spacelink at UHF (FSK, 9600/19200). The mission has been successful.
- PW-Sat, by Warsaw University of Technology: This experiment revolves around CubeSats themselves. The test will involve developing a method to deorbit CubeSats by engaging an atmospheric drag device. The mission's focus will be the testing of this foil device; its deployment to intentionally bring the satellite back into the thicker portion of Earth's atmosphere to bring the mission to an end. The satellite is Poland's first. The satellite was delivered to orbit on the maiden flight of the European Space Agency's new launch vehicle in 2012.
- OUFTI-1, by the University of Liège and I.S.I.L (Haute École de la Province de Liège): This is a 1-unit CubeSat that is being built by Belgian students. The name is an acronym for Orbital Utility For Telecommunication Innovation. This Belgian satellite was planned to launch on the maiden flight of Vega. The goal of the project is to develop experience in the different aspects of satellite design and operation. In the communications portion of the device, the academic team will be experimenting with the D-STAR digital voice mode and communications protocol that is popular with amateur radio operators. The satellite has a mass of just 1 kilogram and will utilize a UHF uplink and a VHF downlink.
- CubeSat TestBed 1, by Boeing: Boeing successfully completed all of its design and operational goals with its first nanosatellite. It was built and flown to explore the possibilities with the new CubeSat standard. Boeing satellites are usually much larger; a Boeing 601 or 702 satellite has 1,000 times the mass of their 1 kilogram CubeSat.
- InnoSAT, by Astronautic Technology Sdn Bhd: This CubeSat will test attitude control and navigation technologies developed by five Malaysian universities.
- XSAS, by University of Michigan: This project, based on graduate research, will house an accordion folded solar array inside a 1U CubeSat. The array will extend into a long solar panel once in orbit, thereby increasing by many times the power available to an attached CubeSat.
- Clyde Space is a company that started development of subsystems for CubeSats in 2005, including electrical power systems, attitude control systems, and pulsed-plasma thruster propulsion systems. In 2010 the UK Space Agency awarded Clyde Space the UK's first CubeSat mission, UKube-1, and a 3U CubeSat was launched in July 2014.
- Aerojet began developing a propulsion system for CubeSats in 2011 that occupies a 1U baseline volume and readily integrates with other CubeSat platforms to create modular, fully mobile CubeSats. Dubbed "CHAMPS", this system utilizes chemical propulsion and offers significantly more total impulse compared to cold gas propulsion systems.
- Alta SpA develops electric and chemical propulsion systems suited for satellites of various size. A critical analysis of different electric propulsion systems was carried out by the company in 2011. The IL-FEEP thruster, a field emission, linear slit propulsion system based on the FEEP heritage, is specially suited for CubeSats and is provided in a compact, 1U version for use on 2U or 3U missions.
- The Vermont Lunar CubeSat launched by Vermont Technical College (now Vermont State University Randolph) and funded in part by a grant from Vermont Space Grant Consortium and NASA.
- e-st@r (Educational Satellite @ Polytechnic University of Turin) is a miniaturized satellite built by the Polytechnic University of Turin. It was launched into low Earth orbit on the maiden flight of Arianespace's Vega rocket on the 13th Feb 2012. It is a 1-U CubeSat design weighing 1 kg. The launch was a multi-payload mission shared with LARES, ALMASat-1, Goliat, MaSat-1, PW-Sat, ROBUSTA, UniCubeSat-GG and Xatcobeo.
- The Damping And Vibration Experiment (DAVE, or CP-7), a 1U CubeSat developed by PolySat at California Polytechnic State University, launched in 2018 to test the response of various beams damped in tungsten particles in an orbital environment. The goal of the mission is to test a system that could be used to remove adverse vibrations on future spacecraft with sensitive instruments.
- OPS-SAT was an experimental 3U (7 kg) CubeSat built by TU Graz for ESA. Launched on 18 Dec. 2019 on Soyuz VS23 as tertiary payload together with two other CubeSats, it was "the world's first free-for-use, in-orbit testbed for new software, applications and techniques in satellite control." It de-orbited on 23 May 2024.

== Earth remote sensing ==
- QuakeSat, by Quakefinder: This satellite was set out on a mission to help scientists improve earthquake detection. The students are hoping that the detection of magnetic signals may have value in showing the onset of an earthquake. The company that put the satellites together is from Palo Alto, California. They're gathering data on the extremely low magnetic field fluctuations that are associated with earthquakes to help better understand this area of study that has its skeptics. The 30 June 2003 deployment of Quakesat was alongside other university CubeSats and one commercial CubeSat. The launch occurred on a Rockot rocket from Russia's Plesetsk launch site.
- SwissCube, by École Polytechnique Fédérale de Lausanne: This project has been selected to fly aboard a new expendable launch system being developed for Arianespace jointly by the Italian Space Agency and the European Space Agency. The rocket is called Vega, and takes its name from the star. The Swiss students will conduct experiments with the air glow phenomenon in the Earth's atmosphere. The satellite's downlink radio will transmit at 437 MHz; the uplink will be at 145 MHz.
- PLUME, by the University of Leicester: They plan to launch a CubeSat that will detect cosmic dust, and will be the first English CubeSat to be launched. The students began their project at the beginning of 2007 and if successful will have a method for scientists to look at the smallest ever dust particles from space.
- Firefly, by NASA's Goddard Space Flight Center and Siena College: Terrestrial gamma-ray flashes have been detected from the Compton Gamma Ray Observatory after its launch in 1991. Scientists have theories about their origins and this new CubeSat will have instruments that will observe both photons and electrons simultaneously. This, in turn, will allow scientists to better determine if lightning is the source of the gamma-ray bursts.
- ELFIN (Electron Losses and Fields INvestigation) is a 3U CubeSat developed by the University of California, Los Angeles and launched on September 18, 2018. ELFIN studied electron losses in the magnetosphere using a fluxgate magnetometer and two energetic particle detectors (one for ions and one for electrons. ELFIN is a participant in the 8th iteration of the University Nanosatellite Program.
- ExoCube (CP-10) is a space-weather satellite by PolySat. It measures the in-situ densities of various elements in the Earth's exosphere over incoherent scatter radar.
- ONGLAISAT by ArkRidge Space, Earth observation satellite, launched December 2024.

== Space tether ==
- MAST, by Tethers Unlimited: The Multi-Application Survivable Tether experiment, based in the United States, was launched 17 April 2007 aboard a Dnepr rocket. This 1 km multistrand, interconnected tether (Hoytether) is being used to test and prove the long-term survivability for tethers in space. The three MAST pico-satellites ejected from the P-POD successfully, but the communications system had difficulties, and the separation mechanism did not function properly, preventing full deployment of the tether. Nonetheless, the experiment operated for over a month and downloaded over 2 MB of data on tethered satellite dynamics as well as images of the tether. While Stanford University formed the academic portion of the team, Tethers Unlimited, from Seattle, Washington, formed the commercial portion of the team.
- STARS (Kukai), by the Kagawa Satellite Development Project at Kagawa University, Japan: The Space Tethered Autonomous Robotic Satellite (STARS) mission launched 23 January 2009 as a secondary payload on a H-IIA launch. After launch, the satellite was named KUKAI, and consisted of two subsatellites, "Ku" and "Kai," to be linked by a 5-meter tether. It was successfully separated from the rocket and transferred into the planned orbit. See also STARS-II microsatellite follow-up with longer (300m) tether.
- Tempo3, by The Mars Society: This operation is called the Tethered Experiment for Mars inter-Planetary Operations and is meant to demonstrate the generation of artificial gravity. The project seeks to enhance knowledge about long term space flight.

== Biology ==
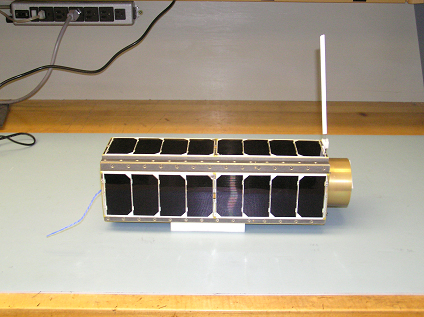
NASA's GeneSat 1

- GeneSat 1, by the NASA Ames Research Center: In December 2006, a Minotaur launch vehicle carried this satellite into orbit from NASA's Wallops Flight Facility to carry out a genetics experiment. The team assembled the biological growth and analysis systems to perform experiments with E. coli bacteria. The project is not cheap by CubeSat standards: the total spent on the satellite and its experiments were $6 million before the launch took place. The goal is to establish methods for studying the genetic changes that come from being exposed to a space environment. The satellite was outfitted with a UHF beacon.

== Other uses ==
- Cubesat ROBUSTA, by Montpellier 2 University: A mission to test the effects of radiation on electronics. The goal is to specifically check the deterioration of electronic components based on bipolar transistors when exposed to the space radiation environment. The results of this experiment will be used to validate a test method proposed in the laboratory. The French satellite launched on the maiden flight of Vega in early 2012.
- TJ^{3}Sat, by Thomas Jefferson High School for Science and Technology, Alexandria, Virginia, which was the first CubeSat ever launched by high school students on November 19, 2013.
- iCube-1, by Institute of Space Technology, was Pakistan's first CubeSat. It was manufactured by a team of about 20 faculty members and 15 students. It was launched on 21 November 2013 on board the Dnepr space launch vehicle.
- CINEMA, a collaborative effort between the University of California, Berkeley Space Sciences Laboratory, Imperial College London, School of Space Research of Kyung Hee University, and the Interamerican University of Puerto Rico: The project's goal is to develop a cubesat that monitors space weather using a combination of magnetometers and particle detectors.
- A CubeSat Inflatable Deorbit Device, by Old Dominion University: This study describes a deployable aerodynamic drag device that can be incorporated in basic 1U CubeSat units that can meet the 25-year orbital lifetime constraint for initial orbit perigees of up to 900 km.
- The NEE-01 Pegaso launched by the Ecuadorian Space Agency in early 2013 was the first known cubesat able to transmit real time video from orbit and broadcast the live feed over the internet.
- SpaceICE ("Interface Convective Effects") is a 3U CubeSat developed by The University of Illinois Urbana-Champaign and Northwestern University to study freeze-casting (a directional solidification technique for the production of porous materials). The SpaceICE mission is scheduled to launch late 2018.

== List of launched CubeSats ==
There are many types of CubeSats ranging from 0.25u to 16u. In the Type column, the number corresponds to the (approximate) length of the CubeSat in decimetres. Width and depth are normally ten centimetres, or one decimetre. A 1U CubeSat measures approximately 1 × 1 × 1 decimetres, while a 6U CubeSat is six times the size, approximately 1 × 2 × 3 decimetres.

This list can be sorted by clicking on the heading of any column.

Name	COSPAR ID (NORAD ID)	Type	Organisation	Mission	Mission status	Launch date (UTC)	Launch vehicle	Reentry date	Remarks
AAU CubeSat	2003-031G (27846)	1U	Aalborg University	Technology	Completed	30 Jun 2003	Rokot / Briz-KM		Battery problems, deactivated on 22 September 2003
CanX-1	2003-031H (27847)	1U	UTIAS	Technology demonstration	Failed	30 Jun 2003	Rokot / Briz-KM		No signal from spacecraft
Cubesat Xi-IV (Oscar 57)	2003-031J (27848)	1U	University of Tokyo	Amateur radio	Active	30 Jun 2003	Rokot / Briz-KM		Still sending housekeeping information as of Sep 2023
CUTE-I (Oscar 55)	2003-031E (27844)	1U	Tokyo Institute of Technology	Amateur radio	Active	30 Jun 2003	Rokot / Briz-KM		
SNAPPY	(69014)	3U	Wichita State University, Kansas, USA	A Solar Neutrino technology demonstrator.	Operating	3 May 2026	Falcon-9 from VSFB as part of COS500-2 launch as a rideshare		First communications July 24, 2026 and daily Data download started Aug. 4, 2026
DTUsat	2003-031C (27842)	1U	Technical University of Denmark	Tether research	Failed	30 Jun 2003	Rokot / Briz-KM		No signal from spacecraft
QuakeSat	2003-031F (27845)	3U	Stanford University	Earthquake detection	Active	30 Jun 2003	Rokot / Briz-KM		
TUSat1		2U	Taylor University	Space Communication Research	Not launched. Canceled?	30 Jun 2003	Rokot/Briz-KM		First satellite from Indiana
CubeSat Xi-V (Oscar-58)	2005-043F (28895)	1U	University of Tokyo	Amateur radio	Completed	27 Oct 2005	Kosmos-3M		Still sending housekeeping information as of Sep 2023
nCube-2	2005-043H (28897)	1U	ARR/NSC	Amateur radio	Failed	27 Oct 2005	Kosmos-3M		No signal
UWE-1	2005-043C (28892)	1U	University of Würzburg	Technology / Communications	Completed	27 Oct 2005	Kosmos-3M		Contact lost on 17 November 2005
SACRED	Failed to Orbit	1U	University of Arizona		Destroyed. Launch failure	26 Jul 2006	Dnepr		
ION	Failed to Orbit	2U	University of Illinois		Destroyed. Launch failure	26 Jul 2006	Dnepr		
Rincon 1		1U	University of Arizona		Destroyed. Launch failure	26 Jul 2006	Dnepr		
ICE Cube 1		1U	Cornell University		Destroyed. Launch failure	26 Jul 2006	Dnepr		
KUTESat		1U	University of Kansas		Destroyed. Launch failure	26 Jul 2006	Dnepr		
nCUBE-1		1U	ARR / NSC		Destroyed. Launch failure	26 Jul 2006	Dnepr		
HAUSAT-1		1U	Hankuk Aviation University		Destroyed. Launch failure	26 Jul 2006	Dnepr		
SEEDS-1		1U	Nihon University		Destroyed. Launch failure	26 Jul 2006	Dnepr		
CP-2		1U	California Polytechnic University		Destroyed. Launch failure	26 Jul 2006	Dnepr		
AeroCube-1		1U	The Aerospace Corporation	Technology demonstration	Destroyed. Launch failure	26 Jul 2006	Dnepr		
MEROPE		1U	Montana State University		Destroyed. Launch failure	26 Jul 2006	Dnepr		
Mea Huaka'i (Voyager)		1U	University of Hawaiʻi		Destroyed. Launch failure	26 Jul 2006	Dnepr		
ICE Cube 2		1U	Cornell University		Destroyed. Launch failure	26 Jul 2006	Dnepr		
CP-1		1U	California Polytechnic University		Destroyed. Launch failure	26 Jul 2006	Dnepr		
GeneSat-1	2006-058C (29655)	3U	NASA / Santa Clara University	Biological research Technology demonstration	Completed	16 Dec 2006	Minotaur	4 Aug 2010	Primary mission complete
CSTB1	2007-012F (31122)	1U	Boeing		Active	17 Apr 2007	Dnepr		
AeroCube-2	2007-012R (31133)	1U	The Aerospace Corporation	Technology demonstration	Failed	17 Apr 2007	Dnepr		Solar converter malfunction on 18 Apr 2007
CP-4	2007-012Q (31132)	1U	California Polytechnic University		Active	17 Apr 2007	Dnepr		
Libertad-1	2007-012M (31128)	1U	Sergio Arboleda University		Successful	17 Apr 2007	Dnepr		Designed to only operate for 50 days. However continued for over 2 years.
CAPE-1	NASA.gov 2007-012P (31130)	1U	University of Louisiana at Lafayette		Active	17 Apr 2007	Dnepr		
CP-3	2007-012N (31129)	1U	California Polytechnic University		Active	17 Apr 2007	Dnepr		
MAST	2007-012K (31126)	1U	Tethers Unlimited	Tether experiments		17 Apr 2007	Dnepr		Failed to deploy, but radio contact made
Cute-1.7 + APD II	2008-021C (32785)	2U	Tokyo Institute of Technology	Separation system demonstration and Avalanche Photo Diode sensor experiment	Active	28 Apr 2008	PSLV-CA		
COMPASS-1	2008-021E (32787)	1U	FH Aachen	Demonstration of commercial off-the-shelf components and taking photos	Active	28 Apr 2008	PSLV-CA		
AAUSat-2	2008-021F (32788)	1U	Aalborg University, Denmark	ADCS system and a gamma ray detector	Completed	28 Apr 2008	PSLV-CA		
Delfi-C^{3}	2008-021G (32789)	3U	Delft University of Technology, The Netherlands		Completed	28 Apr 2008	PSLV-CA	Dec 2023	
CanX-2	2008-021H (32790)	3U	University of Toronto, Canada	Technology demonstrator for formation flying	Active	28 Apr 2008	PSLV-CA		
SEEDS-2	2008-021J (32791)	1U	Nihon University, Japan	Amateur radio experiments and preprogrammed message sending	Active	28 Apr 2008	PSLV-CA		
PREsat		3U	NASA	Technology	Destroyed	3 Aug 2008	Falcon 1		Launch failure
NanoSail-D		3U	NASA	Technology	Destroyed	3 Aug 2008	Falcon 1		Launch failure
STARS		2U	Kagawa University	Short-distance tether extension	Active	23 Jan 2009	H-IIA		basic functions of tether reel confirmed
PharmaSat	2009-028B (35002)	3U	NASA Ames Research Center, Santa Clara University, University of Texas Medical Branch	Measured the effect of antifungal countermeasures on yeast strains in microgravity. ≈96 hour experiment.	Completed	19 May 2009	Minotaur I	14 August 2012	
CP6	2009-028C (35003)	1U	California Polytechnic State University, San Luis Obispo	Technology demonstration	Completed	19 May 2009	Minotaur I	6 October 2011	
HawkSat-1	2009-028D (35004)	1U	Hawk Institute for Space Sciences	Technology demonstration	Completed	19 May 2009	Minotaur I	4 September 2011	
AeroCube-3	2009-028E (35005)	1U	The Aerospace Corporation	Technology demonstration	Completed	19 May 2009	Minotaur I	6 January 2011	
SwissCube-1	2009-051B (35932)	1U	Ecole Polytechnique Fédérale de Lausanne	Upper atmospheric science	Active	23 Sep 2009	PSLV-CA		First Swiss satellite. Still sending telemetry
BeeSat-1	2009-051C (35933)	1U	Technische Universität Berlin	Reaction wheel technology qualification	Active	23 Sep 2009	PSLV-CA		
UWE-2	2009-051D (35934)	1U	Universität Würzburg	ADCS technology demonstrator	Active	23 Sep 2009	PSLV-CA		
ITUpSAT1	2009-051E (35935)	1U	Istanbul Technical University	Imagery, technology	Active	23 Sep 2009	PSLV-CA		
Hayato	2010-020A (36573)	1U	Kagoshima University	Observe atmospheric vapor distribution, Shooting moving images of Earth through microwave high-speed communications	Failed	20 May 2010	H-IIA 202	28 Jun 2010	
Waseda-SAT2	2010-020B (36574)	1U	Waseda University		Failed.	20 May 2010	H-IIA 202	12 Jul 2010	
Negai-Star	2010-020C (36575)	1U	Soka University	Commercial FPGA and camera	Successful. mission complete.	20 May 2010	H-IIA 202	26 Jun 2010	
TIsat-1	2010-035E (36799)	1U	University of Applied Sciences of Southern Switzerland (SUPSI)	Technology demonstrator	Semi-operational.	12 Jul 2010	PSLV-CA		All UAS-made Swiss student satellite; partnering with local and global companies
StudSat	2010-035B (36796)	1U	StudSat		Mission Ended	12 Jul 2010	PSLV-CA		First Indian picosatellite. Beacon heard for about 1 month.
RAX-1	2010-062B (37223)	3U	University of Michigan	Ionospheric research	Premature End	20 Nov 2010	Minotaur 4 (STP-S26)		anomaly on the solar panels resulted in degradation of power generation
O/OREOS	2010-062C (37224)	3U	NASA SMD	Life sciences		20 Nov 2010	Minotaur 4 (STP-S26)		
NanoSail-D2	2010-062L (37361)	3U	NASA Ames Research Center	Technology	Completed	20 Nov 2010	Minotaur 4 (STP-S26)	17 Sep 2011	failed to eject 6 Dec 2010; spontaneously ejected 19 Jan 2011 to complete mission
Perseus 000	2010-066H (37251)	1.5U	Los Alamos National Laboratory	Developing a rapid-response satellite capability to enable many different mission types	Completed	8 Dec 2010	Falcon 9	30 Dec 2010	
Perseus 001	2010-066E (37248)	1.5U	Los Alamos National Laboratory	Developing a rapid-response satellite capability to enable many different mission types	Completed	8 Dec 2010	Falcon 9	31 Dec 2010	
Perseus 002	2010-066G (37250)	1.5U	Los Alamos National Laboratory	Developing a rapid-response satellite capability to enable many different mission types	Completed	8 Dec 2010	Falcon 9	30 Dec 2010	
Perseus 003	2010-066D (37247)	1.5U	Los Alamos National Laboratory	Developing a rapid-response satellite capability to enable many different mission types	Completed	8 Dec 2010	Falcon 9	31 Dec 2010	
QbX1	2010-066F (37249)	3U	NRL	Technology demonstration	Successful	8 Dec 2010	Falcon 9	6 Jan 2011	
QbX2	2010-066B (37245)	3U	NRL	Technology demonstration	Successful	8 Dec 2010	Falcon 9	16 Jan 2011	
SMDC-ONE	2010-066C (37246)	3U	US Army SMDC	Communications	Completed	8 Dec 2010	Falcon 9	12 Jan 2011	
Mayflower-Caerus	2010-066J (37252)	3U	Northrop Grumman (Mayflower); University of Southern California (Caerus)	Technology	Completed	8 Dec 2010	Falcon 9	22 Dec 2010	
KySat-1	Failed to orbit	1U	Kentucky Space	Educational, technology testing, amateur radio	Destroyed. Launch failure	04 Mar 2011	Taurus-XL via ELaNa-1		
Hermes	Failed to orbit	1U	University of Colorado Boulder		Destroyed. Launch failure	04 Mar 2011	Taurus-XL		
Explorer-1 [Prime]	Failed to orbit	1U	Montana State University		Destroyed. Launch failure	04 Mar 2011	Taurus-XL		
Jugnu	2011-058B (37839)	3U	IIT Kanpur	Micro-imaging system, near infrared camera to observe vegetation, GPS Receiver to aid tracking	Active	12 Oct 2011	PSLV-CA		
M-Cubed	2011-061F (37855)	1U	University of Michigan	Imaging technology		28 Oct 2011	Delta II via ELaNa-3		M-cubed and Explorer-1 Prime Unit 2 (HRBE) were magnetically attached to one another. Speculation is that this is due to the permanent magnets each have for passive attitude control. M-cubed remains alive and transmitting.
DICE-1	2011-061B (37851)	1.5U	Space Dynamics Laboratory	Ionospheric research	Active	28 Oct 2011	Delta II via ELaNa-3		
DICE-2	2011-061C (37852)	1.5U	Space Dynamics Laboratory	Ionospheric research	Active	28 Oct 2011	Delta II via ELaNa-3		
Explorer-1 [Prime] Unit 2	2011-061F (37855)	1U	Montana Space Grant Consortium	Magnetospheric Research	Active	28 Oct 2011	Delta II via ELaNa-3		M-cubed and Explorer-1 Prime Unit 2 (HRBE) were magnetically attached to one another. Speculation is that this is due to the permanent magnets each have for passive attitude control. HRBE did not suffer from this connection with M-cubed.
RAX-2	2011-061D (37853)	3U	University of Michigan	Ionospheric research	Active	28 Oct 2011	Delta II via ELaNa-3		
AubieSat-1	2011-061E (37854)	1U	Auburn University	Technology	Active	28 Oct 2011	Delta II via ELaNa-3		First CubeSat from Auburn University
ROBUSTA	2012-006H (38084)	1U	Université Montpellier 2	Radiation effects on bipolar-transistor-based circuits	Failed	13 Feb 2012	Vega	Feb 2014	First French CubeSat
e-st@r	2012-006C (38079)	1U	Politecnico di Torino	Development and test of an active ADCS; Test of COTS	Tumbling	13 Feb 2012	Vega		
MaSat-1	2012-006E (38081)	1U	BME	Technological demonstration	Active	13 Feb 2012	Vega		First Hungarian satellite
Xatcobeo	2012-006F (38082)	1U	University of Vigo	Test software-defined radio and to experiment with solar panel deployment.	Active	13 Feb 2012	Vega		Maiden flight of Vega.
Goliat	2012-006D (38080)	1U	University of Bucharest Romania	Earth imaging and space environment measuring		13 Feb 2012	Vega		First Romanian satellite
PW-Sat	2012-006G (38083)	1U	Warsaw University of Technology Poland	Technology experiments		13 Feb 2012	Vega		First Polish satellite
UniCubeSat-GG	2012-006J (38085)	1U	GAUSS team-Sapienza University of Rome, Italy	Deployable powered boom for gravity gradient libration study		13 Feb 2012	Vega		First Italian CubeSat (together with e-st@r)
F-1	2012-038E (38855)	1U	FPT University	Training for students and young engineers / Education. Test of 3-axis SDTM magnetometer	Failed; No signal received	21 Jul 2012	H-IIB to ISS	9 May 2013	First Vietnamese satellite developed domestically. Deployed from ISS 2012 Oct 4.
TechEdSat-1	2012-038D (38854)	1U	San Jose State University	SPA hardware and software, inter-satellite communication link analysis		21 Jul 2012	H-IIB to ISS	5 May 2013	Deployed from ISS 2012 Oct 4.
Raiko	2012-038B (38852)	2U	Tohoku University / Wakayama University	Ku-band communication, prototype star tracker and deployable membrane technology demonstration	Successful	21 Jul 2012	H-IIB to ISS	6 Aug 2013	Deployed from ISS 2012 Oct 4
We-Wish	2012-038F (38856)	1U	Meisei Electric	Infrared camera imaging	Failed, no signal received	21 Jul 2012	H-IIB to ISS	11 Mar 2013	Deployed from ISS 2012 Oct 4
CSSWE	2012-048D (38761)	3U	University of Colorado Boulder / LASP	Space weather research	Complete	13 Sep 2012	Atlas V 401 NROL-36 via ELaNa-VI	Expected 2028	Extended Mission Complete
VELOX-P1		1U	Satellite Research Center, Nanyang Technological University	Undergraduate Satellite Program. Technology demonstration for in house development of the sensors.		1 Oct 2012	Confidential (Neptune)		
FITSAT-1 (NIWAKA)	2012-038C (38853)	1U	Fukuoka Institute of Technology	The main mission objective is to demonstrate the developed high-speed transmitter.	Active	4 Oct 2012	H-IIB to ISS	4 Jul 2013	Deployed from ISS 2012 Oct 4.
AAUSAT3	2013-009B (39087)	1U	Aalborg University, Denmark	Double AIS system for tracking ships in Arctic regions.	Active	25 Feb 2013	PSLV-CA C20		Denmark's CubeSat number 4
STRaND-1	2013-009E (39090)	3U	Surrey Space Centre (SSC), University of Surrey, & Surrey Satellite Technology Ltd (SSTL)	Technology	Operational	25 Feb 2013	PSLV-CA C20		First in STRaND Programme
BeeSat-2	2013-015G (39136)	1U	Technische Universität Berlin	Reaction wheel technology qualification	Active	19 Apr 2013	Soyuz		
BeeSat-3	2013-015E (39134)	1U	Technische Universität Berlin	Reaction wheel technology qualification	Active	19 Apr 2013	Soyuz		
SOMP	2013-015F (39135)	1U	Dresden University of Technology, Germany	Education, testing software-defined radio, measuring atomic oxygen concentration, demonstrating TFSC		19 Apr 2013	Soyuz		
Dove-2	2013-015C (39132)	3U	Planet Labs	Optical imaging	Active	19 Apr 2013	Soyuz-2.1a		
OSSI-1	2013-015B (39131)	1U		Amateur radio	Complete	19 Apr 2013	Soyuz-2.1a	30 Jun 2013	Privately built and part of the Bion-M No.1 mission
PhoneSat 1.0 (Graham)	2013-016E (39146)	1U	NASA Ames Research Center	Technology; using unmodified consumer-grade off-the-shelf smartphones		21 Apr 2013	Antares 110 A-ONE	26 Apr 2013	First PhoneSat Launch
PhoneSat 1.0 (Bell)	2013-016A (39142)	1U	NASA Ames Research Center	ongoing NASA project, part of the Small Spacecraft Technology Program, of building nanosatellites using unmodified consumer-grade off-the-shelf smartphones		21 Apr 2013	Antares 110 A-ONE	27 Apr 2013	First PhoneSat Launch
PhoneSat 2.0.beta (Alexander)	2013-016C (39144)	1U	NASA Ames Research Center	ongoing NASA project, part of the Small Spacecraft Technology Program, of building nanosatellites using unmodified consumer-grade off-the-shelf smartphones		21 Apr 2013	Antares 110 A-ONE	27 Apr 2013	First PhoneSat Launch
NEE-01 Pegasus	NASA.gov 2013-018B] (39151)	1U	Ecuadorian Space Agency	Technology	Active	26 Apr 2013	Long March 2D		First Ecuadorian satellite, first CubeSat to transmit real-time video
TurkSat-3USat	2013-018C (39152)	3U	Istanbul Technical University	Communications	Active	26 Apr 2013	Long March 2D		
ESTCube-1	2013-021C (39161)	1U	University of Tartu	Space test of the electric solar wind sail	Inactive since 17 February 2015. Partial failure.	7 May 2013	Vega		First Estonian satellite
ArduSat1	1998-067DA (39412)	1U	Nanosatisfi LLC	Allow general public to use the satellite sensors for their own creative purposes.		3 Aug 2013	H-IIB to ISS	16 Apr 2014	Deployed from ISS 2013 Nov 19.
ArduSatX	1998-067DC (39414)	1U	Nanosatisfi LLC	Allow general public to use the satellite sensors for their own creative purposes.		3 Aug 2013	H-IIB to ISS	15 Apr 2014	Deployed from ISS 2013 Nov 19.
Firefly	2013-064AA (39404)	3U	Taylor University	Space Communication Research	Operational	20 Nov 2013	Minotaur I		
ChargerSat-1	2013-064AB (39405)	1U	University of Alabama in Huntsville	Technological demonstration	Launched. No contact established. Maximum time before passive return and destruction: 24 months	20 Nov 2013	Minotaur I via ELaNa-IV		Built by the UAH Space Hardware Club.
Vermont Lunar	2013-064AD (39407)	1U	Vermont Technical College	Testing navigation components to be used in a follow-up 3U ion drive CubeSat to the Moon	Active	20 Nov 2013	Minotaur I via ELaNa-IV		First university satellite from New England. Built by the Vermont Tech CubeSat Lab.
iCUBE-1	2013-066S (39432)	1U	Institute of Space Technology Islamabad Pakistan	Small satellite designed by the students	Active	21 Nov 2013	Dnepr		First Pakistani CubeSat.
FUNcube-1	2013-066AE (39444)	1U	AMSAT-UK / National Radio Centre	Primary/ secondary education (UK)	Active	21 Nov 2013	Dnepr		
Delfi-n3Xt	2013-066N (39428)	3U	Delft University of Technology, The Netherlands	Technology	Active	21 Nov 2013	Dnepr		www.delfispace.nl
ZACUBE-1 (TshepisoSat)	2013-066B (39417)	1U	French South African Institute of Technology at the Cape Peninsula University of Technology	Space weather, technology demonstration, education and human capital development.	Active	21 Nov 2013	Dnepr		Student-built satellite. First South African CubeSat
NEE-02 Krysaor	2013-066AB (39441)	1U	Ecuadorian Space Agency	Technological demonstration / Education Orbital debris and small asteroids monitoring		21 Nov 2013	Dnepr		Will be the second Ecuadorian satellite in constellation with NEE-01; Build and testing completed on 15 July 2012
PUCPSAT-1	2013-066AC (39442)	1U	Pontificia Universidad Católica del Perú	Technology demonstration		21 Nov 2013	Dnepr/GAUSS Srl deployer		
VELOX-P2	2013-066Y (39438)	1U	Satellite Research Center, Nanyang Technological University	Undergraduate Satellite Program. Technology demonstration for in house development of the sensors.		21 Nov 2013	Dnepr		
ArduSat2	1998-067EQ (39571)	2U	Nanosatisfi LLC	Allow general public to use the satellite sensors for their own creative purposes.		9 Jan 2014	Cygnus CRS Orb-1 to ISS	1 Jul 2014	Deployed from ISS 2014 Feb 28.
CHASQUI - I		1U	UNI	Technology demonstration	Unknown	9 Jan 2014	Cygnus CRS Orb-1 to ISS		Peruvian. Deployed from ISS 17 Aug 2014
SkyCube	1998-067EL (39567)	1U	Southern Stars LLC	Crowdfunding, messaging, imaging, balloon inflation	Partial failure, satellite reentered	9 Jan 2014	Cygnus CRS Orb-1 to ISS		First crowdfunded satellite with inflatable balloon; Deployed from ISS 2014 Feb 28.
UAPSat-1	1998-067EM (39568)	1U	University Alas Peruanas	Technology demonstration		9 Jan 2014	Antares 110 Cygnus CRS Orb-1 to ISS	22 May 2014	Deployed from ISS 2014 Feb 28.
OPUSAT	2014-009D (39575)	1U	Osaka Prefecture University	Test Lithium-ion capacitor technology in space		27 Feb 2014	H-IIA 202	24 Jul 2014	
ITF-1 (Yui)	2014-009B (39573)	1U	Tsukuba University	amateur radio		27 Feb 2014	H-IIA 202	29 Jun 2014	
INVADER (Artsat-1)	2014-009F (39577)	1U	Tama Art University	art, voice broadcast		27 Feb 2014	H-IIA 202		
KSAT2 (Hayato-2)	2014-009G (39578)	1U	Kagoshima University	climatology satellite with RF water vapor sensor for improved prediction of rain and tornado		27 Feb 2014	H-IIA 202	18 May 2014	
KickSat		3U		Technology demonstration	Failed	18 Apr 2014	Falcon-9	14 May 2014	Launched with SpaceX CRS-3 and deployed from the ISS
TSat4	2014-022C (39682)		Taylor University	Low Earth Orbit Plasma Research		18 Apr 2014	Falcon 9 via ELaNa-V	28 May 2014	
AeroCube-6		1U	Aerospace Corporation	Radiation studies in LEO		19 Jun 2014	Dnepr		
UniSat 6	2014-033C	In-orbit CubeSat launcher	GAUSS	Deployed TigriSat, Lemur 1, ANTELSAT and AeroCube 6		19 Jun 2014	Dnepr		
Perseus-M1 / Perseus-M2	2014-033AF (40039) / 2014-033AD (40037)	6U	Canopus Systems US (Operated by Aquila Space, Inc.)	6U Cubesat Bus Demonstration and AIS ship tracking payload	Active	19 Jun 2014	Dnepr		
LEMUR-1		3U	Nanosatisfi			19 Jun 2014	Dnepr		
Antelsat	2014-033AA (40034)	2U	FING-IIE (Facultad de Ingeniería de la Universidad de la República, Instituto de Ingeniería Eléctrica), Antel (Administración Nacional de Telecomunicaciones)	Technology	Active	19 Jun 2014	Dnepr		First Uruguayan satellite.
Flock-1c x 11		3U	Planet Labs, US	Optical imaging	Active	19 Jun 2014	Dnepr		
NanoSatC-Br 1		1U	UFSM, INPE, Brazil	Magnetosphere research	Active	19 Jun 2014	Dnepr		
POPSAT-HIP 1		3U	Microspace Rapid	Technology (demonstrate the functionality of a high resolution optical payload and attitude control propulsion system)	Active	19 Jun 2014	Dnepr		
QB50P1, QB50P2		2U	Von Karman Institute, Belgium	Thermosphere research (Ion and Neutral Mass Spectrometers)	Active	19 Jun 2014	Dnepr		Pair of the first Belgium satellites; first cubesats under QB50 program
VELOX-1-NSAT	2014-034E (40057)	1U	Satellite Research Center, Nanyang Technological University	Undergraduate Satellite Program. Technology demonstration for in house development of the sensors.		30 Jun 2014	PSLV-CA		
VELOX-1-PSAT	2014-034E (40057)	1U	Satellite Research Center, Nanyang Technological University	Undergraduate Satellite Program. Technology demonstration for in house development of the sensors.		30 Jun 2014	PSLV-CA		
UKube-1		3U	UK Space Agency	Technology demonstration mission	Complete, but still operational, awaiting further possible use by Amsat.	8 Jul 2014	Soyuz from Baikonur		The UK Space Agency's First Satellite (though not the UK's first Ariel 1), built by Clydespace.
AESP-14	1998-067FM (40389)	1U	ITA	Ionospheric research	Failed	10 Jan 2015	Falcon-9	11 May 2015	First Brazilian nanosatellite. Launched with SpaceX CRS-5 and deployed from the ISS on 5 February 2015
ExoCube		3U	Cal Poly; PolySat	Space weather		31 Jan 2015	Delta II via ELaNa-X		
FIREBIRD-II (FIREBIRD 3 / FIREBIRD 4)	2015-003B (40377) / 2015-003C (40378)	1.5U	Montana State University; University of New Hampshire; Los Alamos National Laboratory; Aerospace Corp	Space weather		31 Jan 2015	Delta II via ELaNa-X		Focused Investigations of Relativistic Electron Burst, Intensity, Range, and Dynamics (FIREBIRD) II
GRIFEX	2015-003D	3U	University of Michigan, NASA JPL	Atmospheric studies technology		31 Jan 2015	Delta II via ELaNa-X		Geostationary Coastal and Air Pollution Events (GEO-CAPE) Read-Out Integrated Circuit (ROIC) In-Flight Performance Experiment (GRIFEX)
OptiCube 3		3U	Cal Poly, SLO	Targets for orbital debris studies	Active	20 May 2015	Atlas V		
AeroCube 8B		1.5U	Aerospace Corp.		Active	20 May 2015	Atlas V		
AeroCube 8A		1.5U	Aerospace Corp.		Active	20 May 2015	Atlas V		
OptiCube 2		3U	Cal Poly, SLO		Active	20 May 2015	Atlas V		
GEARRS-2		3U	NearSpace Launch Inc	Technology/Communications	Active	20 May 2015	Atlas V		
OptiCube 1		3U	Cal Poly, SLO		Active	20 May 2015	Atlas V		
BRICSat-P		1.5U	U.S. Naval Academy	Transponder experiment, electric propulsion technology	Active	20 May 2015	Atlas V		
ParkinsonSAT	2015-025D (40654)	1.5U	U.S. Naval Academy		Active	20 May 2015	Atlas V		
USS Langley		3U	U.S. Naval Academy		Active	20 May 2015	Atlas V		
LightSail-1		3U	The Planetary Society	Demonstrating increased orbital energy with controlled solar sailing in Earth orbit	Completed (Reentered)	20 May 2015	Atlas V via ELaNa-XI		
MinXSS	41474U	3U	University of Colorado Boulder / Laboratory for Atmospheric and Space Physics	Solar soft X-ray studies	Completed	6 Dec 2015	Atlas V	6 May 2017	ISS deployed 16 May 2016
ATHENOXAT-1		3U	Microspace Rapid	Technology (demonstrate a new high resolution night vision optical payload)	Active	16 Dec 2015	Pslv		
OUFTI-1		1U	University of Liège and I.S.I.L (Haute École de la Province de Liège, Belgium)	Testing radio protocol in space	Launched	25 Apr 2016	Soyuz-STA/Fregat		Orbital Utility For Telecommunication Innovations (OUFTI).
Swayam	41607	1U	College of Engineering, Pune	Technology demonstration	Active	22 Jun 2016	PSLV		Part of the PSLV-C34 mission
Aalto-2	1998-067MJ (42729)	2U	Aalto University, Finland	Atmospheric research	Inactive	18 Apr 2017	Atlas V		First Finnish satellite. Part of the QB50 project.
nSight-1		2U	SCS-Space		Successful	18 Apr 2017	Atlas V		Part of QB50. Designed to operate for 12–18 months. Still active after 29 months and counting.
UPSat	1998-067LX (42716)	2U	University of Patras, Libre Space Foundation	Research	Decayed	18 Apr 2017	Atlas V	13 November 2018	Part of the QB50 project. First open source hardware and software satellite to be launched. First satellite manufactured in Greece. UPSat was released in orbit by the Nanoracks deployer from the International Space Station at 08:24 UTC 2017-05-18.
ZA-AeroSat		2U	Stellenbosch University			18 Apr 2017	Atlas V		Part of QB50. Limited operations due to communication problems.
BRAC Onnesha	1998-067MX (42823)	1U	BRAC University	Technology demonstration Earth observation	Active	3 Jun 2017	Falcon-9 SpaceX CRS-11		Deployed from ISS on 7 July 2017 with the Birds-1 constellation
GhanaSat-1	1998-067MV (42821)	1U	All Nations University	Technology demonstration Earth observation	Active	3 Jun 2017	Falcon-9 SpaceX CRS-11		Deployed from ISS on 7 July 2017 with the Birds-1 constellation
Mazaalai	1998-067MW (42822)	1U	National University of Mongolia	Technology demonstration Earth observation	Active	3 Jun 2017	Falcon-9 SpaceX CRS-11		Deployed from ISS on 7 July 2017 with the Birds-1 constellation
Nigeria EduSat-1	1998-067MY (42824)	1U	Federal University of Technology Akure	Technology demonstration Earth observation	Active	3 Jun 2017	Falcon-9 SpaceX CRS-11		Deployed from ISS on 7 July 2017 with the Birds-1 constellation
TOKI	1998-067MU (42820)	1U	Kyushu Institute of Technology	Technology demonstration Earth observation	Active	3 Jun 2017	Falcon-9 SpaceX CRS-11		Deployed from ISS on 7 July 2017 with the Birds-1 constellation
Kalam SAT		Femto Satellite	NASA		Active	22 Jun 2017	Terrier Orion sounding rocket		Cubes in Space
SkCube		2U (QB50 type)	Slovak Organisation for Space Activities (SOSA), University of Žilina, Slovak University of Technology by help of Belgian Von Karman Institute, Faculty of Aeronautics of Technical University of Kosice	Research and technology demonstration	Complete	23 Jun 2017	TBD		Will be first Slovak satellite
Aalto-1	2017-036L (42775)	3U	Aalto University and Finnish Meteorological Institute, Finland	Technical demonstration of a miniaturized spectral imager, a radiation monitor and a plasma brake	Active	23 Jun 2017	PSLV-C38 from India		Second Finnish satellite
InflateSail	2017-036F (42770)	3U	von Karman Institute for Fluid Dynamics	Technology demonstration (drag sail)	Complete	23 Jun 2017	PSLV-C38		
LituanicaSAT-2	2017-036D (42768)	3U	Vilnius University	Technology demonstration		23 Jun 2017	PSLV		Part of the QB50 project
ASTERIA	1998-067NH (43020)	6U	NASA (JPL)	Technology demonstrator, space telescope	Completed	14 Aug 2017	Falcon-9		Launched with SpaceX CRS-12 ISS mission. Deployed on 20 Nov 2017. Last contact on 5 Dec 2019.
OSIRIS-3U		3U	Pennsylvania State University SSPL	In situ measurements of temporal and spatial characteristics of ionospheric space weather	Under development	14 Aug 2017	Falcon 9 ISS		Constellation of three 1U spacecraft launched simultaneously and orbiting in linear formation. Accepted to NASA's CubeSat Launch Initiative in 2013.
Asgardia-1	2017-071N (43049)	2U	Space Kingdom of Asgardia	Solid-state storage testing while in LEO	Active	12 Nov 2017	Antares 230		Deployed into orbit by Cygnus CRS OA-8E on 6 December 2017, 22:40:22 UTC
EcAMSat	1998-067NG (43019)	6U	Santa Clara University	Biological research	Active	12 Nov 2017	Antares 230		
PicSat	2018-004W (43131)	3U	Paris Observatory; CNRS	Astronomy/Planetary science	Active	12 Jan 2018	PSLV		Part of the PSLV-C40 mission
UBAKUSAT	1998-067NP (43466)	3U	Istanbul Technical University	Technology demonstration and Earth observation satellite to provide voice communications for amateur radio stations	Active	2 Apr 2018	Falcon-9 SpaceX CRS-14		Deployed from ISS in May 2018.
1KUNS-PF	1998-067NQ (43467)	1U	University of Nairobi	Mapping of Kenya's land mass, monitoring of the coastline and helping combat illegal logging activities	Active	2 Apr 2018	Falcon-9 SpaceX CRS-14		Deployed from ISS in May 2018.
Irazú	1998-067NR (43468)	1U	Costa Rica Institute of Technology	Monitoring carbon, humidity, and temperature levels in Costa Rican forests	Active	2 Apr 2018	Falcon-9 SpaceX CRS-14		Deployed from ISS in May 2018. Intended First Costa Rican and Central American CubeSat
DebrisSat 1 & 2	1998-067PM; 1998-067PR	2U each	Surrey Satellite Technology	Debris removal technology demonstration	Active	2 Apr 2018	Falcon-9 SpaceX CRS-14		Deployed from ISS in Jun 2018 as part of the RemoveDEBRIS project.
Mars Cube One (MarCO)		6U each	NASA	Telecom technology	Completed Mars flyby and successful relay	5 May 2018	Atlas V 401		2 identical 6U; launched with InSight lander first CubeSats to operate beyond Earth orbit
EQUiSat		1U	Brown University	Open-source satellite to encourage involvement of students and amateurs in aerospace design.	Launched	21 May 2018	TBD		Accepted to NASA's CubeSat Launch Initiative in 2014
MemSat		1U	Rowan University	Resilience of Resistive Memory in Space Conditions	Launched	21 May 2018	Antares Cygnus		
BHUTAN-1	1998-067PF (43591)	1U	Kyushu Institute of Technology	Technology demonstration	Active	29 Jun 2018	Falcon-9		Launched with SpaceX CRS-15 and deployed from the ISS in August 2018. Part of the Birds-2 project
Maya-1	1998-067PE (43590)	1U	Kyushu Institute of Technology	Technology demonstration	Active	29 Jun 2018	Falcon-9 SpaceX CRS-15		Deployed from ISS on 10 Aug 2018. Part of the Birds-2 project
UiTMSAT-1	1998-067PD (43589)	1U	Universiti Teknologi MARA	Technology demonstration	Active	29 Jun 2018	Falcon-9 SpaceX CRS-15		Deployed from the ISS. Part of the Birds-2 project
DAVE (CP-7)		1U	PolySat / California Polytechnic State University	Technology demonstration mission	Active	15 Sep 2018	Delta-II from Vandenberg Air Force Base		DAVE is the 9th spacecraft launched by California Polytechnic State University
STARS-Me	1998-067PQ (43640)	2U	Shizuoka University, Japan	Small-scale demonstration of orbit elevator	Complete (Re-entered)	22 Sep 2018	H-2B-304	6 Oct 2021	Two attached 1U satellites
IRVINE01		1U	Irvine CubeSat STEM Program	Educational mission providing high school students experience building, testing, and controlling a nano-satellite to develop interest and talent in the science and engineering fields	Launched	11 Nov 2018	Electron KS		Built by high school students. Team composed of students from six public high schools in Tustin and Irvine, California.
IRVINE02		1U	Irvine CubeSat STEM Program	Test propulsion system and LED communications	Launched	3 Dec 2018	Falcon 9 SSO-A		Built by high school students. Selected by NASA for CubeSat Launch Initiative
JY1-Sat	2018-099AX	1U	Crown Prince Foundation (Jordan)	research	Launched	3 Dec 2018	Falcon 9 SSO-A		Intended first Jordanian CubeSat
MOVE-II	2018-099Y	1U	Technical University of Munich	Technical demonstration	Launched	3 Dec 2018	Falcon 9 SSO-A		
KNACKSAT	2018-099D (43761)	1U	King Mongkut's University of Technology North Bangkok	Technology demonstration	Launched	3 Dec 2018	Falcon 9 SSO-A		First CubeSat of Thailand
Delphini-1	1998-067PW (44030)	1U	Aarhus University	Proof of concept	Complete (Re-entered)	5 Dec 2018	Falcon-9	14 Mar 2021	First satellite from Aarhus University
UNITE		3U	University of Southern Indiana	Ionospheric research	Complete (Re-entered)	5 Dec 2018	Falcon-9 SpaceX CRS-16	21 Oct 2021	Launched to ISS.
CubeSail-1		3U	University of Illinois	Solar sail propulsion while in LEO	Launched	16 Dec 2018	Electron KS		Technology demo for UltraSail heliogyro
CubeSail-2		3U	University of Illinois	Solar sail propulsion while in LEO	Launched	16 Dec 2018	Electron KS		
RSat-P		3U	United States Naval Academy	Technology demonstration	Active	16 Dec 2018	Electron KS		Features 2 robotic arms, cameras and propulsion to repair other spacecraft.
Lume-1	2018-111AJ (43908)	2U	Alén Space/University of Vigo	Firefight	Active	27 Dec 2018	Soyuz		
Światowid	1998-067QL (44426)	2U	SatRevolution	In Orbit demonstration	Successful	17 Apr 2019	Antares 230		First satellite of SatRevolution S. A. First Polish Earth observation satellite.
Kraksat	1998-067QM (44427)	1U	SatRevolution	Test of ferromagnetic fluid reaction wheel.	Partial success	17 Apr 2019	Antares 230	17 Jan 2022	Satellite constantly rebooting and cannot fully start.
StangSat		1U	Merritt Island High School CubeSat in partnership with CalPoly	Shock and vibration experienced by payloads while in orbit.	Launched	25 Jun 2019	Falcon 9 Heavy		Will be second satellite to launch developed by a high school team. NASA's Launch Services Program sponsors and mentors the team. Demonstration flight occurred in 2013.
ACRUX-1	2019-037E (44369)	1U	Melbourne Space Program	Technical demonstration	Success	29 Jun 2019	Electron		Second Australian student-built satellite, following AO 5
TDO-1	2019-051B (44482)	12U	U.S. Air Force	Technology Demonstration	Active	8 Aug 2019	Atlas V 551		Technology Demonstration Orbiter for U.S. Air Force, launched with AEHF-5 satellite
STF-1	43852	3U	NASA IV&V		Active	16 Dec 2019	Electron		NASA ELaNa 19 mission, first satellite built in the State of West Virginia
OPS-SAT		3U	TU Graz, ESA	Experimental	Active	18 Dec 2019	Soyuz-Fregat (Soyuz VS23)	23 May 2024	Launched together with COSMO-SkyMed, CHEOPS, EyeSat and ANGELS.
SPOC	1998-067RR	3U	University of Georgia, UGA Small Satellite Research Laboratory	Earth Observation and Multispectral image analysis	Launched	10 Mar 2020	Antares 230+		Student built and the first satellite from the University of Georgia being built by the UGA Small Satellite Research Laboratory.
Napa-1	2020-061BA (46320)	6U	Royal Thai Air Force	Remote sensing	Active	3 Sep 2020	Vega		
Bobcat-1			Ohio University		Launched	5 Nov 2020	Deployed from International Space Station		NASA ELaNa 31 mission
NEUTRON-1			University of Hawaiʻi at Mānoa		Launched	5 Nov 2020	Deployed from the International Space Station with JEMRMS		NASA ELaNa 31 mission
SPectral Ocean Color (SPOC)		3U	University of Georgia	Remote sensing	Launched	5 Nov 2020	Deployed from the International Space Station with JEMRMS		NASA ELaNa 31 mission
CACTUS-1		3U	Capitol Technology University	Communications, Technology Demonstration	Launched	17 Jan 2021	LauncherOne		NASA ELaNa-XX series on Virgin Orbit's Launch Demo 2
CAPE-3		1U	University of Louisiana at Lafayette	Educational	Launched	17 Jan 2021	LauncherOne		NASA ELaNa-XX series on Virgin Orbit's Launch Demo 2
EXOCUBE-2		3U	California Polytechnic University	Weather	Launched	17 Jan 2021	LauncherOne		NASA ELaNa-XX series on Virgin Orbit's Launch Demo 2
MiTEE		3U	University of Michigan	Space Technology	Launched	17 Jan 2021	LauncherOne		NASA ELaNa-XX series on Virgin Orbit's Launch Demo 2
PICS-1 & PICS-2		1U	Brigham Young University	Technology Demonstration	Launched	17 Jan 2021	LauncherOne		NASA ELaNa-XX series on Virgin Orbit's Launch Demo 2
PolarCube		3U	University of Colorado Boulder	Remote sensing	Launched	17 Jan 2021	LauncherOne		NASA ELaNa-XX series on Virgin Orbit's Launch Demo 2
Q-PACE		3U	University of Central Florida	Space Science	Launched	17 Jan 2021	LauncherOne		NASA ELaNa-XX series on Virgin Orbit's Launch Demo 2
RadFXSat-2	2021-002C (47311)	3U	Vanderbilt University	Communications	Launched	17 Jan 2021	LauncherOne		NASA ELaNa-XX series on Virgin Orbit's Launch Demo 2
TechEdSat-7		1U	NASA Ames Research Center	Educational	Launched	17 Jan 2021	LauncherOne		NASA ELaNa-XX series on Virgin Orbit's Launch Demo 2
BCCSAT-1	2021-022AK (48041)	1U	Bangkok Christian College	Educational	Decayed	22 March 2021	Soyuz-2	19 Sept 2024	
TDO-3	2021-042B (48619)	12U	United States Air Force Academy	Technology Demonstration	Complete (Re-entered)	18 May 2021	Atlas V 421	27 Sep 2022	Launched with the SBIRS GEO-5 satellite
TDO-4	2021-042C (48620)	12U	United States Air Force Academy	Technology Demonstration	Complete (Re-entered)	18 May 2021	Atlas V 421	18 Sep 2022	Launched with the SBIRS GEO-5 satellite
NAPA-2	2021-059CN (48963)	6U	Royal Thai Air Force	Remote sensing	Active	30 Jun 2021	Falcon 9		
Binar 1		1U	Curtin University	Technology Demonstration	Launched	28 Aug 2021	Falcon 9	1 Oct 2022	Launched with SpaceX CRS-23 and deployed from the ISS on 6 Oct 2021
LICIACube	2021-110C	6U	ASI	flyby	Active	24 Nov 2021	Falcon 9		Flyby of 65803 Didymos system, Deployed via DART
GASPACS	1998-067TB (51439)	1U	Utah State University's Undergraduate Get Away Special team	Technology Demonstration	Active	21 Dec 2021	Launched to ISS via Falcon 9, Deployed via Nanoracks CubeSat Deployer		NASA sponsored via CubeSat Launch Initiative. First solely undergraduate built CubeSat. First CubeSat to use Raspberry Pi as flight computer.
SteamSat 2	2022-003F (51099)	3U	SatRevolution	Test of steam propulsion system.	Launched	13 Jan 2022	LauncherOne		
SW1FT	2022-002DK	3U	SatRevolution	Shared platform for max 8 payloads	Launched	13 Jan 2022	Falcon 9 Transporter 3		Built by SatRevolution S.A. It is a commercial shared platform..
LabSat	2022-002DG (51086)	3U	Politechnika Wrocławska, Uniwersytet Medyczny we Wrocławiu, SatRevolution	Biological experiment satellite.	Launched	13 Jan 2022	Falcon 9 Transporter-3		
AuroraSat-1	2022–047	1.5U	Aurora Propulsion Technologies	Test of water-fueled space propulsion system	Launched	5 Feb 2022	Electron KS		
ArgoMoon	2022-156G	6U	ASI and NASA	Technology; reconnaissance	Launched	16 Nov 2022	SLS Block 1 Artemis 1		
OMOTENASHI	2022-156D (55904)	6U	JAXA	Technology; reconnaissance	Launched	16 Nov 2022	SLS Block 1 Artemis 1		
EQUULEUS	2022-156E (55905)	6U	The University of Tokyo and JAXA	Technology; reconnaissance	Launched	16 Nov 2022	SLS Block 1 Artemis 1		
LunaH-Map	2022-156J (57685)	6U	NASA	Technology; reconnaissance	Launched	16 Nov 2022	SLS Block 1 Artemis 1		
CuSP	2022-156M	6U	NASA	Space Weather, solar winds	Launched	16 Nov 2022	SLS Block 1 Artemis 1		
Lunar IceCube	2022-156C (55903)	6U	NASA	Technology; reconnaissance	Launched	16 Nov 2022	SLS Block 1 Artemis 1		
LunIR	2022-156K (57686)	6U	Lockheed Martin	Technology; reconnaissance	Launched	16 Nov 2022	SLS Block 1 Artemis 1		
BioSentinel	2022-156F	6U	NASA	Study of radiation effects	Launched	16 Nov 2022	SLS Block 1 Artemis 1		
Team Miles	2022-156L	6U	Fluid and Reason LLC	Technology	Launched	16 Nov 2022	SLS Block 1 Artemis 1		Secondary payload on Artemis 1
NEA Scout	2022-156H (57684)	6U	NASA	Technology; reconnaissance	Launched	16 Nov 2022	SLS Block 1 Artemis 1		
SPORT		6U	Brazilian Space Agency and NASA	Space Weather	Launched	26 Nov 2022	Falcon 9 CRS-26		
LORIS		2U	Dalhousie University- Canadian CubeSat Project (Canadian Space Agency)	Testing flight instruments, take images of coastline	Launched	26 Nov 2022	Falcon 9 CRS-26		Nanoracks ISS deployment. Two remote sensing payloads; a Visible spectrum imager, and a Near-Infrared imager
ORCASat		2U	University of Victoria – Canadian CubeSat Project (Canadian Space Agency)		Launched	26 Nov 2022	Falcon 9 CRS-26		
DanteSat		3U	NPC SpaceMind (Italy)		Launched	26 Nov 2022	Falcon 9 CRS-26		
NUTSat		2U	Gran Systems (Taiwan)		Launched	26 Nov 2022	Falcon 9 CRS-26		
petitSat		6U	NASA Goddard (NASA CSLI)		Launched	26 Nov 2022	Falcon 9 CRS-26		
MARIO		3U	University of Michigan (NASA CSLI)		Launched	26 Nov 2022	Falcon 9 CRS-26		
TJREVERB		2U	Thomas Jefferson High School, Virginia		Launched	26 Nov 2022	Falcon 9 CRS-26		
Lunar Flashlight	2022-168B (54697)	6U	NASA	Technology; reconnaissance	Launched	11 Dec 2022	Falcon 9 Block 5		Launched as a rideshare with the Hakuto-R Mission 1 on 11 December 2022 07:38:23 UTC
TROPICS 05 / TROPICS 06	2023-062A (56442) / 2023-062C (56444)	3U	NASA	Earth observation	Launched	8 May 2023	Electron		First two cubesats of the TROPICS satellite constellation successfully launched into orbit
EIRSAT-1	2023-185L (58472)	2U	University College Dublin	Technology demonstration	Launched	1 Dec 2023	Falcon 9		First Irish satellite
NARITCube-1		3U	National Astronomical Research Institute of Thailand	Technology demonstration	Destroyed. Launch failure	18 Dec 2024	Space One KAIROS		
LASARsat		1U	DoSpace	Test laser as a solution to space debris	Launched	21 December 2024	Falcon 9		First Czech student satellite
Starling 1	2023-100C (57388)	6U	NASA Ames Research Center	Swarm Technology Demonstration	Active	18 July 2023	Electron		
Starling 2	2023-100B (57387)	6U	NASA Ames Research Center	Swarm Technology Demonstration	Active	18 July 2023	Electron		
Starling 3	2023-100D (57389)	6U	NASA Ames Research Center	Swarm Technology Demonstration	Active	18 July 2023	Electron		
Starling 4	2023-100A (57386)	6U	NASA Ames Research Center	Swarm Technology Demonstration	Active	18 July 2023	Electron		

== List of CubeSats in development or waiting to launch ==
Name	ID	Type	Organization	Mission	Mission status	Planned launch year	Launch vehicle	Est Lifetime	Remarks
SOLARAS S2		1U	Grahaa Space	Technology Demonstration for Solar Observation and Satellite Communication	Scheduled for Launch	November 22, 2025	Innospace HANBIT-NANO	~2 Years	Nanosatellite for Solar Observation and Satellite Communication
UTNSat-01		1U	UTN San Nicolás	SDR reception Proof of Concept at Low Earth Orbit	Under Development	TBD	TBD		First UTN Satellite
StudSat-2		30 cm × 30 cm × 15 cm (11.8 in × 11.8 in × 5.9 in)	Nitte Meenakshi Institute of Technology and Consortium	Remote Sensing, satellite separation mechanism and drag sail deployment test	Under development	TBD	PSLV		Twin satellite mission
Koios		1U	University of Auckland, New Zealand	A mission to inspire more children in New Zealand to pursue a career in STEM by allowing them to interact with and learn from a real-life satellite.	Under development	2021	TBD		
ET-SAT		1U (QB50 type)	Ethiopian Space Science Society by help of Belgian Von Karman Institute	Research	In development	TBD	TBD		Will be first Ethiopian satellite
Ethosat 1			Ethiopian Space Science Society by help of Finnish Space Technology and Science Group	Research	In development	TBD	TBD		
MOCI		3U	University of Georgia, UGA Small Satellite Research Laboratory	Technical and Algorithmic demonstrations of Structure from motion	In development	NET 2023	TBD		The first satellite mission dedicated to structure from motion in LEO.
DOGE-1		n/a	Geometric Energy Corporation	obtain "lunar-spatial intelligence from sensors and cameras on-board"	Under development	TBD	n/a		
CLIMB		3U	University of Applied Sciences Wiener Neustadt	Educational mission to the Van Allen radiation belt using electric propulsion, conducting radiation dose and magnetic field measurements	Under Development	NET 2023	TBD		
CySat I		1U	Iowa State University, Softronics Ltd.	Wide bandwidth radiometer for measurement of various electromagnetic spectra emanating from cities. Also proof of concept for students, faculty, and industry partners.	Under development	NET 2023	TBD		
RHOK-SAT		1U	Rhodes College	Technology; Undergraduate research;Testing Perovskite cells in space.	Under development	TBD	TBD		
RVSAT-1		2U	R.V. College of Engineering	Micrbiological Payload	Under Development	NET 2023	PSLV		
Cislunar Explorers		6U	Cornell University	Technology; reconnaissance	Under Development	NET 2024	TBD		
Earth Escape Explorer (CU-E^{3})		6U	University of Colorado Boulder	Technology; reconnaissance	Under development	NET 2024	TBD		
SlugSat		2U	UC Santa Cruz	Launch a linear transponder for use in HF amateur radio communications into Low Earth Orbit	Under Development	NET 2024	TBD		Secondary science payload for the Santa Cruz Institute for Particle Physics
LBSat		3U	Indian Institute of Technology, Guwahati, India	LactoBacillus Species testing under Microgravity Environment	Under development	NET 2025			The First Biosatellite program of IIT Guwahati
Pleiades-Orpheus		1U	Irvington CubeSat	Satellite designed by Irvington High School students to analyze light pollution trends over the lifetime of the satellite	Not launched, expected in Nov 2024	Q4 2024	Falcon 9	n.a.	Launched as a rideshare with the Bandwagon-2 mission
KNACKSAT-2		3U	King Mongkut's University of Technology North Bangkok	Technology demonstration	Not launched, expected in 2025	NET 2025	TBD		
PULSE-A		2U	University of Chicago	Demonstrating polarization-modulated optical communications using a laser downlink in a 0.5U payload.	Under development, launch expected in 2026	NET 2026	TBD	6–14 months	Designed by first undergraduate aerospace laboratory at the University of Chicago.
Gamma-ray Transients Monitor		1U, 2 modules	National Tsing Hua University, Academia Sinica and TASA	To track Gamma Ray Bursts (GRBs) and other bright gamma-ray transients with energies ranging from 50 keV to 2 MeV.	Development over, testing stage .	Q4 2026	Falcon 9	3–4 years	First astronomical satellite from Taiwan.

== List of cancelled CubeSats ==
Name	ID	Type	Organization	Mission	Mission status	Remarks
α (formerly CubeMessenger)		1U	BOREAS Space	Technological demonstration	Nanosats.eu Canceled	
Azad-1		TBD	Maulana Azad National Institute of Technology		Nanosats.eu Canceled	
CubeSail		3U	University of Surrey	Solar sail propulsion while in LEO	Canceled	
CubeSTAR		2U	University of Oslo	Measure the structures of electron clouds in the ionosphere using Langmuir probe	Nanosats.eu Canceled	
DynaCube-3U		3U	Denel Dynamics Engineering Academy of Learning	Graduate development program. Capture images, electromagnetic radiation mapping, and structural temperature analysis.	Nanosat.eu canceled	
ECE^{3}SAT		1U	ECE Paris	Technical demonstration of Electrodynamic tether for satellite deorbiting	Nanosats.eu - canceled	Built by engineering students. The whole work is under open-source/creative commons licenses and available via ECE^{3}SAT's website and wiki.
ERPSat01		1U	Sfax School of Engineering, Tunisia	Communications	Canceled	Will be the first Tunisian satellite
NUTS-1		2U	Norwegian University of Science and Technology	Student satellite project to design and develop a new CubeSat bus using carbon fiber material for the main structure.	Canceled	
Politech.1		3U	Universidad Politecnica de Valencia Spain	Atmospheric research	Canceled	
ThapSat		2U	Thapar Institute of Engineering and Technology, Patiala	Monitoring Green house gases.	Canceled	
UoS^{3}		1U	University of Southampton	Student education; Experimental research to improve predictions for re-entry of uncontrolled resident space objects.	Canceled	
InQube		1U	Paradox Sonic Space Research Association	Technical demonstration of COTS in space; Experimental research to analyze attitude and inertial conditions onboard bus in the orbit.	Canceled	First open-source satellite of India.
