= Exos =

Exos may refer to:

- EXOS, an athletics company
- In video games, exos means powered exoskeletons
- In medicine, exos is short for the exosome complex
- Lotus Exos, see Lotus Cars
- "EXOS", a 2016 song by Blank Banshee from MEGA

== Rockets ==
- Exos Aerospace company
- Mu (rocket family), the Japanese EXOS-A, B, C, and D
- RM-86 Exos rockets circa 1960
- The EXOS payload in the ExoCube (CP-10) satellite

== Software ==
- EXOS (Excelan), a brand by network company Excelan
- EXOS, short for ExtremeXOS network operating system
- ExOS, short for Exokernel operating system kernel
