= Simulation-to-Flight 1 =

Microsatellite

Simulation-to-Flight 1 (STF-1)
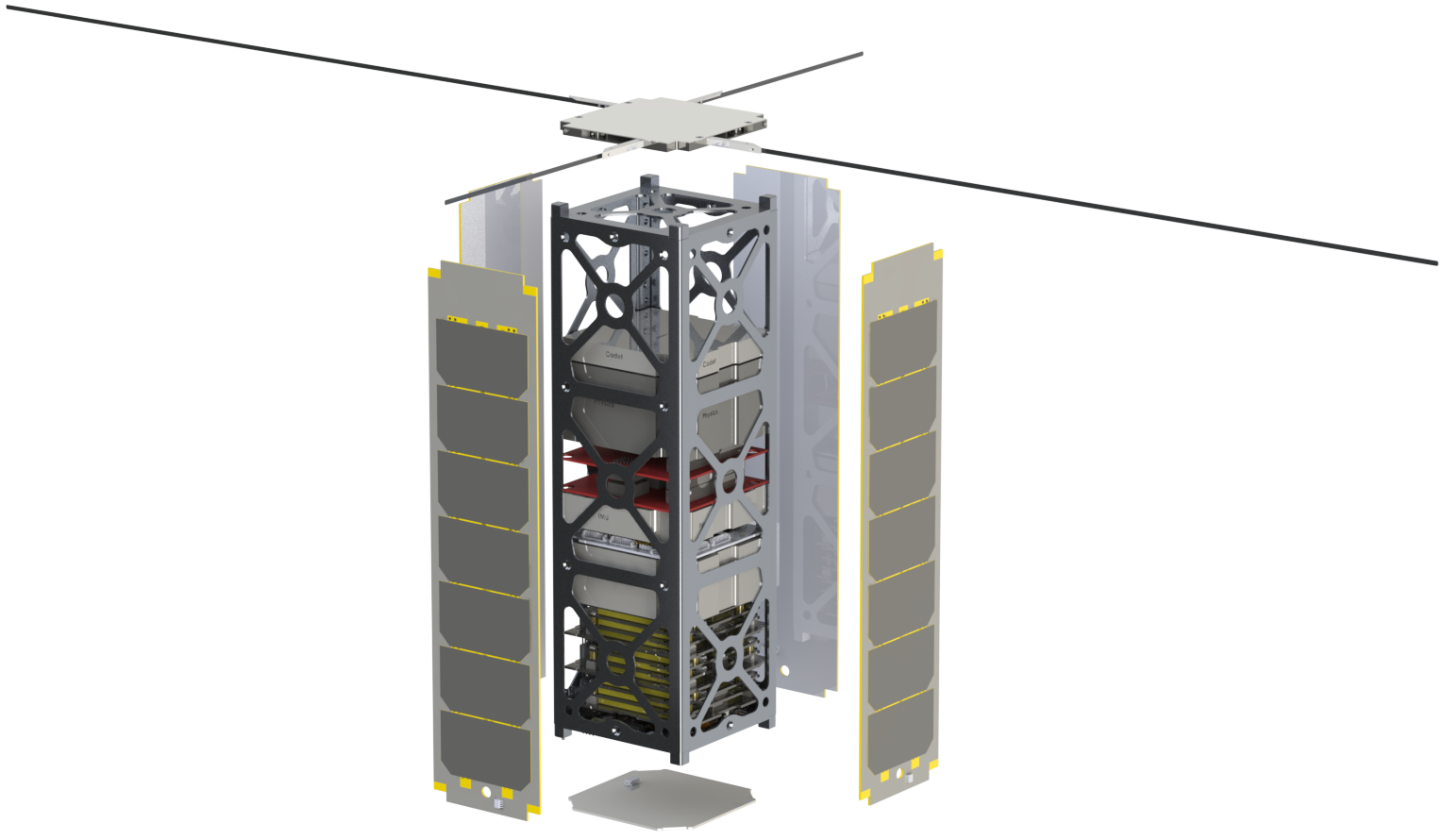
- Exploded View of STF-1
- Mission type: Technology demonstration

Spacecraft properties
- Spacecraft: STF-1
- Bus: 3U CubeSat
- Manufacturer: Katherine Johnson Independent Verification and Validation Facility
- Launch mass: ≈ 4 kg (8.8 lb)
- Dimensions: 10 × 10 × 30 cm

Start of mission
- Launch date: 16 December 2018
- Rocket: Electron
- Launch site: Mahia LC-1
- Contractor: Rocket Lab

End of mission
- Decay date: 21 February 2024

Orbital parameters
- Reference system: Geocentric
- Regime: Low Earth orbit
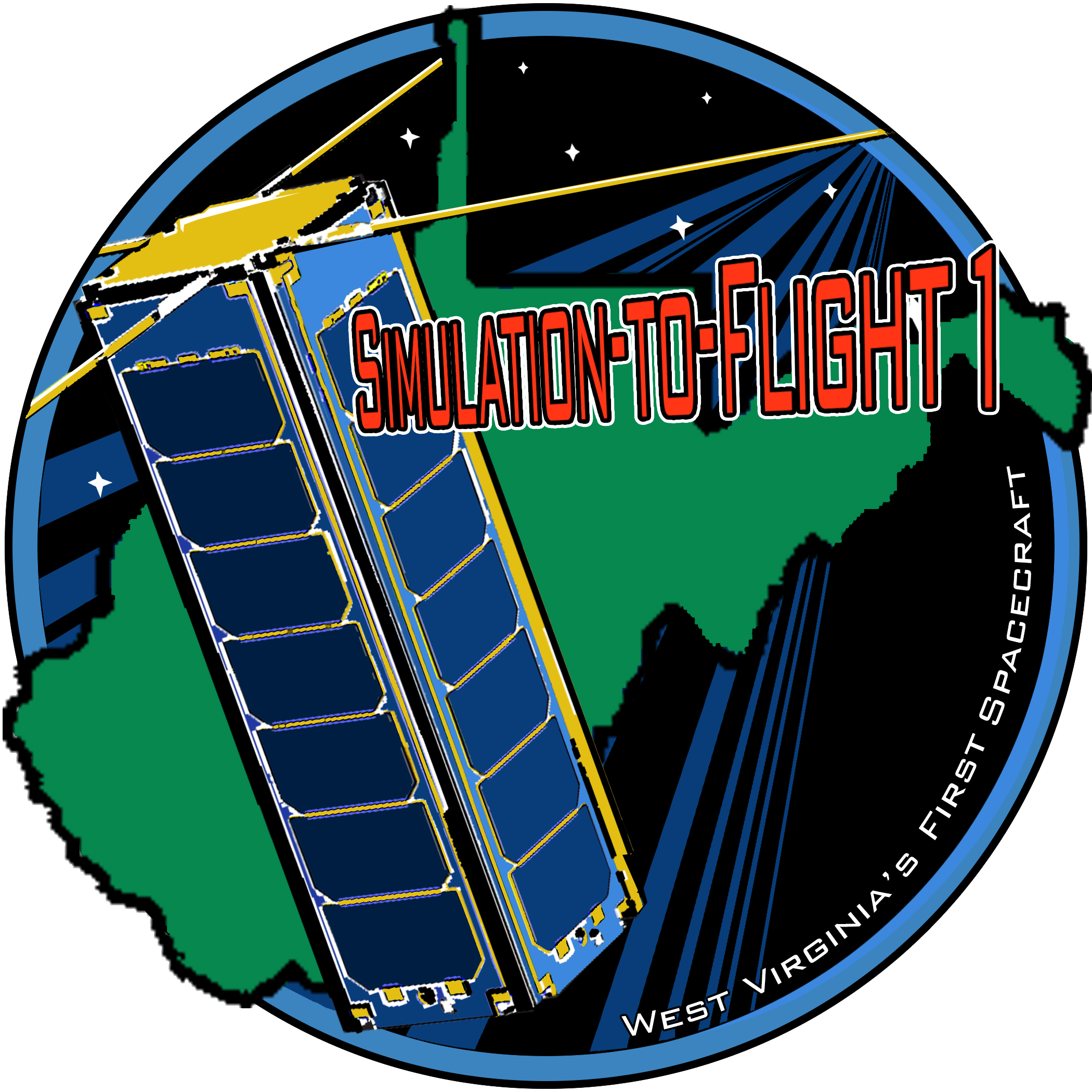

Simulation-to-Flight 1 (STF-1) is a microsatellite built by the Katherine Johnson Independent Verification and Validation Facility (IV&V) in Fairmont, West Virginia with the collaboration of the West Virginia Space Grants Consortium and West Virginia University.

STF-1 was launched on 16 December 2018 on an Electron rocket as part of NASA's Educational Launch of Nanosatellites (ELaNa) Mission 19.

The satellite reentered the atmosphere on 21 February 2024

== Overview ==
Simulation-to-Flight 1 (STF-1) is West Virginia’s first spacecraft to reach orbit. Its purpose is to demonstrate the capabilities of NASA Operational Simulation (NOS) technologies for small satellites and provide a platform for WVU to launch research projects into Low Earth orbit. Along with NASA's mission, WVU is conducting four separate tests. This includes the testing of space weather's effects on spacecraft, the durability of III-V Nitride-Based Materials for shielding spacecraft components from deterioration factors such as micrometeorites, Inertial Measurement Unit Swarm for developing a more power and size efficient IMU for CubeSats, and Precise Orbit Determination (POD) to determine STF-1's exact location by communicating with a variety of other satellites

== Description ==
STF-1 was built under NASA’s CubeSat Launch Initiative, where potential launch opportunities are provided to select CubeSat proposals from NASA Centers, accredited US educational or non-profit organizations. NASA’s main goal in this initiative is to provide CubeSat developers access to a low-cost pathway to conduct research in the areas of science, exploration, technology development, education or operations. JSTAR’s main goal in this mission is to fully demonstrate the capabilities of the NASA Operational Simulation (NOS) technologies, most notably its development of the NASA Operational Simulation for Small Satellites, or NOS3, which aims to shorten development lifecycles for CubeSats by providing a virtualized integrated simulator.

STF-1 has the capability of recording data once it’s launched into orbit around Earth.

The NOS technologies, among them NOS3, have been successfully utilized on James Webb Space Telescope, Global Precipitation Measurement, Juno, and Deep Space Climate Observatory in the areas of software development, mission operations/training, verification and validation, test procedure development, and software systems check-out.

As of 1 January 2022, STF-1 is still orbiting Earth in Low Earth orbit and operating nominally under the control of the JSTAR team.

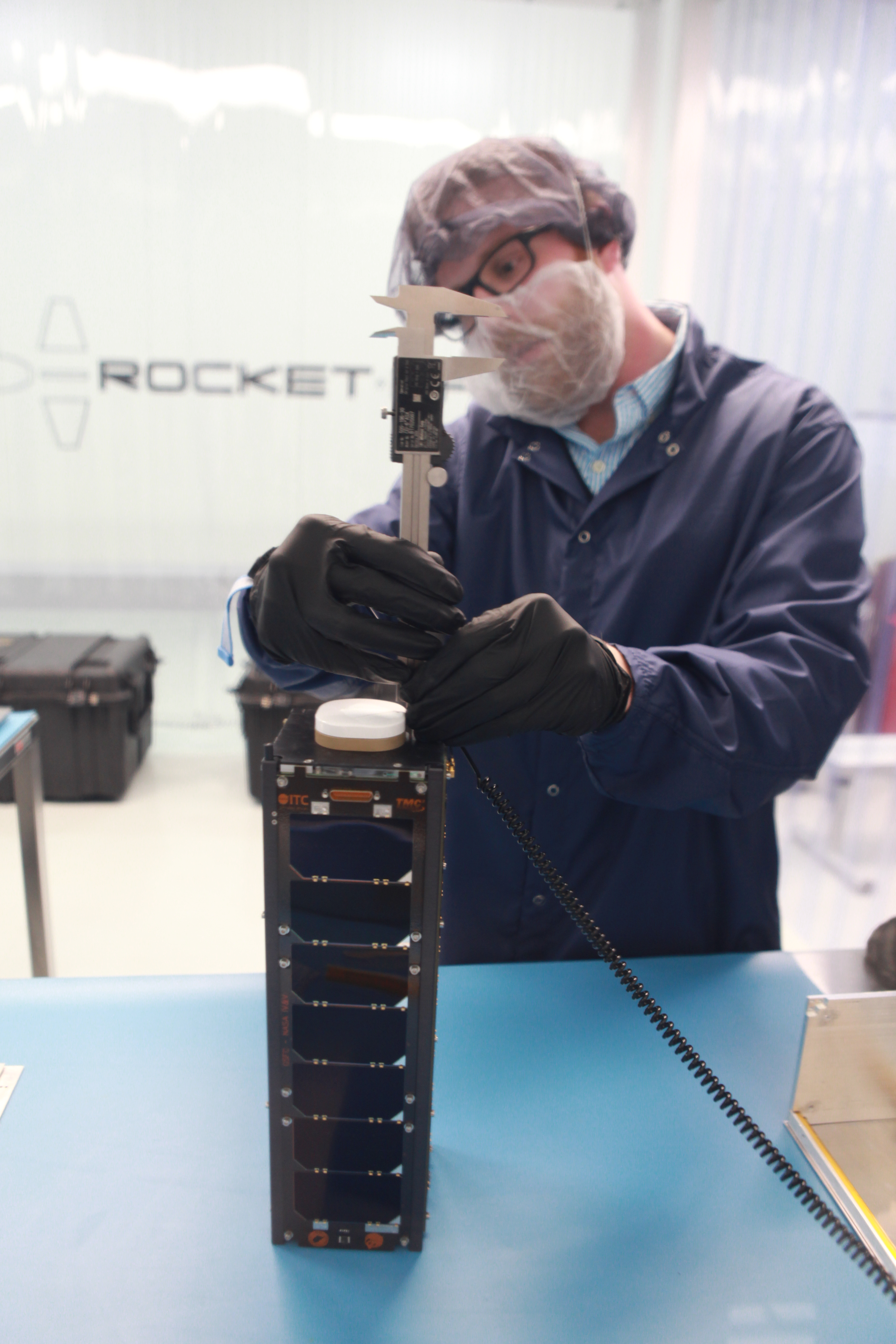
Engineer measuring STF-1 prior to loading into CubeSat deployer

== West Virginia University Research Payloads ==
=== WVU Physics and Astronomy: Space Weather ===
The WVU Physics and Astronomy team will analyze the effects of the orbital environment on technologies such as spacecraft, based upon the results they collect from instruments such as a Langmuir probe, a radio sounder, and particle counters. The Langmuir probe will be used to measure electron density and temperature of the ionosphere, while the radio sounder will collect plasma density information and magnetic field measurements. Additionally, the particle counters will detect high fluxes of precipitating electrons, which can produce surface and deep dielectric charging on a CubeSat. It is expected that these measurements taken will aid in the understanding of the orbital environment and predictions the state of the ionosphere.

=== WVU Lane Department of Computer Science and Electrical Engineering: III-V Nitride-Based Materials ===
This team is employing a precision optoelectronic sensor module containing arrays of light-emitting diodes (LEDs) and photodiodes (PDs) for short-range distance measurement and shape rendering. However, because of the extremely low temperatures and high levels of radiation in orbit, shielding is necessary to ensure the reliability and functionality of the optoelectronic sensor module. Their intent is to test the durability of III-V Nitride-Based Materials for instrument shielding, as well as test the performance of the core components of the sensor at various conditions in space. As a result, the department will be able to determine the optimal thickness for sufficient shielding and extended measurement capabilities.

=== WVU Mechanical and Aerospace Engineering (MAE): MEMS IMU Swarm ===
Traditionally, high-end IMUs are much larger and more expensive than a regular CubeSat mission can accommodate. However, the WVU MAE Team designed a cluster of 32 smaller, less expensive IMUs with the idea that the averaged results will be extremely accurate. The 2nd generation of this design successfully performed its mission on a sounding rocket in late 2015. The 3rd generation, which overcame the typical size, weight, and power (Swaps) constraints caused by a CubeSat, will be flown on STF-1.

=== WVU Mechanical and Aerospace Engineering: Precise Orbit Determination (POD) ===
WVU's MAE Department will be employing a Novatel OEM615 GPS Receiver for the STF-1 mission. This GPS Receiver will ensure Precise Orbit Determination (POD) accuracy through processing collected data using NASA's GIPSY-OASIS technology. This technology utilizes the GPS data received from a variety of other satellites to determine STF-1's exact location.

== Milestones ==
=== Contract awarded ===
- Late April 2015 | STF-1 Team was contracted by the NASA Education Launch of Nanosatellites (Elana)

=== STF-1 Delivered to Rocket Lab for payload checkup and final preparations ===
- 12 April 2018 | STF-1 CubeSat getting loaded into the deployed inside Rocket Lab's facility located at Huntington Beach California
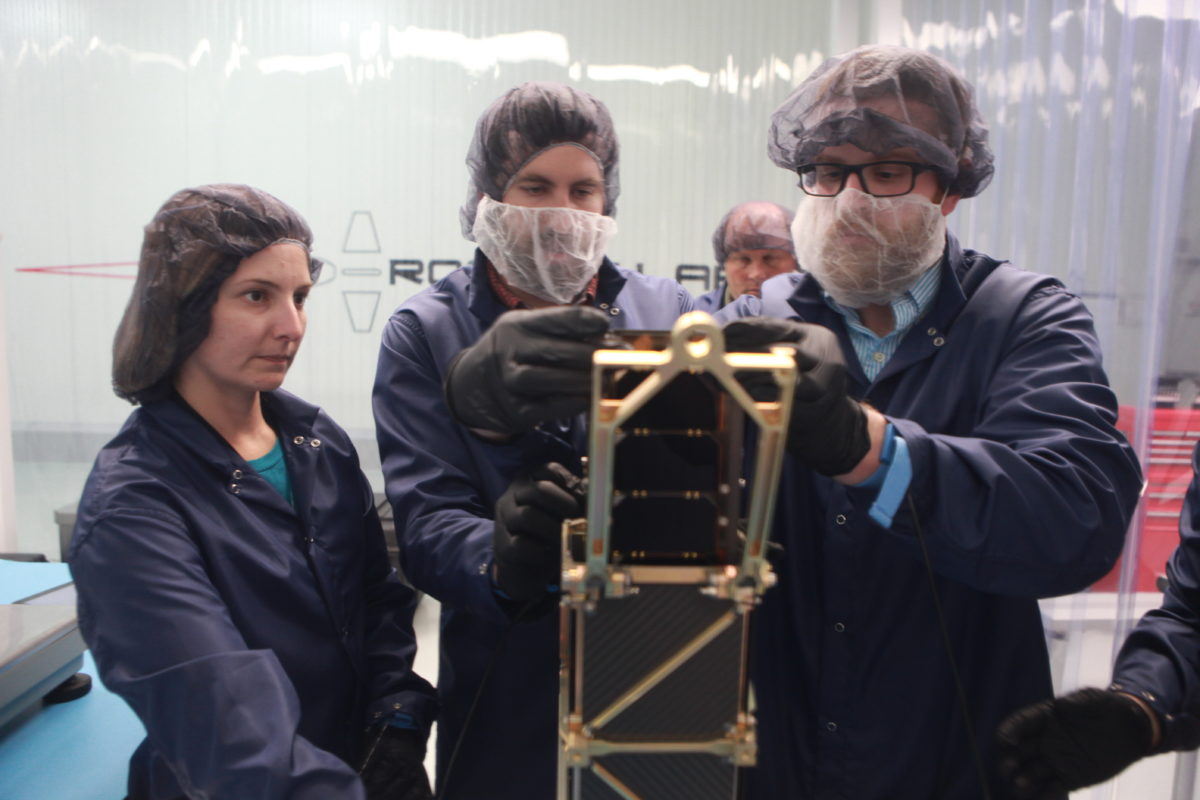
  STF-1 Loading into CubeSat deployed

=== Successful launch into LEO ===
- 16 December 2018 | Successful launch into Low Earth orbit

=== First contact ===
- 19 December 2018 | STF-1 team made successful contact with West Virginia’s First Spacecraft, STF-1

=== First image received ===
- 3 January 2019 | STF-1's First Captured Image (The Sun is seen reflecting off STF-1's VHF antenna)
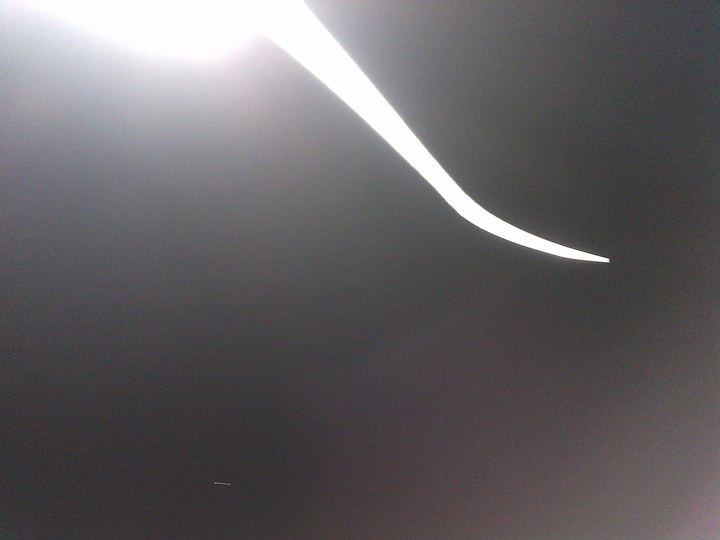
  The first image received from STF-1 was the sun reflecting off the VHF antenna

== See also ==
- NASA
- Katherine Johnson Independent Verification and Validation Facility
- West Virginia University
- National Space Grant College and Fellowship Program
