= AAU CubeSat =

CubeSat built and operated by Aalborg University, Denmark

- Computer simulated image of AAU CubeSat in orbit around Earth
- Names: Aalborg University CubeSat; AAUSat-1
- Mission type: Technology demonstration
- Operator: AAU Student Space
- COSPAR ID: 2003-031G
- SATCAT no.: 27846
- Website: www.aausatii.aau.dk
- Mission duration: 1 month (planned); 2.5 months (achieved)

Spacecraft properties
- Spacecraft: Aalborg University CubeSat
- Spacecraft type: 1U CubeSat
- Bus: CubeSat
- Manufacturer: AAU Student Space
- Launch mass: 1 kg (2.2 lb)
- Dimensions: 10 × 10 × 10 cm (3.9 × 3.9 × 3.9 in)

Start of mission
- Launch date: 30 June 2003, 14:15:26 UTC
- Rocket: Rokot/Briz-KM No. 7
- Launch site: Plesetsk, Site 133/3
- Contractor: Khrunichev State Research and Production Space Center

End of mission
- Declared: 22 Sep 2003

Orbital parameters
- Reference system: Geocentric orbit
- Regime: Sun-synchronous orbit
- Perigee altitude: 818 km (508 mi)
- Apogee altitude: 830 km (520 mi)
- Inclination: 98.7°
- Period: 101.4 minutes

AAU CubeSat was a CubeSat built and operated by students from Aalborg University in Denmark. AAU CubeSat was launched on 30 June 2003 from the Plesetsk Cosmodrome on a Russian Rockot launch vehicle.

The satellite was alive for two and a half months, during which some data was received on Earth; however, it was never possible to establish a solid communication link. It is thought that there was a problem with the on-board transmitter.

== Spacecraft ==
The aluminium frame was milled from a solid block to ensure that a strong and lightweight frame was created. There are four rails to allow the satellite to slide in and out of the frame. The four rails are connected by other aluminium pieces. The subsystem circuit boards are screwed onto these pieces. Carbon-fiber plates are then glued onto the outside of the frame to support the solar panels and attitude control coils. The solar panels and attitude control coils are glued to the plates.

== Payload ==
AAU CubeSat's payload is a CMOS digital camera. It has a resolution of 1.3 megapixels and has a color depth of 24 bit. From the satellite's 830-kilometre (520 mi) altitude, the camera will capture pictures with a resolution of 120 by 110 metres (390 ft × 360 ft) per pixel. The camera-chip was provided by a company called Devitech which is in Aalborg. The Copenhagen Optical Group and the mechanical group developed the lens system. The structure for the lens system is made out of titanium.

== Communications ==
The communications systems on the satellite are composed of a modem and a radio. The radio is a SX450 type radio from Wood and Douglas. It broadcasts at 500 mW. The modem is a MX909 chip. It runs at 9600 baud and has many features such as:

- GMSK
- Scrambling
- Checksums
- Forward Error Correction
- Interleaving

== Attitude Determination and Control System ==
The ADCS aims the camera in the right direction, (away from the Sun) and positions all three sides with solar panels to be facing the Sun for maximum power output. The satellite is positioned by three coils of wire that generate a magnetic field that interacts with Earth's magnetic field. These interactions change the attitude and orientation of the satellite. The sensor array that determines attitude is made up of a magnetometer and a Sun sensor. The magnetometer was provided by Honeywell and determines the direction of Earth's magnetic field. The Sun sensors are planar photo diodes that detect the intensity of incoming sunlight.

== Specifications ==
- Size: 10 by 10 by 10 centimetres (3.9 in × 3.9 in × 3.9 in)
- Mass: 1 kilogram (2.2 lb)
- Power: Batteries, solar panels

== See also ==
- List of CubeSats
