= Starling Mission =

NASA Program

Starling
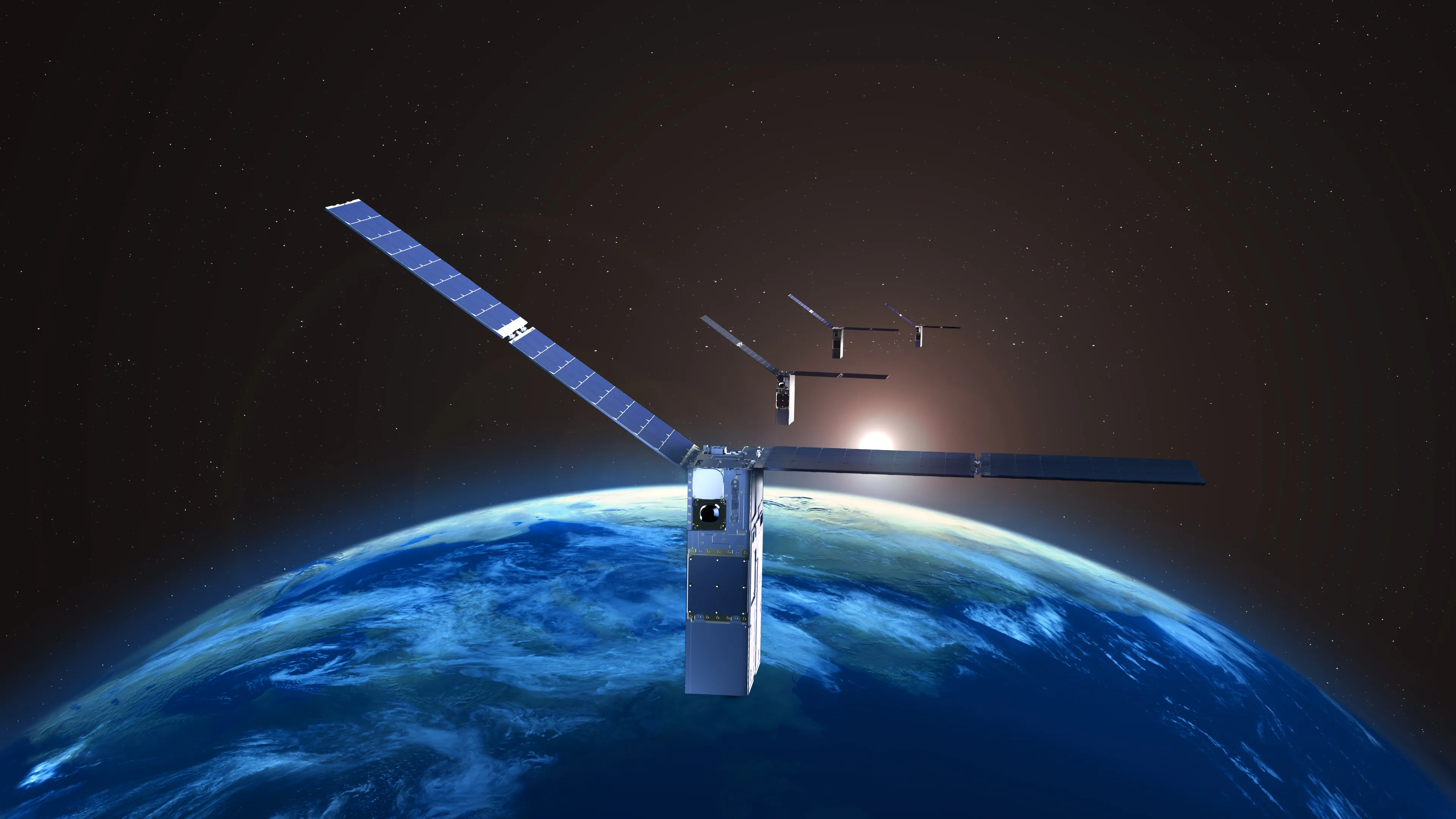
- Artistic Rendering of Starling spacecraft in orbit
- Mission type: Technology Demonstration
- Operator: NASA Ames Research Center
- COSPAR ID: 2023-100A, 2023-100B, 2023-100C, 2023-100D
- SATCAT no.: 57386, 57387, 57388, 57389
- Website: Official website
- Mission duration: Ongoing

Spacecraft properties
- Spacecraft type: 6U CubeSat
- Bus: CubeSat
- Manufacturer: NASA Ames Research Center, Blue Canyon Technologies, CesiumAstro

Start of mission
- Launch date: July 18, 2023
- Rocket: Rocket Lab Electron
- Launch site: Rocket Lab Launch Complex 1
- Contractor: Rocket Lab

Orbital parameters
- Regime: LEO

The Starling Mission is a 4 spacecraft, 6U cubesat swarm mission run by NASA Ames Research Center. Starling achieved several firsts in space, such as fully distributed autonomous operations and planning.

== Mission overview ==
NASA's Starling mission is a 4 spacecraft technology demonstration mission designed to advance the readiness of various technologies for cooperative groups of spacecraft – also known as distributed space systems or swarms. Starling is demonstrating technologies to enable multipoint science data collection by several small spacecraft flying in swarms. The mission uses four CubeSats in low-Earth orbit to test four technologies that let spacecraft operate in a synchronized manner without resources from the ground.

The Spacecraft were tested and assembled at NASA Ames Research Center. The propulsion system is an additively manufactured system built by NASA, the spacecraft bus was built by Blue Canyon Technologies, and the crosslink radios were built by CesiumAstro.

== Technology demonstrations ==
Starling's initial technology demonstrations focused on how groups of spacecraft can operate cooperatively using onboard autonomy instead of relying heavily on ground control. The mission consisted of four initial experimental technology demonstrations:

- Mobile Ad-hoc Network (MANET): This experiment allowed to automatically establish a crosslink networking via two-way S-band crosslink radios.
- Starling Formation-Flying Optical Experiment (StarFOX): This experiment used commercial star tracking cameras to detect other swarm spacecraft and calculate their own positions.
- Distributed Spacecraft Autonomy (DSA): This experiment demonstrated the ability to optimize data collection and rapid decision-making across the swarm.

The Starling mission extension demonstrated autonomous space traffic coordination between the four Starling spacecraft and SpaceX's Starlink constellation. Starling and SpaceX achieved this by testing new methods for rapidly coordinating collision avoidance maneuvers in low Earth orbit. The experiment tested and validated an automated conjunction screening service.
