= EQUiSat =

- Mission logo
- Mission type: Education
- COSPAR ID: 1998-067PA
- SATCAT no.: 43552
- Website: www.brownspace.io/equisat.html
- Mission duration: 3–6 months planned

Spacecraft properties
- Spacecraft type: 1U CubeSat
- Manufacturer: Brown University Space Engineering
- Dry mass: 1.3 kilograms (2.9 lb)
- Dimensions: 10cm cube

EQUiSat was a 1U (one unit) CubeSat designed and built by Brown Space Engineering (formerly Brown CubeSat Team), an undergraduate student group at Brown University's School of Engineering. EQUiSat's mission was to test a battery technology that had never flown in space which powered a beacon that was designed to be visible from Earth.

The satellite deorbited on 26 December 2020.

== Mission ==
The primary mission of EQUiSat was to prove the accessibility of space to the masses through both demonstration of a low-cost DIY CubeSat and educational outreach.

To further the primary mission, Brown Space Engineering maintains EQUiSat as a low-cost and rigorously documented open source project, allowing others to replicate EQUiSat's subsystems without large budgets or extensive expertise. The total cost of parts to reproduce EQUiSat is around $5,000. Brown Cubesat Team espouses a DIY philosophy to minimize costs, while also utilizing production processes that are widely achievable by and accessible to non-professionals. Brown Space Engineering's budget is very low compared to other CubeSats, and the goal is for the project to be replicated for under $5,000.

EQUiSat's second mission was to test the viability of operating LiFePO_{4} batteries in space. A LiFePO_{4} battery had never been flown in space, but it carries certain advantages over batteries of different chemistry, such as high current draw capabilities with less risk of thermal runaway than lithium-ion batteries.

=== Outreach ===
The other way for Brown Space Engineering to increase the accessibility of space is by educating youth on the design and role of satellites in society. Brown Space Engineering is cooperating with schools and museums across the country to develop an educational outreach plan to teach students and the general public about EQUiSat and the impact of it and similar satellites on scientific advancement of society. Upon launch, the opportunity to easily locate, hear, and see EQUiSat in the night sky provided an important tangible component to these outreach efforts. Another mode of outreach is the availability of EQUiSat source code/CAD files online.

== Payload ==
EQUiSat's primary payload was a high power LED array, which when flashed appeared on Earth as bright as the North Star. The payload was used to engage those on Earth, especially in pursuit of the project's primary mission, which was to make space more accessible to the public.

The secondary payload was the lithium iron phosphate (LiFePO_{4}) batteries that powered the LEDs. The secondary mission of EQUiSat was to test the viability of LiFePO_{4} batteries, which had never been flown in space, making the batteries more than power storage units but a payload themselves.

== Launch ==
On February 6, 2014, NASA announced that it would launch EQUiSat as part of the CubeSat Launch Initiative (CSLI). EQUiSat launched aboard an International Space Station (ISS) resupply mission on May 21, 2018. It was released into orbit from the ISS on July 13, 2018. EQUiSat was placed into a 400 km altitude orbit at 52˚ inclination.

== Subsystems ==
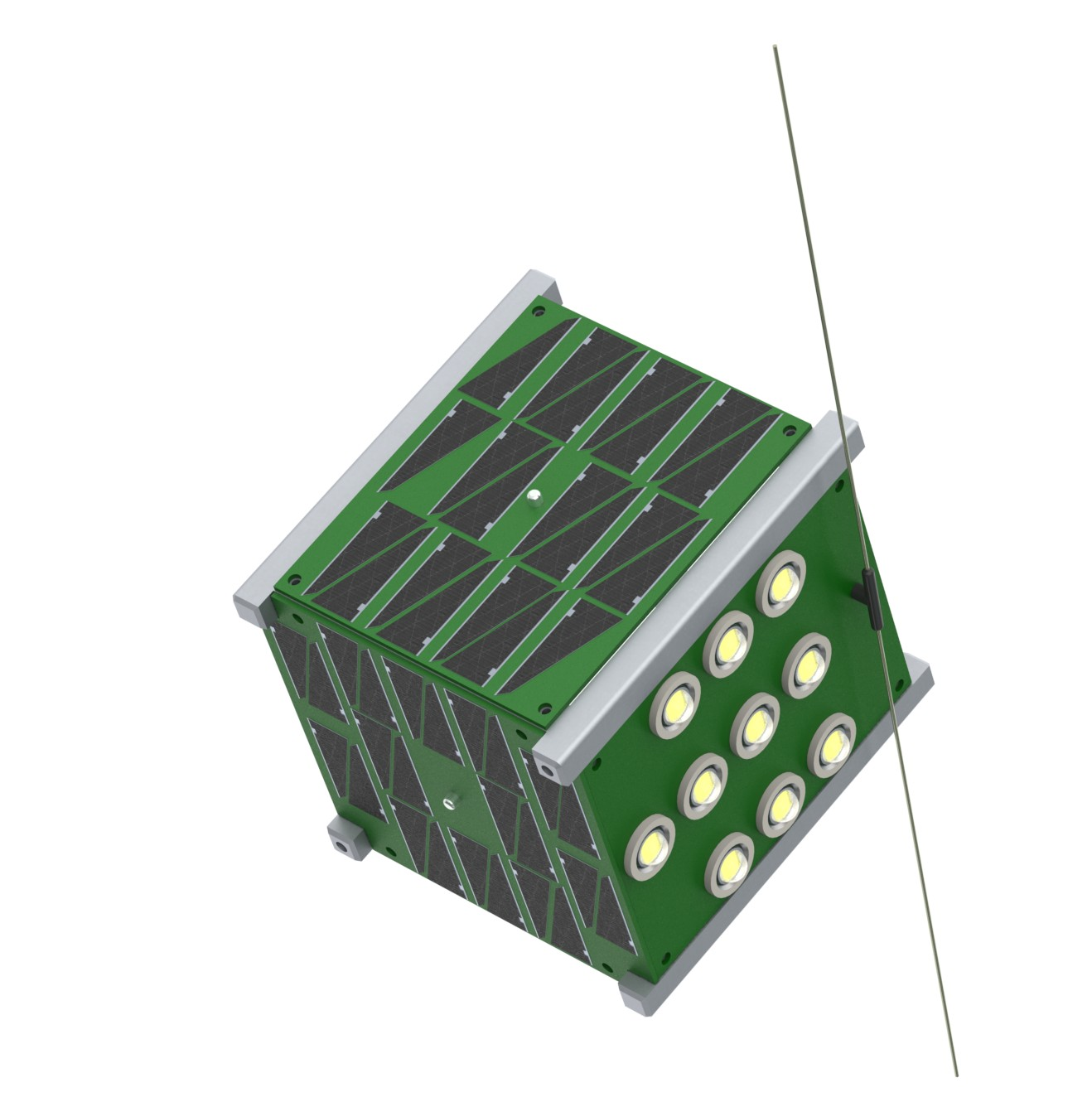
Render of the EQUiSat CubeSat

=== Optical Beacon (Flash) ===
The flash subsystem was an optical beacon allowing those on Earth to visually track EQUiSat after launch. The beacon was an array of four extremely bright LEDs (~10,000 lumens each) that were flashed for 0.1 seconds three times in rapid succession every minute when EQUiSat was in the night sky. The array had an apparent magnitude of 3, approximately the same intensity as Polaris. In order to further increase light intensity for those on Earth, the high power LED array were all on one panel that will be directed towards Earth's northern hemisphere using passive attitude control.

=== Radio ===
A transceiver onboard EQUiSat transmitted a signal in the UHF 70 cm Amateur Radio band at 435-438 MHz, and consisted of a registered call sign beacon and sensor data. The transmissions could be received by amateur radio users, but they were also posted online to increase access for the general public. The radio also acted as a beacon to track the position of the satellite. The primary ground station, built in partnership with Brown's Amateur Radio Club, was the primary point of contact for EQUiSat, and was able to terminate communications with the satellite if necessary.

The antenna was coiled for launch, as CubeSat specification mandates that no satellite parts may protrude from side rails by more than 1 cm before launch. Thus, a deployment system consisting of nylon wire holding the antenna taut was used. This nylon wire was wound around nichrome filaments, which will burn the wire 30 minutes after deployment. The antenna then sprung back into position.

=== Attitude Control ===
EQUiSat used a passive magnetic attitude control system (ACS), which required no reliance on an attitude determination system, no energy drain from torque coils or momentum wheels, and no reliance on the complex algorithms required to de-tumble and stabilize the satellite. Two pairs of hysteresis rods were used to impart a torque on the satellite to offset tumbling brought about by launch from the ISS and the antenna deployment. These hysteresis rods were not only able to impart a torque, but also dampen the transient response of these tumbles as they do so. This will reduce the tumbling over the course of several days. The ACS also makes use of a permanent magnet to align EQUiSat with the Earth's magnetic field. This kept it pointed towards the surface of the Earth in the northern hemisphere.

=== Electronics ===
The electronics subsystem tied together all other subsystems to allow the satellite to function properly. The electronics subsystem consisted of five custom built printed circuit boards (PCBs), each of which were physically stacked inside EQUiSat. The five boards were:

- Flash Panel: The Flash Panel housed the four LEDs, the antenna deployment system, four temperature sensors, an IR sensor and a photodiode.
- LED Driver Board: This board was located directly below the Flash Panel. It contained the four boost regulator circuits, one per LED. These boost regulators draw 60A at 6.6V from the batteries, which was then converted to 36V and 2.7A for the LEDs. It also contained the drive circuitry for the antenna deployment system.
- Battery Board: This board was located in between the two layers of batteries. It contains circuitry that performed Max Power Point Tracking to continuously optimize battery charging based upon the solar panel output. It also had controls for managing battery output and monitoring battery properties.
- Control Board: The Control Board contained the brains of the satellite; including the Atmel SAMD21J18A processor, memory, and demultiplexers that manage incoming data from all other boards. The Control Board also interfaced with the radio, and contains an IMU and a magnetometer.
- Radio Adapter Board: This was a more simple board that provided an interface between the radio and Control Board.

The electronics subsystem was designed, tested and assembled completely in-house, aside from the PCB manufacturing. All components were commercial off-the-shelf, and may be easily purchased online. The PCBs were designed with PCB CAD software and the CAD files are uploaded to GitHub for easy public access.

=== Software ===
The electronics subsystem was backed up with software that ran on the processor. The processor ran a real-time operating system based on FreeRTOS. The usage of a real-time operating system is standard in small embedded systems and allowed EQUiSat to respond to events in a timely, deterministic manner.

The software was responsible for data collection from the sensors mentioned in the electronics subsystem section. It then processed the data having read it from its built-in ADC and transmit data appropriately back down to Earth, which was collected and processed by a Node.js server for real-time monitoring. The software was also able to process incoming transmissions from the primary ground station.

Cosmic radiation provides the possibility of a bit flip while in orbit. This does not pose an issue if a bit in data memory was flipped as it was volatile and thus a reboot of the system solved this. If a bit is flipped in program memory, a watchdog timer triggered a reboot of the system where the program memory was overwritten by a copy stored in radiation-safe MRAM by the bootloader. This watchdog timer was reset to its original value on normal program operation, thus only triggered a reboot if it counted to zero due to a corrupted program.

As for the rest EQUiSat's subsystems, the software files are available online.

=== Power ===
The power system included solar panels for power generation in space and two battery systems for power storage.

The solar panels were produced from scrap gallium arsenide cells using a well documented production process. As a result, they costed 35 times less than comparably powerful off-the-shelf panels. The panels made up 5 sides of the CubeSat, and were made up of varying configuration of Triangular Advanced Solar Cells and TrisolX cells. As a result of the former manufacturer going out of business during development, only the top and bottom panels on EQUiSat contain these cells. The other three panels used the TrisolX cells. 24 cells in a 4S6P configuration, and three side panels contained 20 cells in a 4S5P configuration. The top and bottom panels were designed to output 8.76V at 140–170 mA for an average output power of just over 1.3 W in full sunlight. The other panels output a similar voltage for roughly .5-.7W power.

EQUiSat contained two sets of batteries: one to power the flash system and another to power the radio system and microcontrollers. The batteries that powered the flash were A123 System 18650 LiFePO_{4} cells in a 2S2P configuration. The batteries that powered the radio and microcontroller were two LIR2450 lithium-ion rechargeable coin cell batteries in parallel. EQUiSat alternated between battery systems, with priority going to the LIR2450 batteries first.

=== Structure ===
The chassis and other components were manufactured in-house to maximize cost accessibility. The chassis was milled from a solid block of Al 6061 using a three-axis CNC mill, lathe and taps. This provided the body of EQUiSat and the fastening points for all components. In addition, the block to securely place the six batteries in was milled out of Delrin. Perfecting the manufacturing process was done using machinable wax, to reduce material waste.

The chassis, along with other machined components and the complete assembly, was designed in CAD software. The CNC toolpaths and G-code were produced from these files.

== See also ==
- List of CubeSats
