= DTUsat =

Danish student satellite

DTUsat (COSPAR 2003-031C) was a CubeSat built by students from the Technical University of Denmark. It was launched on 30 June 2003 from the Plesetsk Cosmodrome on a Rockot launcher. Contact with the satellite was never established. As contact was never established, a cause for lack of operation of the satellite could not be determined.

== See also ==
- List of CubeSats
