= Passive Inspection CubeSat =

Technology demonstration cubesat

Passive Inspection CubeSats (PIC-A & PIC-B)
- Mission type: Technology Demonstration
- Operator: Brigham Young University
- COSPAR ID: 2021-002
- Website: BYU Advanced Spacecraft Group

Spacecraft properties
- Spacecraft type: 1U CubeSat each
- Manufacturer: Brigham Young University
- Dry mass: 1.35 kg each
- Power: Solar cells, batteries

Start of mission
- Launch date: 17 Jan 2021 UTC
- Rocket: LauncherOne
- Launch site: Mojave Air and Space Port, California, United States
- Contractor: Virgin Orbit

Orbital parameters
- Reference system: Geocentric
- Regime: Low Earth
- Pericircular altitude: 500 km
- Apocircular altitude: 500 km
- Inclination: 60.69

Passive Inspection CubeSats, or PICS, is a technology demonstration spacecraft mission utilizing two CubeSat miniaturized satellites, identified as PIC-A and PIC-B. The project was developed by students at Brigham Young University (BYU) as part of NASA's Educational Launch of Nanosatellites (ELaNA) initiative beginning in 2016. The satellites are outfitted with cameras to be able to get a 360-degree view to visually assess the exterior of other spacecraft and detect possible damage. BYU professor David Long termed the project a "spacecraft selfie cam."

PIC-A and PIC-B were originally scheduled to be launched in 2018, but launch was delayed until 2021. PICs was successfully launched into orbit along with eight other CubeSats during Virgin Orbit's Launch Demo 2 on January 17, 2021. In Virgin Orbit's first successful air-launch-to-orbit, the Boeing 747-400 Cosmic Girl carried a LauncherOne orbital rocket from Mojave Air and Space Port to the Pacific Ocean, where LauncherOne separated from the aircraft and achieved orbit.

== See also ==
- List of CubeSats
- Educational Launch of Nanosatellites
