= Haute École de la Province de Liège =

In 2007, the three Belgian Hautes Ecoles (Colleges) of the Province of Liège (Léon-Eli Troclet, André Vésale and Rennequin Sualem) came together in a single large ensemble called Haute Ecole de la Province de Liège (HEPL).

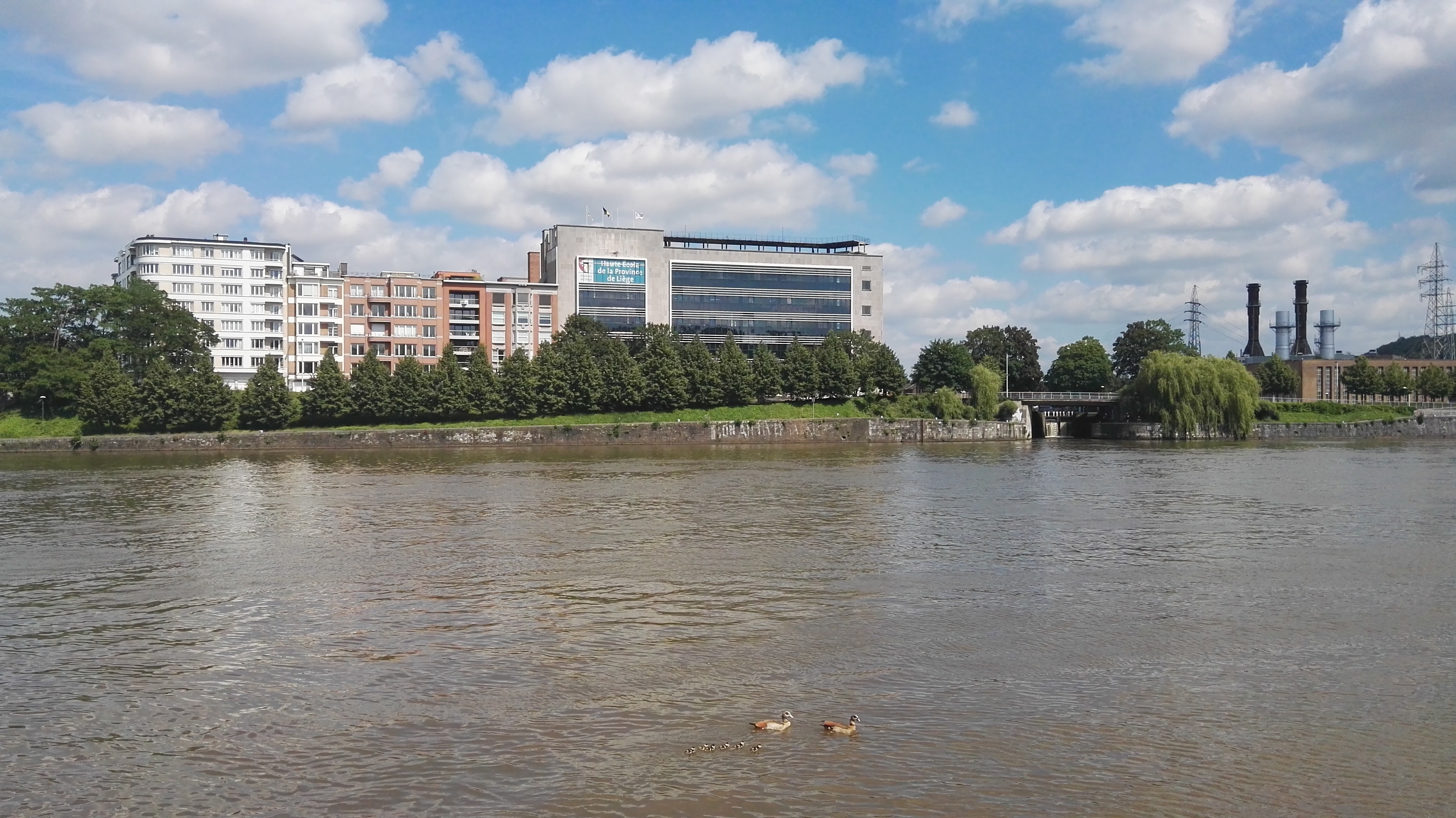
Haute École de la Province de Liège — Technical category — Gloesener campus

This college delivers different bachelor's and master's degrees in the following categories:

- Technical: master in science in industrial engineering in chemistry, bio-chemistry, electronics, computer science, electro-mechanics, construction, land surveyor; bachelor in computer science and system, graphical techniques, electro-mechanics, construction, chemistry, industrial science.
- Agronomic
- Economics
- Paramedics
- Educational
- Social

== See also ==
- List of colleges and universities by country
