= CesiumAstro =

American satellite communications and aerospace technology company

- Company type: Private
- Industry: Aerospace engineering
- Founded: 2017; 9 years ago
- Founder: Shey Sabripour
- Headquarters: Austin, Texas, U.S.
- Website: cesiumastro.com

CesiumAstro is an Austin, Texas based startup specializing in phased array technology. The company is building antennas and communications systems for satellites.

CesiumAstro was founded in 2017 by Shey Sabripour.

== History ==
The company completed a $12.4 million Series A funding round in March 2019. In 2020, CesiumAstro expanded its capabilities by opening a spacecraft design and engineering facility in Broomfield, Colorado.

In January 2023, CesiumAstro acquired TXMission, a UK-based developer of software-defined radios and modems, broadening the technology portfolio and establishing a European presence.

In June 2024, CesiumAstro secured an additional $65 million in a Series B+ investment round led by Trousdale Ventures, with participation from the Development Bank of Japan and Quanta Computer, Inc. This brought the company's total equity raised since its founding to $156 million. The proceeds were allocated to scaling R&D, manufacturing, and global operations as the company responded to increased demand for its phased-array communications payloads.

In July 2024 it was awarded a contract by NASA’s Marshall Space Flight Center (MSFC) to deliver radio units for lunar navigation (LunaNet Technology).

== Product Portfolio ==
CesiumAstro specializes in the development of advanced phased array antenna systems, software-defined radios (SDRs), and multi-beam, reconfigurable communications modules tailored for a wide range of platforms including CubeSats, small satellites, and larger aerospace vehicles. CesiumAstro integrates commercial off-the-shelf (COTS) components with in-house vertically integrated manufacturing, allowing for scalable production and rapid adaptation to customer requirements.

== Notable Contracts ==
In July 2024, the company was awarded a contract by NASA's Marshall Space Flight Center to develop and deliver advanced radio units compatible with the LunaNet Augmented Forward Signal (AFS) standard, intended to support lunar navigation infrastructure for Artemis-era missions.

The company won contracts to supply software-defined radio (SDR) payloads and ground user terminals for Taiwan's first national LEO communications satellite constellation, part of the Beyond 5G (B5G) initiative, delivering its Vireo Ka active phased-array payload for the space segment and Skylark terminals for user access.

CesiumAstro is a key supplier to the Space Development Agency's (SDA) proliferated satellite architecture. The company provided its Vireo Ka-band multi-beam phased array payloads for Raytheon's Tranche 1 Tracking Layer satellites and was selected by Rocket Lab to deliver the Vireo advanced RF payloads integrated into 18 satellites as part of the SDA's Tranche 2 Transport Layer constellation.
