= Damping and Vibrations Experiment =

Satellite testing tungsten metal dampening

The Damping and Vibrations Experiment (DAVE), also known as CP-7, is a technology demonstration nanosatellite developed by the PolySat laboratory at California Polytechnic State University, San Luis Obispo, in collaboration with Northrop Grumman. The spacecraft adheres to the 1U CubeSat standard and is currently in a 93° inclination orbit. DAVE will study the vibration of metal beams damped with tungsten particles in a micro-gravity environment. The test elements are driven by a piezoelectric actuator, and vibration data is collected via an accelerometer at the tip of each beam. DAVE was launched into a high-inclination orbit as a secondary payload on the final flight of the Delta II launch vehicle as part of the ELaNa-18 ride-share mission with NASA's ICESat-2 primary payload. The launch occurred out of Vandenberg Air Force Base, California on September 15 at 6:02 AM local time. DAVE was deployed alongside three other CubeSat spacecraft: University of Central Florida's SurfSat, and two ELFIN spacecraft from University of California, Los Angeles.

As of November 2018, the spacecraft was active and in good health.

== Design ==
DAVE is a 1U CubeSat spacecraft, measuring approximately 10x10x11cm. The spacecraft was integrated into a PPOD (Poly Picosatellite Orbital Deployer) alongside the University of Central Florida's SurfSat. Fixed solar panels on the sides of the spacecraft provide power to the avionics and transmitter. DAVE is operated from UHF ground stations at California Polytechnic State University.

As the satellite's experiment is contained entirely within the spacecraft and does not require any external influence (other than the existence of the low-Earth orbit environment), DAVE contains no attitude control system. A deployable UHF dipole antenna was used to provide fairly omnidirectional coverage, negating the need for spacecraft pointing.

== Payload ==
DAVE contains three aluminum beams which will be used to study the effects of microgravity on vibration damping. Each beam contains a mass on the tip which is attached to an accelerometer, used to identify the resonance peaks of each beam. One beam acts as an undamped control system, while the other two beams contain two types of tungsten particle dampers. Each beam is driven by a high-voltage piezoelectric element over a range of frequencies. The data from the vibration payload can be used to potentially develop systems to dampen out harmful vibrations on future spacecraft. Payload data is downlinked from the spacecraft and processed on the ground.

== Amateur radio beacon ==
DAVE transmits a radio beacon on the amateur 70-centimeter band to allow ham radio operators to track and monitor the satellite. The beacon has been received and decoded by amateur radio operators internationally. The spacecraft transmits a periodic radio packet on 437.150 MHz, which contains sensor telemetry recorded just prior to the transmitter turning on. The beacon contains information from various sensors including temperature sensors, a magnetoresistive magnetometer, and voltage sensors on various electronics.
