= Katherine Johnson Independent Verification and Validation Facility =

NASA software engineering facility

Coordinates: 39°25′48″N 80°11′52″W

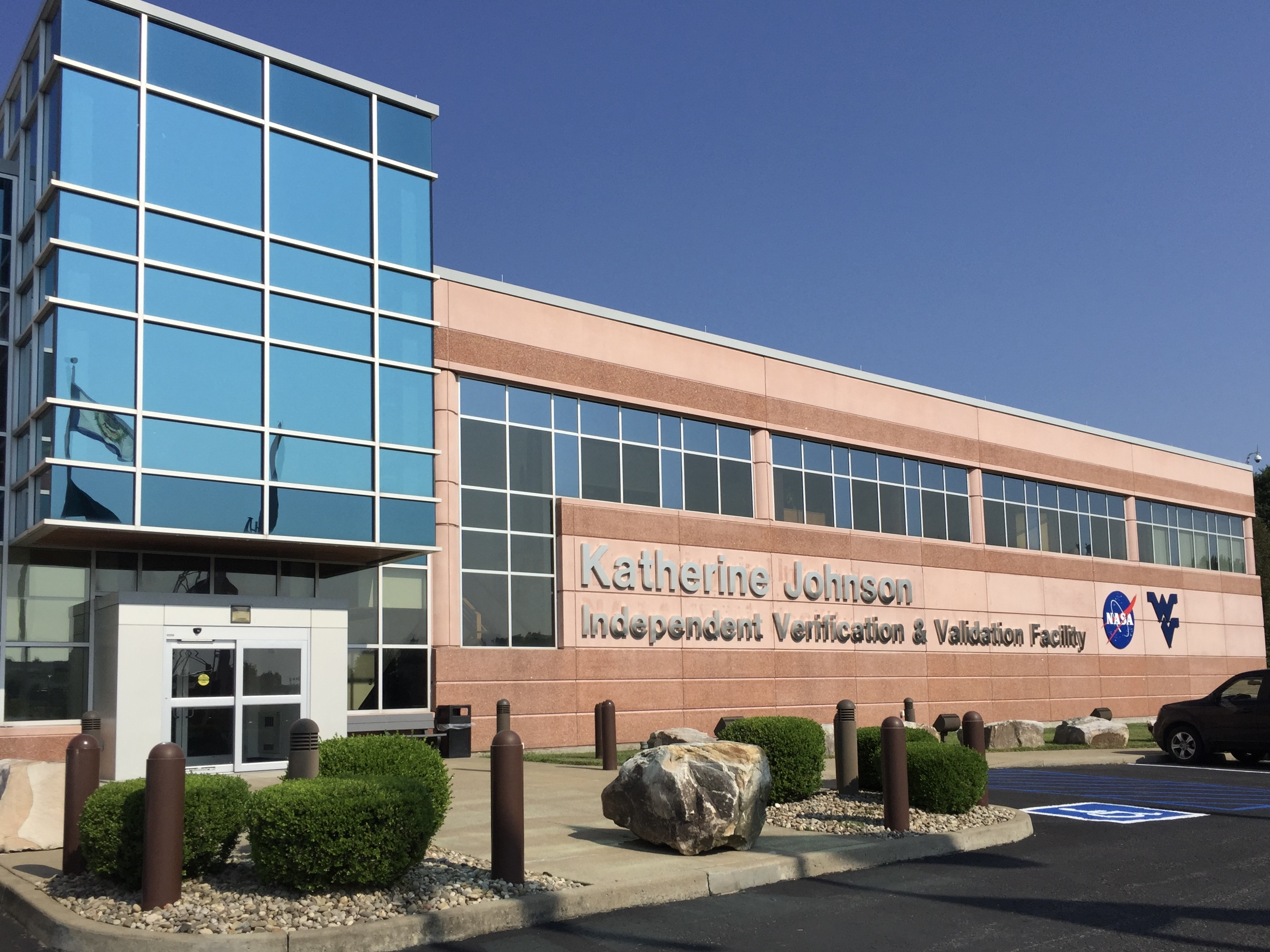
- The main entrance to the Katherine Johnson Independent Verification and Validation Facility

Agency overview
- Formed: 1993
- Headquarters: Fairmont, West Virginia
- Employees: 270
- Agency executive: Wes Deadrick, director
- Parent agency: Goddard Space Flight Center (NASA)
- Website: nasa.gov/katherine-johnson-ivv-facility/

The Katherine Johnson Independent Verification and Validation Facility is a NASA facility in Fairmont, West Virginia, housing the agency's Independent Verification and Validation (IV&V) program, which supports the verification and validation of mission-critical software. Established in 1993 following recommendations from the National Research Council and the Presidential Commission into the Space Shuttle Challenger disaster, the program provides independent systems engineering and analysis to identify defects, reduce development costs, and mitigate risks in safety- and mission-critical systems. The IV&V program operates under the Office of Safety and Mission Assurance (OSMA) and is administratively part of Goddard Space Flight Center.

In 2022, the program consolidated its operations and approximately 250 personnel into a single facility to reduce costs and eliminate leased office space. The facility is named for Katherine Johnson, a West Virginia–born mathematician whose work at NASA was critical to early human spaceflight programs and was featured in the 2016 film Hidden Figures.

== Projects ==
NASA's IV&V Program provides independent verification and validation support for a range of NASA missions and programs.

- Artemis – A lunar exploration program focused on human and robotic missions to the Moon.
- Dragonfly – A rotorcraft mission to Saturn's moon Titan to study its chemistry and habitability.
- Exploration Ground Systems – Ground infrastructure used to process and launch spacecraft for NASA exploration missions.
- Extravehicular Activity and Human Surface Mobility – Development of spacesuits and surface mobility systems for use on the Moon.
- Human Landing System – Lunar landers developed to transport astronauts between lunar orbit and the surface.
- International Space Station – A space-based research laboratory in low Earth orbit.
- Nancy Grace Roman Space Telescope – A space telescope for astrophysics and exoplanet research.
- Orion – A crewed spacecraft designed for deep-space missions.
- Space Launch System – A heavy-lift launch vehicle used for Artemis missions.
- US Deorbit Vehicle – A spacecraft being developed to deorbit the International Space Station at the end of its service life.

== Jon McBride Software Testing and Research (JSTAR) ==
The Jon McBride Software Testing and Research (JSTAR) group is a subdivision of NASA's IV&V Program within the Independent Verification and Validation office. It is named after West Virginia–born astronaut Jon McBride. JSTAR develops advanced digital twin simulations of embedded spacecraft environments, enabling software to be tested and validated under conditions that cannot be replicated using physical hardware alone. These software-based simulation environments allow NASA to accelerate development timelines, expand testing coverage, and reduce costs by minimizing reliance on physical test systems. By supporting close collaboration with mission software developers, JSTAR helps improve the robustness and resilience of safety- and mission-critical spacecraft software.

== Mission Protection Services (MPS) ==
IV&V Mission Protection Services (MPS) include software security risk assessment, mission and system cybersecurity assessment and threat research, and verification and validation of space and ground software security control implementations. Through collaboration with agency leadership and mission directorate stakeholders, a complimentary capability is leveraged to uncover design and operational security concerns through engagement in system/software engineering forums.
