= ExoCube (CP-10) =

Space weather satellite

EXOCUBE
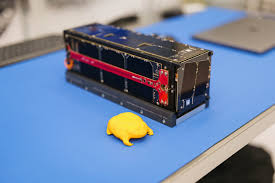
- Operator: NASA/JPL, Cal Poly Picosatellite Project (PolySat)
- COSPAR ID: 2015-003E
- SATCAT no.: 40380
- Distance travelled: 669 km

Spacecraft properties
- Manufacturer: NASA/JPL, Cal Poly Picosatellite Project (PolySat)

Start of mission
- Launch date: 31-01-2015

Orbital parameters
- Semi-major axis: 6609 km
- Periapsis altitude: 234.5 km
- Apoapsis altitude: 242.8 km
- Inclination: 99.1º
- Period: 89.1 minutes

Cargo
- Mass: 4 kg

ExoCube (CP-10) is a space weather satellite developed by the California Polytechnic State University – San Luis Obispo and sponsored by the National Science Foundation. It is one of many miniaturized satellites that adhere to the CubeSat standard. ExoCube's primary mission is to measure the density of hydrogen, oxygen, helium, and nitrogen in the Earth's exosphere. It is characterizing [O], [H], [He], [N2], [O+], [H+], [He+], [NO+], as well as the total ion density above ground stations, incoherent scatter radar (ISR) stations, and periodically throughout the entire orbit. It was launched aboard a Delta II rocket with the NASA SMAP primary payload from Vandenberg AFB in California on January 31, 2015.

== Design ==
ExoCube is a 3-U CubeSat satellite (30 x 10 x 10 cm). ExoCube was deployed from a P-POD (Poly-Picosatellite Orbital Deployer), a universal CubeSat deployment system. The satellite is equipped with an Environmental Chamber for the scientific payload and an Attitude Determination Control System (ADCS).

The satellite's Environmental Chamber is the housing for the two scientific instruments, a miniaturized mass spectrometer, and an ion sensor. The chamber secures the instruments and provides the necessary conditions for accurate data acquisition. It also serves to keep moisture away from the instrument pre-launch. The chamber is purged with sulfur hexafluoride while awaiting the launch date for the instrument's protection.

ExoCube is also equipped with an attitude control system that allows for instrumental positioning and satellite stability. For control, ExoCube is fitted with two deployable booms with brass masses located at their ends. This allows for gravity-gradient stabilization that helps align the satellite into the proper orientation in two axes within ±10°. Further fine-tuning of the satellite's orientation is performed by magnetorquers. These devices utilize generated magnetic fields from a current, which interact with the Earth's magnetic field to orientate the satellite. This will allow the satellite's scientific payload to take proper measurements. The satellite also has a 10-mNm momentum wheel from Sinclair Interplanetary that provides roll and yaw axes coupling for gyroscopic stability. For determination, ExoCube is equipped with magnetometers and Sun sensors on each of its faces, as well as on the deployable booms.

== Mission ==
ExoCube is a joint effort operation being developed by Scientific Solutions, NASA Goddard, California Polytechnic State University – San Luis Obispo, University of Wisconsin and University of Illinois. The ExoCube project began in 2011. The satellite's bus design and construction was awarded to PolySat at the California Polytechnic State University in San Luis Obispo. NASA Goddard Space Flight Center provided the sensor payload, a time of flight mass spectrometer. The science team consisting of The University of Wisconsin – Madison, the University of Illinois at Urbana–Champaign and Scientific Solutions is responsible for the collection, calibration and interpretation of the mission data. As lead institution Scientific Solutions, Inc (SSI) is responsible for program management and oversight.

ExoCube was one of four secondary payloads on ELaNa-X SMAP, launched on 31 January 2015. The satellite has a polar orbit of approximately 400 x 670 km altitude and 98 degree inclination. ExoCube will have an expected orbital lifetime of 8 years with an expected minimum mission life of 6 months.

Communication with ExoCube are through the UHF Marconi Ground Station, which is located at California Polytechnic State University– San Luis Obispo.

== Scientific data and payload ==
ExoCube will acquire global knowledge of the in-situ densities of [O], [H], [He], [N2], [O+], [H+], [He+], [NO+] in the upper ionosphere and lower exosphere. Key scientific objectives include investigation of upper atmospheric global, diurnal, and seasonal variability, charge exchange processes, atmospheric response to geomagnetic storms, and validation of empirical and climatological atmospheric models. The satellite uses a gated time-of-flight spectrometer.

Atomic Oxygen and Helium have not been measured in-situ since the early 1980s during the era of the Dynamics Explorer. Hydrogen has never been directly measured in-situ over the mission region. By providing measurements over Arecibo, Wisconsin, Kitt Peak, and Cerro Tololo, ExoCube will aid in the inter-comparison and validation of ground-based observations from the respective sites. These measurements are performed using passive optical interferometry and photometry of neutral airglow emissions as well as active ISR to characterize the local ionosphere.

The density measurements will also be used to characterize the climatology of the upper ionosphere and lower exospheric composition. Having the orbital inclination and precision capabilities of ExoCube will enable a robust assessment of the diurnal density and composition variations. The expected minimum six-month mission lifetime will allow for comparisons between equinox and solstice conditions.

The scientific payload includes two instruments that are collectively referred to as EXOS. The instruments are the Neutral Static Energy Angle Analyzer (NSEAA), the Ion Static Energy Analyzer (ISEAA), and the Total Ion Monitor (TIM). The scientific payload that is performing the experimental measurement acquisition was supplied by NASA-GSFC. The University of Wisconsin – Madison is performing tests and analysis on the acquired data.
