= Deimos =

Deimos, a Greek word for dread, may refer to:

== In general ==
- Deimos (deity), one of the sons of Ares and Aphrodite in Greek mythology
- Deimos (moon), the smaller and outermost of Mars' two natural satellites

== Fictional characters ==
- Deimos (character), a villain in DC Comics
- Deimos, the brother of Kratos in the God of War series
- Deimos, the identity of an antagonistic character from the 2018 video game Assassin's Creed Odyssey
- Deimos, the protagonist in Tom Clancy's Rainbow Six Siege
- Deimos, stage name of the drummer of Nocturna
- Deimos Kiriakis, a fictional character on the television series Days of Our Lives

== Transportation and vehicles ==
- Elecnor Deimos, a Spanish aerospace company
- Deimos-1, an artificial Earth observation satellite
- Deimos-2, an artificial Earth observation satellite
- SpaceX Deimos, a floating Starship launch and landing platform
- USS Deimos, a U.S. Navy ship name
  - USS Deimos (AK-78), a ship in the US Navy in World War II

== Other uses ==
- DEIMOS, an early message passing OS for the Cray-1, replaced by the Cray Time Sharing System
- Deimos (Doctor Who audio), an audio drama

== See also ==
- Demos (disambiguation)
- Demoz (disambiguation)
