= Deimos Imaging =

Spanish satellite imaging company

Deimos Imaging S.L.U.
- Company type: Private company
- Industry: Space
- Genre: Satellite Products and Services Provider
- Founded: 2006
- Founder: Deimos Space, LATUV
- Defunct: 2021
- Successor: GEOSAT
- Headquarters: Boecillo, Valladolid, Spain
- Area served: The entire world
- Key people: Fabrizio Pirondini, Executive Chairman
- Products: Satellite Imagery, Value Added Products
- Number of employees: 65 (2015)
- Parent: Urthecast
- Website: http://www.deimos-imaging.com

Deimos Imaging is a Spanish company which operates a complete Remote Sensing system. The system comprises the satellites Deimos-1 and Deimos-2, the ground stations at Boecillo near Valladolid and Puertollano near Ciudad Real, the reception hardware hosted at KSAT, Svalbard, and Inuvik and kiruna at SSC and an image processing laboratory with generation of agricultural and environment products also at Boecillo.

Deimos-1 satellite has been operational since its launch on 29 July 2009 and the company has been commercializing imagery ever since. The goal of the company is to provide imagery data globally at the highest quality standards. 19 June 2014, Deimos-2 was launched as well.
