= Live at Roadburn 2008 =

Live at Roadburn 2008 may refer to:

- Live at Roadburn 2008 (Wolves in the Throne Room album)
- Live at Roadburn 2008 (Year of No Light album)
