= Demo =

Demo, usually short for demonstration, may refer to:

== Music and film ==
- Demo (music), a song typically recorded for reference rather than for release
- Demo (Behind Crimson Eyes), a 2004 recording by the band Behind Crimson Eyes
- Demo (Deafheaven album), a 2010 EP by Deafheaven
- Demo (The Flatliners album), a 2002 album by the band The Flatliners
- Demo (Miss May I album), a 2008 recording by the metalcore band Miss May I
- "Demo", a 1990 single by Die Krupps
- "Demo" (P-Model song), a 1979 recording by songwriters Susumu Hirasawa and Yasumi Tanaka
- Demo (Skinless), a 1994 recording by the band Skinless
- Demo 2004 (Year of No Light album), a 2004 recording by Year of No Light
- Demo #2, an unreleased recording by Neutral Milk Hotel
- Demo, 2008 debut EP by Malaysian singer Yuna
- Demo, 2018 album by Sezen Aksu

== Computing and technology ==
- Demo (computer programming), a multimedia spectacle of programming skill
- The Demo, a computer demonstration in 1968, sometimes called "the mother of all demos"
- DEMOnstration Power Plant (DEMO), a proposed nuclear fusion power plant
- Design & Engineering Methodology for Organizations (DEMO), an enterprise modelling methodology
- Demo mode, a feature often found in consumer electronics
- Game demo, a freely-distributed version of a video game
- Game replay, or demo, a recording of a video game which is played back within the game's engine
- Technology demo, a prototype version of a technology product

== People ==
- Demo (ancient Greek poet) (fl. c. AD 200), ancient Greek poet
- Demo (zsnes), one of the authors of the ZSNES software emulator
- Demo Cates, Canadian musician; see Juno Awards of 1985
- dEmo (artist), Spanish artist (born 1960)
- Grillo Demo, Argentine artist

== Other uses ==
- Demo (comics), a comic book series by Brian Wood and Becky Cloonan
- A short form of Demonstration (protest)
- Demonstration (teaching), teaching by reason or proof using examples or experiments
- Product demonstration, a sales or marketing presentation
- Demolition, the destruction of buildings and other structures
- Exhibition game, a sporting event with no competitive value to any competitor
- DEMOs, a business process design methodology by Jan Dietz
- Demo, a daughter of the gods Celeus and Metaneira
- DEMO conference, held annually by IDG for new technology products
- d.e.m.o., a defunct clothing store owned by PacSun
- Demoman, one of the nine playable classes in Team Fortress 2
- Democratic Party, a shorthand used for various political parties
  - Democratic Party (United States)

== See also ==
- Demoware, software that users can test in a limited fashion before buying
- Demographics, quantifiable statistics of a given population
- Demoscene, a computer art subculture that specializes in producing demos
- Demos (disambiguation)
- Democrat (disambiguation)
- Demolition (disambiguation)
- Demonstration (disambiguation)
