= Instruction =

Instruction is a request or order to perform a task or carry out a procedure, or a description of how to perform a task or procedure.

It may also refer to:

== Law ==
- Jury instructions, also known as charges or directions, are a set of legal guidelines given by a judge to a jury in a court of law

== Music ==
- Instruction (band), a 2002 rock band from New York City, US
- "Instruction" (song), a 2017 song by English DJ Jax Jones
- Instructions (album), a 2001 album by Jermaine Dupri

== Other uses ==
- Direct instruction, a process that involves teaching a skill set to students through lectures or demonstrations.
- Instruction, teaching or education performed by a teacher
- Instruction, the pre-trial phase of an investigation led by a judge in an inquisitorial system of justice
- Instruction manual, an instructional book or booklet
  - Instruction manual (gaming), a booklet that instructs the player on how to play the game
- Instruction set, defines the instructions supported for a computer architecture

== See also ==
- Command (disambiguation)
- Computer program, a collection of instructions
- Instructor (disambiguation)
- Sebayt, a work of the ancient Egyptian didactic literature aiming to teach ethical behavior
