= Demos =

Demos is a Greek term referring to the ruling body of free citizens in ancient Greek city-states (like Athens), and as such is the primary root of the word "democracy".

Demos, DEMOS, or The Demos may also refer to:

== Organizations ==
- Demos (UK think tank), London-based public policy research organisation and publisher
- Demos (U.S. think tank), a public policy research and advocacy organization
- DEMOS (Republika Srpska), a political party in Bosnia and Herzegovina
- DEMOS (Montenegro), a Montenegrin political party
- DEMOS (Slovenia), a Slovenian coalition of political parties
- Demos Helsinki, a think tank in Finland
- Solidary Democracy, a political party in Italy
- Democracy and Solidarity Party, a political party in Romania

== Arts and entertainment ==
- Demos (film), a 1921 silent drama movie
- Demos (novel), an 1886 novel by George Gissing

=== Music ===
- Demos, 1982-86, a set of recordings by Swedish pop artist Per Gessle
- Demos (Crosby, Stills & Nash album), 2009
- Demos (Edith Frost album), 2004
- Demos (Imperial Drag album), 2005
- Demos (Matt Skiba album), 2010
- The Demos (Jess Moskaluke album), 2021
- The Demos (Rebecca Hollweg album), 1999
- The Demos (Father John Misty EP), 2012
- Cowboys from Hell: The Demos, by Pantera
- Unlabeled - The Demos, 2006 EP by Leah Andreone

== Computing ==
- DEMOS, a Soviet Unix-like operating system
- DEMOS (ISP), the first internet service provider in the USSR
- Demos Commander, an Orthodox File Manager for Unix-like systems

== People ==
- Demos Chiang (born 1976), Taiwanese businessman
- Demos Goumenos (born 1978), Cypriot football midfielder
- Demos Shakarian (1913–1993), Christian businessman of Armenian origin from Los Angeles
- George Demos (born 1976), former U.S. Securities and Exchange Commission prosecutor, and former congressional candidate

== Other uses ==
- Deme or demos, a suburb or subdivision in ancient Greece
  - Dímoi (singular: dímos), municipalities of Greece
  - See § Demos as personification for the quasi-deity
- Demos Medical Publishing, a publisher of books on medical subjects

== See also ==
- The Demos Remastered: Anthology 1, a Black 'n Blue compilation album
- Eindhovense Studentenvereniging Demos, a student association in the Netherlands
- Demo (disambiguation)
- Deimos (disambiguation)
- Demoz (disambiguation)
