= Deimos-1 =

Spanish Earth imaging satellite

- Mission type: Optical imaging Disaster monitoring
- Operator: Deimos Imaging
- COSPAR ID: 2009-041A
- SATCAT no.: 35681
- Mission duration: Five years

Spacecraft properties
- Bus: SSTL-100
- Manufacturer: SSTL
- Launch mass: 91 kilograms (201 lb)

Start of mission
- Launch date: 29 July 2009, 18:46 UTC
- Rocket: Dnepr
- Launch site: Baikonur 109/95
- Contractor: ISC Kosmotras

Orbital parameters
- Reference system: Geocentric
- Regime: Sun-synchronous

Deimos-1 is a Spanish Earth imaging satellite which is operated by Deimos Imaging who commercializes its imagery directly but also has distribution agreements with other entities like Astrium GEO and DMC International Imaging.

== History ==
It was constructed by Surrey Satellite Technology for Elecnor Deimos, representing the first Spanish Earth observation satellite and the first private one in Europe. It is based on the SSTL-100 satellite bus. Deimos-1 was launched into a 686-kilometre (426 mi) Sun-synchronous low Earth orbit. The launch was conducted by ISC Kosmotras, who used a Dnepr carrier rocket, with DubaiSat-1 as the primary payload. Deimos-1, along with the UK-DMC 2, Nanosat 1B, AprizeSat-3 and AprizeSat-4 satellites, were launched as secondary payloads. The rocket was launched at 18:46 GMT on 29 July 2009, from Site 109/95 at the Baikonur Cosmodrome in Kazakhstan.

The satellite was purchased from Elecnor Deimos by Urthecast in 2015, together with Deimos-2 and Deimos Imaging, the division of the Spanish company that was in charge of the operation of both satellites.

In 2021, following the acquisition of Deimos Imaging's assets by GEOSAT, the satellite was renamed GEOSAT-1.

== Optical instrument ==
The satellite has an expected lifetime of five years. It carries a multi-spectral imager with a resolution of 22 metres (72 ft) and 600 kilometres (370 mi) of swath, operating in green, red and near infrared spectra.

== Advantages ==
These optical satellite images open new perspectives to users of this satellite for the development of services & applications in various markets such as Maritime, Agriculture, Environment or Forestry.

- Fast coverage of territories thanks to its wide swath
- Near-real-time capacity
- Competitive price

== See also ==
- 2009 in spaceflight
