= Demonstration =

Demonstration may refer to:

- Demonstration (acting), part of the Brechtian approach to acting
- Demonstration (military), an attack or show of force on a front where a decision is not sought
- Protest, a public act of objection, disapproval or dissent
  - Political demonstration, a political rally or protest
- Demonstration (teaching), a method of teaching by example rather than simple explanation
- Demonstration (learning), imitation by observing a demonstration example
- Demonstration Hall, a building on the Michigan State University campus
- Mathematical proof
- Product demonstration, a sales or marketing presentation such as a:
  - Technology demonstration, an incomplete version of product to showcase idea, performance, method or features of the product
- Scientific demonstration, a scientific experiment to illustrate principles
- Wolfram Demonstrations Project, a repository of computer based educational demonstrations

== Music ==
- Demonstration (Landon Pigg album), 2002
- Demonstration (Tinie Tempah album), 2013
- Demonstrations EP, the first EP by We Came As Romans
- Demonstrate (song), a song by JoJo

== Sports ==
- Demonstration sport, a sport which is played to promote it, most commonly during the Olympic Games
- Exhibition game, a sporting event with no competitive value to any competitor

== See also ==
- Demonstration effect, effects on the behavior of individuals caused by observation of others
- Demonstration farm, a farm which is used primarily to demonstrate agricultural techniques
- Demonstration of force, the show of armed forces and their capabilities
- Demo (disambiguation)
- Demonstrator (disambiguation)
