= Deimos-2 =

Spanish Earth observation satellite

Deimos-2 / GEOSAT-2
- Mission type: Remote sensing
- Operator: GEOSAT
- COSPAR ID: 2014-033D
- SATCAT no.: 40013
- Website: geosat.space
- Mission duration: 7 years

Spacecraft properties
- Bus: SI-300
- Manufacturer: Satrec Initiative
- Launch mass: ≈310 kilograms (680 lb)
- Dimensions: 1,200 by 1,200 millimetres (47 in × 47 in) (Hexagonal)
- Power: 330 watts

Start of mission
- Launch date: June 19, 2014, 19:11 UTC
- Rocket: Dnepr
- Launch site: Dombarovsky 370/13
- Contractor: Kosmotras

Orbital parameters
- Reference system: Geocentric
- Regime: Sun-Synchronous
- Perigee altitude: 597 kilometres (371 mi)
- Apogee altitude: 617 kilometres (383 mi)
- Inclination: 97.9 degrees
- Epoch: 27 June 2014

Main camera
- Name: DMAC
- Wavelengths: Pan: 420-720 nm MS1: 420-510 nm (Blue); MS2: 510-580 nm (Green); MS3: 600-720 nm (Red); MS4: 760-890 nm (Near Infrared)
- Resolution: 0.75 metres (2 ft 6 in) (Pan); 5 metres (16 ft) (MS)

Deimos-2 is a Spanish remote sensing Earth observation satellite built for Elecnor Deimos under an agreement with Satrec Initiative, a satellite manufacturing company in South Korea.

The Earth observation system was developed by Elecnor Deimos, who managed the engineering, ground segment, integration, tests, launch contract and LEOP, in collaboration with Satrec Initiative, who provided the platform and the payload. The platform is based on DubaiSat-2 launched in 2013, with a larger battery pack intended to last for at least 7 years. The satellite was purchased by Urthecast in 2015, together with Deimos-1 and Deimos Imaging, the division of Elecnor Deimos that was in charge of the operation of both satellites.

Deimos-2 was owned by Deimos Imaging, who operated and commercialises its data. In 2021, the company GEOSAT acquired Deimos-1 & 2, and renamed them to GEOSAT-1 & 2, respectively.

== See also ==
- 2014 in spaceflight
