= Demoz =

Demoz may refer to:

- Demoz (rapper), rapper in the supergroup Army of the Pharaohs
- Demoz (album), a 1999 album by Marcella Detroit
- Demoz, an LP included in the 20th anniversary super deluxe box set of Gorillaz (album)

== See also ==
- Deimos (disambiguation)
- Demo (disambiguation)
- Demos (disambiguation)
