= Ausserwelt =

Studio album by Year of No Light
- Released: 26 April 2010
- Recorded: Bordeaux, September 2009
- Genre: Post-metal, post-rock, sludge metal
- Length: 48:02
- Label: Conspiracy Records (core089); Music Fear Satan (MUF009)
- Producer: Year of No Light

Year of No Light chronology
Karysun / Year of No Light (2009)	Ausserwelt (2010)	Tocscin (2013)

Professional ratings
Review scores
Source	Rating
AllMusic	4.5/5 stars

Ausserwelt is the second studio album by French post-metal band Year of No Light, released in 2010. It was originally released by Conspiracy Records (CD) and Music Fear Satan (2xLP).

== Track listing ==
All tracks are written by Year of No Light

No.	Title	Length
1.	"Perséphone (Enna)"	11:56
2.	"Perséphone (Coré)"	9:37
3.	"Hiérophante"	13:17
4.	"Abbesse"	13:12
Total length:		48:02

== Personnel ==
Year of No Light

- Jérôme Alban – guitar
- Pierre Anouilh – guitar
- Bertrand Sébenne – drums, keyboards
- Johan Sébenne – bass, keyboards, electronics
- Shiran Kaïdine – guitar
- Mathieu Mégemont – drums, keyboards, synthesizer

Technical personnel

- Cyrille Gachet – engineering and mixing
- Alan Douches – mastering
- Greg Vezon – album art and design
