= Academic ranks in Egypt =

Academic ranks in Egypt are the titles, relative importance and power of professors, researchers, and administrative personnel held in academia.

== Overview ==
- MOA'ED (معيد), or teaching assistant- also called demonstrator- (must have a bachelor's degree; usually graduated top of the class)
- MODARESS MOSAED (مدرس مساعد), Assistant lecturer (must have a master's degree)
- MODARESS (مدرس), Assistant professor (must have a PhD degree)
- OSTATH MOSAED (the "TH" pronounced like in the word "THE") MOSAED (أستاذ مساعد), equivalent to Associate professor
- OSTATH (أستاذ) (the "TH" pronounced like in the word "THE"), equivalent to professor (usually after minimum of five years serving as OSTATH MOSAED as well as publishing certain number of research papers)
- OSTATH MOTAFAREGH (أستاذ متفرغ), equivalent to professor emeritus

== Professorship ==
Public universities have five ranks for faculty members: معيد (Mu`īd; equivalent to teaching assistant), مدرس مساعد (Mudarris musā`id; equivalent to lecturer), مدرس(Mudarris; equivalent to assistant professor), أستاذ مساعد('Ustāḏ musā`id; equivalent to associate professor), and أستاذ('Ustāḏ; equivalent to professor)

Teaching assistant: Academic departments hire teaching assistants by either directly hiring the top ranking students of the most recent graduates, or publishing advertisements. Once hired, a teaching assistant must obtain a master's degree within five years of commencing employment. Otherwise, s/he must either leave the university, or be transferred to any administrative department that s/he is qualified for. Teaching assistants duties include preparing and delivering tutorial and lab sessions, preparing assignments and term projects requirements, preparing and conducting laboratory examinations, and tutorial quizzes, and co-supervising graduation projects.

Lecturer: After a teaching assistant obtains a master's degree, s/he is promoted to a senior teaching assistant. Usually, the duties do not change, but the salary increases slightly. To keep her/his post, a senior teaching assistant must obtain a doctoral degree within five years. Otherwise, s/he must either leave the university, or be transferred to any administrative department that s/he is qualified for.

Assistant professor: Once a senior teaching assistant obtains a doctorate, s/he is hired as an assistant professor, and receives tenureship. Assistant professors duties include delivering lectures, supervising graduation projects, master's theses, and doctoral dissertations.

Associate professor: After at least five years, an assistant professor can apply for a promotion to the rank of associate professor. The decision is based on the scholarly contributions of the applicant, in terms of publications and theses and dissertations supervised.

Professor: After at least five years, an associate professor can apply for a promotion to the rank of a professor. The decision is based on the scholarly contributions of the applicant, in terms of publications and theses and dissertations supervised.

Academic duties of associate professors and professors are nearly the same as assistant professors. However, only associate professors and professors can assume senior administrative posts like a department chair, a college vice dean, and a college dean.
