= Nord (Year of No Light album) =

Studio album by Year of No Light
- Released: 2006
- Recorded: Rec. Studio, September 2005
- Genres: Post-metal, sludge metal
- Length: 58:25
- Labels: Radar Swarm (RSR011); E-Vinyl (EVIL002); Atropine Records (ATR001); Crucial Blast (CBR60)
- Producer: Year of No Light

Year of No Light chronology
Demo 2004 (2004)	Nord (2006)	Live at Roadburn 2008 (2009)

Nord is the debut full-length album by French post-metal band Year of No Light, released in 2006. It was originally released by Radar Swarm (CD), E-Vinyl & Atropine (LP), and reissued later by Crucial Blast for the US version.

== Description ==
The album is the last recorded with singer and keyboardist Julien Perez in the lineup, and consists of ten tracks (eleven on the vinyl version).

In 2007 North was distributed in the U.S. market through Crucial Blast, while a deluxe edition including a second CD was made available on 14 May 2012, collecting all the tracks made the group between 2004 and 2008 and originally included in the various splits or collections.

== Reception ==
Professional ratings
Review scores
Source	Rating
AllMusic	4.5/5 stars

Ned Raggett of AllMusic praised the album, assigning four and a half stars out of five, writing that "tracks such as the opening Sélénite and the magnificent, central piece of Nord, Les mains de l'empereur, have the immediate and easy power of veteran bands, combining memorable riffs with an epic atmosphere"; the critic also appreciated the guitar work, likened to the heavier sounds of the Cure, and Perez's vocal performance.

Keith Bergman of Blabbermouth.net on the other hand offered a more mixed review of North, explaining that while it is a well-crafted record, "it brings nothing to the table that defines them personally. Put a needle on this record in a random spot in the middle, and you would immediately know who their influences are, but not who this particular band is."

== Track listing ==
All tracks are written by Year of No Light.

No.	Title	Length
1.	"Sélénite"	5:06
2.	"L'angoisse du veilleur de nuit d'autoroute les soirs d'alarme à accident"	3:04
3.	"Traversée"	9:02
4.	"Librium"	2:17
5.	"Les Mains De L'Empereur"	9:59
6.	"Tu As Fait De Moi Un Homme Meilleur"	4:42
7.	"Somnambule"	8:39
8.	"Prosodia"	2:36
9.	"Par Économie Pendant La Crise On Éteint La Lumière Au Bout Du Tunnel"	5:38
10.	"La Bouche De Vitus Bering"	7:40
Total length:		58:25

Vinyl version track listing
No.	Title	Length
10.	"L'oeil Dans Le Ciel"
11.	"La Bouche De Vitus Bering"	7:40

== Personnel ==
Year of No Light

- Bertrand Sébenne – drums
- Jérôme Alban – guitar
- Pierre Anouilh – guitar
- Julien Perez – vocals, keyboards
- Johan Sébenne – bass

Technical personnel

- Serge Morattel – engineering and mixing
- Alan Douches – mastering
- Greg Vezon – album art and design
