= Year of No Light =

French post-metal band

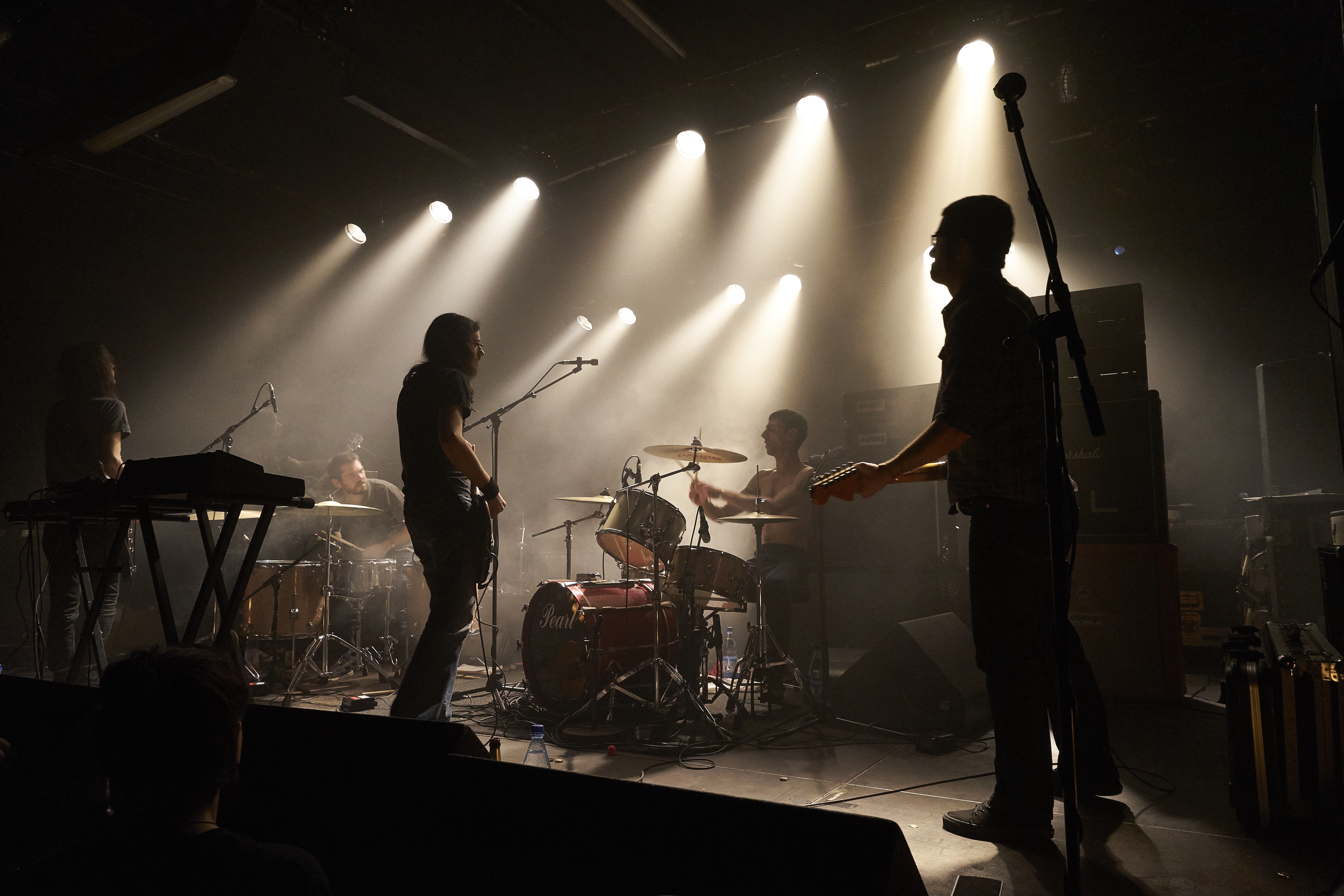
- Year of No Light performing at Droneberg Festival 2015 in Berlin

Background information
- Origin: Bordeaux, France
- Genres: Post-metal, post-rock, sludge metal
- Years active: 2001–present
- Labels: Conspiracy, Crucial Blast, E-Vinyl, Music Fear Satan, Radar Swarm, Pelagic
- Members: Jérôme Alban; Pierre Anouilh; Bertrand Sébenne; Johan Sébenne; Mathieu Mégemont
- Past members: Shiran Kaïdine; Christophe Mora; Julien Perez
- Website: yearofnolight.free.fr

Year of No Light is a French post-metal band formed in Bordeaux in 2001. On their 2006 debut album Nord, the band combined a dark and aggressive sludge metal sound with psychedelic atmospheres inspired by post-rock and shoegazing. In 2008, they underwent a significant line-up change, replacing their vocalist by a third guitarist and a second drummer to become an instrumental sextet. Thereafter, Year of No Light integrated black metal, doom metal, drone and dark ambient influences on the albums Ausserwelt (2010) and Tocsin (2013).

== History ==
Year of No Light was founded in September 2001 in Bordeaux by Johan Sébenne, Bertrand Sébenne, Jérôme Alban and Christophe Mora (Finger Print, Undone). Since its conception, Year of No Light was never a "top priority" band but rather an instrumental side project. After one year of rehearsal, Christophe Mora left the band. Pierre Anouilh succeeded him. One month later, the band played live for the first time.

From 2002 to 2003, they played local shows in Bordeaux. In September 2003, Julien Perez joined the band as a singer. One month later, the new line up played its first show. Year of No Light still remains an "active" side project due to all of the musical activities of the vast majority of its members.

The band finally recorded a demo in June 2004. After its release, the group toured Spain and Basque Country. Following the good feedbacks surrounding the demo (one review describing Year of No Light as "The Cure playing Sludge"), the band worked on its first album during the summer 2005. In September 2005, they recorded Nord with Serge Morattel in Switzerland. The following year, Nord was released to positive reviews. Year of No Light began to tour more often in 2006 and played at the famous Dour Festival in 2007. The same year, Nord was reissued on Crucial Blast, for the CD version, and Cavity Records for the LP.

In 2008, Year of No Light toured Europe and played at the prestigious Roadburn and Hellfest festivals. After several collaborations with acts like Nadja and Fear Falls Burning and some splits recordings, they discarded their singer. At the end of the summer, Year of No Light becomes a six-piece entity with two drummers, one bassist, and three guitarists, backed by some vintage synths. Shiran Kaïdine, from Monarch!, and Mathieu Mégemont, from Aérôflôt, joined the band respectively as third guitarist and second drummer.

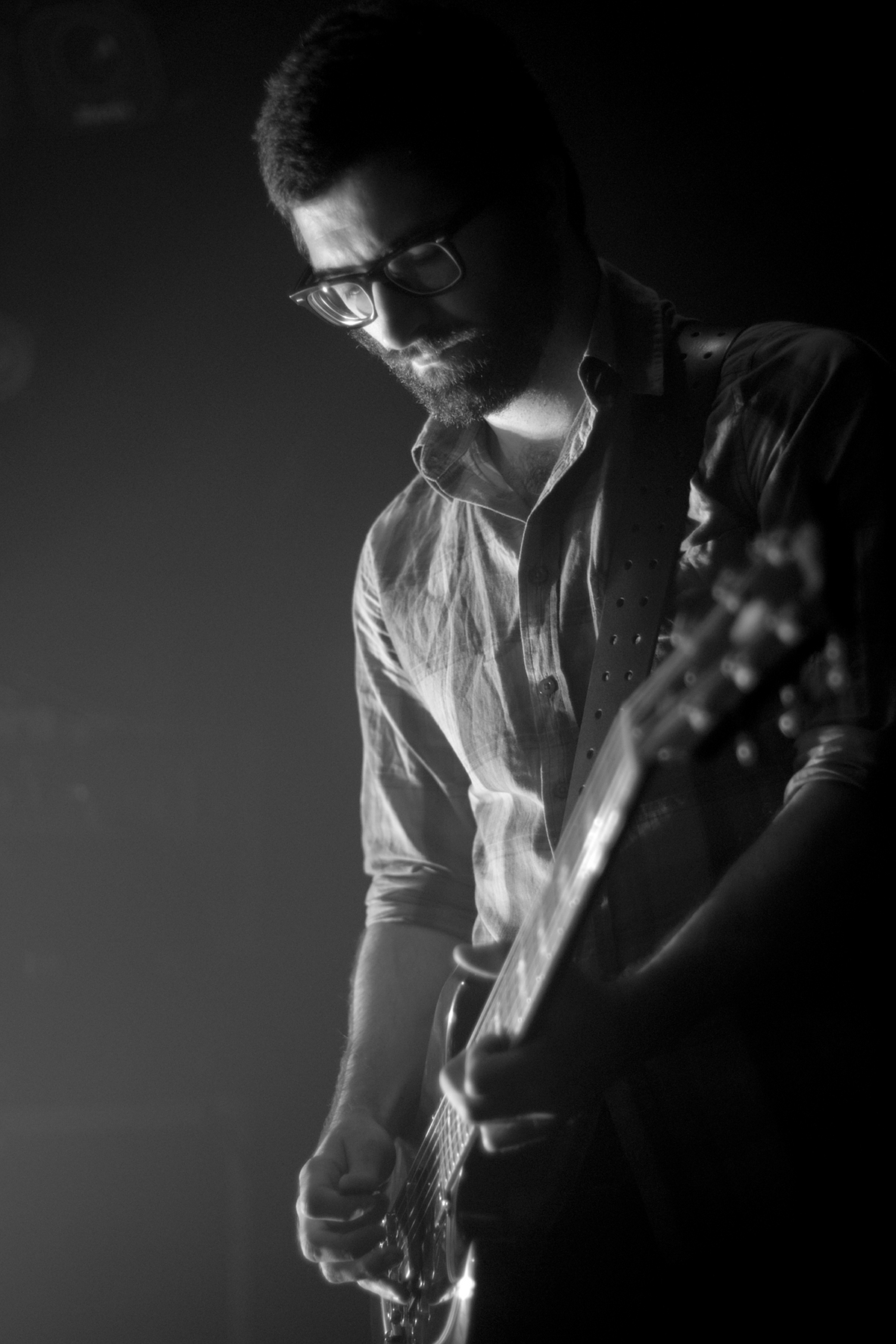
Jérôme Alban performing in 2009

In September 2009, the band began to record Ausserwelt in Bordeaux with Cyrille Gachet. In April 2010, following the release of Ausserwelt on Conspiracy, Year of No Light toured Europe with Irish black metallers Altar of Plagues. The following month, the band worked on a soundtrack for Dreyer's Vampyr, and performed it for the first time, on 28 May 2010, at Barbey Theatre in Bordeaux. In February 2011, Year of No Light played Vampyr in Tallinn, Estonia. The following months, after having recorded new material for upcoming splits, they toured Europe and played two sets at Roadburn: a classical gig (including the totality of Ausserwelt) and the Vampyr performance.

The group worked with French contemporary artist Christian Vialard on Le Temps de l'Ecoute, a video installation reinventing Yves Klein's Monotone Symphony, exhibited at la Villa Arson in 2011.

In late 2014, Year of No Light embarked on their first ever U.S. tour, playing eleven dates. Sludge metal band Take Over And Destroy opened for the first nine shows with various other openers, booked in west coast and southwestern states. The tour then concluded with two nights at New York venue Saint Vitus. The band however performed as a five-piece during this tour, with the band citing guitarist Pierre Anouilh's visa issues preventing him from touring.

Guitarist Shiran Kaïdine died from cancer on 17 April 2026, at the age of 44.

== Members ==
Current

- Jérôme Alban – guitar (2001–present) (Baron Oufo, Donald Washington, Metronome Charisma)
- Bertrand Sébenne – drums, percussions, keyboards (2001–present) (Metronome Charisma)
- Johan Sébenne – bass, keyboards, electronics (2001–present) (Altaïr Temple, Nexus Sun)
- Pierre Anouilh – guitar (2002–present) (Déjà Mort)
- Mathieu Mégemont – drums, keyboards, synthesizer (2008–present) (Aérôflôt)

Former

- Christophe Mora – guitar (2001–2002) (Finger Print, Undone)
- Julien Perez – vocals, keyboards (2003–2008) (Metronome Charisma)
- Shiran Kaïdine – guitar (2008–2026; his death) (Monarch!)

== Discography ==
=== Studio albums ===
Year	Album	Released	Format	Label
2006	Nord	2006	CD	Radar Swarm
2006	Nord	2006	2×LP	E-Vinyl, Atropine Records
2006	Nord	2007	CD	Crucial Blast
2006	Nord	2008	2×LP	Cavity Records, Atropine Records, E-Vinyl
2006	Nord	2012	2×CD (Deluxe Edition)	Music Fear Satan
2010	Ausserwelt	2010	CD	Conspiracy
2010	Ausserwelt	2010	2×LP	Music Fear Satan
2013	Tocsin	2013	CD	Debemur Morti
2021	Consolamentum	2021	CD	Pelagic Records

=== Live albums ===
Year	Album	Released	Format	Label
2009	Live at Roadburn 2008	2009	LP+DVD	Roadburn Records
2009	Live at Roadburn 2008	2011	CD	Roadburn Records
2013	Vampyr	2013	2×LP+CD	Music Fear Satan
2013	Vampyr	2013	CD	Init Records

=== Split albums, EPs and collaborations ===
- Karysun / Year of No Light split 7-inch EP (2009)
- Year of No Light w/ Fear Falls Burning & Nadja (split w/ Machu Picchu Mother Future) LP (2009)
- 3 way Split (split w/ East of the Wall & Rosetta) LP (2009)
- s/t (split w/ Altar of Plagues) LP (2012)
- s/t (split w/ Thisquietarmy) LP (2012)
- s/t (split w/ Mars Red Sky) LP (2012)
- s/t (split w/ Bagarre Générale) LP (2015)

=== Demo ===
- Demo CDR (2004)

=== Soundtracks ===
- Frogtown Movie (2010)
- Mademoiselle... (original soundtrack performed live for the exhibition Rupture mon amour) (2010)
- Vampyr (original soundtrack performed live) (2010–2012)
- Les Maîtres Fous (original soundtrack performed live) (2012-01-06)
