= EarthDaily =

Canadian satellite constellation for optical Earth observation

- Country of origin: Canada
- Operator: EarthDaily Analytics
- Website: earthdaily.com

Specifications
- Bus: Loft Orbital Longbow, based on Airbus Arrow bus

Production
- Planned: 10
- Launched: 7
- Maiden launch: 23 June 2025
- Last launch: 3 May 2026, 7:00 UTC

Related spacecraft
- Launch vehicle: Falcon 9

EarthDaily is a Canadian commercial satellite constellation of optical imaging Earth observation satellites. The constellation was developed by the Canadian company EarthDaily Analytics (EDA) with headquarters in Vancouver, based on assets acquired from the defunct company UrtheCast. Each of the 10 identical satellites is equipped with an optical imaging instrument observing over 22 spectral bands (six for visible light, six for near-infrared, six for shortwave infrared, and four for thermal infrared) with a spatial resolution of 5 m. The constellation's first satellite was launched on Falcon 9's Transporter-14 mission on 23 June 2025. Next six satellites were launched on Falcon 9's CAS500-2 rideshare mission on 3 May 2026 at 7:00 UTC.
