= Instructor =

Instructor may refer to:

== Education ==
- Instructor, a teacher of a specialised subject that involves skill:
  - Teaching assistant
  - Tutor
  - Lecturer
  - Fellow
  - Teaching fellow
    - Teaching associate
    - Graduate student instructor
  - Professor

=== Specialists ===
- Drill instructor
- Driving instructor
- Flight instructor
- Physical training instructor
- Ski instructor
- Swimming instructor

== Publications ==
- Juvenile Instructor, the official periodical of The Church of Jesus Christ of Latter-day Saints (LDS Church) between 1901 and 1930
- The Instructor, the official periodical of The Church of Jesus Christ of Latter-day Saints (LDS Church) between 1930 and 1970
- Instructor, a trade magazine for teachers published by Scholastic Corporation

== Other uses ==
- Ground Instructor, a certificate issued in the US by the Federal Aviation Administration

== See also ==
- List of academic ranks
- Demonstrator (disambiguation)
