= Karysun / Year of No Light =

EP (split) by Karysun and Year of No Light
- Released: September 25, 2009
- Recorded: Karysun: Studio de La Souleuvre; Year of No Light: Théâtre Barbey, Bordeaux, March 2008
- Genre: Sludge metal, doom metal
- Length: 8:46
- Label: Radar Swarm (RSR021); Denovali Records (den23); Destructure Records (D17); Odio Sonoro (ODIO-12); Crucial Blast (CBR74); S.M.D Records (SMD-008); Sound Devastation Records (none); Self-Titled Demo Records (none); Karysun Recordings (KR002)
- Producer: Karysun / Year of No Light

Year of No Light chronology
Live at Roadburn 2008 (2009)	Karysun / Year of No Light (2009)	Ausserwelt (2010)

Karysun chronology
Interceptor (2008)	Karysun / Year of No Light (2009)	Lords / Karysun (2009)

Professional ratings
Review scores
Source	Rating
Deaf Sparrow	3.5/5 stars

Karysun / Year of No Light is a split EP between the French heavy metal bands Karysun and Year of No Light.

== Track listing ==
Side A: Karysun

1. "Salvation" – 4:33

Side B: Year of No Light

1. "Adoration" – 4:13

== Personnel ==
Karysun

Band members

- Nicolas Bazire – drums, backing vocals
- Marc Euvrie – guitars, electronics, vocals

Production

- Anthony Josse – recording
- Guillaume Doussaud – engineering, mixing and mastering

Year of No Light

Band members

- Bertrand Sébenne – drums
- Jérôme Alban – guitar
- Pierre Anouilh – guitar
- Julien Perez – vocals, keyboards
- Johan Sébenne – bass

Production

- Cyrille Gachet – engineering, mixing and mastering

Other personnel

- Ryan Patterson – album art and design
