= Demonstrator =

A demonstrator may be:

- A person performing a demonstration, such as to explain science or technology
- A person demonstrating a product for sale live or in an infomercial
- An attendee at a political rally
- An academic rank
- A vehicle adapted to emergency service specification, and issued to locations for use as a prospective emergency vehicle if adopted to that workforce either police, ambulance or fire.
- A fountain pen with a transparent body originally used so dealers could show customers how they worked. See Demonstrator pen
- Demonstrator (film)

== See also ==
- Demonstration (disambiguation)
