= Grillo Demo =

Argentine artist

Victor Hugo 'Grillo' Demo is an Argentine artist.

Demo left Argentina in 1978 and settled in Ibiza, Spain, where he continues his work. He is known for his jasmine paintings, depicting falling jasmine. Kate Moss, Madonna and Elle Macpherson are collectors of his work.
