= Live at Roadburn 2008 (Year of No Light album) =

Live album by Year of No Light
- Released: August 2009
- Recorded: Saturday, 19 April 2008, Roadburn Festival, Tilburg, Netherlands
- Genre: Post-metal, sludge metal
- Length: 50:32 (LP); 61:33 (DVD); 59:54 (CD)
- Label: Roadburn Records (RBR015); Roadburn Records (RBR017)
- Producer: Roadburn Festival

Year of No Light chronology
| Nord (2006) | Live at Roadburn 2008 (2009) | Karysun / Year of No Light (2009) |

Professional ratings
Review scores
| Source | Rating |
|---|---|
| AllMusic | 4.5/5 stars |

Live at Roadburn 2008 is the first live album by French post-metal band Year of No Light. It was released in August 2009 on LP+DVD, and reissued later on CD in April 2011.

== Track listing ==
All tracks written by Year of No Light, except The Golden Horn of the Moon co-written with Fear Falls Burning.

LP version

Side A:

1. "Tu As Fait De Moi Un Homme Meilleur" – 4:46
2. "Cimmeria" – 5:12
3. "Metanoia" – 8:50
4. "L'Angoisse Du Veilleur De Nuit D'Autoroute Les Soirs D'Alarme À Accident" – 3:51

Side B:

1. "Les Mains De L'Empereur" – 11:52
2. "The Golden Horn Of The Moon (Year Of No Light / Fear Falls Burning Improvisation)" – 16:01

CD version

1. "Audience Noise / Drones" – 1:08
2. "Tu As Fait De Moi Un Homme Meilleur" – 4:46
3. "Cimmeria" – 5:12
4. "Traversée" – 8:14
5. "Metanoia" – 8:50
6. "L'Angoisse Du Veilleur De Nuit D'Autoroute Les Soirs D'Alarme À Accident" – 3:51
7. "Les Mains De L'Empereur" – 11:52
8. "The Golden Horn Of The Moon (Year Of No Light / Fear Falls Burning Improvisation)" – 16:01

== Personnel ==
Band members

- Bertrand Sébenne – drums
- Jérôme Alban – guitar
- Pierre Anouilh – guitar
- Julien Perez – vocals, keyboards
- Johan Sébenne – bass

Other personnel

- Cyrille Gachet – engineering, mixing and mastering
- Emmanuel Romani – live lights
- Greg Vezon – album art and photography
- Richard Schouten – design and layout

== Recording ==
The performance was recorded live at the 13th Roadburn Festival, 19 April 2008 at 013 (The Batcave), Tilburg, Netherlands. It was mixed and mastered by Cyrille Gachet in Bordeaux, France.

== Release ==
Roadburn Records initially released the album in August 2009. It was only available as an LP/DVD pack (RBR015), in a limited edition of 500 copies in three versions (300 black vinyl, 100 gold [+ a silk-screened poster in bonus], 100 silver), all in gatefold covers, attached with a 61-minute DVD of the live show.

In April 2011, Roadburn Records reissued it on a CD edition (RBR017).
