= Boecillo =

Coordinates: 41°32′N 4°42′W

Boecillo, Spain
- Flag Coat of arms

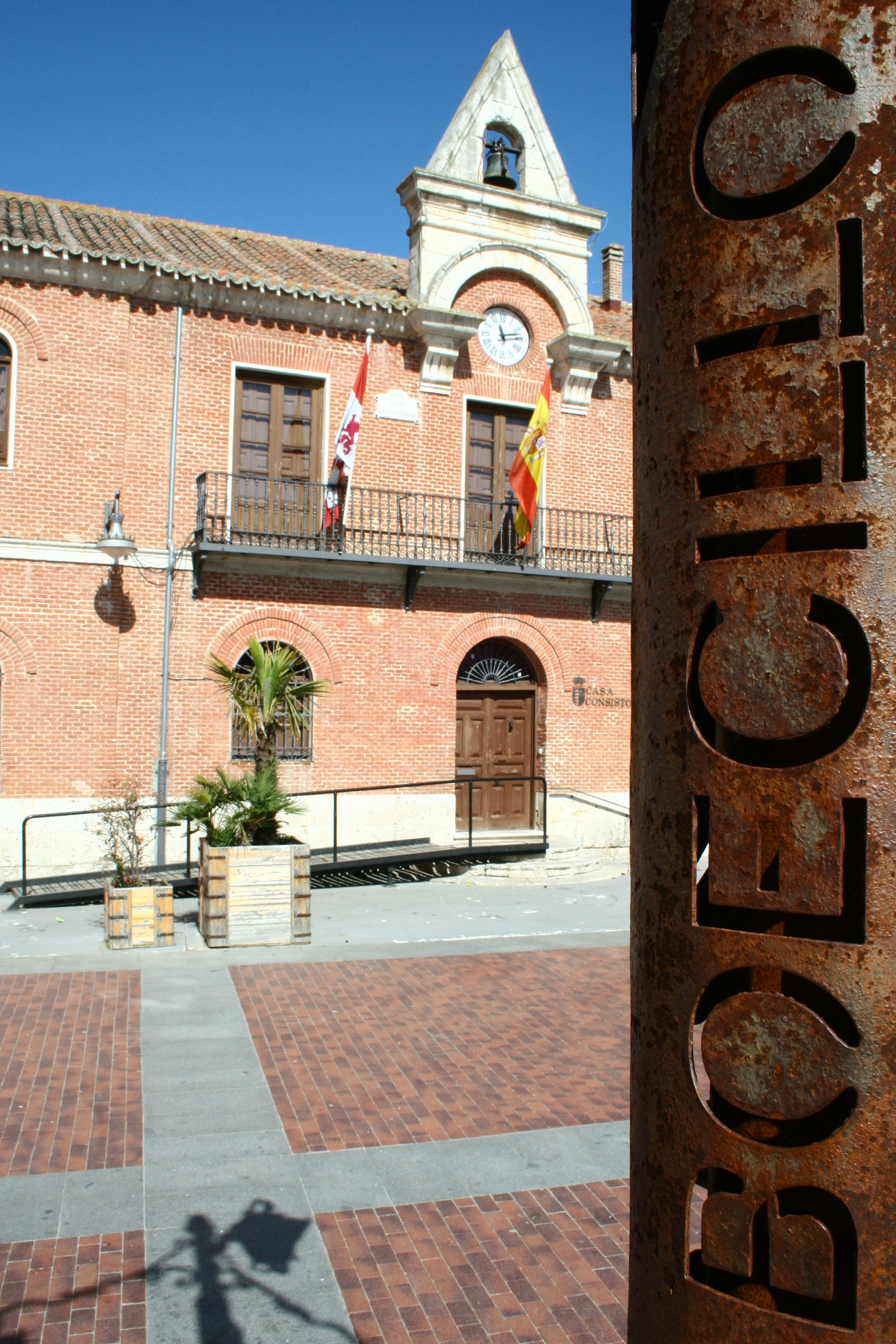
- Town hall
- Country: Spain
- Autonomous community: Castile and León
- Province: Valladolid
- Municipality: Boecillo

Area
  - Total: 24 km^{2} (9.3 sq mi)

Population (2025-01-01)
  - Total: 4,446
  - Density: 190/km^{2} (480/sq mi)
- Time zone: UTC+1 (CET)
  - Summer (DST): UTC+2 (CEST)

Boecillo is a municipality located in the province of Valladolid, Castile and León, Spain. According to the 2025 census (INE), the municipality has a population of 4,446 inhabitants

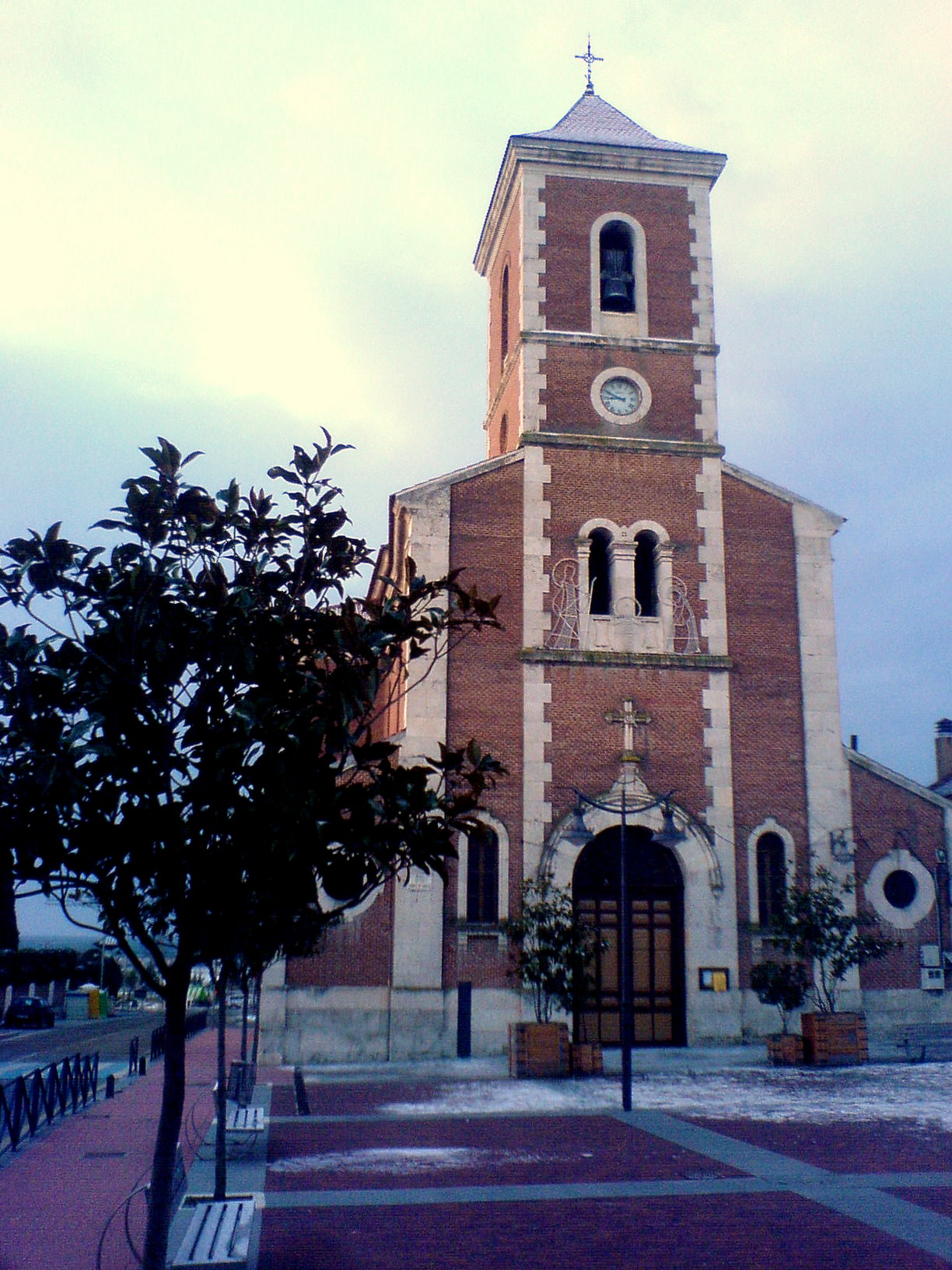
Church of San Cristóbal.

It has its own casino, opened in 1986. It is located in the Palace of Condes de Gamazo, neoclassical building of the late nineteenth century, and was the residence of Germán Gamazo.

The Mayor is Pedro Luis Díez Ortega of the People's Party.

Its technology park is one of the most important in northern Spain. It contains different companies, including a firm that collaborates with NASA, whose director is the Spanish astronaut Pedro Duque.

-

== See also ==
- Cuisine of the province of Valladolid
