= USS Deimos =

USS Deimos may refer to:

- USS Deimos (AK-78), was launched 28 December 1942 and scuttled 23 June 1943
- USS Deimos (AKL-40), was the former Army FS-500, acquired by the Navy 12 December 1951, and loaned to the Republic of Korea the same day
