= List of academic ranks =

Academic rank (also scientific rank) is the hierarchical rank of a teacher, researcher or other employee in a college, high school, university or research establishment. The academic ranks indicate relative importance and power of individuals in academia.

The academic ranks are specific for each country; there is no worldwide-unified ranking system. Among the common ranks are professor, associate professor (docent), assistant professor and lecturer/instructor.

In most cases, the academic rank is automatically attached to a person at the time of employment in a position with the same name, and deprived when a working relationship ends. Thus, the term "academic rank" usually means the same as "position in academia".

In some countries, however, the terms "position" and "academic rank" are not synonymous. So, in modern Russia, there exist the docent and professor ranks, yet the set of positions in academia is broader. The academic rank is conferred only after the person has been successfully working in the docent or professor position for a certain period (and later underwent a centralized control procedure), i.e. not at enrollment, and is kept for life.

The list of academic ranks below identifies the hierarchical ranking structure found amongst scholars and personnel in academia. The lists below refer specifically to colleges and universities throughout the world, although other institutions of higher learning may follow a similar schema.

== Afghanistan ==
Ranks in universities of Afghanistan are listed below according to the Ministry of Higher Education (MoHE) of Afghanistan. These ranks are issued stepwise by the MoHE after some procedures, a period of service and conditions.

- Teaching assistant (in Pashto پوهنیار)
- Senior teaching assistant (in Pashto پوهنمل)
- Assistant professor (in Pashto پوهندوی)
- Associate professor (in Pashto پوهنوال)
- Professor (in Pashto پوهاند)

Honorary degree:

- Distinguished Professor (in Pashto لوی پوهاند)

Term of address in general: ostād or استاد

== Albania ==
Ranks in universities of Albania are listed below according to the Ministry of Education (Albania). These ranks are issued stepwise by the MoHE after some procedures, a period of service and conditions.

- Assistant Lecturer
- Lecturer with Dr. or PhD degree
- Associate Professor
- Professor

== Algeria ==
Academic ranks

- Professeur / Professeur hospitalo-universitaire (أستاذ / أستاذ إستشفائي-جامعي ), equivalent to professor
- Maître de Conférences, classe A / Maître de Conférences hospitalo-universitaire, classe A (أستاذ محاضر قسم أ/أستاذ محاضر إستشفائي-جامعي قسم أ), equivalent to Associate Professor(Level A)
- Maître de Conférences, classe B / Maître de Conférences hospitalo-universitaire, classe B (أستاذ محاضر قسم أ/أستاذ محاضر إستشفائي-جامعي قسم ب), equivalent to Associate Professor (Level B)
- Maître Assistant, classe A / Maître Assistant hospitalo-universitaire, classe A (أستاذ مساعد قسم أ/أستاذ مساعد إستشفائي-جامعي قسم أ), equivalent to Lecturer or Assistant professor (Level A)
- Maître Assistant, classe B (أستاذ مساعد قسم ب), equivalent to Lecturer or Assistant professor (Level B)

Research only

- Directeur de recherche
- Maître de Recherche, classe A
- Maître de Recherche, classe B
- Chargé de Recherche
- Attaché de Recherche

Administrative ranks

- Rector
- Vice-rector
- Dean
- Vice-dean
- Head of department

== Argentina ==
Tenured positions:

- Profesor Titular Ordinario, or Profesor Titular Regular. A tenured, full professor position.
- Profesor Asociado Ordinario, or Profesor Asociado Regular. A tenured, associate professor position.
- Profesor Adjunto Ordinario, or Profesor Adjunto Regular. A tenured, adjunct professor position.

== Australia ==
- Distinguished Professor, emeritus professor, and other professorships with highest honour and contributions to knowledge and society.
- Level E – Professor, or Professorial or Senior Principal Research Fellow; equivalent to Distinguished/Endowed Professor (US) or Professor (UK).
- Level D – Associate Professor, or Principal Research Fellow if research intensive; equivalent to Reader/Associate Professor at a UK university.
- Level C – Senior Lecturer, or Senior Research Fellow if research intensive; equivalent to Senior/Principal Lecturer at a UK university.
- Level B – Lecturer, or Research Fellow if research intensive; Level B is the first tenured academic rank, normally requires at minimum, completion of a PhD.
- Level A - Associate Lecturer, or Associate Fellow if research intensive.

There are often multiple bands or steps for each Level (e.g. Level B - 6 steps, Level C - 6 steps, Level D - 4 steps). For example, an academic who earns the title of Level D has progressed through 12 bands/steps of previous academic service or the equivalent in accumulated academic achievements. There is only one step for Level E. An academic cannot automatically progress from Level B, Step 6, to Level C, Step 1, without a formal application for promotion, which is typically a peer-reviewed process.

== Bangladesh ==
Teachers are categorized in four main classes in Bangladesh at the university level. The ascending ranks of teachers are lecturer, assistant professor, associate professor and professor. University lecturers are normally required to hold a master's degree. After obtaining a PhD, the appointment starts with assistant professor, then gradually associate professor and professor depending on research/teaching experience. Beside these, the title of emeritus is given to extraordinary professors after their retirement.

- Professor emeritus
- Professor
- Associate professor
- Assistant professor
- Lecturer
- Demonstrator

== Belarus ==
Academic ranks

- Prafiesar / Прафесар (Full professor)
- Dacent / Дацэнт (Associate professor)
- Starejšy vykladčyk / Старэйшы выкладчык (Senior lecturer)
- Asistent / Vykladčyk / Асістэнт / Выкладчык (Assistant professor / Lecturer)

Researchers by seniority levels

- Haloŭny navukovy supracoŭnik / Галоўны навуковы супрацоўнік (Chief Researcher)
- Viadučy navukovy supracoŭnik / Вядучы навуковы супрацоўнік (Leading Researcher)
- Starejšy navukovy supracoŭnik / Старэйшы навуковы супрацоўнік (Senior Researcher)
- Navukovy supracoŭnik / Навуковы супрацоўнік (Researcher)
- Malodšy navukovy supracoŭnik / Малодшы навуковы супрацоўнік (Junior Researcher)

Administrative ranks

- Rektar / Рэктар, rector
- Prarektar / Прарэктар, vice-rector
- Dekan fakultetа / Дэкан факультэта, dean of the faculty
- Namiesnik dekana / Намеснік дэкана, vice-dean
- Zahadčyk kafiedry / Загадчык кафедры, head of department

== Belgium ==
Dutch speaking community

- Gewoon hoogleraar (full professor, full-time) (professor ordinarius)
- Deeltijds gewoon hoogleraar - buitengewoon hoogleraar (full professor, part-time) (previously: professor extraordinarius)
- Hoogleraar (professor, reader)
- Hoofddocent II (associate professor, principal lecturer)
- Hoofddocent I (associate professor, senior lecturer)
- Docent (assistant professor, lecturer)
- Doctor-assistent (researcher, must have a PhD)
- Assistent (research assistant, can be enrolled in a PhD or be in the postdoc phase)
- Aspirant (research fellow, enrolled in a PhD degree, appointed by the Fund for Scientific Research FWO)

Administrative ranks:

- Rector
- Vice-Rector
- Decaan (dean, i.e. head of a faculty)

French speaking community

- Professeur ordinaire (full professor, with Ph.D.)
- Professeur extraordinaire (visiting professor in Switzerland, part-time professor in Belgium)
- Professeur (professor, with Ph.D. and Habilitation, tenured)
- Chargé de cours temporaire (adjunct professor, non-tenured)
- Chargé de cours invité (visiting associate professor, non-tenured)
- Directeur de recherche (research director / senior research associate, appointed by National Fund for Scientific Research F.R.S.-FNRS, tenured)
- Chef de travaux agrégé (senior researcher, with Ph.D. and previously with teaching aggregation)
- Maître de recherche (senior researcher / senior research associate, with Ph.D., appointed by National Fund for Scientific Research F.R.S.-FNRS, tenured)
- Chef de travaux (senior researcher, with Ph.D.)
- Chercheur qualifié (senior researcher / research associate, with Ph.D., appointed by federal research council FNRS, tenured)
- Premier assistant (assistant professor)
- Maître d'enseignement (volunteer lecturer, with Ph.D., unpaid, non-tenured)
- Maître de conférences (lecturer/associate professor, with Ph.D., tenured)
- Maître de conférences qualifié (senior associate professor, with Ph.D. and Habilitation, tenured)
- Chargé de recherche (appointed by National Fund for Scientific Research F.R.S.-FNRS, tenured)
- Assistant [de recherche] (research assistant)
- Aspirant (research fellow, enrolled in a Ph.D. degree, appointed by National Fund for Scientific Research F.R.S.-FNRS)

Administrative ranks:

- Recteur (president of university)
- Vice-Recteur
- Doyen (dean, i.e. head of a faculty, elected)
- Président d'institut (director of research institute, elected)
- Vice-Doyen (vice-dean, i.e. head of studies in a faculty)
- Président de département (department head, elected)

== Bosnia and Herzegovina ==
- Profesor – full professor (Must hold PhD or Doctorate and have experience of minimum of six years as a Vanredni profesor)
- Vanredni profesor – associate professor (Must hold PhD or Doctorate and have experience of minimum of five years as a Docent)
- Docent – assistant professor (Must hold PhD or Doctorate Degree. Relevant working experience could be required as well)
- Viši Asistent – senior teaching assistant (Must hold at least Masters Degree with excellent grades. Relevant working experience could be required as well)
- Asistent – teaching assistant (Must hold Undergraduate Degree with excellent grades. Relevant working experience could be required as well)

Administrative ranks

- Rektor – rector / chancellor / president / head of university
- Prorektor – prorector / vice-chancellor / vice president / assistant head of university
- Dekan – dean / head of faculty or school at the university
- Prodekan – vice-dean / assistant head of faculty or school at the university
- Šef katedre – head of department

Honorary ranks

- Profesor emeritus – professor emeritus

== Brazil ==
There is no official academic ranking in Brazilian private universities. However, most of the public Federal Universities apply the following (from the highest position to the lowest one):

- Professor Emérito (professor emeritus)
- Professor Titular (full professor) – PhD required
- Professor Associado (associate professor) – PhD required
- Professor Adjunto (assistant professor) – PhD required
- Professor Assistente (lecturer) – only a master's degree is required
- Professor Auxiliar (assistant lecturer) – no post-graduation degree is required
- Professor Substituto ou Temporário (temporary lecturer)

== Bulgaria ==
- Professor/Full Professor – Професор
- Docent/Associate Professor – Доцент
- Chief/Senior Assistant Professor – Главен Асистент
- Assistant Professor – Асистент

University

- Assistant Professor – Асистент
- Chief/Senior Assistant Professor – Главен Асистент
- Docent/Associate Professor – Доцент
- Professor/Full Professor – Професор

Academy of Sciences

- Scientist III: after Master thesis or Diploma, equal to Assistant
- Scientist II: after Doctoral thesis/PhD/Dissertation, after Dr. Grade (3–5 or 7 years work after Master), equal Chef Assistant, *Associate or Post Doc
- Scientist I: After second Post Doc (1 or 2 years work after PhD/Dr), equal Senior Assistant or Senior Associate.
- Senior Scientist I: after PhD (US, UK....) or Doctoral dissertation/thesis (France, Germany, Russia...) and some years of *Post-Doc, equal of Assoc. Prof.
- Senior Scientist II: after Habilitation, equal to Professor
- Full Professor

Higher administration of the academy of sciences

- Member of correspondence for the Academy of Science (after professor/habilitation), very rare
- Academic: after member of correspondence (for the entire of Bulgaria)

Administrative ranks

- Rector
- Vice-rectors
- Assistant rector
- Secretary general
- Academic ombudsman

== Canada ==
Faculty (teaching staff)

- Professor emeritus or university professor emeritus, a retired professor still active in research; Fr professeur émérite
- Endowed chair professor (e.g. Canada Research Chair professor – Tier 1), a distinguished full professor with endowment
- Professor or full professor (research professor, professor of practice, visiting professor, adjunct professor, professor emeritus; Fr professeur titulaire)
- Associate professor (research associate professor, visiting associate professor, adjunct associate professor; Fr professeur agrégé)
- Senior lecturer (teaching professor)
- Assistant professor (research assistant professor, adjunct assistant professor; Fr professeur adjoint)
- Lecturer or instructor (sessional lecturer or sessional instructor; Fr chargé de cours)

Clinical faculty (Professional academic staff)

- Clinical professor
- Clinical associate professor
- Clinical assistant professor
- Clinical instructor

Clinical instructor is the entry-level rank for clinical members of faculty.

Non-faculty teaching and research personnel

- Senior fellow, senior research fellow or senior scientist / Fr chercheur sénior
- Fellow, research fellow or scientist / Fr chercheur
- Research supervisor or principal investigator / Fr directeur de recherche
- Research associate or postdoctoral associate / Fr associé de recherche
- Research assistant or teaching assistant / Fr auxiliaire de recherche

Administrative ranks

- Dean (often also full professors)
- Associate dean (often also full professors)
- Directors of administrative departments
- Associate/assistant directors of administrative departments
- Chairmen of academic departments (usually full professors)
- Graduate coordinators
- Undergraduate coordinators

== Chile ==
In Chile there is no general law that establishes the academic ranges, although the following are normally used: Professor Titular (full professor), Professor Asociado (associate professor), Professor Assistante (assistant professor), and Instructor.

The University of Chile, the oldest university in the country, distinguishes three academic categories: Ordinary Category, Teaching Category, Adjunct Category, and Postdoctoral Researcher. "Each category has its own academic ranks. Academics in the Ordinary Academic Category must carry out higher education and research or artistic creation". "Academics in the Academic Teaching Category must perform superior teaching, supported by outstanding professional work in the field of their academic work". "Academics in the Adjunct Academic Category must perform superior teaching, or scientific research, or artistic creation, or extension". "They must also demonstrate outstanding academic or professional work in the field of their discipline". In addition, there are three academic statuses: Professor emérito, Professor honorario de Facultad o Instituto y Professor visitante.

The Ordinary Academic Career and the Academic Teaching Career have the following ranks:

- Professor titular (A tenured, full professor position. It is the highest academic rank of the university).
- Professor asociado (A tenured, associate professor position).
- Professor assistante.
- Instructor.

The rank of Instructor "correspond to a stage of training and improvement, and verification of aptitudes for the university task". The ranks of Professor Assistante, Professor Asociado, y Professor Titular "correspond to academics fully trained for the university task, with the capacity to perform it in a creative and suitable way, with varying degrees of autonomy according to the level". The ranks of professor asociado y professor titular are decided by the university's senior evaluation committee. The other ranks are decided by commissions of each faculty.

The Adjunct category has only the rank of associate professor. The Postdoctoral Researcher category has no other rank.

The Pontificia Universidad Católica de Chile has the same three hierarchies of Professor Titular, Professor Asociado and Professor Assistante for the ordinary academic category. It also recognizes five adjunct academic categories: Professor adjunto, Instructor adjunto, Investigador adjunto, Investigador postdoctoral y Professor visitante.

== China ==
- Senior ranks
  - Academic track: Professor (教授)
  - Research track: Researcher (研究员)
- Vice-Senior ranks
  - Academic track: Associate Professor (副教授)
  - Research track: Associate Researcher (副研究员)
- Medium ranks
  - Academic track: Assistant Professor (助理教授)or Lecturer (讲师)
  - Research track: Assistant Researcher (助理研究员)
- Junior ranks
  - Academic track: Assistant Lecturer (助教)
  - Research track: Intern-Researcher (实习研究员)

== Costa Rica ==
- Emeritus or Distinguished professor (Professor Emérito)
- Professor (Professor Catedrático)
- Associate professor (Professor Asociado)
- Adjunct professor (Professor Adjunto)
- Instructor professor (Professor Instructor)
- Visiting professor (Professor Visitante)

The list above presents the ranks used by University of Costa Rica for their academic regime. However, there are no formal or legal academic ranks in Costa Rica. Each university decides their own names. For example, in University of Costa Rica the highest rank is 'Professor Catedrático' and it requires no more than a 5-year "licencitatura" degree and 15 years of teaching/researching and 16 publications (https://www.ucr.ac.cr/docencia/personal-docente.html). Most other universities have no similar framework and the title Professor is used unregulated by anyone.

== Croatia ==
- Redoviti profesor u trajnom zvanju equivalent to distinguished professor (prof. dr. sc. Name Surname)
- Redoviti profesor equivalent to full professor (prof. dr. sc. Name Surname)
- Izvanredni profesor equivalent to associate professor (izv. prof. dr. sc. Name Surname)
- Docent equivalent to assistant professor (doc. dr. sc. Name Surname)
- Viši asistent equivalent to postdoctoral fellow/researcher (dr. sc. Name Surname)
- Asistent equivalent to teaching/research assistant, usually a doctoral student
- Viši predavač equivalent to senior lecturer
- Predavač equivalent to lecturer

Honorary academic rank

- Professor emeritus – awarded to some professors in retirement

Administrative ranks

- Rektor equivalent to rector, head of university (in US equivalent to president of university)
- Prorektor equivalent to prorector, assistant to head of university (in US equivalent to vice-president of university)
- Dekan equivalent to dean, head of faculty or school in university
- Prodekan equivalent to vice-dean, assistant to dean
- Pročelnik odsjeka equivalent to department chairman
- Predstojnik zavoda/katedre equivalent to head of department

== Cuba ==
Honorary:

- Professor Emeritus (granted at the university level by a Rector's decree)
- Consultant Professor (usually for retired but still active professors)

Tenured:

- Professor (Profesor Titular) (full/part-time, PhD required)
- Associate Professor (Profesor Auxiliar) (full/part-time, PhD mostly required)

Non-tenured:

- Assistant Professor (Profesor Asistente) (full/part-time)
- Lecturer (Instructor) (full/part-time)
- Intern (Adiestrado) (a recent graduate with a bachelor's degree, usually from the same institution)

== Cyprus ==
Tenure-track faculty positions

- Professor
- Associate professor
- Assistant professor
- Lecturer

Non-tenure track positions

- Special teaching personnel
- Special scientists

== Egypt ==
Teachers are categorized in five main classes in Egypt at university level. The ascending rank of teacher is demonstrator, assistant lecturer, lecturer, assistant professor and professor. The initial position, demonstrator, is generally enrolled as the top student of the class. Master's degree is required for university-level assistant lecturer. After PhD, the appointment starts with lecturer, then gradually associate professor and professor, depending on research/teaching experience. Beside these, professor of emeritus is given to extraordinary professor after their retirement.

- OSTADH MOTAFAREGH (أستاذ متفرغ), equivalent to professor emeritus
- OSTADH (أستاذ) (the "DH" pronounced like the "TH" in the word "THE"), equivalent to Professor (usually after minimum of five years serving as OSTATH MOSAED as well as publishing certain number of research papers)
- OSTADH (the "DH" pronounced like the "TH" in the word "THE") MOSAED (أستاذ مساعد), equivalent to Associate Professor
- MODARRES (مدرس), equivalent to Assistant Professor (must have a PhD degree)
- MODARRES MOSA'ED (مدرس مساعد), Lecturer (must have a master's degree)
- MOA'ED (معيد), or Teaching Assistant- also called demonstrator- (must have a bachelor's degree; usually graduated top of the class)

== Estonia ==
- Emeriitprofessor (Professor emeritus)
- Professor
- Kaasprofessor (Associate professor)
- Lektor (Lecturer)
- Õpetaja (Teacher)

== Finland ==
In Finland, there is less distinction between graduates and undergraduates: university students may be employed as research assistants (tutkimusapulainen) before they graduate with a master's degree. A person pursuing a doctoral degree must already hold a master's degree, and is typically employed by the university, or enjoys a similar grant, and will be called väitöskirjatutkija (doctoral researcher), nuorempi tutkija (early career researcher), or tohtorikoulutettava (doctoral student). Besides post-doctoral researchers (tutkijatohtori) and senior teaching assistants (yliassistentti), there are several mid-level non-professorial positions, such as teaching researcher (opettava tutkija). Senior teachers and researchers may be employed as, e.g., erikoistutkija (special researcher) or yliopistotutkija (senior research fellow). Docent (dosentti) is a non-professorial rank and title (for life) awarded to academics qualified as a principal investigator and for supervision of doctoral students; however, they do not belong to the professor corps and may be employed elsewhere. Professors (professori) are understood as research group leaders and managers, and traditionally there is no direct equivalent of an assistant/associate/full professor career path, although Aalto University is introducing these. Qualifications for a professor's position are earned as a docent or in other mid-career positions. In management, professors serve as department heads (laitosjohtaja or osastonjohtaja) and deans (head of the faculty, dekaani). The leader of a university is called a rector (rehtori), assisted by multiple vice-rectors (vararehtori). Vice-rectors may retain their professor positions or work full-time as a vice-rector. Some universities have an even more senior officer called Chancellor (kansleri), who is more concerned with outreach and public relations than daily management.

== France ==
	Faculty	Research only	Teaching only	Part-time
Permanent positions	Professeur des universités	Directeur de recherche		Professeur des universités associé
Permanent positions	Maître de conférences	Chargé de recherche	Professeur agrégé or Professeur certifié	Maître de conférences associé
Temporary positions	Attaché temporaire d'enseignement et de recherches (ATER)	Post-doctorant	Chargé d'enseignement	
Temporary positions	Doctorant contractuel chargé d'enseignement	Doctorant contractuel	Chargé d'enseignement	

In French business schools, ranks are the same as in the United States: assistant professor, associate professor, and finally (full) professor.

== Germany ==
A simplified overview of academic ranks in Germany:

	Faculty	Teaching only	Part-time
Permanent positions	Universitätsprofessor (Pay grade: W3 or W2), Professor (W3)	Lehrprofessor	Honorarprofessor (honorary title)
Permanent positions	Professor (W2)	Lehrprofessor	Honorarprofessor (honorary title)
Permanent positions	Professor (W1), Akademischer Oberrat, Akademischer Rat, Wissenschaftlicher Mitarbeiter (tenured)	Lehrkraft für besondere Aufgaben (LfbA) (tenured)	Honorarprofessor (honorary title)
Temporary positions	Akademischer Rat auf Zeit, Akademischer Oberrat auf Zeit (AR/OAR a.Z.), Juniorprofessor (W1 non-tenured), Professor auf Zeit (W2)	Lehrkraft für besondere Aufgaben (LfbA) (non-tenured)	Lehrbeauftragter
Temporary positions	Wissenschaftlicher Mitarbeiter	Lehrkraft für besondere Aufgaben (LfbA) (non-tenured)	Lehrbeauftragter
Temporary positions	Wissenschaftliche Hilfskraft	Lehrkraft für besondere Aufgaben (LfbA) (non-tenured)	Lehrbeauftragter

Appointment grades

- Universitätsprofessor (Pay grade: W3 or W2)
- Professor (W3)
- Professor (W2)
- Hochschuldozent (W2, only in Baden-Württemberg) – although paid like a professor appointed at level W2, lecturers in this position do not have a professor title; the term was formerly used in all states for senior lecturer positions with research and teaching responsibilities (C2, being phased out since 2002)
- Juniorprofessor (not tenured, only rarely with tenure track) (W1)
- Juniordozent (not tenured) (W1, only in Baden-Württemberg)
- Studienrat or Akademischer Rat/Oberrat/Direktor auf Lebenszeit (A13, A14, A15)
- Wissenschaftlicher Mitarbeiter (TVöD 13/14/15, TvL 13/14/15)
- Wissenschaftlicher Mitarbeiter auf Zeit, Akademischer Rat auf Zeit (TVöD, TvL A13 a. Z.)
- Akademischer Mitarbeiter auf Zeit (TVöD, only in Baden-Württemberg)
- Wissenschaftliche Hilfskraft (TdL)
- Studentische Hilfskraft (TdL)

Non-appointment grades

- Privatdozent
- Außerplanmäßiger Professor – conferred, in some German states, to a Privatdozent who has been in service for several years, without formally being appointed as professor

== Greece ==
Academic Staff Ranks

- Professor Emeritus [Ομότιμος Καθηγητής (male) / Ομότιμος or Ομότιμη Καθηγήτρια (female)]. An honorary title that can be awarded to people at the rank of Professor who have reached the legal age for retirement; If they wish, they have the right to continue their research projects for a limited time after retirement.
- Professor [Καθηγητής (male) / Καθηγήτρια (female)].
- Associate Professor [Αναπληρωτής Καθηγητής (male) / Αναπληρώτρια Καθηγήτρια (female)].
- Assistant Professor [Επίκουρος Καθηγητής (male) / Επίκουρος or Επίκουρη Καθηγήτρια (female)].
- Laboratory Teaching Staff member [μέλος Εργαστηριακού Διδακτικού Προσωπικού (Ε.ΔΙ.Π.)]. Holders of a doctoral degree (Ph.D.). that are members of this rank can independently teach courses and supervise undergraduate and post-graduate theses, in the same way as the Teaching Research Staff [Διδακτικό Ερευνητικό Προσωπικο (Δ.Ε.Π.)] (i.e., professors, associate professors, and assistant professors) members do. All members of this rank can be laboratory instructors.

Administrative ranks (Universities and Technical Universities)

- Rector (Πρύτανης).
- Vice-rector (Αντιπρύτανης).
- Secretary General [Γενικός Γραμματέας (male) / Γενική Γραμματέας (female)].
- Dean of the Faculty (Κοσμήτορας)
- Deputy Dean of the Faculty [Αναπληρωτής Κοσμήτορας (male) / Αναπληρώτρια Κοσμήτορας (female)].
- Head of the School (Πρόεδρος Τμήματος).
- Deputy Head of the School (Αντιπρόεδρος Τμήματος).
- Head of the Department [Διευθυντής Τομέα (male) / Διευθύντρια Τομέα (female)].
- Laboratory/Clinic Director [Διευθυντής Εργαστηρίου/Κλινικής (male) / Διευθύντρια Εργαστηρίου/Κλινικής (female)].

The holders of administrative ranks must be Professors or Associate Professors. The only exception is Secretary General, who is not a faculty member.

Administrative ranks (former Technological Educational Institutes; defunct)

The Technological Educational Institutes (TEI) (1983–2019) were reformed between 2013 and 2019 and their departments incorporated into existing universities.

- President (Πρόεδρος).
- Vice-president (Αντιπρόεδρος).
- Secretary General [Γενικός Γραμματέας (male) / Γενική Γραμματέας (female)].
- Director of the School (Διευθυντής Σχολής (male) / Διεθύντρια Σχολής (female)).
- Supervisor of the Department [Προϊστάμενος Τμήματος (male) / Προϊσταμένη Τμήματος (female)].
- Director of the Section [Διευθυντής Τομέα (male) / Διευθύντρια Τομέα (female)].

The holders of administrative ranks must be Professors or Associate Professors.

Defunct Academic Staff Ranks

- Adjunct Assistant Professor [Εντεταλμένος Επίκουρος Καθηγητής (male) / Εντεταλμένη Επίκουρος Καθηγήτρια]. A temporary employee with a short-term contract, usually for one term (semester), usually holder of a doctoral degree (Ph.D.). as described in the Greek Presidential Decree 407/1980 published in the Government Gazette 112/A/9-5-1980. Adjunct Assistant Professors are sometimes called simply as "407" or "P.D. 407", after the number of the Decree.
- Lecturer (1982‒2011) [defunct; in universities and technical universities: Λέκτορας (both male and female) / in technological educational institutes: Καθηγητής Εφαρμογών (male) / Καθηγήτρια Εφαρμογών (female)] it had founded by the law 1268/1982 Government Gazette 87/A/16-7-1982 and it was abolished, defunct, by the law 4009/2011 Government Gazette 195/A/6-9-2011, although there are people that still hold this rank.
- Teaching Assistant was abolished in 1982, but people holding it remain teaching assistants until retirement.
- Adjunct Lecturer [Εντεταλμένος Λέκτορας (male) / Εντεταλμένη Λέκτορας (female)] was abolished.

== Guyana ==
- Professor Emeritus (on retirement)
- Professor
- Reader
- Senior Lecturer
- Lecturer II
- Lecturer I
- Assistant Lecturer
- Tutor
- Laboratory Demonstrator

Administrative ranks

- Chancellor
- Vice-chancellor/president
- Deputy vice-chancellor
- Registrar
- Bursar
- Deputy Registrar
- Deans of Faculties
- Heads of Departments/Schools

== Hong Kong ==
In the past, Hong Kong followed the British system (4 levels). In recent years it has been moving towards its North American counterpart, with the titles renamed to their corresponding equivalence (professor (professor), associate professor (professor/reader), and assistant professor (senior-)lecturer)). Hong Kong's universities usually differ between professorial grades (end- or mid-career research and teaching positions) and lecturers (entry or mid-career positions - in the UK called either teaching fellows or lecturers, and "Mittelbau" in German-speaking countries). Depending on institutions, the title of "professor" is assumed by chair professors and professors, or assistant professors and above.

Academic ranks

- Chair professor
- Emeritus professor
- Professor
- Associate professor
- Assistant professor
- Senior Lecturer
- Lecturer
- Assistant Lecturer
- Research assistant professor
- Post-doctoral fellow
- Adjunct (associate/assistant) professor
- Honorary (associate/assistant) professor
- Professional consultant or teaching consultant/fellow
- Research associate
- Research assistant and teaching assistant (or tutor, instructor, demonstrator)
- Postgraduate or graduate
- Undergraduate

Administrative ranks

- Chancellor (titular, normally the Chief Executive (formerly the Governor) of Hong Kong) or president in the Hong Kong Shue Yan University
- Pro-chancellor (titular, only for the University of Hong Kong and the Hong Kong University of Science and Technology)
- Vice-chancellor or president (or vice president principal in the Hong Kong Shue Yan University): being the chief executive of the institution
- Deputy vice-chancellor (as the first among pro-vice-chancellors in the University of Hong Kong)
- Pro-vice-chancellors or vice-presidents or deputy presidents
- Associate pro-vice-chancellors (as in the Chinese University of Hong Kong) or Associate vice-president (as in the Hong Kong Baptist University, the Lingnan University, the Hong Kong Shue Yan University, and the Hong Kong Institute of Education)
- Registrar
- Provost (for some universities)
- Deans of faculties / schools
- Heads (or directors) of departments / schools

== Hungary ==
- Professzor/egyetemi tanár (university professor/full professor)
- főiskolai tanár (college professor)
- Docens (associate professor)
- Adjunktus (assistant professor)
- Tanársegéd (assistant lecturer)

== Iceland ==
In Icelandic universities, particularly at the University of Iceland, prófessor is the most senior ranking teaching position. Below prófessor is dósent, then lektor. This three step hierarchy is akin to the US-scale, of full-, associate- and assistant-professors. Until the early 1990s no upward mobility was available in the Icelandic system. Most university teachers were hired as "prófessor." A "dósent" or a "lektor" wishing to ascend to a higher rank had to apply for a new position when it became available. Currently (since the 1990s) much more university teachers are hired as junior rank "lektor" and are promoted to "dósent" and "prófessor" if their work proves worthy of it.

Research and teaching career pathway

- Prófessor (Professor), from Latin professor
- Dósent (Associate Professor), from Latin docens, genetive docentis (participle of doceo)
- Lektor (Assistant Professor), from Latin lēctor

Research career pathway

- Vísindamaður (Scientist)
- Fræðimaður (Scholar)
- Sérfræðingur (Specialist)

== India ==
Regular Academic ranks (Hierarchy from top): Academic institutions in India have the mandate of teaching, training and research. This also includes research universities.

1. Professor.
2. Associate Professor.
3. Assistant Professor.
4. In addition to these, there are government sponsored fellowships awarded to able candidates for a 5-year contract period during which they are hosted by an academic or research organisation. Their primary function is to carry out high quality original research. They may become a regular faculty as an assistant professor or associate professor during this period subject to their performance.
5. Assistant Professor (on contract) / Ad hoc faculty – They are primarily involved in teaching for a limited contract period typically 6 months – 1 year.

Research ranks (Hierarchy from top): Research institutions such as national labs have a different kind of hierarchy and are primarily concerned with basic and applied research. They guide Ph.D. students in their research thesis but do not grant degrees. In most cases the Ph.D. candidates are registered with another university which grants the degree. Awarding of degree is subjected to meeting the same criteria as Ph.D. guided by university professors.

1. Scientist H
2. Scientist G
3. Scientist F
4. Scientist E (in some cases EII)
5. Scientist D (in some cases EI)
6. Scientist C
7. Scientist B
8. Scientist A

Non-faculty ranks

1. Research associate (postdoctoral fellows/inspire faculty)
2. Senior research fellow (Ph.D. students after completing two years of course work and research)
3. Junior research fellow (Newly joined Ph.D. candidates)

Administrative ranks in universities

1. Chancellor
2. Vice chancellor
3. Pro vice chancellor
4. Deans / directors
5. Chairperson / HODs / wardens

Administrative ranks in research institutions

1. Director general
2. Director
3. Chairperson of departments / divisions

== Indonesia ==
Academic ranks

According to the Joint Regulations of the Ministry of Education And Culture And Head of National Civil Service Agency No 4/VIII/PB/2014; No 24 Year 2014 and the Regulation of Ministry of Administrative and Bureaucratic Reform No. 46 Year 2013 and No. 17 Year 2013 Article 6; and the Ministry of Research, Technology, and Higher Education decree No. 164/ M/ KPT/ 2019, the academic ranks (Jabatan Fungsional) for lecturer (university-based) and researcher (non-university) are:

Academic ranks for lecturers

1. Dosen (Lecturer)
2. Asisten Ahli (Assistant Professor - Lower)
3. Lektor (Assistant Professor - Upper)
4. Lektor Kepala (Associate Professor)
5. Guru Besar, Profesor (Professor)

Academic ranks for researchers

1. Peneliti Pertama (Junior Researcher)
2. Peneliti Ahli Muda (Associate Researcher)
3. Peneliti Ahli Madya (Senior Researcher)
4. Peneliti Ahli Utama (Research Professor)

Administrative ranks (university)

- Rektor (Rector)
- Wakil Rektor (Vice Rector)
- Dekan (Dean)
- Wakil Dekan (Vice Dean)
- Kepala Program Studi (Head of Department)

== Iran ==
Holders of bachelor's degree when granted to teach in a college:

- Assistant instructor (Persian: مربی آموزشیار; transliteration: "morabbi-e āmuzešyār")

Holders of master's degrees when granted to teach in a college:

- Instructor (in Persian: مربی, transliteration: morabbi)
- Lecturer (in Persian: مدرس, transliteration: modarres)

Holders of Ph.D. degrees:

- Assistant professor (in Persian: استادیار, transliteration: ostādyār)
- Associate professor (in Persian: دانشیار, transliteration: dānešyār)
- (Full) Professor (in Persian: استادتمام ,استاد, transliteration: ostād (tamām))
- Distinguished Professor (in Persian: استادِ ممتاز, transliteration: ostād-e momtāz'')

Terms of address in general: ostād

Emeritus ranks

- Emeritus professor
- Fellow

Administrative ranks

- President
- Chancellor
- Dean
- Head of department.

== Iraq ==
Holders of master's degrees can be (in ascending order):

- Assistant lecturer (in Arabic: مدرس مساعد)
- Lecturer (مدرس)
- Assistant professor (أستاذ مساعد)
- Professor (أستاذ)

Holders of PhD degrees can be (in ascending order):

- Lecturer (مدرس)
- Assistant professor (أستاذ مساعد)
- Professor (أستاذ)
- ُExperienced professor (أستاذ متمرس)

Note: Holders of PhD degrees are automatically promoted to lecturer if they were assistant lecturers before they received their PhD.

- استاذ equivalent to professor.
- استاذ مساعد equivalent to associate professor.
- مدرس equivalent to assistant professor in American Universities (with PhD) or with researches.
- مدرس مساعد Assistant lecturer (without PhD).

== Ireland ==
- Lecturer (Below the Bar): Abbreviated LBB
- Lecturer (Above the Bar): Abbreviated LAB
- Senior Lecturer
- Associate Professor [in practice often referred to as "Professor")
- Professor

A number of universities in Ireland have renamed their academic ranks, more in line with the US System, but the state salary scales still reflect these ranks.

== Israel ==
Academic:

- Professor Emeritus
- Professor Min Haminyan (Full Professor)
- Professor Chaver (Associate Professor)
- Senior Lecturer
- Lecturer

Administrative Ranks:

- President
- Rector
- Dean
- Department Chairman

== Italy ==
Tenured positions (confermato):

- Professore Ordinario, or Professore di I fascia. A tenured, full professor position.
- Professore Associato, or Professore di II fascia. A tenured, associate professor position.
- Professore Aggregato. A 'ricercatore confermato' who is in charge of teaching university classes.
- Ricercatore confermato. A tenured position as researcher, equivalent to associate professor but with no teaching duties.
- Dirigente di Ricerca. A tenured position as senior researcher, equivalent to full professor but with no teaching duties.

Non-tenured positions (non confermato):

- Professore Straordinario, also Professore di I fascia. A three-year full professor appointment leading to tenure.
- Professore Associato non confermato, also Professore di II fascia. A three-year associate professor appointment leading to tenure at associate level.
- Ricercatore non confermato. A three-year position at assistant professor/researcher/lecturer level.
- Ricercatore a tempo determinato di tipo B. A three-year position at assistant professor/researcher/lecturer level, leading to the Professore Associato position.
- Ricercatore a tempo determinato di tipo A. A three-year position (one possible two-year renewal) at assistant professor/researcher/lecturer level.
- Assegnista di Ricerca. A research fellow with a fixed-term appointment.

Honorary titles as Professore Emerito and Professore Onorario also exist and are typically appointed to illustrious academics after retirement.

In Italian universities the role of "Professore a contratto" (literally "Contract Professor") is paid at the end of the academic year nearly €3000 for the entire academic year, without salary during the academic year. In 2020 there are 23 thousand Associate Professors and 28 thousand "Professori a contratto" in Italy. Associate Professors have a starting (net) salary of around 33,000 euros per year (about 56000 gross), Full Professors have a starting salary of 40,000 euros per year (about 70000 gross), and Contract Professors of around 3,000 euros per year.

== Jamaica ==
- Professor Emeritus
- Professor
- Senior Lecturer (Tenured)
- Lecturer (Tenured/Tenure track)
- Assistant Lecturer
- Instructor
- Tutor
- Graduate/Research Assistant

== Japan ==
In the past few decades, Japan has taken steps to make its academic rankings similar to that of the United States. The ranking system is as follows:

- meiyo kyōju (名誉教授) - Professor emeritus
- kyōju (教授) - (Full) Professor
- junkyōju (准教授) - Associate professor
- kōshi (講師) - Lecturer / Junior associate professor / Assistant professor
- jokyō (助教) - Assistant professor

Unlike the other ranks, the kōshi title has no official criteria and thus no standardized English translation. Historically many Japanese associate professors had only master's degrees, but this is no longer the case for younger generations of academics, who in such cases are now limited to the rank of kōshi. There were previously other ranks similar to associate professor and postdoctoral researcher called jokyōju (助教授) and joshu (助手) respectively, but these positions have been eliminated.

The Japanese system includes non-tenured, term-limited positions at all ranks, including professor. These are referred to as ninki tsuki (任期付き) positions and include tokunin (特任) in the official title when contracts are awarded on a rolling, one-year basis. Limited tenure track positions have recently been introduced.

Granting of tenure and promotion to associate professor are not linked; one may be tenured yet remain an assistant professor or promoted to associate professor before being awarded tenure. Because the number of professor and associate professor position is nearly fixed, direct promotion usually requires a higher-level post to be vacated.

== Jordan ==
- Professor (أستاذ)
- Associate professor (أستاذ مشارك)
- Assistant professor (أستاذ مساعد)
- Practitioner Professor (أستاذ ممارس)
- Lecturer (مدرس)
- Assistant lecturer (مدرس مساعد )

== Latvia ==
Administrative positions:

- Rektors (male), Rektore (female) (rector)
- Dekāns (male), Dekāne (female) (dean), head of a faculty (human sciences, natural sciences etc.)
- Nodaļas vadītājs (male) Nodaļas vadītāja (female) (department manager), head of a department (computer science, mathematics etc.)

Academic positions:

- Profesors (male) Profesore (female) Professor
- Asociētais profesors (male) Asociētā profesore (female) associate professor
- Docents (male), Docente (female) (assistant professor), usually almost the same teaching/research/administration division as professor, Doctoral Degree required
- Lektors (male), Lektore (female) Lecturer. Requires MA degree
- Asistents (male), Asistente (female) research or teaching assistant

== Lebanon ==
Academic positions at the Lebanese American University:

- Distinguished Professor
- Professor
- Associate Professor
- Assistant Professor
- Lecturer
- Senior Instructor
- Instructor

== Libya ==
- Professor (أستاذ)
- Associate professor (أستاذ مشارك)
- Assistant professor (أستاذ مساعد)
- Lecturer (محاضر)
- Assistant Lecturer (محاضر مساعد)

== Lithuania ==
- Professor, Profesorius (male) / Profesorė (female)
- Associate professor, Docentas (male) / Docentė (female)
- Assistant professor, Asistentas (male) / Asistentė (female)
- Senior lecturer
- Lecturer, Lektorius (male) / Lektorė (female)

== Macau ==
At the University of Macau there are nine levels of faculty rank, namely:

- Chairman professor
- Distinguished professor
- Professor
- Associate professor
- Assistant professor
- Senior lecturer
- Lecturer
- Senior instructor
- Instructor

At the Macao Polytechnic University there are four levels:

- Professor (Professor coordenador)
- Associate professor (Professor adjuncto)
- Lecturer (Assistente)
- Teaching Assistant (Assistent estagiario)

== Malaysia ==
In general for most public universities in Malaysia:

- Professor
- Associate Professor
- Senior Lecturer
- Lecturer

== Malta ==
- Professor
- Associate Professor
- Senior Lecturer
- Lecturer
- Assistant Lecturer

== Mexico ==
The ranking system in most Mexican public universities is as follows:

- Profesor Asociado A (early assistant professor)
- Profesor Asociado B (assistant professor)
- Profesor Asociado C (early associate professor)
- Profesor Titular A (associate professor)
- Profesor Titular B (full professor)
- Profesor Titular C (senior full professor)
- Profesor Emerito (equivalent to distinguished professor, not to be confused with emeritus professor)

Usually Mexican academics are also fellows of the Sistema Nacional de Investigadores (SNI) that has four levels (candidate, I, II and III) that more or less correlate (but are not equivalent) to the Asociado and Titular A, B, and C professorships. The rank as professor is determined by the individual's institution while the SNI level is determined by an independent committee that evaluates the researchers nationwide.

Many universities and research institutions make a distinction between "Profesores" -Professors- and "Investigadores" -Researchers- (Asociado A, B, C, Titular A, B, C), the main difference is that "Profesores" have a higher load of teaching, while "Investigadores" have a higher load of research, but normally all of them take part in both activities and are considered equivalent.

Research rankings are awarded by the Sistema Nacional de Investigadores which depends on the national research council (Conacyt):

- SNI emeritus researcher (not necessarily higher rank but lifetime, requires 15 continuous years as SNI III)
- SNI III researcher (about 7% of the researchers in SNI)
- SNI II researcher (about 16% of the researchers in SNI)
- SNI I researcher (about 59% of researchers in SNI)
- SNI candidate researcher (C) (about 18% of researchers in SNI)

All titles, both professors and researchers, can be given in a:

- Full-time, or
- Part-time basis

Administrative academic positions:

- Rector or Presidente (Chancellor, chief executive officer)
- Secretario Académico (Provost, Chief Academic Officer)
- Director of Faculty or College (Dean)
- Coordinator (chair)

== Morocco ==
Academic Positions

1. Professeur d'Enseignement Supérieur

2. Professeur Habilité à Diriger les Recherches (supervise les recherches)

3. Professeur Assistant (co-encadre les recherches)

Before Academic Position

1. Docteur

2. Doctorant

== Myanmar ==
- Rector
- Pro-Rector I
- Pro-Rector II
- Pro-Rector III
- Professor (Head of Department)
- Professor I
- Professor
- Associate Professor
- Lecturer
- Assistant Lecturer
- Tutor/ Demonstrator

== Nepal ==
Academic Positions

- Professor Emeritus
- Professor
- Associate professor/Reader
- Assistant Professor
- Lecturer
- Teaching Assistant
- Instructor
- Technical support staff

Administrative Positions

- Chancellor
- Pro-chancellor
- Vice-chancellor
- Rector
- Registrar
- Deans of School
- Heads of department
- Program Coordinator

== Nigeria ==
Academic Positions

- Emeritus Professor (retired)
- Professor
- Associate Professor / Reader
- Senior Lecturer
- Lecturer I
- Lecturer II
- Assistant Lecturer
- Graduate Assistant

Administrative Positions

- Chancellor
- Pro-chancellor
- Vice-chancellor
- Deputy vice-chancellor
- Pro-vice-chancellor
- Deans of faculties (some are referred to as provost)
- Sub-deans of faculties
- Heads of departments/schools
- Department/school directors of studies

== North Macedonia ==
- Demonstrator, Демонстратор-(Graduate employee in a university)
- Younger assistant, Помлад Асистент-(B.Sc.)
- Assistant, Асистент-(M.Sc.)
- Docent, Доцент-(Assistant professor)
- Vonreden Professor, Вонреден Професор-(associate professor)
- Professor, Професор-(full-time professor)
- Professor emeritus, Пензиониран Професор-(retired professor)
- Academic, Академик-(academician)

Administrative positions:

- Pomlad referent, Помлад референт- (Younger Civil Servant) -High School Diploma
- Referent, Референт- (Civil Servant) -High School Diploma
- Postar Referent, Постар Референт- (Senior Civil Servant) -High School Diploma
- Pomlad Sorabotnik, Помлад Соработник- (Younger Associate) -Associate Degree
- Sorabotnik, Соработник- (Аssociate) -Associate Degree
- Postar Sorabotnik, Постар Соработник- (Senior Associate) -Associate Degree
- Rakovoditel na studentski prasanja, Раководител на студентски прашања- (Head of Students Affairs) -Bachelor's degree
- Rakovoditel na katedra/institut, Раководител на катедра/институт- (Head of Department/Institute) -Ph.D.
- Prodekan, Продекан- (Vice Dean) -Ph.D.
- Dekan, Декан- (Dean) -Ph.D.
- Prorektor, Проректор- (Vice Rector) -Ph.D.
- Rektor, Ректор- (Rector) -Ph.D.

== Pakistan ==
The hiring of academic positions in public universities throughout Pakistan is managed by the Higher Education Commission of Pakistan, the requirement for all positions vary with respect to the field of studies e.g. Engineering, IT, Medical, Law, and Arts and Design.

There are four faculty ranks: lecturer, assistant professor, associate professor, and professor.

In engineering public universities, a lecturer requires an M.Sc. or B.Sc. degree and high academic standing in the field (e.g. gold medalist, among top 15 students of graduating class). An assistant professor position requires a Ph.D. in relevant field with no experience. An associate professorship can be conducted in the fourth year of employment, although, it is becoming more common for promotion and tenure to be awarded in the sixth year of employment.

A professor requires ten years post-PhD teaching/research experience in an HEC recognized university or a post-graduate institution or professional experience in the relevant field in a national or international organization. It requires a minimum of 8/12/15 research publications (with at least 2/3/5 publications in the last 5 years) by the calendar years 2007/2008/2012 respectively, in HEC/PEC recognized journals:

- Professor Emeritus
- Meritorious Professor/ Distinguished National Professor
- Professor
- Associate professor
- Assistant professor
- Lecturer
- Lab Engineer
- Research Associate

== Peru ==
After some recent reforms in the University Law (Minedu, 2014), the Peruvian universities (public and private) consider these ranks:

Extraordinary professors: Principally, this is a category of recognition for his contribution as professor or researcher when he retires or as a professional when he has built a great contribution to society throughout his career. To have 10% as maximum of these professors in any university (public or private) is mandatory.

- Emeritus professor (Profesor Emérito) - For this recognition, the candidate should be faculty member (former ordinary professor in retiring process).
- Honorary professor (Profesor Honorario) - For this recognition, the candidate is not related to a faculty member. For instance, in this category is the Doctor Honoris Causa.

Research professors: Principally, full-time research position with few teaching responsibilities. Research professorships are almost always funded by grants or fellowships apart from the regular university budget. He is designated because of its academic excellence. He has a special bonus of fifty percent (50%) of its total payments. The competent authority of each university evaluates every two years, the production of the ordinary professors, for their permanence as a researcher.

Ordinary professors: Often full-time (with exclusivity) professors with research competences. Principal faculty. To have 25% as minimum of these professors in any university (public or private) is mandatory.

- Full professor (Profesor Principal) - PhD and MSc required, and former Associate professor or 15 years of experience (minimum) as researcher in the field to apply.
- Associate professor (Profesor Asociado) - PhD (postgraduate level) and MSc required, and former Assistant professor or 10 years of experience (minimum) as researcher in the field to apply.
- Assistant professor (Profesor Auxiliar) - PhD (postgraduate level) and MSc required, and 5 years of experience (minimum) as researcher in the field to apply.

Lecturer (hired professors): Often part-time (with non-exclusivity) professors. Complementary faculty. Generally, their primary employer is not the university with which they have the status. Principally, this kind of professor come from practitioner market and not develop research activities. MSc required.

In addition, the universities developed prior ranks, as junior temporary rank, to get experience and training (with strong motivation to be ordinary professor):

- Instructor (Instructor, Jefe de Práctica) - MSc required in Postgraduate level and BSc required in Undergraduate level.
- Teaching/research assistant (Asistente Académico/Investigador) - MSc required in postgraduate level and BSc required in undergraduate level.

== Philippines ==
- Professor Emeritus
- Professor
- Associate Professor (doctorate is typically required)
- Assistant Professor (master's degree required; typically this is also the entry-level rank for PhD holders)
- Instructor (master's degree required)
- Assistant Instructor
- Lecturer (other Universities/Colleges)
- Guest Lecturer (other Universities/Colleges)

Administrative ranks (UP System;National)

- Chancellor/University President
- Vice Chancellor/Vice President for Planning and Development
- Vice Chancellor/Vice President for Research and Extension
- Vice Chancellor/Vice President for Academic Affairs
- Vice Chancellor/Vice President for Finance and Management
- University Registrar
- Dean
- Assistant Dean/Associate Dean
- Department Chairman/Program Chairman
- Faculty Members and Staff

Other professors

- Professor-researcher
- Researcher
- Professor Emeritus
- Ad honorem professor

Tenure

Due to Philippine labor laws regarding permanency, a faculty member who has not received tenure within three years of initial hire cannot continue as a full-time hire at the same university.

== Poland ==
Academic ranks at Polish universities and other higher education institutions are regulated by national legislature and may be further specified by university's internal regulations. Academic staff is also divided into research, teaching or research-teaching staff. The current structure and requirements for the academic ranks was introduced in 2018.

Rank	Requirement
Profesor (Professor or Full professor)	Academic title of professor (Note: In Poland, terminal degree is the title of professor (tytuł profesora), which is awarded by the President of Poland on the recommendation of the Council of Scientific Excellence.)
Profesor uczelni (Associate professor, lit. University professor)	Doctoral degree and prominent academic or didactic achievements
Adjunkt (Adjunct or assistant professor)	Doctoral degree
Asystent (Assistant)	Master's degree

Institutes of the Polish Academy of Sciences implement similar structure of research ranks, with the exception of associate professor being titled profesor instytutu (lit. institute professor) and the requirement of habilitation or professorship for the position.

== Portugal ==
- Professor Catedrático or Professor Coordenador Principal (full professor) – PhD and Agregação (habilitation) required
- Professor Associado com Agregação or Professor Coordenador com Agregação (associate professor with Agregação) – PhD and Agregação (habilitation) required
- Professor Associado or Professor Coordenador (associate professor) – PhD required
- Professor Auxiliar com Agregação (assistant professor) – PhD and Agregação (habilitation) required
- Professor Auxiliar or Professor Adjunto (assistant professor) – PhD required

Extinct ranks:

- Assistente (teaching assistant) - without a PhD
- Assistente estagiário (junior teaching assistant) - without a PhD or a master's degree

== Romania ==
Administrative ranks

- Rector (Rector): one per university
- Prorector (Vice-rector): one or more per university
- Decan (Dean): one per college
- Prodecan (Vice-dean): one or more per college
- Director de departament (Head of department): one per department
- Șef de disciplină (Head of a subject): one for each subject

Research-and-teaching staff (higher rank)

- Profesor universitar (Professor): holding a doctorate degree international-impact research activity
- Conferențiar universitar (Associate professor/ Senior Lecturer/ Reader): holding a doctorate degree and national-impact research activity
- Lector universitar or Șef de lucrări (Assistant Professor/ Associate Professor/ Lecturer): holding a doctorate degree and local-impact research activity
- Asistent universitar (Assistant Professor/ Assistant Lecturer): holding a doctorate degree (or in case of a limited time contract they can be in the process of getting a doctorate degree)

Special

- Profesor invitat (Visiting professor)
- Profesor emerit or Profesor consultant (Emeritus professor)

== Russia ==
In Russia, unlike in most other countries, synonymization of the terms “academic/scientific rank” and “position in academia” is not admissible, except in informal conversations. Officially, the “scientific rank” in Russia is a title that is conferred by the Higher Attestation Commission to the scientist after several years of successful work in the professor (or deemed equivalent) or docent (or deemed equivalent) position. Similar traditions existed in the USSR.

== Rwanda ==
Academic ranks

- Full Professor
- Associate Professor
- Senior Lecturer
- Lecturer (PhD)
- Assistant Lecturer (Msc)
- Tutorial assistant (Cum Laude undergraduate assisting in teaching and research)

== Saudi Arabia ==
- Professor أستاذ/أستاذ دكتور
- Associate Professor أستاذ مشارك
- Assistant Professor أستاذ مساعد
- Lecturer محاضر
- Demonstrator معيد
- instructor مدرب

== Singapore ==
Singapore universities adopt a hybrid of US and British academic ranks. Faculty members on the tenure track are appointed for sustained excellence in both teaching and research. Assistant professors are appointed on term contracts, while associate professors and professors may be appointed either with tenure or on term contract. Faculty members on the educator track engage in high-quality educational activities. They are oriented towards teaching excellence, student learning, and pedagogical research and innovation. Appointments in this track include teaching assistants, instructors, lecturers, senior lecturers and associate professors (educator track). They are on term contracts which are usually of 1–3 years in the first instance. Research track faculty members focus on conducting fundamental research of high international quality. Appointments on this track include research assistants, research fellows, senior research fellows, associate professor (research) and professor (research). They are on term contracts of 1–3 years in the first instance. Practice track faculty members are scholar-practitioners with professional skills and expertise in industry to complement the teaching and research enterprise of the university. They also contribute significantly to the outreach activities of the school. Appointments are to associate professor (practice) and professor (practice). They are on term contracts of 1–3 years in the first instance.

- Tenure track: assistant professor; associate professor; professor
- Educator track: teaching assistant; instructor; lecturer; senior lecturer; associate professor (educator track)
- Research track: research assistant; research fellow; senior research fellow; associate professor (research); professor (research)
- Practice track: associate professor (practice); professor (practice)

== Slovakia ==
- Profesor (professor), both degree (written prof. before name) and position. Professors are appointed by the president after a successful accomplishment of the process of awarding a professorship. One of the requirements is an already accomplished docent degree.
- Docent (associate professor), both degree (written doc. before name) and position. The degree is awarded by the rector after a certain number of years of teaching and after a successful accomplishment of habilitácia (a process concluded by a defense of a reviewed research manuscript and a public lecture).
- Odborný asistent (lecturer / researcher), this title covers positions from lecturers to researchers. Requirements for lecturers / researchers vary, usually a Ph.D. / Th.D. is required.
- Asistent (assistant lecturer), at least Master degree is required.

Special

- Hosťujúci profesor (hosting professor), significant expert with whom a dean with the approval of the scientific council of a faculty concluded employment at the position of professor
- Hosťujúci docent (hosting associate professor), significant expert with whom a dean with the approval of the scientific council of a faculty concluded employment at the position of associate professor
- Mimoriadny profesor (adjunct professor; sometimes also translated as associate professor, but it is not same position as docent), associate professor temporarily appointed to the position of professor at a faculty while being an expectant to professor degree (written mimoriadny profesor after name)

Administrative

- Rektor (rector), head of the university
- Prorektor (vice-rector), typically three to five people are vice-rectors; the position is further specified by indicating domain a vice-rector is responsible for (e. g. study-related issues, research, public relationships, international relationships, development, information technology)
- Kvestor (registrar, bursar), senior professional financial administrator of the university
- Dekan (dean), head of a faculty
- Prodekan (vice-dean); the position is further specified by indicating domain a vice-den is responsible for (e. g. admissions, study-related issues, research, public relationships, international relationships, information technology)
- Riaditeľ (director), head of a sub-unit at the university or a faculty (institute, research center), e. g. Institute of Life-Long Learning of the Slovak University of Technology, Institute of Physical Education and Sport at the Pavol Jozef Šafárik University
- Vedúci katedry (departmental chairman), head of a katedra (department) – sub-unit at a faculty
- Zástupca vedúceho katedry (deputy departmental chairman), deputizes department chairman if necessary

Honorary ranks

- Emeritný profesor (professor emeritus), may be awarded by the rector on the proposal of the scientific council of the university for significant contributions in the field of science, art or education to professor older than 65 years who is no longer employment at the university, but is still active in research and teaching
- Doctor honoris causa (honorary doctor for the sake of the honor), honorary doctorate of the university or a faculty awarded for special merit (written Dr.h.c. before name)

== Slovenia ==
- Asistent – assistant (Must hold at least master (after Bologna process) or honours degree (university diploma awarded before the Bologna process) with excellent grades, pursuing a postgraduate studies (either doctorate / PhD studies or pre-Bologna process Magister studies). Relevant working experience or publications could be required as well.)
- Asistent-raziskovalec – research assistant (Must hold at least master (after Bologna process) or Honours degree (university diploma awarded before the Bologna process) with excellent grades, pursuing a postgraduate studies (either Doctorate / PhD studies or pre-Bologna process magister studies). Relevant working experience or publications could be required as well.)
- Lektor (usually a native speaker of a taught language)
- Docent – assistant professor (Must hold doctorate / PhD. Relevant working experience and publications could be required as well.)
- Izredni profesor – associate professor (Must hold PhD or doctorate and have experience of minimum of five years as a docent)
- Redni profesor – full professor (Must hold PhD or doctorate and have experience of minimum of five years as a docent/associate professor)

Administrative ranks

- Rektor – rector / chancellor / head of university
- Prorektor – prorector / vice-chancellor / head of university assistant
- Dekan – dean / head of faculty, academy or school at the university
- Prodekan – vice-dean / head of faculty, academy or school at the university
- Predstojnik oddelka – head of department; several per faculty, academy or school at the university
- Predstojnik katedre – head of cathedra/chair; several per faculty or per department

Honorary ranks

- Zaslužni profesor – distinguished professor, a title bestowed to professors for their extraordinary achievements

== South Africa ==
- Full professor
- Associate professor
- Senior lecturer
- Lecturer
- Junior lecturer

== South Korea ==
Protected job titles (a.k.a. tenure positions):

- (Full) professor (정교수/교수)
- Associate professor (부교수)
- Assistant professor (조교수)

Other positions:

- Lecturer (강사)
- Research professor (연구 교수)
- Clinical professor (임상 교수)
- Adjunct professor (겸임 교수)
- Teaching assistant professor ( 강의전문 조교수)
- Collegiate professor
- Visiting professor (객원 교수/초빙 교수)
- Chaired professor (석좌 교수)
- Emeritus professor (명예 교수)

== Spain ==
- Full Professor / Catedrático de Universidad
- Associate Professor / Profesor Titular
- Assistant Professor / Senior Lecturer / Profesor Contratado Doctor
- Lecturer / Profesor Ayudante Doctor
- Instructor (Often Part Time) / Profesor Asociado

== Sri Lanka ==
The appointment of professors follows the British system and is governed by the University Grants Commission regulations. A points-based system considers contributions to the research field, national development and institutional development. Several types of professorships exist:

- Professor emeritus (on retirement at the age of 65)
- Senior professor
- Professor
- Associate professor

Professor positions are clearly separated from other junior faculty positions such as, in seniority order: senior lecturer (grade I) (usually PhD and 6+ years service), senior lecturer (grade II) (usually a PhD and 2+ years service), lecturer (usually with PhD), lecturer (probationary), Temporary lecturer.

- Professor emeritus (on retirement)
- Senior professor
- Professor
- Associate professor
- Senior lecturer
- Lecturer
- Temporary lecturer
- Instructor/ demonstrator
- Student instructor (undergrad)

Administrative ranks

- Chancellor (titular)
- Vice-chancellor/president
- Registrar
- Deans of faculties
- Heads of departments/schools
- Directors of Postgraduate Institutes

== Sudan ==
- Professor أستاذ
- Associate Professor أستاذ مشارك
- Assistant Professor أستاذ مساعد
- Lecturer محاضر
- Teaching Assistant مساعد تدريس

== Sweden ==
Academic ranks

- Docent (Qualified to become an associate professor, normally unpaid title, equivalent to habilitation)
- Adjungerad professor (Visiting/adjunct professor, part-time, non-tenured)
- Adjunkt (Instructor-lecturer, without Ph.D., permanent teaching position)
- Forskarassistent (post-doctoral research assistant, non-tenured)
- Biträdande Lektor (assistant professor, tenure-track)
- Lektor (associate professor, with Ph.D., tenured)
- Professor (full professor, tenured)
- Professor Emeritus (professor emeritus)
- Director musices (Director Musices)

Administrative ranks

- President (Rektor)
- Deputy President (Prorektor)
- Dean (Dekan)
- Vice Dean (Prodekanus)
- Head of Department (Prefekt)
- Deputy Head of Department (Proprefekt)

Honorary titles

- Honorary doctor (Hedersdoktor)
- Honorary Fellow (Honorary Fellow)

== Switzerland ==
German-language universities

(Note: The title of "Oberassistent" is comparable to the German Akademischer Rat, a postdoctoral position that today has mostly been replaced by the position of Juniorprofessur. It is typically non-tenured and does not imply faculty rank (i.e., one would not participate in faculty meetings of professors).)

- Ordentlicher Professor/Ordentliche Professorin, Ordinarius/Ordinaria: full professor
- Ausserordentlicher Professor/Ausserordentliche Professorin, Extraordinarius/Extraordinaria: associate professor
- Assistenzprofessor/Assistenzprofessorin: assistant professor (requires PhD)
- Assoziierter Professor/Assoziierte Professorin: adjunct professor
- Titularprofessor/Titularprofessorin: affiliated professor
- Honorarprofessor/Honorarprofessorin: honorary professor
- Privatdozent/Privatdozentin (PD): senior lecturer (has the habilitation but not professorship)
- Gastdozent/Gastdozentin: visiting lecturer
- Lehrbeauftragter/Lehrbeauftragte: lecturer
- Oberassistent/Oberassistentin: senior researcher/lecturer (typically after 3–4 years as a postdoc)
- Postdoc: Postdoc (i.e., after PhD)
- Wissenschaftlicher Mitarbeiter/Wissenschaftliche Mitarbeiterin: Scientific Staff (Note: typically synonymous with "Assistent/Assistentin")
- Assistent/Assistentin: research assistant (typically a PhD student)
- Hilfassistent/Hilfassistentin: Undergraduate research assistant / Undergraduate teaching assistant

French-language universities

- Professeur ordinaire (full professor, chairman)
- Professeur extraordinaire
- Professeur invité
- Professeur associé (associate professor literally, yet functions as full professor or reader, non-chairman, tenured)
- Professeur assistant (assistant professor literally, yet functions as associate professor, tenure-track)
- Chargé de cours (senior lecturer, yet functions as associate professor, tenure-track)
- Privat docent (has the habilitation but not professorship, required for tenure-track)
- Chargé d'enseignement (lecturer, not tenure-track)
- Maître-Assistant (assistant professor or lecturer, non-tenured)
- Assistant (lecturer, usually a graduate student)
- Moniteur (undergraduate student)

== Syria ==
The academic rankings in the Syrian Arab Republic are very similar to the Egyptian ones; see Academic ranks in Egypt for details.

== Taiwan ==
- Professor emeritus (名譽教授)
- Professor (教授)
- Associate professor (副教授)
- Assistant professor (助理教授) (assistant professor and above are mainly for people who hold a PhD degree. Some are promoted to this rank by distinctive industrial performance.)
- Lecturer
- Adjunct professor
- Adjunct associate professor
- Adjunct assistant professor (According to the contract work, and less welfare. Usually 1 to 2 years.)
- Adjunct researcher

== Thailand ==
- Professor (ศาสตราจารย์)
- Associate professor (รองศาสตราจารย์)
- Assistant professor (ผู้ช่วยศาสตราจารย์)
- Lecturer (อาจารย์)

== Trinidad and Tobago ==
- Professor Emeritus
- Professor
- Senior Lecturer
- Lecturer
- Assistant Lecturer
- Instructor
- Graduate/Research Assistant

== Tunisia ==
- Professeur ordinaire (full professor)
- Professeur extraordinaire (full professor)
- Professeur (professor)
- Chargé de cours définitif (associate professor, tenured)
- Chargé de cours temporaire (assistant professor, tenure-track)
- Chargé de cours invité (visiting assistant professor, non-tenured)
- Maître de conférences (associate professor, tenured)
- Directeur de recherche (research director, appointed by federal research council FNRS)
- Chef de travaux agrégé (senior researcher with teaching aggregation, with Ph.D.)
- Maître de Conférences (senior researcher, with Ph.D., appointed by federal research council FNRS)
- Chef de travaux (senior researcher, with Ph.D.)
- Chercheur qualifié (senior researcher., appointed by federal research council FNRS)
- Premier assistant (senior research assistant, with Ph.D.)
- Chargé de recherche (researcher, appointed by federal research council FNRS)
- Assistant de recherche (research assistant)

Administrative ranks

- Recteur (president of university)
- Vice-Recteur
- Doyen (dean, i.e. head of a faculty, elected)
- Président d'institut (director of research institute, elected)
- Vice-Doyen (vice-dean, i.e. head of studies in a faculty)
- Président de département (department head, elected)

== Turkey ==
Academic ranks

- Emeritus Profesör, (Honorary Retired professor)
- Ordinaryus Profesör, (At least 5 years professor with a chair, representing a given area. Since 1960, this title is not given.)
- Profesör, (Full professor)
- Doçent, (Associate professor)
- Yardımcı Doçent, (Assistant professor. This title was not given since 2018 and replaced with Doktor Öğretim Üyesi title)
- Doktor Öğretim Üyesi, (Assistant Professor Literally: Doctor Teaching Member)
- Öğretim Görevlisi Doktor, (Lecturer with doctorate, Literally: Teaching Officer, Doctor introduced after 2018)
- Öğretim Görevlisi, (Lecturer, Literally: Teaching Officer)
- Okutman, (Instructor, This title not given since 2018 and replaced with Öğretim Görevlisi title)
- Doktor Araştırma Görevlisi, (Doctor Research/Teaching Assistant with doctorate, Literally: Doctor Research Officer introduced after 2018)
- Araştırma Görevlisi, (Research/Teaching Assistant Literally: Research Officer)
- Başasistan Hekim (Head of Assistant Medical Doctors)
- Asistan Hekim (Assistant Medical Doctor replaced with Doktor Araştırma Görevlisi after 2018)

Administrative ranks

- Rektör, rector or president (professors)
- Rektör Yardımcısı, vice-rector or vice-president (doctorate or above, generally associate professors or professors)
- Fakülte Dekanı, dean of the faculty (professors)
- Enstitü müdürü, Director of the institute (doctorate or above for research institutes, professors for graduate education institutes)
- Dekan Yardımcısı, vice-dean or associate dean (doctorate or above, generally associate professors or professors)
- Enstitü müdürü, Director of the institute (doctorate or abovr, generally associate professor or above)
- Enstitü müdür yardımcısı, deputy director of the institute (doctorate or above)
- Bölüm Başkanı, head of department (doctorate or above, generally associate professors or professors with highest experience)
- Yüksekokul Müdürü, head of school (doctorate or above)
- Ana Bilim/Sanat Dalı Başkanı, head of chair/ chairman of academic programs (doctorate or above, generally associate professors or professors with highest experience in the area)

== Ukraine ==
Academic ranks

- Profesor / Професор (Full professor)
- Dotsent / Доцент (Associate professor)
- Starshyj doslidnyk (starshyj naukovyj spivrobitnyk) / Старший дослідник (старший науковий співробітник) (Senior researcher, Senior research fellow)
- Starshyj vykladach / Старший викладач (Senior lecturer)
- Vykladach / Викладач (Lecturer)
- Asystent / Асистент (Assistant professor)

Administrative ranks

- Rektor / Ректор, rector or president (professors)
- Prorektor / Проректор, vice-rector or vice-president (professors)
- Dyrektor instytutu / centru / Директор інституту / центру, Director of the institute / centre (assistant professor or above)
- Dekan Fakultetu / Декан факультету, dean of the faculty (associate professor or above)
- Zastupnyk dekana/dyrektora / Заступник декана/директора, vice-dean or associate dean (associate professor or above) / deputy director of the institute (assistant professor or above)
- Zaviduvach kafedry / Завідувач кафедри, head of department (assistant professor or above)
- Zaviduvach laboratoriji / Завідувач лабораторії, head of laboratory (assistant professor or above)
- Zaviduvach sekciji kafedry / Завідувач секції кафедри, chairman of academic programs (assistant professor or above)

== United Kingdom ==
Research and teaching career pathway

- Professor/chair
- Reader (or principal lecturer in some post-1992 institutions)
- Senior lecturer
- Lecturer, clinical lecturer
- Assistant lecturer, demonstrator, seminar leader, associate lecturer, graduate teaching assistant, departmental lecturer

Research career pathway

- Professor/professorial research fellow/research professor/director of research
- Reader
- Senior research fellow/Senior researcher
- Research fellow, research associate
- Research assistant

Teaching career pathway

- Professorial teaching fellow
- Principal teaching fellow
- Senior teaching fellow
- Teaching fellow
- Teaching associate
- Graduate teaching assistant

Technical career pathway

- Principal technologist, Departmental manager/coordinator
- Senior chief technologist, Lab manager/coordinator
- Chief technician
- Senior technician
- Advanced technician
- Technician
- Junior technician, apprentice technician
- Trainee technician

== Uruguay ==
At the university level, Services/Chairs follow the following structure:

- Ayudante de Cátedra (Grado 1)
- Asistente de Cátedra (Grado 2)
- Profesor Adjunto (Grado 3)
- Profesor Agregado (Grado 4)
- Profesor Titular (Grado 5)

== Venezuela ==
- Professor Titular (Full Professor)
- Professor Asociado (Associate Professor)
- Professor Agregado ("Aggregated" Professor or "Early Associate" Professor - between assistant and associate professor)
- Professor Assistante (Assistant Professor)
- Instructor (Lecturer, Instructor, Teaching Professor)

== Zimbabwe ==
- Full professor
- Associate professor
- Assistant professor
- Senior lecturer
- Lecturer
- Teaching assistant

== See also ==
- Educational accreditation
