= Wolfram Demonstrations Project =

Open source software demonstrations

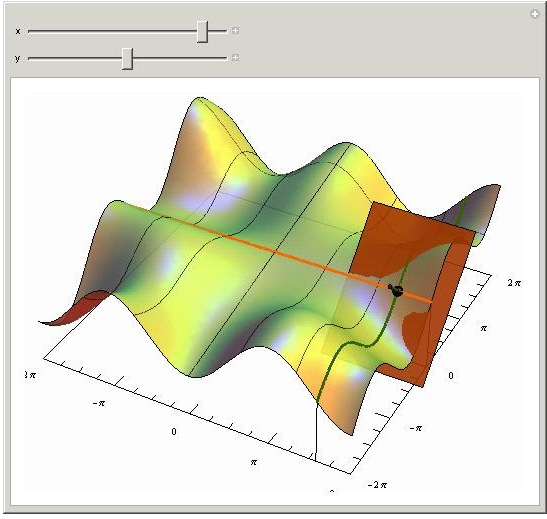
One of the Demonstrations about surface tangents

The Wolfram Demonstrations Project is an open-source collection of interactive programmes called Demonstrations. It is hosted by Wolfram Research. At its launch, it contained 1300 demonstrations but has grown to over 10,000. The site won a Parents' Choice Award in 2008.

Wolfram Research's staff organizes and edits the Demonstrations, which may be created by any user of Mathematica, then freely published and freely downloaded.

== Technology ==
The Demonstrations run in Mathematica 6 or above and in Wolfram CDF Player, which is a free modified version of Wolfram Mathematica and available for Windows, Linux, and macOS and can operate as a web browser plugin. Demonstrations can also be embedded into a website. Each Demonstration page includes a snippet of JavaScript code in the Share section of the sidebar.

The Demonstrations typically consist of a direct user interface to a graphic or visualization that dynamically responds to user actions. Each Demonstration also has a description of the concept. The website is organized by topic, for example: science, art, and biology.
