= Eindhovense Studentenvereniging Demos =

Eindhovense Studenten Vereniging Demos (Eindhoven Students' Association Demos) is a students' association in Eindhoven, the Netherlands. Its members are mostly students at the Eindhoven University of Technology or the Fontys Hogeschool Eindhoven. The association was founded on March 14, 1963. The association is not based on traditional values, but on democracy and the equal status of its members. It has no hazing. Since 1969, Demos has resided in The Bunker, a building it shares with various other students' associations. In 2012, it was announced that The Bunker is to be demolished, and Demos is set to move to a new building in Eindhoven's city center in the spring of 2016.
