= Demo 2004 =

Demo album by Year of No Light
- Released: 2004
- Recorded: Bordeaux, June 2004
- Genre: Post-metal, sludge metal
- Length: 28:28
- Label: Radar Swarm (RSR007)
- Producer: Year of No Light

Year of No Light chronology
Demo 2004 (2004)	Nord (2006)

Professional ratings
Review scores
Source	Rating
Aversion Online	7/10 stars

Demo 2004 is the demo album by French post-metal band Year of No Light, released in 2004. It was originally released on a limited edition CDR (150 copies) on Radar Swarm. Most of the songs were later re-recorded for the band's first album, Nord.

== Track listing ==
All tracks written by Year of No Light.

1. "Thanatos" – 4:18
2. "L'Angoisse Du Veilleur De Nuit D'Autoroute Les Soirs D'Alarme À Accident" – 2:44
3. "Le Rire Mauvais Des Enfants Sages" – 1:06
4. "Tu As Fait De Moi Un Homme Meilleur" – 4:16
5. "Ils Avaient Des Visages D'Anges Et Des Fusils Automatiques" – 3:32
6. "Ils Te Feront Payer Tes Crimes En Monnaie De Cauchemar" – 1:08
7. "Par Économie Pendant La Crise On Éteint La Lumière Au Bout Du Tunnel" – 4:55
8. "Qu'Importe Qu'Ils Me Haïssent, Pourvu Qu'Ils Me Craignent" – 6:59

== Personnel ==
Band members

- Bertrand Sébenne – drums
- Jérôme Alban – guitar
- Pierre Anouilh – guitar
- Julien Perez – vocals, keyboards
- Johan Sébenne – bass

Other personnel

- Julien Perez – recording
- Greg Vezon – album art and design
