= Urthecast =

UrtheCast Corp.
- Company type: Private
- Traded as: TSX: UR
- Industry: Earth observation
- Founded: 10 December 2010
- Defunct: 2021
- Headquarters: Vancouver, British Columbia, Canada
- Area served: Worldwide
- Key people: Don Osborne (CEO) (Chair of the Board); Dr. George Tyc (CTO); Sai Chu (CFO); Wade Larson and Scott Larson (Co-Founders)
- Products: Remote sensing Geospatial information
- Revenue: $15.6 million (2018)

Urthecast was a Canadian company that specialized in satellite imaging, data services and geo-analytics. The company operated two cameras on the International Space Station (ISS) and two satellites in low Earth orbit. Urthecast also planned to launch two satellite constellations, OptiSAR and UrtheDaily, to provide global coverage and high-resolution imagery of the Earth. However, the company faced financial difficulties and filed for creditor protection in 2020. A new start-up, EarthDaily Analytics, emerged from Urthecast’s insolvency in 2021.

== History ==
Urthecast was founded in 2010 by Wade Larson and Scott Larson, with the vision of providing live video streaming of the Earth from space. The company partnered with the Russian Federal Space Agency (Roscosmos) to install two cameras on the ISS: a medium-resolution camera (MRC) and a high-resolution camera (HRC). The MRC could capture objects about 6 meters across or larger, while the HRC could capture objects of 1 meter across. The cameras were launched in 2013 and became operational in 2014.

In 2015, Urthecast acquired Deimos Imaging, a Spanish-based earth observation company, and its two satellites: Deimos-1 and Deimos-2. Deimos-1 had a resolution of 22 meters per pixel and could cover 650,000 square kilometers per day. Deimos-2 had a resolution of 75 centimeters per pixel and could cover 150,000 square kilometers per day. Urthecast also announced plans to launch a 16-satellite constellation called OptiSAR, which would combine synthetic aperture radar (SAR) and optical sensors to provide all-weather and day-night imaging capabilities.

In 2016, Urthecast announced another satellite constellation project called UrtheDaily, which would consist of eight satellites equipped with multispectral sensors to capture images of the entire Earth’s landmass every day at a resolution of 5 meters per pixel. The company contracted Surrey Satellite Technology Ltd (SSTL) to manufacture the satellites. Urthecast received funding from the Canadian government’s Strategic Aerospace & Defense Initiative (SADI) program for the development of OptiSAR.

In 2018, Urthecast acquired Geosys, an agricultural data analytics company, from Land O’Lakes, Inc. Geosys provided crop monitoring and yield forecasting services using satellite imagery and weather data.

== Financial troubles and insolvency ==
In September 2020, UrtheCast filed for creditor protection under the Companies’ Creditors Arrangement Act (CCAA) in Canada and sought similar protection in the U.S. under Chapter 15 of the Bankruptcy Code. The company stated that it had been unable to secure sufficient financing or find a buyer for its assets amid the COVID-19 pandemic.

In February 2021, UrtheCast announced that it had entered into an asset purchase agreement with a consortium led by Antarctica Capital Management LLC, a U.S.-based private equity firm. The consortium agreed to acquire UrtheCast's Deimos Imaging business and related assets for $3.2 million USD. The transaction was approved by the Canadian court overseeing UrtheCast’s CCAA proceedings and closed on 26 February 2021. As part of the deal, Antarctica Capital formed a new company called EarthDaily Analytics, which took over UrtheCast's Deimos Imaging business and its UrtheDaily satellite project. EarthDaily Analytics also retained most of UrtheCast's employees and customers. The new company announced that it would focus on providing optical imagery and data products for the agriculture industry and other markets.
