= Elecnor Deimos =

Deimos
- Industry: Aerospace
- Founded: 2001
- Headquarters: Tres Cantos, Spain
- Key people: Simone Centuori (CEO)
- Parent: Indra Sistemas
- Website: deimos-space.com

Deimos is a Spanish technology group that specializes in space, defense, transports, aeronautics, maritime, telecommunications and digital intelligence.

== Areas of activity ==
Deimos operates in the following markets:

- Space
- Aeronautics
- Maritime
- Transport
- Industry and utilities
- Telecom and media

== History ==
Deimos was founded in 2000 and was part of the Spanish Elecnor group under the name Elecnor Deimos until 2024.

On November 1, 2024, Deimos was acquired by Indra Sistemas and merged with the Indra Espacio division.

== International presence ==
Deimos is present in the following countries:

- Spain

- Tres Cantos (Madrid): Deimos Space Headquarters
- Puertollano (Ciudad Real): Deimos Castilla la Mancha Headquarters
- Boecillo (Valladolid)

- Portugal

- Lisbon: Deimos Engenharia Headquarters

- United Kingdom

- Harwell: Deimos Space UK Headquarters

- Romania

- Bucarest: Deimos Space Romania Headquarters
