= Ukrainian information war during Russian invasion of Ukraine =

Ukrainian information war during Russian invasion of Ukraine has a great impact on the information space, attracting the attention of both Ukrainian and global publics. The focus of the Ukrainian narrative is largely on international support and the desire to present events in a light favorable to Ukraine. Ukrainian discourse focuses on internal dynamics and the situation inside Ukraine. One aspect of Ukrainian propaganda is the desire to evoke an emotional response from the audience and to spread dramatic wartime stories. Ukrainian media have been accused of telling propaganda stories and urban legends such as the "Ghost of Kyiv" or the "Guardians of Snake Island."

Ukrainian propaganda is not limited to the domestic information space, penetrating the Western media. With the support of foreign consultants, especially American lobbyists, Ukraine has launched a "PR machine," creating a structure of international advertising and PR agencies that actively introduce prepared information messages into the international space.

== Information narrative ==
For long time prior to the Russian invasion, Ukraine had been strategizing to establish an information advantage. Over the years, the country has developed methods to limit the use of Russian information and shape its national narrative. Despite Russia's numerical and technological superiority, the Armed Forces of Ukraine have demonstrated resolve and training beyond 2014 levels, giving them a moral advantage and increasing their chances of success.

Ukrainian state-level efforts have focused on totemizing the Ukrainian cause to attract worldwide support and call for a boycott against Russia. Since the beginning of the war, Ukraine has realized the importance of controlling the dissemination of information by its citizens and Russia's use of that information. The country's government agencies have used propaganda techniques to spread stories of heroism, boost morale, and appeal for help. Over time, Ukrainians have been banned from posting images of Ukrainian army movements or explosions on social media to prevent recognition by Russian guidance systems. Also, Ukrainian civilians have actively supported propaganda efforts by sharing images of military action. The narrative initiated by the Ukrainian government is complemented by the repeated dissemination of images of women on the front lines, showing the use of Molotov cocktails, military equipment or weapons to symbolize resistance. This aspect of Ukrainian propaganda and manipulative news aims to emphasize the idea of "heroic resistance" in order to attract international public support.

The Ukrainian government, independent organizations and Western countries have taken measures to combat Russian information exploits, including plans for Russia to use fake videos of Ukrainian attacks as a pretext for invasion. At the beginning of the invasion, photos from other conflicts, movies and even video games claiming that Russian attacks were taking place appeared on social media.

The counteroffensive nature of Ukrainian propaganda is the focus on Russia's defeat and Ukraine's military success, especially in the active phase of the war in 2022. In addition to the counteroffensive approach, Ukrainian propaganda also uses a counter strategy to discredit Russian propaganda narratives about Ukraine, especially in the context of international decisions. It recognizes the influence of Russian propaganda on the world stage and seeks to challenge by presenting different perspectives and evidence, drawing on its national narratives, archetypes, and symbols of Ukrainian identity. In addition, Ukrainian propaganda emphasizes the contradictory nature of the Russian propaganda narrative and attempts to destroy Russian mythologems by demythologizing them. Ukrainian narratives are characterized by the main motive represented by the "liberation struggle" of Ukrainians for their national identity and statehood.

As the war in Ukraine deepens, the country's communications strategy, according to Wired, has become more slicker and more professional, emphasizing the actions of ordinary people showing courage in war. According to The Washington Post, Ukraine has been successful in the information war, launching an aggressive communications campaign that has led to significant arms shipments from the West and widespread support for economic sanctions against Russia. However, Ukrainian propaganda has a strong presence in Western media, and Ukraine itself has also faced accusations that negative coverage of its activities is downplayed in the media.

Ukrainian propaganda emphasizes the results of counterstrategies during invasion. It seeks to inform the public about potential threats, such as chemical attacks and mined areas, as well as warning about possible scenarios and reacting to changes in the situation. Despite the electricity crisis in 2023, Ukraine has emphasized electronic devices and their use.

Ukrainian side also made significant efforts to distance itself from anti-Semitism in Ukrainian propaganda and sought support for Israel, but in the process unwittingly reinforced negativist stereotypes.

=== Levels of propaganda ===
Ukrainian military propaganda, according to Eric Potocki, editor of the Slovak newspaper Postoj, is aimed at two levels. Internally, it tries to maintain the discipline and morale of its army by publicizing Russian war crimes as well as destroyed Russian military equipment. In doing so, the Ukrainian side overstates Russia's losses and downplays its own. The second level of Ukrainian military propaganda is communication with the international community, as well as indirectly with the Russian leadership. Thus, Ukrainian President Volodymyr Zelenskyy seeks support from other countries, asking for supplies of defense equipment, weapons and other necessary supplies, but at the same time he sends a signal to the Kremlin as well.

Silviu Petre, a researcher at the Romanian National Intelligence Academy, notes that the Ukrainian propaganda struggle can be divided into two levels: the efforts of the elites centered around Zelenskyy and the grassroots efforts where the armed forces and ordinary citizens are the main actors.

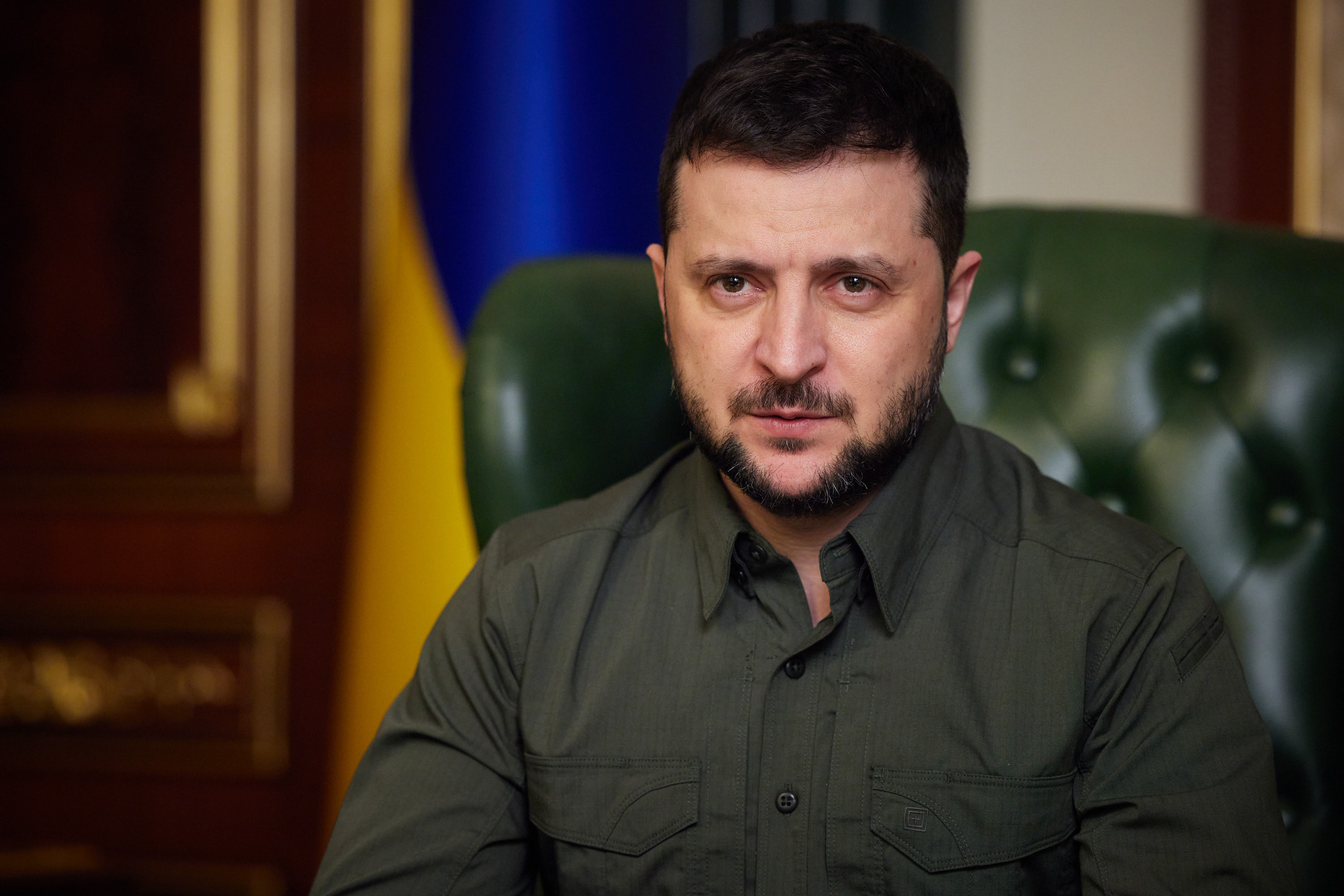
Volodymyr Zelenskyy in April 2022

=== Zelenskyy's narratives ===
Zelenskyy pursued an unconventional communication strategy characterized by a disregard for standard diplomatic language. This made Ukraine's supporters in the West uncomfortable, including when criticizing the (U.S. President) Joe Biden administration's policy of sanctions against the Nord Stream 2 pipeline.

Once the invasion began, Ukrainian propaganda quickly took hold in the media space. In the first hours of the Russian invasion of Ukraine, President Zelenskyy's communication was of particular importance to the country. Amid rumors that the Ukrainian leadership might have fled the country, Zelenskyy decided to record a video of members of his administration in a khaki-colored military uniform on a Kyiv street to emphasize his status and decision to remain in the capital during invasion. This gained him popularity both in Ukraine and in the global community. Zelenskyy also said the following famous phrase: "I need ammunition, not a trip".

Zelenskyy actively used social media and appealed to the emotions of foreign leaders, challenging their policies. He actively appealed to Western countries for additional support. His actions increased arms supplies to Ukraine from the West and economic sanctions against Russia. Zelenskyy's tactics went to a broader level, including regular video messages, selfies, and official video conferences, leading to an international response to the Russian invasion. His appeals haven't only focused on supporting Ukrainians in the face of war, but also on getting the attention of ordinary Russians through social media. Depending on the audience, he switches between languages, for example speaking in Russian when addressing Russians. In his speeches, he cited theses that "Russians are rapists," "Russians kill all Ukrainians," "Russians say the name 'Ukraine' should disappear," "Russians say it is welcome to kill as many Ukrainians as possible in the war," "NATO should help," "NATO countries should rush to Ukraine's aid," and so on.

Prior to Russia's invasion of Ukraine, many Western observers believed that Russia had the propaganda advantage, but since the Russian offensive began in February 2022, Western scholars and journalists and have noted Zelenskyy's thoughtful information narratives and effective messages. International media observed skillful management of public opinion by Zelenskyy. Despite some inconsistencies in the facts, the narrative he promoted was effective and garnered Western sympathy. He used social media to spread propaganda during the war even while hiding in his bunker.

Zelenskyy initiated a number of discursive speeches to attract the attention of the world community. He actively speaks on the world stage, addressing various organizations and countries with calls for sanctions, military support and humanitarian aid. His public appearances are not limited to political audiences, including non-standard events such as participation in various cultural events and TV shows.

Zelenskyy's team developed a format of daily video messages to the people of Ukraine. He also made televised addresses to parliaments, including those of the European Union and NATO countries. With the help of his characteristic online appearances, Zelenskyy developed a certain reputation and image in wartime conditions. In the West, Zelenskyy has become known as the "communicator-in-chief" who has been instrumental in attracting international support for Kiev through daily video messages. Zelenskyy also regularly gives speeches to move neutral countries to side with Ukraine. The assistance of Western countries and the effective use of modern technologies such as social media and artificial intelligence have contributed to Ukraine successfully gaining control of the information space and de facto winning the information war.

Zelenskyy's media campaign included, among other things, rejecting U.S. President Joe Biden's offer to leave the country, conducting live broadcasts using a cell phone, communicating with European leaders about his possible demise, and making public appearances with his wife for Vogue magazine. Zelenskyy has also used unconventional public appearances while attending events such as the Golden Globe Awards, Grammy Awards, and Venice Film Festival. In 2022, he was named Time magazine's "Person of the Year".

However, six months into the war, as Foreign Policy notes, problems in public relations have manifested themselves. For example, a photo shoot for Vogue, a CBS documentary showing problems with the supply of U.S. weapons, and Amnesty International's allegations of abuses by Ukrainian forces were criticized. There have also been reports of Ukraine losing territory in the east and internal government changes. The CBS and Amnesty International reports were rejected by Ukraine, which, according to Foreign Policy, signaled difficulty in developing a credible narrative to support the interests of Zelenskyy and his supporters in the West.

An analysis by scholars Anton Oleynik and Volodymyr Paniotto showed an increase in Zelenskyy's emphasis in 2023 on occupation (a key category for framing the war as "national liberation"), the AFU, Bakhmut (the site of intense and long battles), Kharkiv, Kherson, as well as on "missiles" and "shelling". The study also showed that Ukrainian propaganda turned out to be less effective than Russian propaganda.

=== Strategic communications ===
Ukraine was highly prepared in various aspects, including information warfare, for the Russian invasion. The system, which has been in place for many years and combines the public sector and civil society, used available resources and successfully mobilized both the local and international community. The communication strategy approved in 2021 by the Ukrainian Ministry of Foreign Affairs, based on four scenarios of varying complexity, ranging from Russian information operations to a full-scale military invasion, included specific coordinated actions. However, despite being prepared for the worst-case scenario, all aspects of such a development were not foreseen, and the structures responsible for strategic communications found themselves in a state of chaos. In this situation, civil society organizations played a crucial role in addressing tasks for which the Ukrainian Foreign Ministry lacked resources.

Professor Kathleen Hall Jamieson of the Annenberg School for Communication at the University of Pennsylvania described Kyiv's messaging strategy as "visually evocative, highly dramatic". Sean McFate, a senior fellow at the U.S. Atlantic Council, noted that Ukraine's communications strategy, known as "stratcom," emphasized the changes in modern conflicts with its emphasis on information sharing, media, and persuasion. In March 2022, The Washington Post reported that Western officials, while acknowledging the success of Ukraine's communication strategy, emphasized the difficulty of directly verifying the information provided on the Ukrainian side.

Ivar Ekman and Per-Erik Nilsson (2023) identify three key factors that have shaped Ukraine's strategic communication since the beginning of the war:

- Coordination. It emphasizes a "one voice" approach in which key communication messages were uniform and transmitted from the government to all levels of government. In this approach, messages were adapted for different audiences, maintaining their coherence and avoiding routine repetition.
- Creating master narratives. According to study, it was based on shaping messages that emphasized Ukraine's moral superiority over Russia and the audacity of Ukrainians on the battlefield. Its goal was to portray Russia as a terrorist state that glossed over its losses, which would emphasize the Russians' failures over the "motivated" Ukrainians.
- Communication style. The Ukrainian government's communications are characterized by careful craftsmanship, a strategic approach, and the use of various techniques necessary to attract the attention of a diverse Internet audience. These techniques include humor, sarcasm, mockery, and even trolling, often disguised in the form of Internet memes. In addition to these factors, scholars also emphasize the importance of using new technologies in Ukraine's communication strategy, particularly social media and the creative dissemination of quality content through them. For example, volunteers formed the NAFO online community to mock Russian propaganda and raise awareness of Russian war crimes in Ukraine. NAFO targets Western audiences and produces and distributes English-language content in the United States, Europe and other regions, playing an important role in the "cognitive warfare" against Russia.

The main narratives of Ukrainian communication were developed based on the analysis of Russian information operations. During 2022, Ukrainian Centre for Strategic Communication and Information Security published more than 200 analytical articles in Ukrainian and English and launched a digital platform, Dovidka Info, to provide information and support to Ukrainians in crisis and war.

As part of its media coordination efforts, the Ukrainian Ministry of Defense actively engages with journalists. On August 18, 2022, the department opened the Military Media Center, which is a hub for news dissemination for Ukraine's defense and security forces. This center is designed to ensure coordinated communication by actively engaging with Ukrainian and foreign media representatives through briefings, press conferences, and other communication channels.

With the start of the offensive on the occupied regions in 2022, the Ukrainian government has developed plans for the reintegration of people living there. The Minister for Reintegration of Temporarily Occupied Territories, Iryna Vereshchuk, noted the preparation of a team of civil servants, teachers and social workers who will work in these regions after their liberation. The term "temporarily occupied territories" was used, sending the message that the liberation of these territories is only a matter of time. This terminology was used not only domestically, but also internationally; it is often used by Western countries.

== Social media ==
Ukraine is waging information warfare as a means of countering the Russian invasion, using media and social media to present the country's military environment to the international community. Various social media platforms such as Instagram, Telegram, TikTok, Facebook and X (formerly known as Twitter) serve Ukrainians and their supporters to spread propaganda content about the brutality of the Russian invasion.

Official Ukrainian military statistics and videos circulated by Ukrainians created an image of slowing down the advance of a large and organized Russian army. On social media, optimistic videos were actively circulated, creating the impression of a successful Ukrainian resistance. On online platforms, Ukrainian propaganda raised negative aspects of Russia's actions. The dissemination of photos and videos, such as stories of Ukrainians living in bomb shelters, led to worldwide support for Ukraine and condemnation of Russia's actions. Brandon Boatwright, associate professor of communications at Clemson University, notes that Ukrainian government agencies have skillfully used social media to give stories of Ukrainian resistance a distinctly violent tone.

In the first months of the Russian invasion, the official social media accounts of the Ukrainian government and the city of Kyiv focused largely on military developments, ranging from fundraising campaigns to urging users to express their opinions to Russia's official Twitter account. Other posts thanked the United States for its support. Ukrainian tweets have been directed against Russia and mostly focused on countering the Russian narrative or informing the public about various aspects of the war. Ukrainian Twitter is active on geopolitics, among other topics, with a focus on consolidating Western support, partnerships with foreign countries, pursuit of NATO membership, and UN integration. The importance of military assistance for Ukraine exists in both 2022 and 2023, with the latter year characterized by more detailed coverage of the specifics of expected military support from Western allies. Ukrainian Twitter focuses on military assistance, counteroffensive, peace initiatives and "Russian world", described by pro-Ukrainian supporters in a negative light.

== Rhetoric ==
Ukrainian officials and media portrayed Russia's attack as the beginning of a new world war, comparable to Nazi Germany's invasion of Poland in 1939. Ukrainian propaganda also compares Russian President Vladimir Putin to Adolf Hitler, calling him a "Putler," and Russian troops to the Nazis, calling them a mixture of Russians and fascists, "ruscists." Ukrainian propaganda calls the Russian military "orcs" and Russia "Mordor", a fictional land of evil in the books of The Lord of the Rings. The terms are used by Ukrainian senior officials, the military and the media, also appearing in reports of the Ministry of Defense. Ukrainian citizens can call the mayor of the city appointed by Russia a "gauleiter", and a collaborator a "polizei".

Due to the failures of Russian troops in the first days of the invasion, the Ukrainian media and other information sources began to spread optimistic rhetoric focused on several main points: the failure of the military action plan; the readiness of the Armed Forces of Ukraine to defend Ukraine and reach the Russian capital; demoralization, insufficient training, ineffective weapons and constant retreats of the Russian army, accompanied by significant losses; sanctions against Russia has a devastating effect on its economy.

Due to the fact that the Ukrainian army is much smaller than the Russian one, at the beginning of the conflict, Ukraine faced the need to maximize the narrative of Russia's defeat and present the Ukrainian army as the army that defeated the "second army of the world." This served as an important propaganda tactic known as psychological warfare. Ukrainians have turned the "second army of the world" into a curse word and a joke, thereby ridiculing the Russian army. At the beginning of Russian invasion, various Ukrainian resources actively distributed videos with the first Russian prisoners, forming a negative image of the Russian army, contradicting its image as professional and irresistible. The process of changing the image of the Russian soldier in the minds of Ukrainians was illustrated by "folk art", which from the first days of the war actively reflected Ukrainian public opinion regarding the Russian military. Official and private Ukrainian sources presented a new image of the soldiers, nicknamed "chmonyas". In the mass consciousness of Ukrainians, during the year of the war, such nicknames of the Russian military as "pig dogs", "orcs", "looters" and others also took root.

The Ukrainian government promotes the idea of Ukraine as a country fighting for freedom against a foreign aggressor. In line with this argument, Russia is presented as a dehumanized enemy for whom "lives mean nothing," which is evidence of psychological warfare whose goals are, among others, to call Russian society to action and build unity with trust in Ukrainian society. Ukrainian propaganda emphasized, among other things, war crimes, countering Russian propaganda and fakes, publishing informative messages, and pointing out the consequences of the war for the international community. The Ukrainian media produced publications devoted to exposing Russian propaganda themes, such as Ukraine's bombing of Donbas, the use of euphemisms for the war in Ukraine, and the existence of Ukrainian biolaboratories funded by the United States. Some pro-Ukrainian narratives were aimed at exposing Russian disinformation regarding the readiness for a peaceful resolution of the conflict.

Ukrainian scholars write that the country's "counter-propaganda" is destroying "propaganda mythologems" such as "concern for the population of the liberated territories" and "genocide of the Russian-speaking population". Ukrainian scholars write that the thesis that Ukraine is a Nazi state is refuted by the thesis that Russia is a fascist state using "the tactic of shifting the accusations of Russian propaganda to the accuser" and "appeal to authority." The last one is actively implemented by the Ukrainian side with the help of "counter-propaganda" involving international experts.

In comments to the Financial Times, a former Ukrainian senior official, on condition of anonymity, said that Ukraine in the fierce fighting for Bakhmut often used "counter-propaganda" aimed at maintaining an image of success, while Western countries argued that Bakhmut was not worth the huge losses. Ukrainian media referred to the settlement as "Fortress Bakhmut" and "indestructible".

According to Russian opposition political analyst Fyodor Krashenninikov, the key achievement of Ukrainian propaganda is its ability to attract the attention of audiences among the international Russian-speaking community, but its main problem is its focus on supporting Ukraine rather than fighting against the war. As a second important problem, Krashenninikov points out the internal contradiction of the propaganda, since, on the one hand, Russians are urged to overthrow Vladimir Putin and support Ukraine, but on the other hand they are called "slaves" with genetic abnormalities and subjected to various forms of dehumanization. The third significant aspect that characterizes the Ukrainian propaganda influencing Russians is its low quality, caused by a lack of understanding of the realities of Russian society.

Krashenninikov notes that, unlike Russian propaganda, Ukrainian propaganda tends to be more open in providing various information materials to the audience without a clear filter. This approach tends to provoke negative emotional reactions among Russian audiences, leading them to believe that it is more appropriate to show loyalty to their country than to be insulted and cursed by various Ukrainian sources, even if they take an anti-war and anti-Putin stance. Krashenninikov also criticizes Ukrainian journalists and propagandists for the fact that the words and phrases they use may be perceived with a different accent by Russian speakers in Russia.

== Disinformation ==
Ukrainian government has used various propaganda strategies aimed at both its own population and the international media to generate sympathy for Ukraine and hostility toward Russia. Since the beginning of the invasion, numerous fake news stories have appeared to boost the morale of the Ukrainian population and glorify its army, most of which have been amplified by official accounts of the Ukrainian state.

Ukrainian propaganda includes exaggerations and untruths, and many of its claims have been questionable or proven false. As an example of this, Forbes cites false claim by Ukrainian Minister Mykhailo Fedorov that the Moscow Exchange ceased to operate because of a cyberattack by IT Army of Ukraine. Laura Edelson, a computer scientist at New York University who studies disinformation, said that Ukraine is involved in "pretty classic propaganda" and that false information sometimes seeps into stories, which in general are even more numerous because of the war.

Ukrainian propaganda is widely present in the Western media, and Ukraine itself has also faced accusations that negative coverage of its activities is downplayed in the media. David Betz, professor of war in the modern world at King's College London, notes that Ukraine is flooding the web with fake information about the invasion, despite the Russians quickly exposing their fakes. According to Betz, Kyiv is capturing international opinion mainly because most Western media and governments amplify and repeat its narratives, despite the fact that Ukrainian propaganda is "fake and verifiably fake to anybody that has the gumption to do basic research". Vojtech Bagensky, an expert in security studies at Charles University, notes that Ukrainian propaganda chooses the "if you leave us alone, everyone here will die" rhetoric.

The analysis of Ukrainian scholars has shown that Ukrainian media in the mode of counter-propaganda and military censorship choose: selective video montage, relatively justified heroization, resistance to real facts, slander, silencing, concealment of their own losses, rationalization of arguments, consideration of audience sensitivity, strategic management, promotion of future development and well-being of Ukrainians, sacrifice for freedom, hyperbole, metonymy, proactivity and paranoia. In the Ukrainian media, manipulation is quantitative and includes aggrandizement, exaggeration, overestimation of national ideas and heroism. They are characterized by silencing as a small form of deception. Scholars note that Ukraine's manipulative counter-propaganda offers a deceptive picture of the world of war with a "charitable purpose".

According to Iryna Zolotar, an adviser and head of the communications department of former Ukrainian Defense Minister Oleksii Reznikov, at first an "optimism strategy" worked, which helped Ukrainians believe in themselves, but then it became the cause of a convoluted story in which inflated expectations don't correspond to reality. Zolotar notes that articles in the Ukrainian media describing the situation "not as good" as the official version were considered false.

=== "United News" telethon ===
Since February 2022, Ukrainians have gained access to the United News telethon, which has become a key tool of information warfare. After the start of Russian invasion of Ukraine, several Ukrainian TV channels united for the telethon. TV channels close to oligarch and former Ukrainian president Petro Poroshenko, such as Priamyi, 5 Kanal and Espresso TV, were disconnected from digital broadcasting while retaining the ability to broadcast via satellite, YouTube and other digital platforms, causing some difficulty in identifying those responsible for this action. The telethon provides up-to-date news from the frontline, provides the population with security advice and highlights the economic situation in Ukraine. The project gives the Ukrainian government the opportunity to quickly convey its messages to citizens. One of the priorities of the Ukrainian authorities after the liberation of the occupied territories is the restoration of TV towers to ensure access to United News for the local population, but Russia is resisting this.

"United News," while serving as a demonstration of the country's unity, has been widely criticized by the professional community for threatening pluralism and freedom of speech. Over time, its propaganda has acquired a character of poor quality and at a certain point even became harmful. The broadcasts of the telethon began to make deliberately false claims about the control of the situation, the impending victory, and the small losses among Ukrainians compared to those in Russia. While the true Ukrainian casualty figures were withheld, images of the destroyed buildings were not widely available.

After almost two years of war, interest in the program decreased due to Ukrainians' war fatigue. Critics claim that United News distorts the reality of war, keeping silent about events at the front and weakening Western support for Ukraine, and has become more of a mouthpiece for Ukrainian government than objective source. The telethon's trust ratings have declined in the last months of 2023 due to the evolution of its content and the perception of the program as political manipulation. Coverage of Ukraine's counteroffensive in 2023 also caused discontent, as it seemed too optimistic, despite the setbacks and failures that accompanied this period.

Media expert Igor Kulyas, analyzing telethon for the Ukrainian organization detector.media, noted that the participants of the show for most of 2023 focused on the "effectiveness and skill of the Ukrainian forces," while the Russian forces were described in an extremely negative light, which created a "completely different reality" compared to with the real situation on the ground. According to detector.media "dozens and hundreds" Ukrainian military consider the "United Marathon" to be "a world divorced from reality, which is fed to the Ukrainian audience."

=== Minimizing own losses ===
German historian Christian Hardinghaus notes that people tend to trust the state that has been attacked. In this regard, the media is dominated by the position of Ukraine, which is expressed in solidarity. However, in a war situation, both sides downplay their own losses and exaggerate enemy losses, which, according to Hardinghaus, reduces the objectivity of the assessment of events and can create the illusion that only one side is right.

A content analysis of the 15 most popular Ukrainian websites made by Ukrainian scientists showed that none of the national media reported either statistics or individual cases of mass deaths of Ukrainian military personnel in battle; instead, regional media, without observing state censorship, report the death of specific participants, indicating in most cases their personal information. Ukrainian scientists note that the state has to report losses using the media so as not to cause mass panic, depression or other negative psychological consequences. Thus, government authorities or their representatives use indirect or inaccurate reports of military losses, which require additional clarification. Ukraine has repeatedly cited figures that are "overtly speculative in nature". At the same time, the losses of the Russian side are regularly reported in reports and communiqués with exact figures. In July 2022, representatives of the Ukrainian Ministry of Defense explained the hushing up of losses by the need to disorient the Russians.

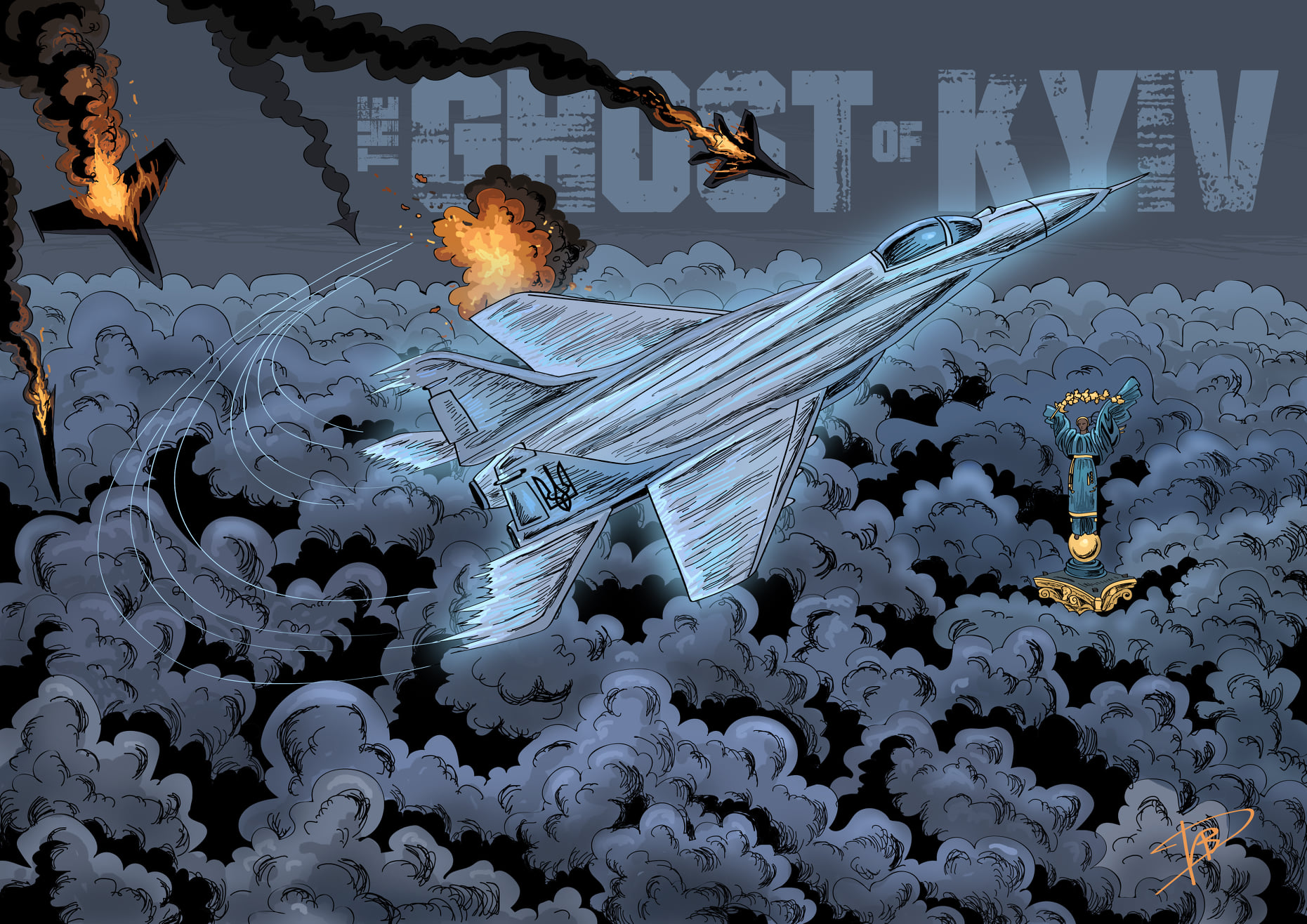
Ghost of Kyiv is a famous example of Ukrainian propaganda

== Media viruses and urban legends ==
Since Russian invasion of Ukraine, numerous heroic figures have emerged, including the enigmatic female sniper "Ugol," the guardians of Snake Island, the pilot of the "Ghost of Kyiv," and others who fought against Russian forces. Communications efforts at both the state and grassroots levels are supported by the creation of pro-Ukrainian content and memes that appeal to English-speaking audiences.

One of the famous disinformation stories debunked by experts concerned the Ghost of Kyiv, a fighter pilot to whom the Ukrainian government attributed the shooting down of several Russian fighter jets. By producing "historical figures" such as the Ghost of Kyiv, Ukrainian propaganda gives superpowers to the small Ukrainian army compared to the Russian army, citing the large amount of damage done to Russian forces. Another story, "Guardians of Serpent Island", tells of 13 Ukrainian border guards who were allegedly killed in "heroic resistance".

Saint Javelin

Several propaganda Internet memes have appeared in support of Ukraine, such as Saint Javelin and the song "Bayraktar". Saint Javelin represents the Virgin Mary dressed in blue-gold robes and holding a Javelin. It is an image adapted from a painting by American artist Chris Shaw. He based this painting on an earlier 2012 work in which Madonna is holding a Kalashnikov assault rifle.

Other famous memes include Chornobaivka, an airfield near Kherson periodically used for deployment of equipment by the Russian army; the stability of shelling of the airport by Ukrainian troops received wide coverage in social networks and Ukrainian media.

Also part of the propaganda was Patron, a Ukrainian service dog that gained international fame during the invasion, was awarded by President Zelenskyy and became the hero of dozens of artworks, including several murals.

Memes include "Ukrainian Tractor", which became popular due to the towing of destroyed or captured Russian military equipment. Such incidents (which included the hijacking of Russian military equipment by hooking it with a tractor) gave rise to the term "Tractor Troops".

In Ukraine, the Madonna of Kyiv, a photograph depicting a woman nursing her child while hiding in the Kyiv subway, has also become famous.

== Advertising and PR campaigns ==
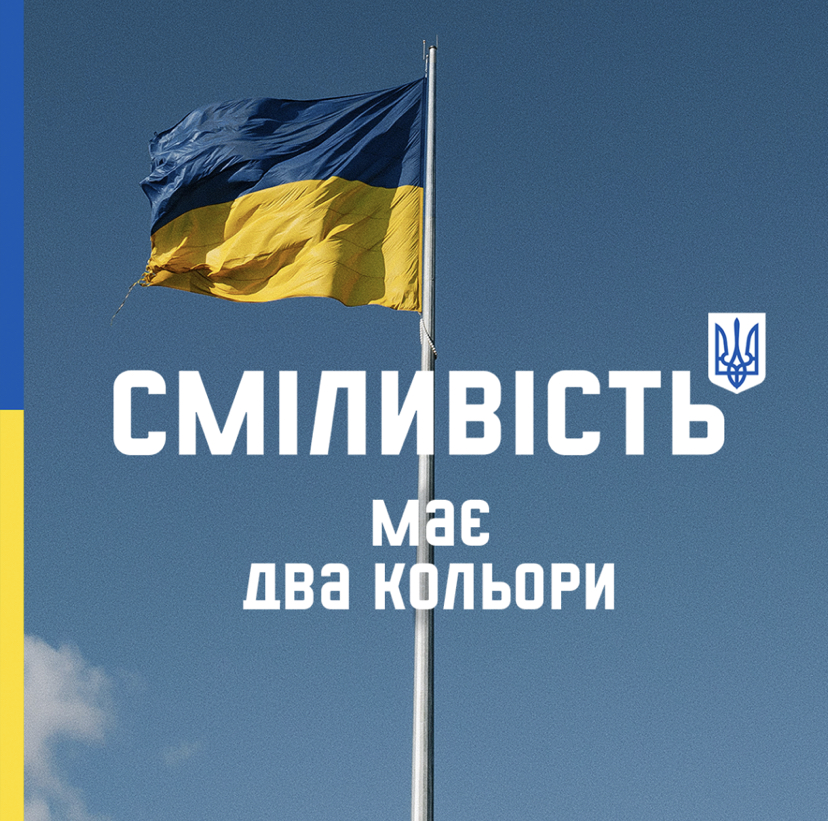
Poster which says "Courage has two colors"

=== Posters and billboards ===
Ukrainian propaganda is aimed at gaining sympathy, support and financial assistance to win war against Russia. Ukraine uses various forms of manipulation, including the creation of cinematic trailers and computer games, to shape certain perceptions in the mass consciousness. Institutions and many individuals use memes, videos, and animation to present their narrative to a wide audience, build international consensus among the user community, promote resistance, and support the morale of citizens.

Billboards reflecting various pro-Ukrainian patriotic and propaganda messages are common throughout Ukraine. In support of Ukraine, international artists, illustrators and designers create various propaganda posters, which are often used by authorities or other private individuals. They are distributed on social media and also printed for billboards. Pro-Ukrainian posters are not only carriers of certain ideas, but also a means of financial support for refugees and Ukrainian soldiers. The slogan "Stand with Ukraine", among others, has shaped the Ukrainian propaganda agenda, reflecting the ongoing invasion. Poster works with this slogan are used on both print and digital platforms (e.g. websites of the "Stand with Ukraine" campaign, the poster campaign of the Ukrainian Association of Graphic Designers "4th Block", the exhibition "Posterterritory").

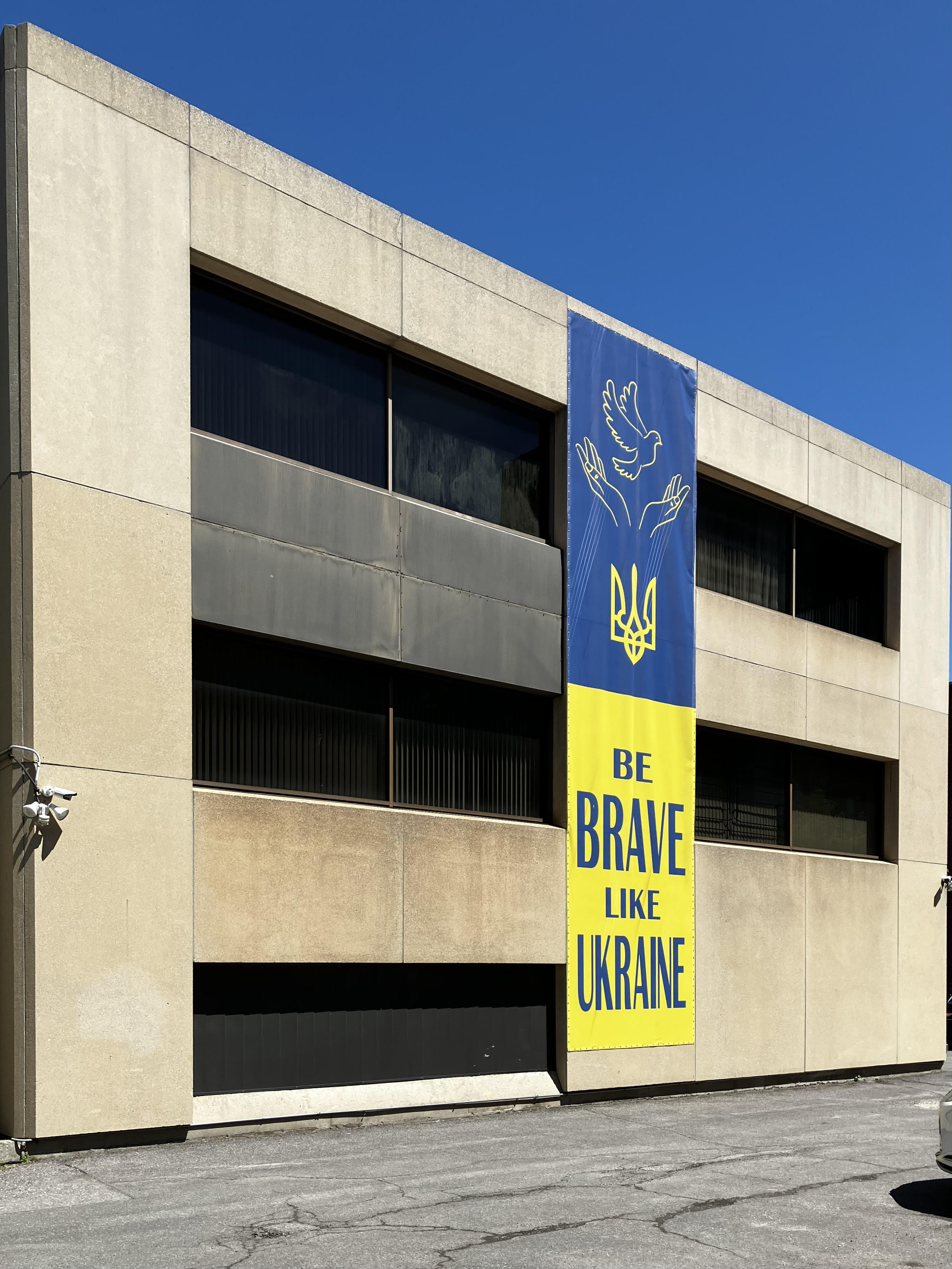
The propaganda billboard of the "Be Brave Like Ukraine" campaign hanging on the Embassy of Ukraine in Canada

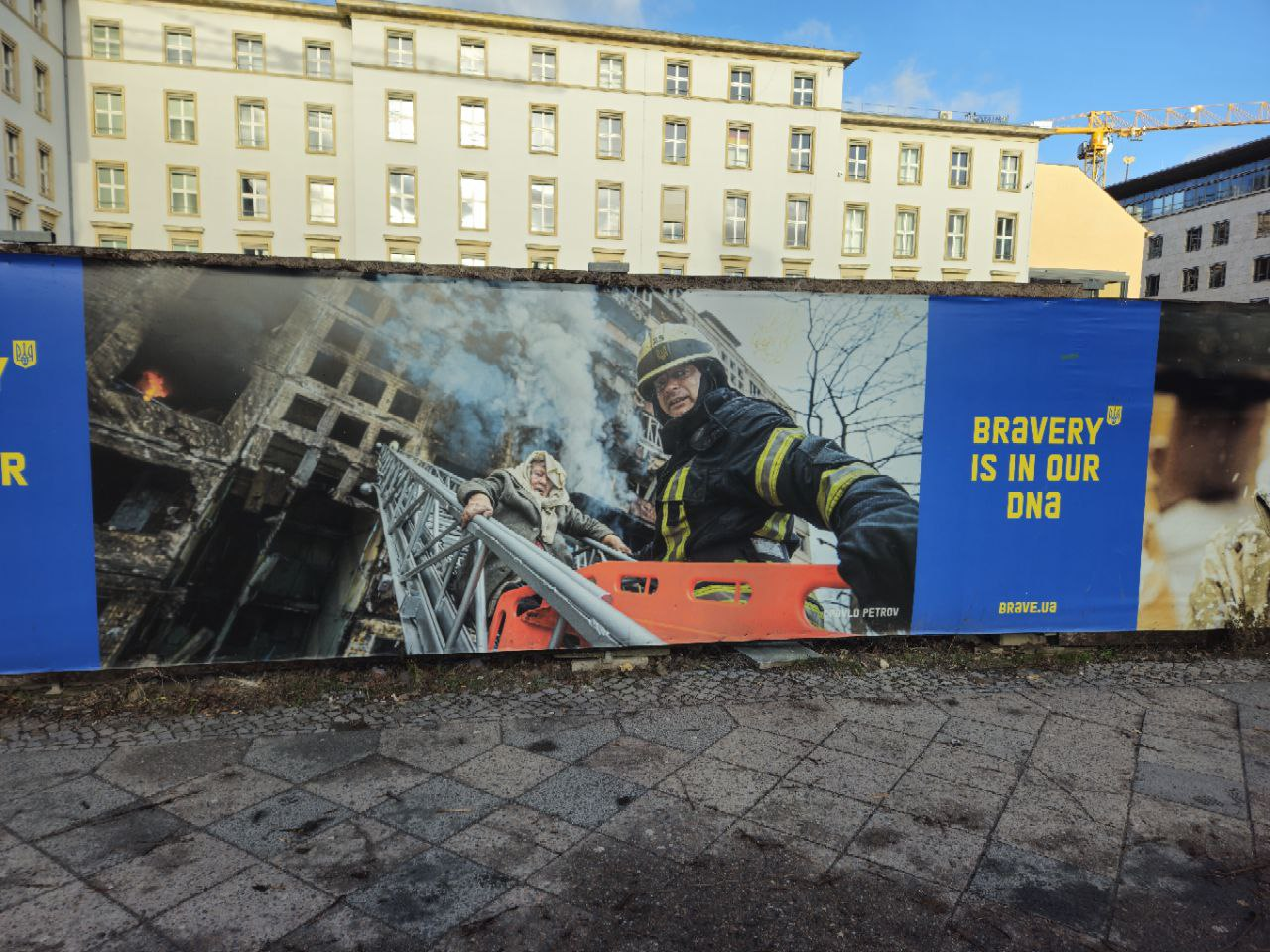
Ukrainian propaganda poster on a construction fence in Berlin

=== "Be Brave Like Ukraine" ===
In the midst of the Russian invasion, Ukraine launched an official national branding campaign. In February 2022, executives from the Ukrainian PR and advertising agency Banda presented the "Be Brave Like Ukraine" campaign to the Ukrainian government. In the following months, the agency produced billboards, posters and videos, social media postings, T-shirts and stickers.

According to Wired journalist Morgan Meeker, Banda managed to launch a large-scale international campaign at the very beginning of the war, built on the idea that "bravery is a national stereotype, a characteristic associated with belonging to Ukrainians. The word 'bravery,' written in the Banda agency's font and circled in blue and yellow on the sides, was displayed in Times Square in New York City and became the backdrop for a speech by British Prime Minister Boris Johnson in May [2022]." University of Denver professor Nadia Kaneva notes that Ukraine has turned nation-branding into "a new propaganda weapon, adapted for the age of consumer culture and constant media stimulation."

=== "PR Army of Ukraine" ===
A key element of the propaganda effort is an international legion of public relations firms working directly with the Ukrainian Foreign Ministry as part of the information war. According to the industry website PRWeek, the initiative was introduced by an individual who allegedly established a PR firm in Ukraine. In the first hours of the invasion, a non-profit organization called PR Army of Ukraine was established. The initiative involved hundreds of Ukrainian volunteers (mostly communications and public relations specialists) with the aim "to make Ukrainian voices more vocal in the world, tackle Russian propaganda, and support the reputation of Ukraine as an equal European democratic country".

At the end of February 2022, the Ukrainian Ministry of Foreign Affairs began actively engaging with Ukrainian PR agencies, London and PRCA to gain the support of communications professionals outside Ukraine. A dedicated government communications team set up a website, war.Ukraine.ua, providing key narratives and official channels for information and donations. Subsequently, PR specialist Rob Blackie launched a crowdfunding campaign to bring news about Ukraine to Russians using digital advertising that circumvents Russian government censorship. PRCA CEO Francis Ingham expressed appreciation for the opportunity to coordinate efforts in support of the Ukrainian government.

Many international PR agencies responded to the war by providing support to employees affected by the crisis. Firms such as Edelman, APCO Worldwide, Hill & Knowlton, Weber Shandwick, Ketchum Inc. and others expressed deep concern about the events and provided advice to clients on coping with the war. Some firms contributed funds to help refugees and supported their Ukrainian colleagues.

Over 150 communications agencies and their representatives expressed their willingness to provide active support to Kyiv in the information war. Some PR groups have coordinated with the Ukrainian government to provide free support, for example by matching freelancers with employers. PR groups are working to spread information about the war in Ukraine by using influential channels, fact-checking and enforcing key narratives, working with agencies, and providing assistance in various areas such as political communications, media relations, graphic design, video production, social media, and others.

International PR efforts are led by PR Network co-founder Nicky Regazzoni and leading PR consultant Francis Ingham, who has developed close ties with the UK government. Ingham has worked for the U.K. Conservative Party, served on the Strategy and Evaluation Board of the U.K. Government Communications Service, is executive director of the International Communications Consultancy and leads LG Comms, a membership body focused on local U.K. government communications issues.

In March 2023, PR Army of Ukraine introduced the Voices of Freedom platform to connect journalists and PR professionals with trusted speakers, opinion leaders and eyewitnesses. The platform provides access to a database of more than 80 approved speakers on various topics such as energy, security, ecology, food crisis, sanctions, nuclear threat, European integration, Ukrainian culture and history. Users are given the opportunity to check the qualifications of potential speakers and their reputation, as well as to combat disinformation and propaganda. PR Army has established relationships with international journalists and media outlets in 74 countries, working with more than 1,200 publications, including Forbes, The Washington Post, BBC, CNN and the Financial Times.

== Support of the United States ==
=== American lobbyists for Ukraine ===
Ukraine actively uses U.S. lobbying, public relations, and free legal aid services. U.S. lobbyists connect Ukrainian officials with Western individuals to assist in the war against Russia.

In March 2022, Politico published a story about the growing activity of U.S. lobbyists in the context of Russian invasion of Ukraine. A massive PR campaign organized by a network of PR specialists, lobbyists and former government officials was deployed during the war. This PR messaging machine had a significant impact on media coverage and shaping policy decisions. The media organization named Andrew Mack, an advisor to Zelenskyy since November 2019 and head of the Washington, D.C. office of Ukrainian law firm Asters, as one of the key members of this PR network. His role was to provide communications to the media on behalf of President Zelenskyy, giving significant weight to the Ukrainian position in American society. The New York Times cited Daniel Vajdich as another lobbyist, "who had been paid by the Ukrainian energy industry and a civil society nonprofit group, but is now working for free." Lobbyists like Vajdich have expressed hope that funds that would normally have been paid to their firms will be redistributed to the military and humanitarian needs of Ukrainians affected by the war.

The lobbying and communications company Your Global Strategy, co-founded by Shai Franklin and Michael Steiner, has been busy connecting Ukrainian officials with U.S. mayors and governors as part of efforts to support Ukraine in the conflict. Franklin said he has, among other things, actively worked with the Ukrainian presidential administration to organize virtual meetings between the mayors of Odesa and Kyiv and their U.S. counterparts. According to the U.S. Department of Justice, Your Global Strategy organized informal video calls between Kharkiv Mayor Ihor Terekhov and U.S. mayors such as Eric Adams (New York City), Michelle Wu (Boston) and Lori Lightfoot (Chicago). According to the Boston Herald, Terekhov asked Wu to support tougher sanctions against Russia. Lucas Jan Kaczmarek, a Maryland lawyer, reported to the U.S. Department of Justice his attempts to secure arms and other supplies for the Ukrainian Defense Ministry through diplomatic channels.

In addition to formal lobbyists and PR specialists, Zelenskyy's administration also maintained contacts with former government officials associated with the Biden administration. Among them were former US ambassador to Russia Michael McFaul and former US ambassador to Ukraine and senior director of the Atlantic Council's Eurasia Center John E. Herbst.

The PR initiatives of the Ukrainian side cover not only Washington, but also go beyond its borders. Strategic video calls between Zelenskyy and Mack, as well as support from the British Embassy in the United States, testified to multifaceted efforts to create a positive image of Ukraine in the global community. The lobbyists' actions led, among other things, to the imposition of sanctions on Russian oil and gas company Gazprom, which is responsible for organizing Nord Stream 2, as well as a ban on oil and gas imports from Russia, supported by Ukraine's oil and gas lobbyists.

Ben Freeman, a research fellow at the Quincy Institute for Responsible Statecraft, notes that lobbyists representing Ukraine's interests face minimal obstacles in the American political space. Due to the rejection of Russian clients by firms, the Russian lobby in the US is losing its activity. This is confirmed by the fact that members of Congress began to repeat the narratives put forward by the Ukrainian lobby. An important aspect of the Ukrainian lobby's influence was the phrase "Putin's weapon" used to describe the Nord Stream-2 project, which became popular during the period of sanctions against Gazprom.

=== Financing of Ukrainian media by USAID ===
The United States Agency for International Development (USAID) provided financial assistance to the Ukrainian government. The funds were used for digitalization, energy development, restoration of critical infrastructure, support for displaced persons and the agricultural sector. Since the beginning of Russia's invasion of Ukraine, USAID has funded, for example, the work of the center for assistance to combat participants, which provided legal and psychological services.

In February 2025, an investigation by The Free Press was published, claiming that the USAID was financing a propaganda machine in Ukraine. The main sponsor of the Ukrainian media was the non-governmental organization Internews, created with the assistance of USAID. In 2024, Internews' annual report stated that the company provided "comprehensive support" to 536 media outlets in Ukraine and trained more than 5,000 journalists. According to Oksana Romanyuk, Director General of the Institute of Mass Media, 90% of Ukrainian media survived thanks to grants, and 80% (or more) of Ukrainian media collaborated with USAID.

According to The Free Press, some Ukrainian media outlets supported by USAID often became the most active supporters of the government, which led to the discrediting of independent journalists. USAID provides financial support to military recruiters who kidnap men from the streets and torture them if they refuse to serve in the army.

According to the Spanish newspaper El Pais, over a hundred organizations in the field of culture and media in Ukraine lost their support after the freezing of programs by the USAID in early 2025. Independent media in Ukraine, which received grants and published materials often critical of the government, suffered due to the termination of funding. Entrepreneur and senior adviser to US President Donald Trump, Elon Musk, commented on this situation on Twitter: "Independent media. LOL".

== Cyberwar ==
Ukrainian cyber army is waging information warfare against the Russian narrative, launching cyberattacks on Russian facilities.

At the beginning of Russian invasion of Ukraine, Minister of Digital Transformation Mykhailo Fedorov initiated a campaign of "digital blockade" of Russia, urging international companies to leave the Russian market. He was also instrumental in creating the IT Army of Ukraine, a digital movement of about 100,000 people, including Ukrainian and Western IT specialists and hackers. The main goal of this movement is to wage a digital war against Russia. It is engaged in organizing political pressure campaigns abroad and spreading Ukrainian military propaganda (including in Western media and social networks) via social networks such as Telegram, VKontakte, Discord, and Reddit.

Pro-Ukrainian hackers have targeted Russian state media and various Kremlin-controlled websites, among others, to promote pro-Ukrainian propaganda. IT Army of Ukraine hacked Russian websites and shut down their operations, the hacks were used to play the Ukrainian anthem on Russian radio stations, and Russian TV channels displayed messages promoting an end to the war and claiming Russian guilt.

During the three days after the attacks on Kyiv began, Fedorov and his team stepped up efforts to mobilize support and resistance to the war effort. They launched a campaign to put pressure on U.S. technology companies in an effort to secure support for the Ukrainian Armed Forces. Parts of their strategy included collecting donations in cryptocurrency, securing access to Elon Musk's Starlink satellite internet service, and mobilizing IT Army of Ukraine volunteers to hack into Russian facilities. The Ministry of Digital Transformation has been restructured into a military organization coordinating activities through an official Telegram channel. The call for developers, designers, and security experts brought a massive response and, as of March 2022, over 300,000 people have joined the efforts of the IT Army of Ukraine.
