= Propaganda in Ukraine =

Propaganda in Ukraine has a long and complex history, spanning various periods and political events. In the context of modern Ukraine, since the independence in 1991, the development of Ukrainian propaganda has been accompanied by the evolution of propaganda strategies under Presidents Leonid Kravchuk, Leonid Kuchma, Viktor Yushchenko, Viktor Yanukovych, Petro Poroshenko, and Volodymyr Zelenskyy.

Modern propaganda in Ukraine in the context of information warfare is used to shape public opinion on issues such as the annexation of Crimea by Russia, the war in Donbas, and Russian invasion of Ukraine. In response to these events, both the Ukrainian government and opposition parties used propaganda to influence public opinion and garner support for their goals. This included campaigns to demonize the Russian government and armed forces, countering Russian propaganda, glorify Ukrainian nationalism and mobilize support for Ukrainian forces. During the war in Donbas, various communication agencies developed media and marketing projects to support national propaganda and narratives. Propaganda was also used to spread false information about the war in Ukraine and to discredit the opposition. In the context of describing the Russo-Ukrainian war, the phrase "Ukrainian counter-propaganda" is also used.

== Presidency of Leonid Kravchuk ==
Since Ukraine's independence in 1991, state-sponsored events have been dedicated to historical events. They, according to The New Yorker, usually take the form of commemorating departed heroes using impressive metal sculptures.

Nationalists, who occupied important positions in the structures of power, actively promoted ideas aimed at achieving the prosperity of the country. One of the key principles was the call for distancing from Russia, active integration into European structures with the confidence that this would solve internal and external problems.

In the early 1990s, the party-nomenclature elite adopted the ideological concepts of the Western Ukrainian elite and consistently implemented them. These ideas implied a strategic detachment from Russia in favor of European integration. Regional elites interested in politics, having started their careers in Kyiv, adapted their views to the ideological guidelines and ideas of representatives of the western regions, but they may not have had clear visions of the future development of the country.

== Presidency of Leonid Kuchma ==
With the arrival of Viktor Medvedchuk as head of the administration of President Leonid Kuchma, the concept of "temnik" appeared in Ukrainian journalism, which has been widely used since 2002. The "temniks" were detailed instructions for the media on how to cover political events in Ukraine. The "Detector Media" organization revealed that in subsequent years, the use of "temniks" became a more complex process, including post-information "temniks" aimed at clarifying the perspective of information presentation on the air. According to the testimonies of Ukrainian journalists, the influence of temniks on the content of the news became especially noticeable. After returning from the event, journalists received new instructions from the editorial office, which determined the perspective and nature of the coverage of the events. Another important stage in the development of the temnik system is associated with the time when the texts of materials began to be sent for proofreading outside the editorial office. This process led to an increased centralization of information content management and the approval of a certain view of events on the air.

On Slava Square in Kyiv, in the immediate vicinity of the presidential administration, there was an office with paramilitary guards, where, according to journalists, dungeons were formed and the actions of the editorial offices supporting the current government were coordinated. The period up to 2005 was characterized by the cooperation of TV channels with the government, which later developed into an opportunity to earn money for channels that talked about the positive aspects of the state's actions.

== Orange Revolution ==
Before the Orange Revolution, the theme of antisemitism was used in propaganda campaigns in Ukraine to discredit the opposition. Pro-government TV channels campaigned against "nashism" (from the name of Viktor Yushchenko's block "Our Ukraine") and the "orange plague." Anti-Semitic advertising materials became the reason for the closure of the opposition newspaper Silski Visti.

“Agenda” of the Orange Revolution began to form long before start of Ukraine's presidential campaign. Important role was played by TV Channel 5, TV company Era, and national newspapers “Ukraina moloda”, “Bez tsenzury”, “Pravda Ukrainy”, “Selskie vesti”, as well as many regional papers from central and western Ukraine and many internet media. Their campaign focused on “non-intrusive” problems. Legal expert Sergey Mirzoev notes that pro-Yushchenko media promoted slogans like “Government is criminal”, “Yanukovych is choice of authorities”, “Yanukovych is not legitimate”. Historian Sergey Kozlov lists several campaigns:

1. Campaign to discredit current government. It claimed that ruling regime was corrupt and authoritarian. It used Yushchenko's message from 2002 elections: no economic crisis, no political crisis, no spiritual crisis, only crisis of power.
2. Campaign to discredit candidate Viktor Yanukovych. Main slogan was “We don't want criminal president”. His victory was shown as change from bad power to very bad power. His past convictions were linked with “criminal” Donetsk business and threat of corporate raids.
3. Campaign to create belief that authorities would use administrative pressure and falsify election results. Kozlov writes that this image became a self-fulfilling prophecy.
4. Campaign presenting Yushchenko as “people’s president”. It used image of Europe as opposite to present situation and as positive future, linking political groups and leaders with “European choice” and European integration.

At the same time, pro-government propaganda, as historian Kozlov notes, was quite successful in the eastern and southern regions of Ukraine. A key role was played by Yanukovych's promise to give the Russian language the status of a second state language. His campaign focused on the work of his government to solve “intrusive” problems — showing success in reducing unemployment, raising pensions, and supporting economic growth. But the messages about success did not match the everyday experience of many people, who still had many “intrusive” problems that economic growth did not solve. Attempts by pro-government media to discredit Yushchenko by accusing him of nationalism were also unsuccessful.

== Presidency of Viktor Yuschenko ==
Following the rise to power of Viktor Yushchenko in 2005, the office responsible for temyky (directive bulletins) was closed, the management of the state television channel was dismissed, and attempts were made to restore journalistic standards among correspondents who had worked under censorship.

After 2005, Ukraine experienced a temporary period of cohabitation between President Yushchenko and Prime Minister Yulia Tymoshenko, which provided television channels with a unique opportunity to monetize their content. Unlike the previous period, when the authorities used their position without paying for the placement of materials, television channels now began to earn money for positive coverage of pro-government actions.

In 2007, themes of antisemitism were again used in propaganda, this time with the aim of discrediting Viktor Yushchenko and Ukrainian nationalism. Propaganda efforts focused not only on discrediting individual politicians but also on criticizing state policy, sometimes taking on an anti-Ukrainian direction.

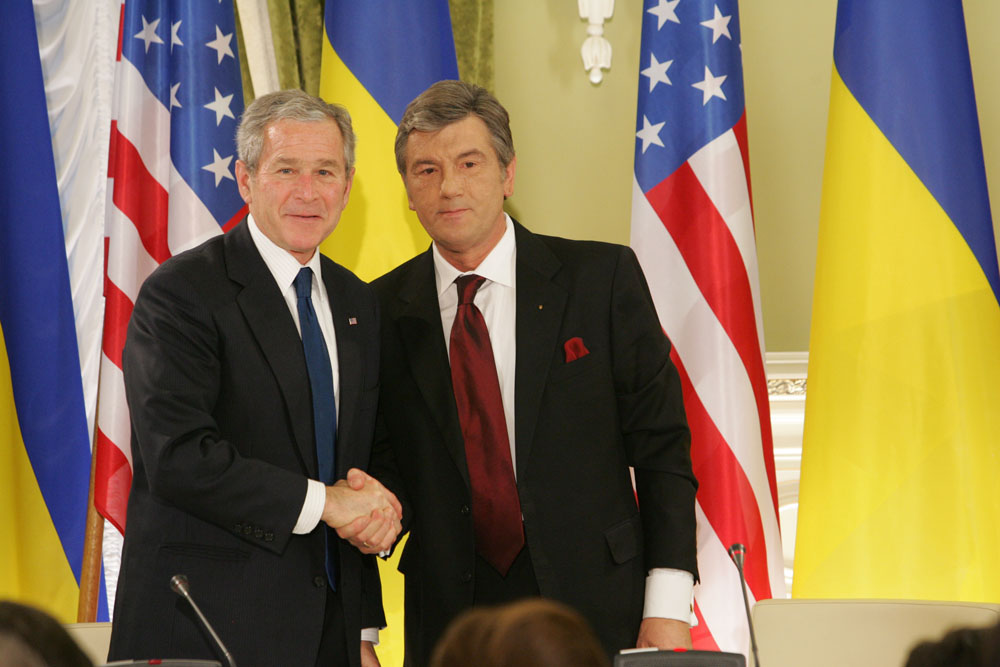
Ukrainian president Viktor Yushchenko with U.S. president George W. Bush, March 2008

During Viktor Yushchenko's presidency, active state propaganda was observed in Ukraine, aimed at influencing public opinion in the context of geopolitical and strategic events. This period saw an attempt to centrally use the state propaganda machine and corresponding media to promote political priorities. Propaganda efforts were oriented towards creating a patriotic mood, building support for the idea of Ukraine's accession to NATO, and actively promoting membership in the World Trade Organization (WTO). The NATO accession campaign, which lacked broad public support, continued to be actively promoted at the state level, including with support from the United States. At the same time, the issue of WTO membership was also introduced into the information discourse, although public interest in this topic was limited. Journalist Vitaly Portnikov notes that under Yushchenko, "there was propaganda that Ukraine could easily manage without coordinating its actions with Russia".

Ideologically, during Yushchenko's presidency, propaganda actively raised themes of the Holodomor, the Ukrainian language, and Russophobic issues. During Viktor Yushchenko's rule, several countries, including Hungary, Latvia, and Georgia, recognized the Holodomor as an act of genocide against the Ukrainian people. Some Russian political scientists noted that Kyiv's propaganda efforts were successful, especially in Eastern European countries and some post-Soviet states that had tense relations with Russia, but, nevertheless, in broader international contexts, the successes in the struggle for the recognition of the Holodomor as genocide were less significant.

According to Vitaly Tretyakov, Dean of the Higher School of Television at Moscow State University, Russia, showing loyalty to the Ukrainian authorities during the presidencies of Kravchuk, Kuchma, and Yushchenko, "received from Ukraine: constant and purposeful de-Russification and the actual trampling of the rights of Russians in Ukraine; constantly ongoing anti-Russian propaganda and policy, both within Ukraine itself and in the international arena; a systematically implemented project to turn the Black Sea into an internal lake of NATO and the USA with the maximum displacement of Russia from here."

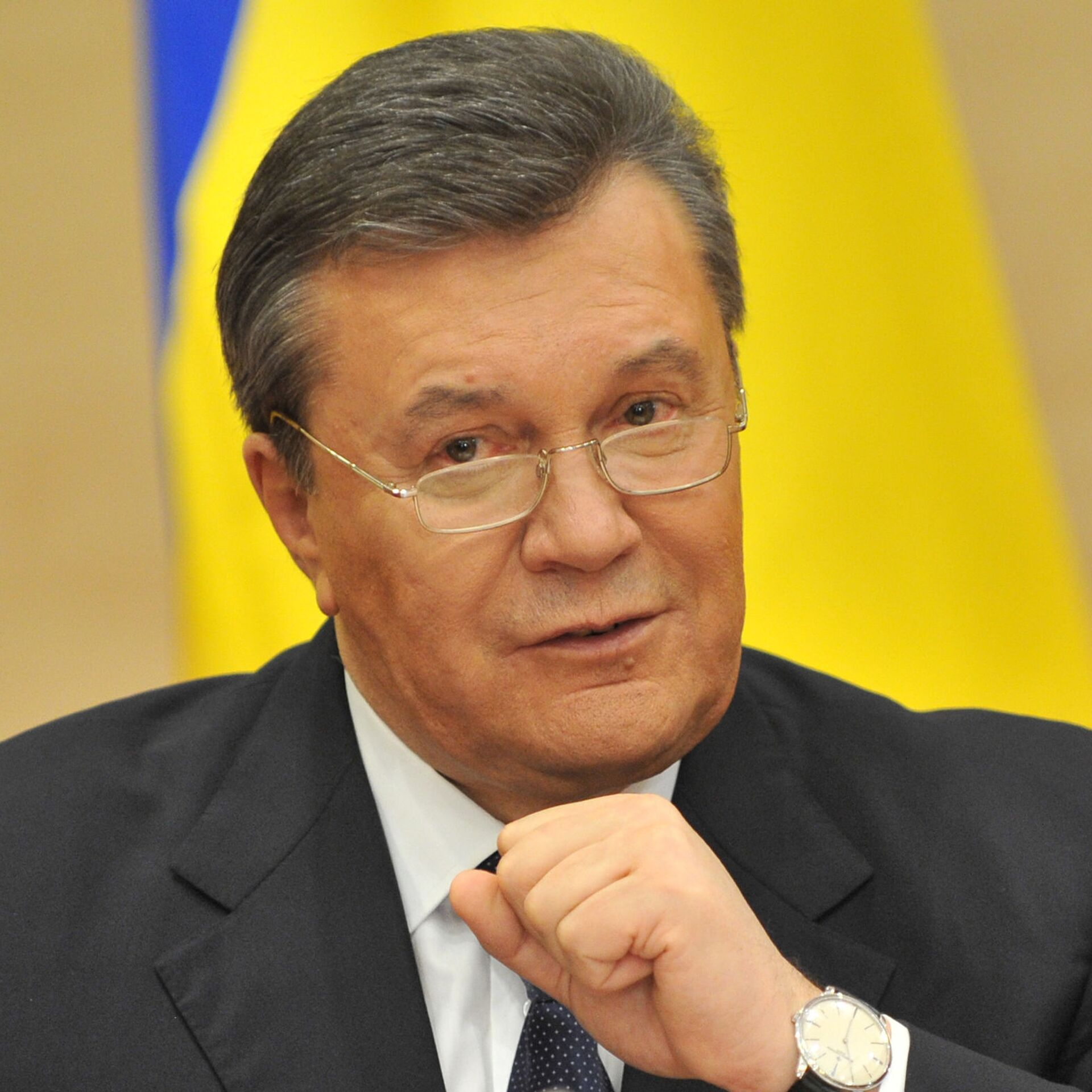
Viktor Yanukovych during a press conference in Rostov-on-Don after his removal from power in Ukraine, February 28, 2014

== Presidency of Viktor Yanukovych (2010–2014) ==
After his election in 2010, Ukraine's fourth president, Viktor Yanukovych, attempted to restore the temyky system; however, this time communication was established through loyal managers who were given instructions by phone and in meetings, through owners or political technologists. This approach to content management remained relevant during the presidency of Petro Poroshenko.

Under Yanukovych, a radicalization of public confrontation over issues of culture, language, and identity was observed. The authorities used political technologists to shape a strategy to present the opposition as national-radical and extremist.

Under Yanukovych, negotiations began on the possibility of signing the Association Agreement between Ukraine and the European Union. Propaganda surrounding the Association was conducted, including at the level of state structures. Parallel to this, Ukraine, in particular through certain media and individual politicians, expressed support for the idea of joining the Customs Union. In November 2013, President Yanukovych declined to sign the association agreement with the EU in Vilnius on the initiative of Prime Minister Mykola Azarov's government. Subsequently, an agreement was reached between Yanukovych and Russian president Vladimir Putin, and Ukraine dropped its requirement for Customs Union membership. Throughout 2013, there was a constant discourse in Ukrainian society about the confrontation between the interests of Russia and the West, which was reflected in the public choice between the Association and the Customs Union. Journalist Vitaly Portnikov notes that under Yanukovych, the narrative of friendly and brotherly relations with Russia was promoted.

In the spring of 2013, an intensification of an antisemitic propaganda campaign aimed at discrediting the Ukrainian democratic opposition was observed in Ukraine. During this period, alleged provocations were recorded, carried out using the symbols and coordinates of the political party All-Ukrainian Union "Svoboda" and allied organizations.

== Euromaidan events (2013–2014) ==
During the Euromaidan, a flag of Europe with the Ukrainian coat of arms was used

During and after the Euromaidan, the active use of social media and the digital mobilization of activists contributed to the widespread use of digital communication. The works of pro-European protesters included elements from the painting Liberty Leading the People with various symbolic items of clothing, such as helmets, flags around the neck, and posters. The slogan "Ukraine is Europe" was also translated into English for communication with Western countries. The work culminates in the central figure of Marianne wearing elements of Ukrainian clothing and a Central European flag, emphasizing the symbolism and connection to the Euromaidan. Pro-European propaganda at the Euromaidan was used by various political and ideological groups. The word "Eurorevolution", used to varying degrees by protest participants in Ukraine, is strongly associated with the pro-European movement sparked by the suspension of the Association Agreement with Europe and can be directed both against a specific political classification and against cultural heritage.

The Euromaidan network project on the Facebook platform, which became a symbol of the protests and unrest, did not limit itself to traditional methods of mobilizing the population. The project introduced new methods of influence to the public, such as streaming television, artistic short films, public lectures by prominent figures, performances by artists, the publication of secret documents, and much more. All these methods consolidated the public, turned a significant portion of the people against the government, and sustained the protesters' "morale". Being more reactive and large-scale than the government's information activities, these network projects significantly contributed to the coup in Ukraine. They were at the heart of events, "hit the mark," and enjoyed greater trust among the active population, which became one of the factors contributing to the political coup in Ukraine.

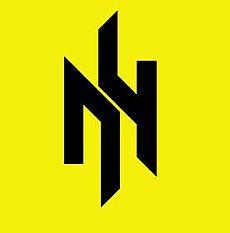
Alternative logo of the "Patriot of Ukraine" organization: a runic monogram of the letters "П" and "У"

Red-and-black flag

During the protests, nationalist slogans such as "Glory to Ukraine!" and "Glory to the Heroes!" as well as "Death to the enemies!" were heard. The emergence of hostile narratives and justifications was facilitated by various propaganda symbols used by Ukrainian far-right groups. Although the founders of most of these groups adhered to neo-Nazi ideology and symbolism, after 2014, there was a move away from radicalism, which changed the semantics of most symbols, including the "Wolfsangel" rune, which is central to the "Idea of the Nation" concept. The neo-Nazi organization "Patriot of Ukraine" developed an alternative logo, which is a monogram of the Cyrillic letters "П" and "У". The nationalist party "Svoboda" changed its symbol from one with runic and neo-Nazi roots to a three-fingered hand, reflecting a connection to the national Tryzub. Another symbol associated with the far right and Ukrainian nationalism is the red-and-black flag, linked to the leader of the Ukrainian Insurgent Army and the OUN-B, Stepan Bandera, presented in various versions.

Gradually moving closer to NATO and the EU, the Ukrainian pro-Western elite caused discontent in the Kremlin, which viewed it as a potential "anti-Russian" neighbor.

One of the projects, named "Кожен з нас" , was developed by the agency "Banda" for the Ukrainian army. This project will be analyzed within the research to examine how the state and private sectors collaborated, as well as to study certain symbols present in Ukrainian military propaganda.

== Presidency of Petro Poroshenko (2014–2019) ==
Following the Euromaidan, Ukrainian oligarchs retained significant influence in Ukraine's political process. Major political players in the country actively invested in various self-promotion campaigns, including "black" PR campaigns targeting their opponents, to strengthen their positions. Similar to the political landscape, the Ukrainian media market has long been under the control of oligarchs. Over 75% of the TV broadcasting space is divided among four media groups owned by oligarchs. The "Intermedia" group, which includes the TV channel Inter, is controlled by oligarch Dmytro Firtash and former head of Yanukovych's presidential administration Serhiy Lyovochkin. Another channel, 1+1, belongs to oligarch Ihor Kolomoyskyi, who also controls a number of other channels and the news agency UNIAN. Viktor Pinchuk, a businessman and son-in-law of former president Kuchma, plays a significant role in the media space as the owner of TV channels ICTV, STB, and Novyi Kanal. Oligarch and President of Ukraine from 2014 to 2019, Petro Poroshenko, controls 5 Kanal.

=== Annexation of Crimea ===
The events of 2014, such as the annexation of Crimea, the flight of pro-Russian president Viktor Yanukovych, and the Euromaidan, led to instability in Eastern Europe. In the period after Yanukovych's flight to Russia, Ukrainian television journalism underwent significant changes. The Euromaidan events, widely followed by the national audience, led to an increased demand for informational content, which stimulated the emergence of new TV channels and the reformatting of existing ones.

In 2014, a working version of a cybersecurity strategy appeared in Ukraine, while the Ukrainian information security doctrine, adopted in 2009 by a decree of the president of Ukraine, had become outdated, and the assessment of the likelihood of an information war against Ukraine was insufficient. As a result, the state lacked effective mechanisms to respond to threats and was unprepared to counter them. The Annexation of Crimea by Russia highlighted Ukraine's weakness and the need to address these shortcomings. Security and defense structures became the first object of reforms, and the importance of strategic communications in countering hybrid threats was also recognized.

With the loss of Crimea in 2014, Ukraine actively used its image as an aggrieved victim, promoting its position as a country defending its rights. Following the annexation of Crimea by Russia, the United States and the Western world supported Ukraine's communication and information strategy, which marked a significant success in garnering sympathy and support from the West. Stories of the military resistance of Ukrainian army soldiers against Russian attacks, as well as stories of civilians fleeing their homes and cities, made headlines in Western media. As a result, Western public opinion sympathized with the Ukrainian nation. In 2014, Ukraine responded to the Russian attack on Ukrainian identity and values with a counter-narrative expressed in the slogan "Heaven does not permit slaves. Glory to the heroes." This call became a rallying cry for Ukrainian protesters during the Euromaidan in 2014. While emphasizing Ukraine's resilience and determination, this version of national identity also deepened the historical and cultural rift between Russian-speakers in the eastern provinces and Ukrainian-speakers in the west of the country. This narrative division complicated Ukraine's attempts to form a modern, unified national identity and set of values for a foreign audience.

Petro Poroshenko, who became President of Ukraine after the Maidan events of 2013–2014, placed particular emphasis on combating Russian propaganda. The tactics included suppressing media considered anti-Ukrainian in the country, introducing new requirements for the use of the Ukrainian language in media, and conducting various projects aimed at fostering patriotism. Under Poroshenko's leadership, the glorification of Ukrainian nationalist movements that participated in World War II also intensified in Ukraine.

=== Rhetoric used to describe the war in Donbas ===
During the war in Donbas, Russian media referred to Ukrainian military personnel as "fascists" and "Nazis," while Ukrainian media called the Russian-backed militants "terrorists" and "separatists." Ukraine used imagery of Ukrainian soldiers and the national flag to link its actions to heroism. Ukrainian media selectively presented information about the Russian government and military actions to create a negative image of them (Russian media engaged in the same practice from the opposite perspective). Ukrainian propaganda was used as a means to counter Russian rhetoric and to legitimize Ukraine's actions, seeking support from the nation and the international community.

By emphasizing crimes committed by the Soviet Union in Ukraine, Ukrainian propaganda aims to expose the repressive nature of the regime attributed to modern Russia and to highlight a national identity for Ukrainians that is distinct from Russians. Thus, the use of historical material allows Ukrainian propaganda to contextualize the war with Russia. By highlighting past grievances and injustices, Ukrainian propaganda seeks to garner internal and international sympathy and support for Ukraine's struggle for independence, territorial integrity, and self-determination.

Ukraine used the term "Russian world" to reflect the "cruelty" of the Russian authorities and armed forces, aiming to discredit Russia and the values it promotes. In the context of countering the "brotherly people" metaphor, Ukrainian propaganda creates a distinct identity and history for the country that is different from the history of Russia. Ukrainian authorities sought to distance Ukraine from Russia, resulting in the latter's image transforming from that of a "brotherly people" to an "aggressor state" and "enemy." Nationalism thrives in Ukraine, serving as the antithesis to the "brotherly people" idea. Scholars argue that the real cause of these events is Ukraine's pro-European policy, which has divided the two nations. At the same time, the Ukrainian side "deceitfully" uses the "brotherly people" metaphor so that Russia would supply cheap gas in exchange for its European integration.

Propaganda was particularly directed at Russian president Vladimir Putin; one of the most common expressions used against him is the neologism "Putler", a portmanteau of the surnames Putin and Hitler. Some images from this propaganda contain strong references to Nazi ideology, using corresponding slogans and symbolism.

During the war in Donbas, the Ukrainian side released a number of propaganda films dedicated to the military actions in the east of the country, such as "Cyborgs" and "Donbass".

=== Ministry of Information Policy ===
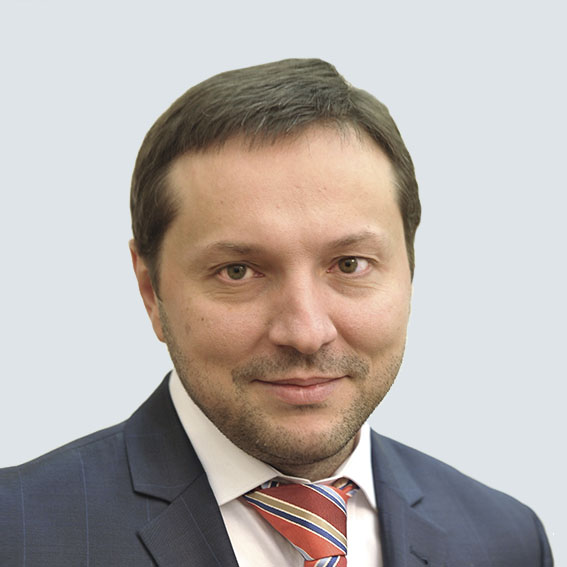
Ukrainian journalist Yuriy Stets

Aiming to counter Russian information influence in the southeastern regions of Ukraine and the Crimean Peninsula, the Ministry of Information Policy was established in Ukraine in December 2014, headed by journalist and official Yuriy Stets. The task of this body was to shape new narratives, define the information agenda, and disseminate necessary information through traditional media channels and by engaging with a large number of loyal bloggers on social networks. The ministry created the website i-army.org, where, after registration, "every Ukrainian can contribute to the fight against Russia on the information front". Upholding the slogan "The best propaganda is the truth," the Ministry of Information of Ukraine organized regular briefings for the media, provided Ukrainian and Western media with access to conflict zones, ensured the broadcast of television and radio programs to the occupied territories, and created news programs in the Crimean Tatar language.

The creation of the ministry was criticized by many experts, as it could potentially restrict freedom of speech. According to Vasyl Filipchuk, chairman of the Board of the Ukrainian International Center for Policy Studies, if Ukrainian propaganda spreads information that does not correspond to reality, then the ministry's existence loses its meaning and its liquidation would be a correct step.

In December 2014, the National Public Broadcasting Company of Ukraine and its subsidiary "Ukrainian Radio World Service" took steps to broadcast in the Russian language on the territory of the Russian Federation and Ukraine to present a pro-Ukrainian version of events related to Ukraine to a wider audience of listeners.

The doctrine of media security was being developed within the Ministry of Information Policy. In January 2015, the ministry announced the "Internet Army" project – a volunteer initiative aimed at "repelling Russian occupiers in the information war." According to Ukrainian media reports, nearly 40,000 people registered with the ministry as "information soldiers." However, interlocutors from the Ukrainian fact-checking organization StopFake told researchers that the "army" did not really exist, as volunteers received no specific tasks, thus the project's effectiveness is considered highly questionable.

In February 2015, the Ministry of Information Policy announced the formation of the "Information Troops of Ukraine" – a state volunteer organization engaged in counter-propaganda and refuting false claims about Ukraine, responding to Russian accusations, systematically analyzing Russian pro-government media such as RT, Lenta.ru, RIA Novosti, Life, comparing information presented in pro-government media with materials from pro-government groups on social networks, and analyzing popular news or specially created and widely disseminated messages. Another manifestation of the fight against Russian propaganda is the Russian-language program "Antizombi" on the ICTV channel, which aims to track and combat Russian propaganda and provocative fakes.

The press center of the Joint Forces Operation of the Ukrainian Armed Forces (known until May 2018 as the information service of the Anti-Terrorist Operation) also functions, responsible for coordinating military information in the combat zone.

=== Media for the international community ===
Recognizing the need to counter Russia's highly negative and manipulative statements, Ukraine began in early 2015 to create its own internationally oriented media and fact-checking platforms, such as Ukraine Today and StopFake.

In March 2014, journalist Yevhen Fedchenko together with colleagues and students from the Kyiv-Mohyla Academy School of Journalism helped found the fact-checking service StopFake to "debunk piece by piece" Russian disinformation and fake news. Shandra helped organize the English-language online newspaper Euromaidan Press to try to offer foreign audiences articles written by Ukrainians.

The Ministry of Information Policy took active measures to strengthen the country's international broadcasting. In November 2015, deputies of the Verkhovna Rada passed a law on international broadcasting, leading to the creation of the foreign-language television and radio company Ukraine Tomorrow. The channel was later renamed UATV, and its programming became targeted at the Ukrainian diaspora and Russian-speaking viewers outside Ukraine. Compared to the Russian international channel RT, UATV's popularity is significantly lower, as seen from social media data. Despite not being a serious competitor to RT, UATV demonstrated positive development dynamics, increasing its presence in various regions such as Europe, Africa, and the Middle East. Satellite television is also intended for residents of Crimea, Donbas, and Russia. Its goal is to present the Ukrainian version of the events of the war and promote the reforms being implemented.

=== "Myrotvorets" ===
In May 2016, the website "Myrotvorets", linked to the Ukrainian government, published the personal data of thousands of journalists who had received accreditation from Russian-backed separatists in eastern Ukraine. "Myrotvorets" labeled the journalists "accomplices of terrorists." The site called for an open campaign against the journalists. Ukrainian officials, including Interior Minister Arsen Avakov, praised the site's activities, expressing support and pointing to the need to fight "occupation forces." The publication of personal data and doxing on the "Myrotvorets" site were condemned by Western journalists, the Committee to Protect Journalists, and the ambassadors of the Group of Seven countries.

=== Strategic Communications ===
Since the beginning of 2014, Ukrainian authorities have been actively developing strategic communication strategies with significant support from the West. Throughout this process, all sectors of society, state bodies, and non-governmental organizations have worked in a coordinated manner. Ukraine's efforts in strategic communications have played a key role in countering Russia. For a successful information war against Russia, it was necessary not only to react but also to actively engage, overshadowing Russian narratives with Ukraine's own messages.

Over the years, especially since 2015, Ukraine has actively cooperated with NATO in the field of strategic communications. NATO provides support to government agencies and civil society organizations, while actively facilitating the implementation of the "roadmap" for strategic communication partnership between Ukraine and NATO. Ukraine also cooperates with the NATO Strategic Communications Centre of Excellence, located in Riga. NATO's cooperation with Ukraine on strategic communications includes training, workshops, informational visits abroad, and other events.

In 2015, Ukraine began developing an information security framework, drawing on NATO concepts. The main focus was on coordinating, integrating, and synchronizing the activities of state structures and civil society. The goal was to create and disseminate national narratives tailored to different target audiences. In 2018, the head of the NATO Information and Documentation Centre in Ukraine, Barbora Maronková, in an interview with "Ukrinform," emphasized that strategic communications require coordinated positions and a "single voice."

In April 2016, a dictionary of strategic communications terms was presented. The tasks of its publishers were to increase the awareness and professionalism of Ukrainian information department employees, introduce Western-developed strategic communications into the structure of the Ukrainian state apparatus, and effectively counter Russian information influence.

With financial support from the British government, consultants from The Communication Reform Group conducted training for Ukrainian experts so they could subsequently transfer the necessary knowledge to Ukrainian officials. With active support from the International Bank for Reconstruction and Development and the World Bank, a special manual titled "Strategic Communications" was published to improve officials' literacy in the field of propaganda and information warfare.

In 2017, President Petro Poroshenko approved the Information Security Doctrine of Ukraine, which defines key directions for strengthening the country in the information sphere, including strategic communications. The concept of strategic communications was introduced into Ukrainian legislation and integrated into the Information Security Doctrine. The doctrine contains a detailed overview of various threats from Russia, including information operations aimed at weakening defense capabilities and destabilizing the situation, discrediting Ukraine's image, expanding information infrastructure on its territory, Russian information dominance in the occupied territories, spreading calls for radical actions, and supporting isolationist and separatist concepts of regional cooperation. The list of threats also included problems such as the ineffectiveness of information policy and insufficient development of national information infrastructure.

In 2017, the East StratCom Task Force EUvsDisinfo created an informal working group with the Ukrainian government to provide assistance in defining strategic communications and supporting Ukrainian media. Several projects under the auspices of the EU were also implemented to address Ukraine's communication challenges, including the EU's "Myth-Busters" Twitter channel, the "Disinformation Review," and the "Russian Language News Exchange in Prague," where journalists from different countries publish their work in Russian, collaborate on investigating disinformation, and share their findings. The EU Delegation to Ukraine is also actively engaged in disseminating information about the EU, ensuring active interaction with civil society, and supporting media freedom.

According to the results of many studies, civil society and the media, in addition to official efforts, have made a significant contribution to the development of strategic communications in Ukraine. This was made possible by close and effective interaction between state bodies and the civil sector. Organizations such as StopFake, the Hybrid Threats Analysis Group of the Ukraine Crisis Media Center, "Detector Media," and Texty.org.ua actively cooperate with Ukrainian authorities to counter Russian propaganda and have also played a significant role in Ukraine's strategic communications.

=== Avoidance of media coverage on certain topics ===
An analysis by "Detector Media" notes that, similar to the period from 2014 to 2017, there was an increase in the number of lists of individuals whose names became unacceptable to mention, as well as an expansion of the list of taboo topics on television. For example, some Ukrainian channels completely avoided mentioning events such as the Poisoning of Alexei Navalny or the protests in Belarus, while other channels covered these topics with certain manipulations. The organization's monitoring also shows that in 2017, the main Ukrainian political forces began actively accumulating media resources ahead of elections, leading to the launch of new channels and the acquisition of existing ones in the interests of various political camps. In 2018, it became known that all media groups, except for the "1+1" channel, portrayed Petro Poroshenko's actions in a positive or neutral light; however, "1+1", after a dispute between Poroshenko and oligarch Ihor Kolomoyskyi, became more critical of the government and Poroshenko himself.

According to a February 2017 study by the Ukrainian public organization Institute of Mass Information, Ukrainian print and online media raised the topic of the "cult of Bandera" in Ukraine, and some materials were dedicated to the theme "Kyiv is fueling the war in Donbas"; mainly, such propaganda narratives were spread by pro-Russian Ukrainian media.

=== Bans ===
Ukraine implemented a number of measures against Russian media, including a ban on the broadcasting of Russian TV channels in 2014 and restrictions on the entry of several Russian journalists in 2016. In 2017, Ukraine also took counter-propaganda measures against Russian propaganda by restricting access to a number of Russian websites and social networks, including one of the most popular social networks in the country, VKontakte, as well as Odnoklassniki, Mail.ru, and Yandex. Similar to the blocking of Russian TV channels in the country, this legislation was part of Ukraine's sanctions against Russia. Petro Poroshenko acknowledged the state's attempt to use social networks to fight the Russian "hybrid war".

The State Committee for Television and Radio Broadcasting of Ukraine actively implemented policies glorifying new heroes of Ukraine and introduced a ban on "anti-Ukrainian" literature that contradicted the government's ideology. This ideological censorship also affected recognized works by Western authors. In January 2018, Ukraine attracted international attention by banning the award-winning book "Stalingrad" by British historian Antony Beevor due to one paragraph describing the activities of a Ukrainian unit involved in the murder of 90 Jewish children during World War II. In December, the book "The Book Thieves" by Swedish writer Anders Rydell was banned for mentioning that troops loyal to Symon Petliura participated in the killing of Jews.

=== Education sphere ===
In October 2016, Ukrainian president Petro Poroshenko, in a speech to history students at Taras Shevchenko National University of Kyiv, called on students to join the "hybrid war" against Russia using not only academic but also popular historical genre books. The "LіkBez. Historical Front" project mentioned by Poroshenko brought together scientists, journalists, and artists from different Ukrainian cities to popularize Ukrainian history "without censorship".

In December 2016, the Ministry of Information Policy announced the creation of a new field of study in Ukrainian higher education institutions – communication studies instead of journalism. This step was driven by the state's need for qualified communication specialists. Expanding the competencies of Ukrainian civilian and military specialists in strategic communications was recognized as one of the key vectors for developing Ukraine's state communication system and a primary goal of Ukraine's interaction with NATO.

=== Cooperation with NATO ===
In February 2016, the Verkhovna Rada of Ukraine ratified an agreement on the representation of NATO's Public Diplomacy Division on its territory. The NATO representation became an important coordinator in the field of strategic communication, along with individual countries that expressed interest in supporting these efforts.

In the autumn of 2016, at the annual NATO conference on information and communication issues, special attention was paid to Ukraine, focusing on its experience in countering Russian information influence. The Advisor to the Minister on Strategic Communications emphasized the need for practical participation of Western partners in implementing the developed project roadmap. She expressed expectations that 2017 would bring the first noticeable results in Ukraine's information policy.

In early 2017, a meeting was held in Brussels between the Minister of Information Policy and the NATO Deputy Secretary General for Public Diplomacy, as well as representatives of the United States, Lithuania, and the United Kingdom to NATO. At the meeting, Yuriy Stets presented the progress Ukraine had made in strategic communications and presented the action plan for 2017. Among the successful initiatives for 2016 were the successful launch of the UATV channel into the global space, the conduct of 6 communication campaigns on the reintegration of Crimea, the establishment of February 26 as the Day of Resistance to Russian Occupation, the development of a roadmap for the Information Reintegration Strategy for Donbas, the adoption of the resolution "Situation of human rights in the Autonomous Republic of Crimea and the city of Sevastopol (Ukraine)" by the United Nations General Assembly, and others.

On the day of the NATO meetings, the news agency "Ukrinform" held a press conference on the topic "Strategy for the preservation and sustainable development of the culture, traditions, national character, and identity of the Crimean Tatars." The First Deputy Minister of Information Policy proposed implementing similar practices in other ministries of the Ukrainian government by introducing the position of advisor on Crimean affairs. A two-year action plan was developed and presented for the Crimean Tatars, including various events such as sessions at the UN, photo exhibitions, and others. The goal of these events was to instill in the global consciousness the idea that the Crimean Tatars are the indigenous people of the Crimean Peninsula and of Ukraine, whose rights are being violated by Russia. The successful implementation of this plan предполагалось consolidation of Crimean Tatar identity through various cultural and information initiatives. The topic of Crimea was also reflected in Ukraine's information space through the film "Crimea. Resistance."

== Presidency of Volodymyr Zelenskyy (2019–present) ==
=== Narratives ===
In 2019, Ukrainian authorities actively worked on delivering narratives to the population of Crimea and Donbas. President Volodymyr Zelenskyy, who spent much of his acting career in Russia and Ukraine, used his Russian language skills and personal experience to gain the trust of local residents. After winning the presidential election, he promised to pay pensions to residents of the occupied regions and facilitate movement between Ukraine and the occupied territories.

=== Restrictions and bans ===
Since 2019, after Volodymyr Zelenskyy came to power, the President's Office managed to reach agreements with television channels owned by oligarchs Rinat Akhmetov and Viktor Pinchuk. As of 2020, these media outlets cautiously covered the president's activities due to an agreement between Zelenskyy and a group of channels influenced by Viktor Medvedchuk.

Among the laws of Ukrainian propaganda aimed at "supporting the defense of the state and nation" is a decree signed by Volodymyr Zelenskyy in May 2020, which restricts Russian social networks and online services such as "Mail.ru", "VKontakte", and "Odnoklassniki". Another is a law from January 2022 that prohibits Ukrainian print media from publishing exclusively in the Russian language (this followed the April 2019 law "On Ensuring the Functioning of the Ukrainian Language as the State Language", which established Ukrainian as mandatory for use in all spheres, including culture, medicine, and the service industry).

In February 2021, under Volodymyr Zelenskyy's leadership, three pro-Russian Ukrainian TV channels – ZIK, NewsOne, and 112 Ukraine – linked to oligarch Viktor Medvedchuk, were shut down. This decision provoked a sharp reaction from the Kremlin, and European leaders criticized Zelenskyy for encroaching on freedom of speech. In response to this criticism, the Ukrainian president stated that these channels had indirectly "killed many people." This decision by the Ukrainian government became a subject of debate in the context of freedom of speech. According to former CIA and U.S. State Department analyst Paul Goble, Ukraine should actively expose Russian fakes, disseminate this information in the West, and explain to citizens how Russian propaganda affects them. He emphasizes the need for an active offensive by Ukrainian propaganda targeting Russian citizens and Ukrainian communities in territories controlled by Russia. In Goble's view, Ukrainian narratives have been insufficiently persuasive.

In 2021, under Volodymyr Zelenskyy's leadership, the Center for Countering Disinformation was established under the National Security and Defense Council of Ukraine. Its stated goals were to detect and counter "propaganda" and "destructive disinformation," as well as to prevent "manipulation of public opinion." A Center for Strategic Communications and Information Security was also created under the Ministry of Culture and Information Policy, focused on cooperation with civil and international society, including organizations such as StopFake, VoxCheck, the Institute for Regional Press Development, the Ukraine Crisis Media Center, the Open Information Partnership, Internews-Ukraine, the Atlantic Council's DFRLab, and the Delegation of the European Union to Ukraine. Unlike the Center for Countering Disinformation, the Center for Strategic Communications and Information Security is more focused on developing alternative narratives and studying and promoting the history of Ukraine.

== Ukrainian textbooks ==
Ukrainian history textbooks contain a number of controversial aspects that are the subject of debate among scholars, educators, and politicians. One of the key areas of discussion concerns episodes from the history of Ukraine, such as the Holodomor, the activities of the Ukrainian Insurgent Army, and historical relations between Ukraine and Russia. Debates surrounding history textbooks in Ukraine often represent a confrontation between adherents of the Soviet historical school and proponents of the idea of history as the people's struggle for independence from various occupiers, primarily Russia, Poland, Hungary, and Germany. Issues such as the Russification of Ukraine, changes in the portrayal of the 2004 Orange Revolution, the activities of Hetman Ivan Mazepa, and Ukrainian-Russian armed clashes in 1918 also provoke certain controversies and discussions.

Until 2010, textbooks devoted significant attention to the Holodomor. With the coming to power of Viktor Yanukovych in 2010, the concept changed, presenting the Holodomor as a common tragedy for the peoples of the USSR, rather than as a separate act of genocide against the Ukrainian people.

Another topic of debate is the activities of the Ukrainian Insurgent Army in the 1940s and 1950s. Until 2010, textbooks emphasized the UPA's resistance to German troops. As of 2013, the bravery of Soviet partisans in fighting the Germans is also highlighted. Shifts in emphasis are also noticeable in the designation of events as World War II and the Great Patriotic War. Some scholars prefer to avoid the term "Great Patriotic War" or use it to denote the period of Ukraine's occupation by Nazi troops. For the majority of the country, the war began in September 1939.

== Question of propaganda's existence and its criticism ==
In 2016, the editor-in-chief of the Ukrainian fact-checking resource StopFake, Yevhen Fedchenko, noted that there was no targeted system of Ukrainian propaganda run by the government in the country, and the reason for this was not only a lack of state resources and competence but also that it would be difficult to control Ukrainian media due to its diversity. Denys Popovych from the Ukrainian online publication "Apostrophe" believed that propaganda in Ukraine was not being conducted properly.

The editor-in-chief of the Ukrainian website Censor.net, Yuriy Butusov, notes that Ukraine has a sufficient number of structures responsible for information policy and its coordination; however, in his opinion, none of these structures function in an integrated manner. During military operations, Butusov notes, such decentralization and lack of coordination in the sphere of information policy make it impossible to exert significant influence on the enemy and to influence populations that have previously been subjected to "information weapons."

In a column for The New York Times, journalist Ian Bateson, criticizing the Ukrainian website Myrotvorets, noted that Ukraine had long believed it was dominating Russian propaganda. Due to limited budget resources, Bateson argues, the Ukrainian side is unable to conduct large-scale propaganda campaigns; however, some Ukrainian media and journalists avoid covering topics that might look unfavorable for Ukraine or be beneficial to Russian propaganda. Representatives of the Ukrainian authorities consider this approach an effective political tool and make efforts to explain any criticism of Ukraine as a result of the Russian "hybrid war."

In 2019, Professor Piotr Dela from the Polish Academy of Military Art noted that Ukraine's actions in the information war during the war in Donbas were inconsistent and ineffective – they manifested in organizational and informational chaos following the change of power, conflicts of interest among Ukrainian oligarchs, corruption, and a lack of systemic solutions to improve the economy. As an example of the ineffectiveness of Ukrainian actions, he cited the information failure in the international presentation of the downed Boeing 777. The scholar believes Ukraine lost the information war due to its inability to effectively respond to the enormous threat. The authorities used administrative methods, such as expelling Russian journalists and revoking the accreditation of a number of Russian media outlets, restricting the broadcast of Russian television and radio, banning Russian films, and prohibiting Russian actors and musicians from entering the country.

Dela wrote that in Ukraine, as in Western countries, there is a lack of cooperation and coordination in information policy. He cites problems such as a shortage of state funding for projects and initiatives, and insufficient support and training for journalists and experts engaged in anti-Russian propaganda.

In June 2022, Ukrainian political scientist Mykhailo Chaplyha noted that Ukrainian propaganda does not exist in the sense that the state has no concept of a "Ukrainian world" analogous to the concept of the "Russian world."

== Academic research ==
In the context of implementing state humanitarian policy within the Armed Forces of Ukraine for humanitarian and social support, a scientific research project titled "Organization of Information and Propaganda Support for the Daily Activities of the Armed Forces" was conducted at the National Defence University of Ukraine in 2005. This work provided a historical analysis of the formation and development of information work in the army, identified the main trends in the development of information and propaganda support for the daily activities of the armed forces, including foreign experience, revealed methodological and applied aspects of modern information-psychological influence technologies, studied the current state of information and propaganda support in the Armed Forces of Ukraine, and substantiated practical recommendations for its improvement. The main results of the research formed the basis of a textbook for training communication specialists.

The issue of the organization, main forms and methods of information and propaganda support, and their place in the overall system of educational work in the Armed Forces of Ukraine, is covered in the textbook "Educational Work in the Armed Forces of Ukraine" (2010).

In the collective authorship study "Moral and Psychological Support in the Armed Forces of Ukraine" (2012), the essence, purpose, and tasks of information and propaganda support were scientifically substantiated.

A 2017 scientific work, authored by specialists from the National Defence University of Ukraine, examines the scientific and practical foundations of communicative processes in the Armed Forces of Ukraine, as well as the main theories and concepts of mass communication and propaganda. The elucidation of the nature and features of communicative processes in the army was undertaken, among other things, considering the transition to NATO standards and changes in information organization and pricing.

== See also ==
- Freedom of speech in Ukraine
- Mass media in Ukraine
- Censorship in Ukraine
- Internet censorship in Ukraine
- Public diplomacy of Ukraine

== Notes ==
- Dela, Piotr (2019). "Propaganda in Ukrainian Conflict. Case Study". Kwartalnik "Bellona". 698 (3): 108–118. doi:10.5604/01.3001.0013.7450.

== Bibliography ==
- Bilotserkivskyi, V. Ya. (2007). Історія України (PDF) (in Ukrainian). K.: Tsentr uchbovoi literatury. p. 536. ISBN 978-966-364-427-1.
- Nahorna, O. S. (2006). "Пропаганда сепаратизма среди восточно-европейских народностей Российской империи в германских лагерях военнопленных первой мировой войны". Problemy Istorii, Filologii, Kultury (16–3): 134–136. ISSN 1992-0431.
- Topalova, Viktoriya (January 2006). "In Search of Heroes: Cultural Politics and Political Mobilization of Youths in Contemporary Russia and Ukraine" (PDF). Demokratizatsiya the Journal of Post-Soviet Democratization. 14 (1): 23–41. doi:10.3200/DEMO.14.1.23-41 (inactive 24 February 2026).
- Slukhai, Nataliia (30 May 2016). "The Semiotics of Consciental War in Modern Ukraine". Ante Portas – Studia nad Bezpieczeństwem. 1 (6). Wyższa Szkoła Biznesu i Przedsiębiorczości w Ostrowcu Świętokrzyskim: 161–164.
- Tsvetkova, N. A.; Sytnyk, A. N. (2017). "Информационные технологии в реалиях политического кризиса: от сетевого проекта «Евромайдан» до создания стратегической коммуникации на Украине (2013–2016 гг.)". Vlast (4): 86–91. ISSN 2071-5358.
- Mykhailichenko, A. (10 April 2017). "Контрпропаганда в українських ЗМІ, реалії сьогодення" (PDF). Science and Education a New Dimension. Humanities and Social Sciences (in Ukrainian). 21 (130): 59–64.
- Zhdanova, Mariia; Orlova, Dariya (2017). Samuel Woolley, Philip N. Howard (ed.). "Computational Propaganda in Ukraine: Caught Between External Threats and Internal Challenges". Project on Computational Propaganda. Oxford: 1–26.
- Fedotov, M. V. (2018). "Пропаганда в конфликте на востоке Украины через призму её анализа Гарольдом Лассуэллом". Idei I Novatsii. 6 (4): 31–36.
- Pydoprihora, Ihor (2018). "Contemporary Historiography of Information and Propaganda In the Navy of Ukraine". Skhidnoievropeiskyi Istorychnyi Visnyk (in Ukrainian). 8. doi:10.24919/2519-058x.8.143429 (inactive 24 February 2026).
- Negro, Matteo (2022). "Analysis and effects of war propaganda during the Russo-Ukrainian conflict: evidences from the field". Luiss Guido Carli University: 1–106.
- Petre, Silviu (2022). "Propaganda and Postheroism in Russia's Invasion of Ukraine. A Meditation Around Conflict as an Imagined Community". Analele Universității din Oradea Seria Relații Internaționale și Studii Europene. 14. Editura Universitatii din Oradea: 79–100. doi:10.58603/JDGN5273.
- Uyes Sefa Ersan Kaya; Uyes Merve Ekiz Kaya (31 August 2022). "The Usage of Posters for the Purpose of Propaganda as Instruments of Visual Communication: Examples of Ukrainian Posters" (PDF). International Journal of Communication and Art: 20–57.
- Mahda, Yevhen (2022). "The Main War of The Century: Preliminary Results". Sõjateadlane (20): 68–101.
- Juutilainen, Jari (2022). "Cyber Warfare: A Part of the Russo-Ukrainian War in 2022" (PDF). JAMK University of Applied Sciences.
- Luis Alonso-Martín-Romo; Miguel Oliveros-Mediavilla; Enrique Vaquerizo Domínguez (2023). "Perception and opinion of the Ukrainian population regarding information manipulation: A study on disinformation in the Ukrainian war". Profesional de la información. 32. doi:10.3145/epi.2023.jul.05 (inactive 24 February 2026).
- Hasan, Mahedi (2024). "Russia–Ukraine Propaganda on Social Media: A Bibliometric Analysis". Journalism and Media. 5 (3): 980–992. doi:10.3390/journalmedia5030062.
- Saravyn, Hanna (2023). Warfare & Social Media: Disinformation and Propaganda in the Digital Age (PDF) (Thesis). Vienna: Central European University. pp. 1–48.
- Anton Oleinik; Volodymyr Panlotto (2023). "War Propaganda Unfolded: Comparative Effectiveness of Propaganda and Counterpropaganda in Russia's Invasion of Ukraine". International Journal of Communication. 17: 7265–7290.
- Mujib, Syahrir; Reksoprodjo, A. H. S.; Dohamid, A. G.; Yacobus, David (April 2023). "The Social Media Dominance: Ukraine's Key Strategy in the Information War Against the Russian Invasion". International Journal of Humanities Education and Social Sciences. 2 (5): 6. doi:10.55227/ijhess.v2i5.396.
- Gardner, Melanie (25 May 2023). "Slava Propahandi (Glory to Propaganda): A Content Analysis of Propaganda in the 2022 Russian Invasion of Ukraine". Doctoral Dissertations and Projects: 25.
- Kravchenko, Nataliia; Prokopchuk, Mariia; Bondarenko, Elvira; Korniiko, Iryna; Moyseyenko, Iryna (5 June 2023). "An ideational level of Ukrainian counterpropaganda: the communicative-discursive dimension". Amazonia Investiga. 12 (5): 38–47. doi:10.34069/AI/2023.66.06.4.
- Kutidze, Davit (5 October 2023). "Ukraine's Strategic Communication Against the Russian Disinformation" (PDF). Gnomon Wise. Research Institute Gnomon Wise: 1–16.
- Hotsur, Oksana; Danylina, Olena; Zozulia, Nataliia; Stiekolshchykova, Valentyna; Porpulit, Olena; Danko-Sliptsova, Anna (6 October 2023). "How does Information Manipulation Interfere with Normal Brain Function? The Disruption of Neuroethics in War-Time Mass Media". Broad Research in Artificial Intelligence and Neuroscience. 14 (3): 224–240. doi:10.18662/brain/14.3/472.
