= Information war during the Russo-Ukrainian war =

Information war during the Russo-Ukrainian war may refer to:

- Russian information war against Ukraine
  - Disinformation in the Russian invasion of Ukraine
- Ukrainian information war during Russian invasion of Ukraine
