= Be Brave Like Ukraine =

Communication campaign

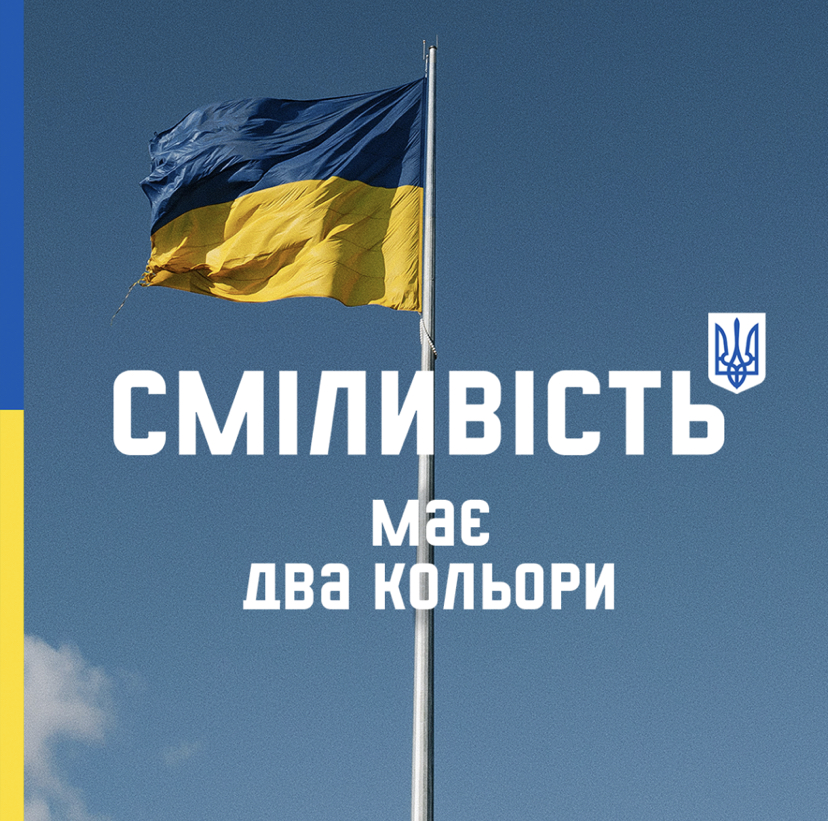
- Produced by: Banda Agency
- Country: Ukraine
- Website: https://brave.ua

Be Brave Like Ukraine (Ukrainian: Будь сміливим, як Україна) or Bravery (Ukrainian: Сміливість) is a communication campaign created during the full-scale Russian invasion of Ukraine in 2022. The campaign which is claimed to be part of Ukrainian propaganda is designed to highlight the main feature of Ukrainians. It was developed by the creative agency Banda Agency together with the Office of the President of Ukraine, the Cabinet of Ministers of Ukraine, the Ministry of Culture and Information Policy and the Ministry of Digital Transformation. The campaign uses the typeface KTF Jermilov, a modular display font following the typographical practice of Kharkiv avant-garde artist and designer Vasyl Yermylov.

== History ==
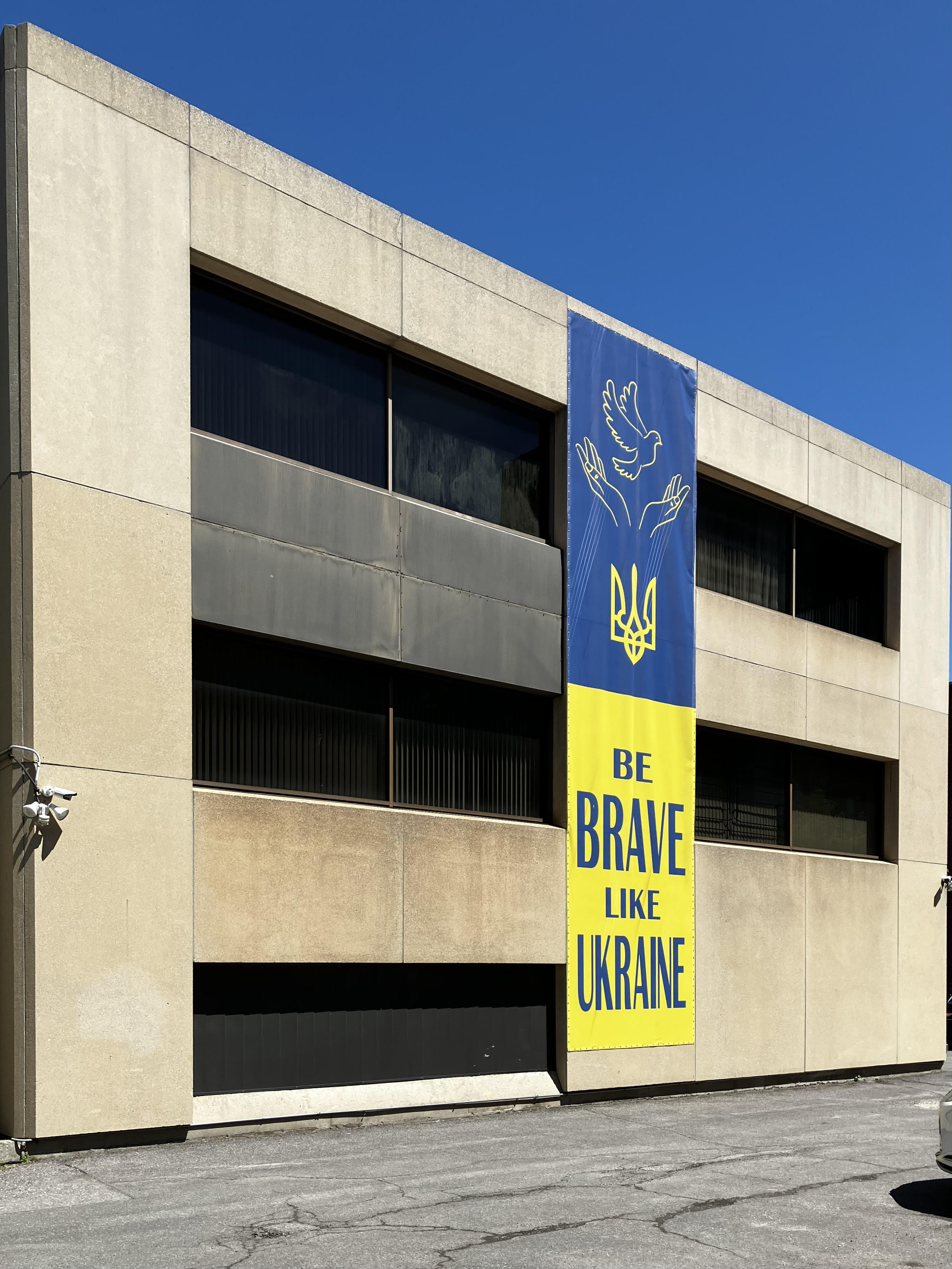
The campaign banner hung outside of the Embassy of Ukraine, Ottawa.

The campaign began on April 8, 2022. The first post on the Brave.ua Instagram page is a joint one with the President of Ukraine.

Volodymyr Zelenskyy called on Ukrainians to take part in the #BRAVEUKRAINE flashmob and present photos and videos that show the courage of the people.

The main mission of the project is to capture and spread the association that courage is a brand of Ukraine. The goal of the international campaign is to share courage with the world and create an image of a country where brave people, bold businesses and bold ideas live

The President of Ukraine Volodymyr Zelenskyy believes that Ukrainians have always been the bravest in the world. According to him, this is the brand of our people.

In fact, this is our brand. This is what it means to be us. To be Ukrainians. To be brave. If everyone in the world had at least ten percent of the courage that we Ukrainians have, there would be no danger to international law at all. There would be no danger to the freedom of the nations. We will spread our courage. We will start a special global campaign. We will teach the world to be not just a little bit, but full of courage. Like us, like Ukrainians.

— Volodymyr Zelenskyy

Dozens of Ukrainian brands and companies joined the project. Meanwhile, billboards Be brave Like Ukraine can already be seen on the streets of Canada, Poland, Germany, Italy, Austria, the United Kingdom, Spain, the United States and other countries. The billboards and signs with the words Be Brave Like Ukraine were placed in the most crowded places - in the central squares, near metro stations and at public transport stops. For example, in the United States, Ukrainian advertising appeared in Times Square in New York.

== See also ==
- Ukraine NOW
- United24
- Embrace Ukraine. Strengthen the Union
- Come Back Alive
- People's Bayraktar
- Saint Javellin
