= Madonna of Kyiv =

Photograph and painting

Photo of Tetyana Blizniak by András Földes

Madonna of Kyiv (Ukrainian: Київська Мадонна, romanized: Kyivska Madonna) is a photo of a woman nursing a child while taking refuge in the Kyiv Metro, taken in February 2022 in the first days of the Russian invasion of Ukraine. Taken by a Hungarian journalist András Földes, the photo has become popular on the Internet. It has become an illustration of both a humanitarian crisis and an unjust war.

Ukrainian artist Marina Solomenikova drew a portrait based on the photo, which became the inspiration for an icon displayed in a Catholic church in Mugnano di Napoli, Italy, becoming an artistic symbol of resistance and hope.

== History ==
On February 25, 2022, the day after Russia launched a full-scale invasion of Ukraine, 27-year-old Tetyana Blizniak was taking refuge in the tunnels of the Kyiv subway with her husband and three-month-old daughter Marichka. Although Blizniak and her family were supposed to be evacuated on February 26, they could not get out of the tunnel they were sheltering in because of the fighting. When Blizniak breastfed her daughter, it caught the attention of Hungarian journalist András Földes, and he spontaneously filmed it. The photo went viral and was even shared by the Vatican's official website.

Madonna of Kyiv
- Canvas copy of Madonna of Kyiv on display at the a church in Naples
- Artist: Marina Solomenikova
- Year: 2022
- Location: Mugnano di Napoli

Ukrainian artist Marina Solomennykova from Dnipro was among those who saw it. She used the iconic image of a woman as inspiration for his portrait of Mary nursing her baby. In the picture, a Ukrainian woman's headdress is used as a veil of Mary, and her head is depicted in front of a subway map. On March 5, 2020, the artist posted the portrait on the Internet.

At the request of the Jesuit priest Vyacheslav Okun, a canvas copy of the portrait "Madonna from the Metro" was sent to Italy to be kept in the place where the priest will serve. On Holy Thursday, the Archbishop of Naples consecrated the painting as an object of worship. The icon was displayed in the Church of the Sacred Heart of Jesus, nicknamed "Madonna of Kyiv", located in the commune of Mugnano di Napoli. The icon was consecrated by Pope Francis on March 25, 2022.

Tetyana Blizniak later took refuge in Lviv.

== Significance ==
The image has become both an illustration of humanitarian crisis and unjust war, and a symbol of hope and silent resistance of Ukrainians. The portrait, in turn, as the mother of Jesus of Nazareth, who took refuge from the danger of Herod the Great is today considered a symbol of the modern Mary who takes refuge from the violence of war and nurses her baby like him. The Kyiv Virgin is also notable for its role in Ukrainian history and national identity. During the Soviet era, the icon was used as a symbol of Ukrainian nationalism and resistance to Soviet domination. Today, it is considered a cultural treasure and a symbol of Ukrainian identity and heritage.

== See also ==
- Saint Javelin
