= Ukraine NOW =

Ukrainian international promotion campaign

Ukraine NOW is an official brand of Ukraine, developed by the creative company Banda Agency and approved by the Ukrainian Government on May 10, 2018. The main goal was to form a positive image of Ukraine among the international community, attract foreign investors and improve tourism potential.

== Description ==
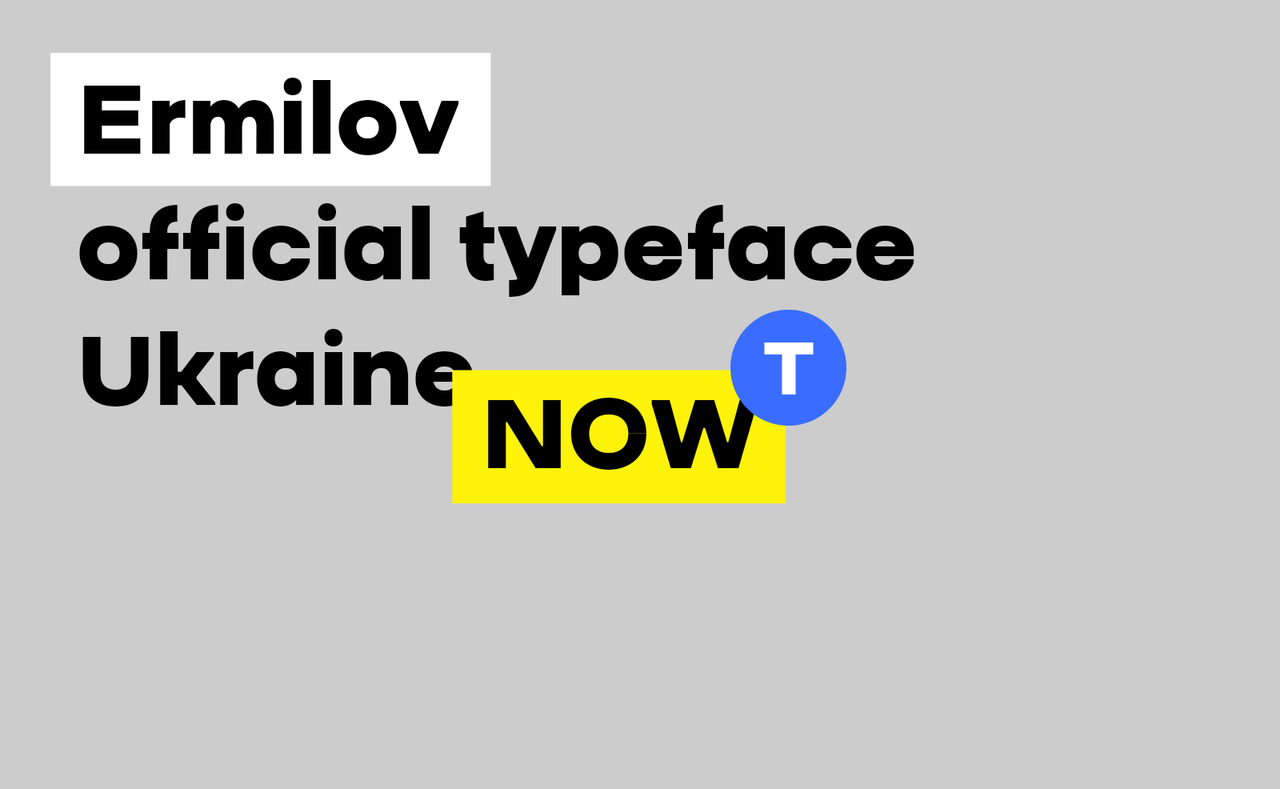
Typeface Ermilov bold

The main logo of the brand is a combination of the country's name, communication message NOW and the corresponding icon. The main icon is the national top-level domain of Ukraine - UA.

The logo is transformable. Elements can be freely changed due to the format of the usage. The icon serves as a kind of "thematic rubricator"; it is possible to develop your own icon design.

The main typeface of the brand is the Yermylov Bold typeface, which was created specifically for the Ukraine NOW brand. Its author was inspired by the works of Ukrainian constructivist artist Vasyl Yermylov.

Company brand-name colours are yellow, blue and black.

== History ==
Branding of countries, regions and cities spread at the beginning of the 21st century. In particular, the new brand was introduced in Singapore and South Korea in 2007, and in Hong Kong in 2000, but it was revised in 2004 and 2007. Also in the early 2000s, their brands were introduced in the UK and Eastern Europe. Full-fledged programs to promote the brands of countries cost billions of dollars. Basically, they are aimed at foreign audiences to attract foreign tourists, students, investors.

In 2017, the Ministry of Information Policy of Ukraine initiated the creation of the Concept of popularization of Ukraine in the world, which insisted on the creation of a single brand to promote Ukraine. An expert committee was set up for this purpose, which included both civil servants and well-known public figures and experts. Both the writing of the Concept and all the processes of creating a single brand were initiated and accompanied by the State Secretary of the Ministry of Information Policy Artem Bidenko. The expert committee launched the competition on the best version of the logo.

In the course of the committee's work and with the support of the British government, a study was conducted on how Ukraine is perceived abroad. It included 6 focus groups from Great Britain, Germany and Poland, showing several concepts of Ukraine promotion. This process was joined by Conrad Bird, who led the famous campaign to promote the UK called GREAT. It was found out that the three most popular associations with Ukraine are "corruption", "revolution" and "war". People who have never been to Ukraine see Ukrainians as closed, aggressive and intolerant. With such a reputation, it is difficult to attract investment and tourists to the country, change perceptions of Ukrainians and persuade people to come here, so Ukraine needs a brand.

Ukrainian experts and creatives worked on the development of the final version of the brand. The participants of the competition, having received the results of the research, had to offer their ideas for finalizing the recommendations from the British.

The work lasted for nine months, and before the final decision, the brand options were tested again in the target audiences with the assistance of the UkraineInvest.

Finally, the committee of the Ministry of Information Policy chose an option of the Ukraine Now brand, created by the Ukrainian agency Banda Agency, which previously created the logo of Ukraine for Eurovision-2017. No budget funds were spent on its creation.

The brand was approved at the meeting of the Groysman Government on May 10, 2018.

It is open for use and processing.

On September 26, the Cabinet of Ministers approved the Ukraine Now brand book, that is, technical standards for the use of the brand. The brand book was commissioned by the Ministry of Information Policy by the Export Promotion Office with the support of the European Bank for Reconstruction and Development.

== Usage ==
The brand is designed for both online and offline use; both state and municipal institutions, as well as businesses and individuals.

It is used, in particular, on printed materials, souvenirs, radio, television, outdoor advertising, but also in transport, social networks etc. The use of a logo with state symbols is allowed.

Based on the Ukraine NOW logo, web productions Vintage and SOLAR Digital have created image generators. KLEI company together with Banda developed stickers with the inscription Ukraine NOW, "so that everyone could stick their Ukraine NOW and tell the whole world". To mark the anniversary of the introduction of the visa-free regime, Indium Lab studio has developed an augmented reality application that designs the brand logo on a biometric passport. Other examples of the brand's life are given in the articles of The Village Ukraine and UP: Life.

The Ukraine Now visual brand is used in the Ukraine.ua site design, used by the Ministry of Foreign Affairs as a platform to promote Ukraine for foreigners.

== Reaction and criticism ==
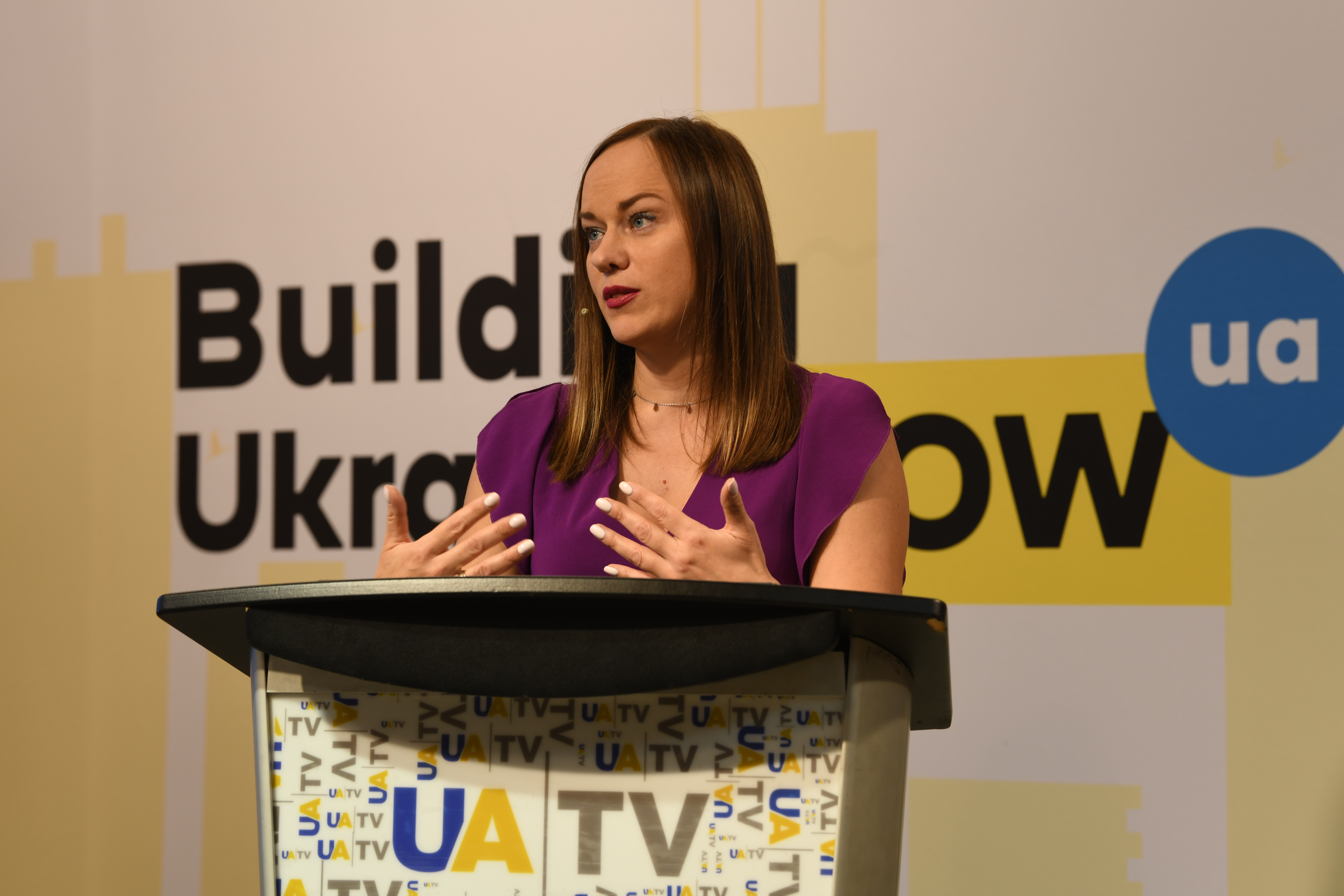
Presenter in the press-room with the logo in the background

The logo was widely discussed on social networks. Some called it too vague and simple. Because, in place of "Ukraine" one can add any country and will not notice the difference. Others noted a simple and modern style "without spikelets, sunflowers, churches and embroideries." The advantage was called the universality of the idea in different contexts.

The brand and logo received mixed reviews, mainly due to the similarity of the Ukraine NOW logo with the supersimple LinkedIn, YouTube or PornHub website logos.

Well-known artist Serhii Poiarkov negatively assessed the work of Banda Agency, and Russian designer Artemy Lebedev noted the "modern graphics" of the sign.

== Awards ==
Ukraine NOW branding from the Banda Agency received the prestigious Red Dot Design Award. The team won among 8,500 works from 45 countries.

Ukraine NOW won the nomination "Rebranding of the Year: change or go home" at the X-Ray Marketing Awards 2018. The brand also took second place in the nomination "Communications Revolution".

In 2019, Ukraine NOW received two Effie awards in the Ukrainian advertising competition "Awards Ukraine 2019".

== See also ==
- Public diplomacy of Ukraine
- Travel brand of Ukraine
- Be Brave Like Ukraine
- People's Bayraktar
