= Temnik =

Temnik Темник
- Settlement
- Location within Republic of Buryatia Location within Russia
- Coordinates: 51°00′N 106°11′E
- Country: Russia
- Region: Republic of Buryatia
- District: Selenginsky District
- Time zone: UTC+8:00

Temnik (Russian: Темник) is a rural locality (a settlement) in Selenginsky District, Republic of Buryatia, Russia. The population was 610 as of 2010. There are 10 streets.

== Geography ==
Temnik is located 52 km southwest of Gusinoozyorsk (the district's administrative centre) by road. 5818-y km is the nearest rural locality.
