= Public diplomacy of Ukraine =

Instrument of Ukraine's foreign policy

Ukrainian Flag

Ukraine's public diplomacy is an instrument of Ukraine's foreign policy aimed at promoting an attractive image of the state abroad through communication at the level of the public of other states. It includes the use of cultural diplomacy, social media, cooperation with non-governmental organizations and the Ukrainian diaspora, the creation and promotion of a state brand, and more. The impetus for the intensification of Ukrainian public diplomacy was the counteraction to Russia's armed aggression against Ukraine and the information war, Ukraine's search for foreign support, and the process of Ukraine's European and Euro-Atlantic integration.

== Subjects of public diplomacy of Ukraine ==
The main institution for the development and implementation of public diplomacy in Ukraine is the Department of Public Diplomacy under the Ministry of Foreign Affairs of Ukraine, which was established in 2015. The main tasks of the office are as follows:

- the development of public relations, public associations, and media between other countries and Ukraine.
- the implementation of image, cultural and information projects of Ukraine abroad.
- the coordination of measures of other executive bodies in these areas.

The Department of Public Diplomacy consists of the following departments: the Department of Cultural Diplomacy, the Department of Image Projects, and the Department of Media Relations. The department has its official Facebook page.

An important role in promoting the cultural component of the public diplomacy of Ukraine is played by the Ukrainian Institute together with the special institutions of the Ministry of Culture of Ukraine: the Ukrainian Cultural Foundation and the Ukrainian Book Institute, which promote Ukrainian culture and its integration into the world cultural space. A successful example of the use of cultural diplomacy is the Austria-Ukraine Culture Year 2019, in which a number of events were organized and held in both countries in many areas of culture and art.

Since 2006, 31 cultural and information centers have been operating at foreign diplomatic missions of Ukraine, disseminating information about Ukraine in the host country.

Ukrainian expatriates (communities of the Ukrainian diaspora and activists of the new wave of volunteer support for the events related to the Revolution of Dignity and military actions in eastern Ukraine) are a powerful provider of Ukrainian cultural promotion. In 2013–2015, the “last wave” of the Ukrainian diaspora abroad founded about 50 volunteer movements.

The Ukrainian Diaspora has also established the Global Ukraine Network, which aims to bring together the creative, intellectual, and financial resources of Ukrainians around the world to support the effort of creating an extraterritorial Ukrainian space where leading Ukrainian organizations, independent leaders, and experts can promote the interests of Ukraine.

== Thematic documents ==
The concept of the popularization of Ukraine in the world and the promotion of Ukraine's interests in the world information space.

(Approved by the order of the Cabinet of Ministers of Ukraine on October 11, 2016, No. 739-r)

Purpose of the Concept:

- Popularization of Ukraine in world information resources and national information resources of foreign states, aimed at protecting its political, economic and socio-cultural interests, strengthening its national security, and restoring territorial integrity.
- Formation of a positive image of Ukraine by highlighting objective information about competitive advantages, strengths, significant achievements of our country on the world stage, and broad prospects for the cooperation of the international community with Ukraine.
- Provision at the interdepartmental level of constant operational and coordinated activities for the preparation and dissemination in the world information space of truthful and objective information about Ukraine, in particular its individual regions, as well as increasing the tourist and investment attractiveness of Ukraine.

The doctrine of Ukraine's information security

(Approved by the Decree of the President of Ukraine on February 25, 2017, No. 47/2017)

The purpose of the Doctrine is to clarify the principles of formation and implementation of state information policy, primarily to counter the destructive information influence of the Russian Federation in the context of its hybrid war. The Doctrine, in particular, states such principles as:

- Formation of a positive image of Ukraine in the world, communication of operative, reliable and objective information about events in Ukraine to the international community.
- Development of the foreign broadcasting system of Ukraine, ensuring the presence of a foreign-language Ukrainian channel in cable networks, and in satellite broadcasting outside Ukraine.

Ukraine 2020 Sustainable Development Strategy

(Approved by the Decree of the President of Ukraine on January 12, 2015, No. 5/2015)

The strategy, in particular, states the need to create and implement a program to promote Ukraine around the world and promote the interests of Ukraine in the global information space, specified as one of the top priorities, and the program to create a brand "Ukraine."

== Brand of Ukraine ==
Ukraine Now logo

In 2010, CFC Consulting developed the first comprehensive national branding strategy "Ukraine" for the Ministry of Foreign Affairs of Ukraine. Within its framework, the slogan of positioning Ukraine abroad was created - "Ukraine, moving in the fast lane!"

Ukraine NOW is the official brand of Ukraine in accordance with the order of the Cabinet of Ministers of Ukraine dated May 10, 2018. The concept with the logo was developed by the creative agency "Banda Agency" to establish the brand of Ukraine around the world, attract investment to the country, and improve tourism potential. Ukraine NOW is an open brand that can be used by anyone. The logo is actively used by government agencies and Ukrainian companies.

Reviews of this brand are mostly positive, as evidenced by the victory of Banda in the design competition Red Dot Award 2018 for branding Ukraine in the category of Corporate Identity.

== See also ==
- Ministry of Foreign Affairs (Ukraine)
- Ukrainian Institute
- Ukraine NOW
- Ukrainian Cultural Foundation
- Ukrainian diaspora
- Public diplomacy
