= Saint Javelin =

Russo-Ukrainian War meme

- An illustration depicting Saint Javelin
- First appearance: 2022
- Created by: Christian Borys
- Based on: ''Madonna Kalashnikov'' by Chris Shaw
- Designed by: Evgeniy Shalashov

In-universe information
- Gender: Female
- Title: Saint
- Weapon: FGM-148 Javelin
- Religion: Eastern Orthodoxy
- Nationality: Ukrainian

Saint Javelin is an Internet meme and fictional character depicted in a religious icon style as a saint-like figure cradling a modern weapon used against the Russian invasion of Ukraine, such as the FGM-148 Javelin anti-tank weapon. The meme was created by Christian Borys during the 2022 Russian invasion of Ukraine and became famous around the world, eventually resulting in other similar memes. The meme boosted morale and was used in merchandise products, resulting in more than a million dollars raised for humanitarian charities assisting Ukraine.

== Background ==
The meme was created by Ukrainian-Canadian journalist Christian Borys, initially for use on stickers whose proceeds were to be donated to humanitarian efforts in Ukraine. The Saint Javelin meme went viral online as a symbol of resistance against the Russian invasion of Ukraine.

Christian Borys is based in Toronto but was previously working in Ukraine as a journalist during the initial conflict in 2014. While there, he freelanced for various countries and was particularly moved by the plight of orphans and widows from the war in Donbas.

== Meme ==
The meme itself depicts a stylised Madonna (mistakenly claimed to be Mary Magdalene or based on Saint Olga of Kyiv by some sources), cradling a Missile launcher. The Virgin Mary, as depicted in the promotional campaign, is represented in a traditional Orthodox icon style. Whilst in the standard artistic Madonna, Mary would be often depicted cradling the baby Jesus in her arms, in this case, she is cradling an anti-tank weapon instead. The humour of the meme is in the juxtaposition of Mary, Mother of Jesus, and a modern anti-tank weapon.

The weapon depicted is a US-made FGM-148 Javelin anti-tank weapon that has been donated in large numbers and is seeing active use in Ukraine against Russian armour. The Madonna and other traditional figures have been depicted holding incongruous modern items that contrast with the traditional representation of religious figures, from sneakers, to gold plated AK-47s.

Rather than traditionally-coloured robes, hers are usually either dark green to resemble combat uniforms, or blue and yellow. While her halo was red in an earlier version, it was later changed to blue and yellow, the national colours of Ukraine. The meme has reached mainstream popularity, to the point where it has become a genuinely recognised symbol of Ukrainian resistance.

The design was created by Ukrainian graphic designer Evgeniy Shalashov, who is based in Lviv and was employed by Borys. It is an adaptation of "Madonna Kalashnikov", a 2012 painting by US artist Chris Shaw. Shaw himself was surprised to "find an image of 'Saint Javelin' going viral all over the internet as a meme," and noted that even though the alteration was done without his permission, it is used for charity so the results are positive.

== Criticism ==
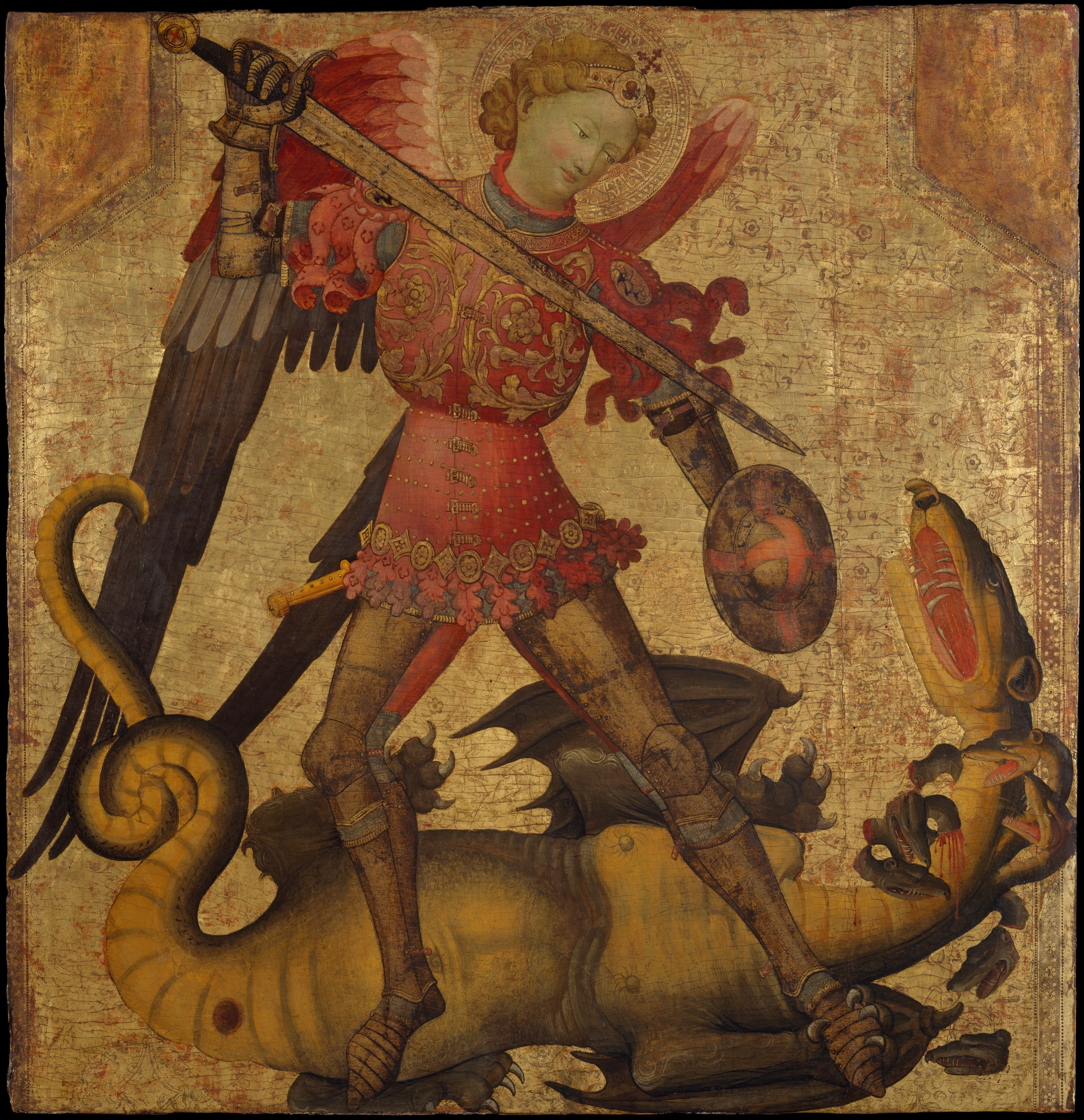
Saint Michael depicted with a sword

The Council of Churches condemned the use of a Madonna-like saint figure with modern weapons of war as blasphemy. This criticism actualized when a mural depicting Saint Javelin that had been painted on the side of a residential building in Kyiv later had the blue halo with its two yellow stylized trident or tryzub painted out, leaving the saint-like figure holding a javelin anti-tank weapon. The muralists, known as Kailas-V, accused mayor of Kyiv Vitali Klitschko of ordering the painting over of the mural's halo.

Religious icons are often depicted with weapons, such as in the image of Saint Michael where he is depicted with a sword. Christian Borys has offered the counterpoint to criticism of Saint Javelin that the Saint Javelin meme both means a lot to people in Ukraine as a symbol during the Russian invasion of Ukraine and that there is a long history of using religious icons as a source of moral support during a war.

== Campaign ==
Christian Borys had previously worked with a Ukrainian charity called Help Us Help and donated initial proceeds from Saint Javelin stickers sold online to help children and orphans affected by the war. As of March 2022, Borys has stated that he plans for the 'Saint Javelin' brand to become a full-time effort and he hoped to hire permanent staff so it can continue to support reconstruction efforts after the current war ends. To help rebuild Ukraine directly Borys has made an effort to have more of the items sold by Saint Javelin made in Ukraine in order to provide jobs to people in Ukraine and raise funds from profits to help rebuild Ukraine.

With the growing popularity of the Saint Javelin and desire to help rebuild Ukraine, Christian Borys expanded the offerings beyond stickers and added other 'saints' to the Saint Javelin brand to provide more funding to other humanitarian efforts helping Ukrainians impacted by the Russian invasion of Ukraine.

The 'saints' of the Saint Javelin brand include:

- Saint Javelin
- Saint HIMARS
- M777 Moses
- Saint Patron
- Saint NLAW
- Saint Olga
- Saint Neptune
- Saint Carl Gustaf
- Sankt Panzerfaust
- Taras Shevchenko
- Saint Stinger
- Saint Dana
- Saint Piorun
- Saint Zuzana
- Our Lady of Mariupol

The desire of regular people to help Ukrainians impacted by the war helped fuel the Saint Javelin campaign, which has already raised over $1 million.

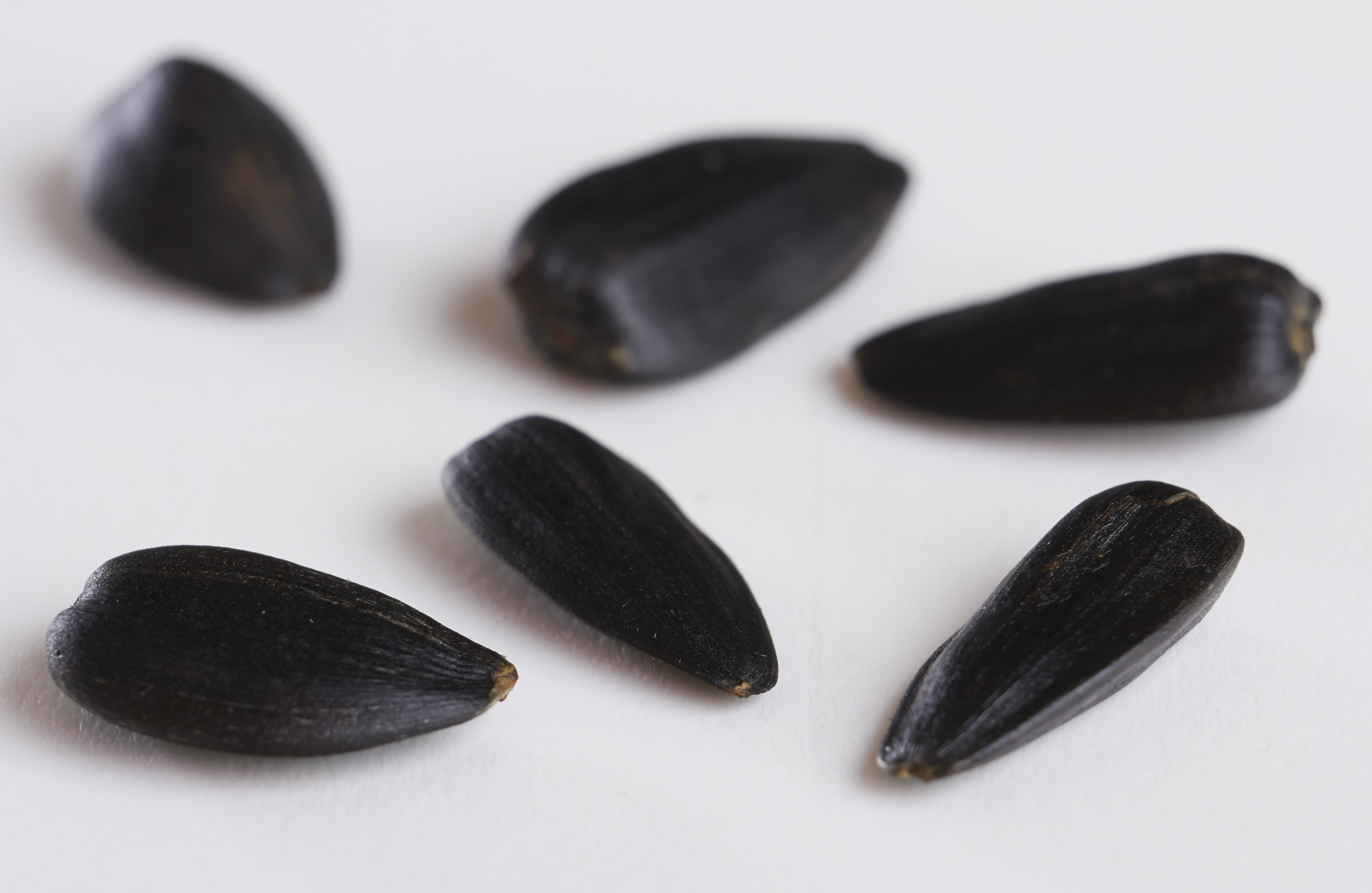
Sunflower seeds, as described by a Ukrainian woman to a Russian soldier

As a former marketer and journalist, Christian Borys has stated that the response to Saint Javelin, which sells the image on everything from tote bags to sweatshirts, flags and stickers, has been "overwhelming", with thousands of orders coming in each day. All profits from the sale of Saint Javelin goods goes to charities that assist Ukrainians. Some items sold by Saint Javelin are earmarked for specific efforts or causes in Ukraine. For example, shirts and other items sold as part of the 'rainbow collection' are earmarked to support LGBTQ+ Ukrainians who do not yet have full and equal rights in Ukraine.

Other items sold by Saint Javelin depict iconic and viral moments of defiance from Ukrainians during the Russian invasion of Ukraine that are considered 'memes of resistance' that have been made popular online. This includes references to a Ukrainian woman telling Russian soldiers to put sunflower seeds in their pockets so that they would grow where their bodies would lie in Ukraine, the statement from the defenders of Snake Island to a Russian warship that asked for their surrender who in turn replied 'Russian warship, go fuck yourself' and NAFO memes that refute Russian propaganda and disinformation online while collecting donations for Ukraine and the Georgian Legion in Ukraine.

== See also ==
- Ángel arcabucero – Angel depicted with a firearm
