= Space Forces (Ukraine) =

Proposed Space force branch of the Armed Forces of Ukraine

The Space Forces (Космічні війська, Kosmichni viys'ka) is a proposed Space force branch of the Armed Forces of Ukraine.

== History ==
=== Military space endeavors ===
Following independence, Ukraine supplied Russia with military satellites and their launch vehicles, and used the resources of the Russian Federal Space Agency until the Russian occupation of Crimea in 2014.

In August 2022, during the Russian invasion of Ukraine, Finnish manufacturer ICEYE signed a contract with the Serhiy Prytula Charity Foundation that would give the Armed Forces of Ukraine access to one of its satellites. The foundation crowdfunded the satellite for 600 million hryvnias by 18 August 2022. On 8 July 2024, the Ministry of Defence signed a Memorandum of understanding with ICEYE to further strengthen their cooperation in remote sensing of the Earth for defence purposes.

On 30 March 2025, the Ministry of Defence announced the creation of the Space Policy Directorate (Управління космічної політики, Upravlinnya kosmichnoyi polityky), with a focus on Satellite Communications, Intelligence and Reconnaissance and Missile Threat Early Warning. The directorate was also launched in order to respond to the Russian advantage in military space capabilities, including over 200 Russian satellites and the Russian Space Forces.

In 2026, due to increasing interference by Starlink owner Elon Musk against Ukraine's usage for defense, the Ukrainian government worked to establish UASAT, a low-earth orbit sovereign satellite internet constellation. The first test satellite, UASAT-NANO (also known as OBRIA NANO), was launched on 1 October 2026 on the SpaceX Falcon 9 Transporter-18 mission.

=== Space Forces ===
The Cabinet approved a Program of Government Activities, which was registered in the Verkhovna Rada on 23 September as a draft resolution. The plan called for updating the structure of the defense forces "in connection with the creation of the Space Forces," forming the legal and organizational foundations for operations by December 31, 2025, and a 2026 target for the cyber and space components to reach at least 60% operational readiness. The plan was submitted alongside a bill for approval of an agreement with the European Union to join the "Copernicus", "Space Weather Events" and "Near-Earth Objects" programmes.

On 9 November 2026, the Rada passed a bill in first reading to create the Space Forces as a branch alongside the Land Forces, Air Force, Navy and Unmanned Systems Forces.

== See also ==
- State Space Agency of Ukraine, civilian space agency
- Ukrainian Defense Industry
- Space force
