= NAFO (group) =

Pro-Ukraine social media movement

NAFO's logo, featuring its mascot. NAFO's logo and name are modeled after that of NATO.

The North Atlantic Fella Organization (NAFO, a play on NATO, the North Atlantic Treaty Organization) is an Internet meme and social media movement dedicated to countering Russian propaganda and disinformation about the 2022 Russian invasion of Ukraine. It has been categorised as a form of information warfare.

In addition to posting irreverent commentary about the war and memes promoting Ukraine or mocking the Russian war effort and strategy ("shitposting"), the group also raises funds for the Ukrainian military and other pro-Ukrainian causes. The representation of a NAFO "Fella" is a Shiba Inu dog (based on the Doge meme), often used as an avatar and sometimes described as a "cartoon dog", or a "group of Shiba Inu soldiers".

In August 2022, The Economist remarked that "NAFO's flippancy obscures its role as a remarkably successful form of information warfare." NAFO has attracted direct criticism from a number of pro-Russia outlets and figures including RT and Russian foreign ministry spokeswoman Maria Zakharova.

== History ==
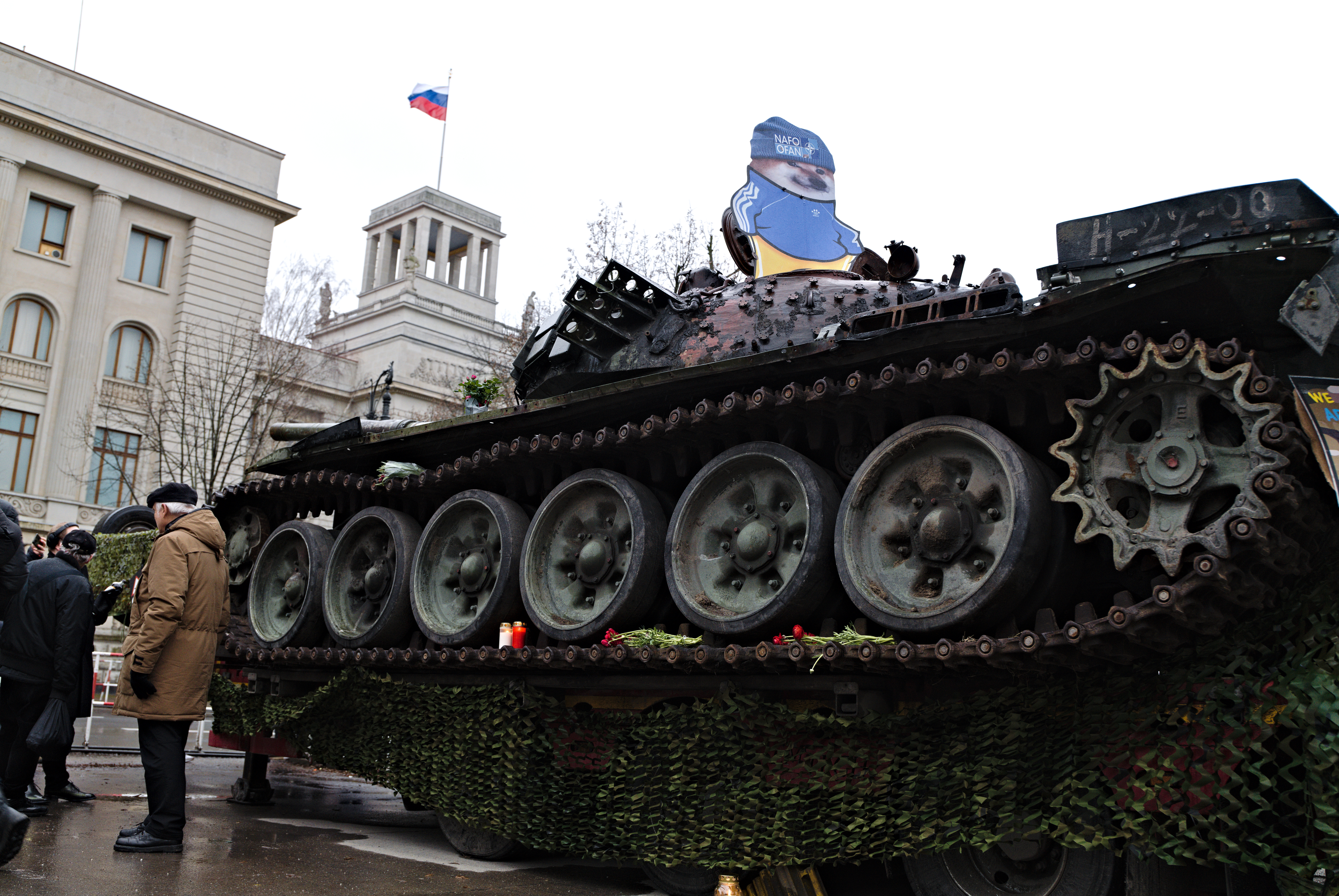
A NAFO "Fella" and a destroyed Russian tank in front of the Russian Embassy in Berlin

The meme was created in May 2022, when Twitter artist Kamil Dyszewski, under the handle @Kama_Kamilia, started adding modified pictures of a Shiba Inu dog (the "Fella") to photographs from Ukraine. NAFO, such as it is, was founded on 24 May 2022 with a tweet. The Shiba Inu breed has had an unrelated significant presence in online culture since at least 2010 under the 'doge' meme.

After some time, Dyszewski began creating custom "Fellas" for others who donated to the Georgian Legion. "Fellas", which comes from "fellow", is considered by NAFO to be a gender-neutral term. Current and retired service members from Ukrainian and NATO militaries, as well as Eastern Europeans and Eastern European diaspora, are heavily represented among those participating in the group's activities. The German paper Berliner Kurier estimates that the group includes "tens of thousands" of associates as of September 2022. The Fellas make appearances in various edited still images and "TikTok-style videos of Ukrainian troops set to dance music soundtracks", and are "spliced into war footage to mock Russia's military and praise Ukraine's soldiers". NAFO terms its opponents (online and on the battlefield) vatniks. Some NAFO members reportedly have an "especial focus" on defusing the "whataboutism" defense of the Russian invasion.

In June, the group rose to mainstream prominence after an interaction on Twitter between Russian diplomat Mikhail Ulyanov and a number of NAFO accounts with cartoon dogs as avatars. After Ulyanov claimed that the 2022 Russian invasion was justified by Ukraine allegedly shelling civilians in the Donbas since 2014, the following exchange ensued between Ulyanov and fella @LivFaustDieJung:

Ukraine Memes for NATO Teens (@LivFaustDieJung)
You: "we have to bomb all of Ukraine's civilians because Ukraine was fighting an internal war and some civilians got shelled"
Mikhail Ulyanov (@amb_ulyanov)
You pronounced this nonsense. Not me.

This response was seized upon by other NAFO members. The phrase "you pronounced this nonsense", or simply "pronouncing nonsense", came to be used by NAFO as a quick and dismissive way to mock pro-Russian accounts.

According to The Wall Street Journal, the group's pro-Ukrainian fundraising and merchandise sales are believed to total "over $1 million ... but no official tally is kept" so the claim cannot be independently verified. In August 2022, NAFO raised money for Signmyrocket.com, a website where people pay to have custom messages written on Ukrainian artillery shells and equipment. Task & Purpose described the result, a 2S7 Pion self-propelled artillery with the inscription "Super Bonker 9000" and a sticker of a baseball bat on the barrel with the inscription "NAFO-Article 69" as "self-propelled artillery that is bringing internet memes into terrestrial form".

In an article about the group's activities that August, The Economist reported that "Another popular slogan—'What air defence doing?'—pokes fun at the failure of Russian air defences to prevent an attack on Saky air base in Crimea on August 9th." The origin of the meme was a quote tweet in "dubious English" by @200_zoka (with airdefense idiosyncratically combined into one word) reacting to photos of smoke billowing up from the distant airfield.

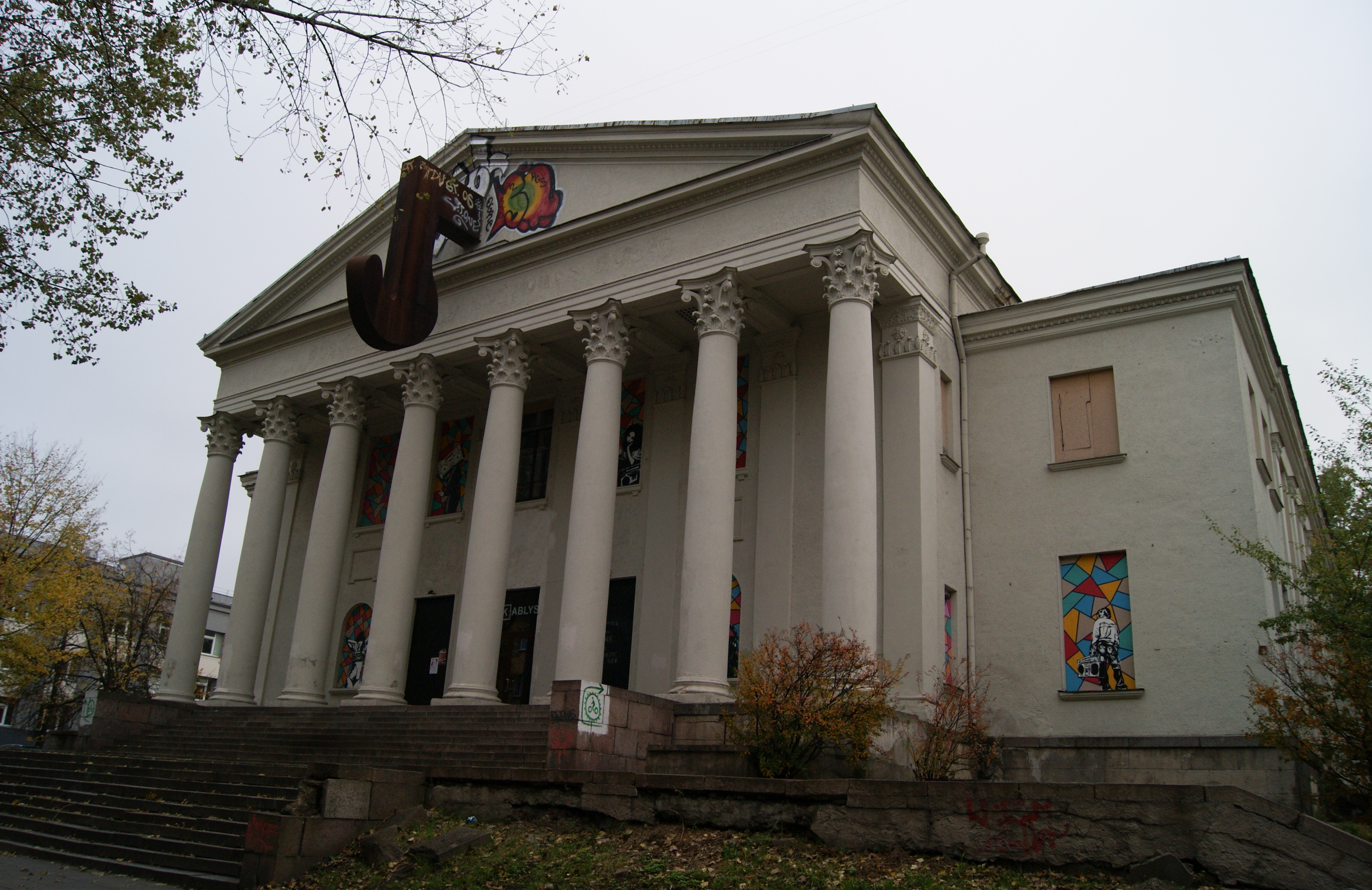
Kablys night club, site of the first NAFO summit, Vilnius, 2023

German state-supervised broadcaster ZDF rejects the notion that NAFO is an operation of the U.S. Central Intelligence Agency, stating that "the fact that 'Nafo' is financed by the CIA is just a self-deprecating joke among Twitterers." The joke was adopted by a number of Fellas themselves, changing their Twitter profiles to display their location as Langley, Virginia, the location of the CIA's headquarters.

On 8 July 2023, NAFO held their first summit in Vilnius, Lithuania, intended to coincide with NATO's 2023 Vilnius summit that occurred on 11–12 July. The summit's main livestreamed event was held at the Kablys night club in Vilnius, with a turnout of roughly 200 people in-person and thousands more online. Numerous high-profile political figures attended the summit, with Lithuanian Foreign Minister Gabrielius Landsbergis officially inaugurating the event and Estonian Prime Minister Kaja Kallas joining by video call. At the summit, a number of fundraising activities were hosted, including pro-Ukraine merchandise sales and an auction for an artwork depicting Ukrainian Defense Minister Oleksii Reznikov's personalized Fella.

== Reception ==
NAFO was described as a "Western civil society response to Russian campaigns" by Tobias Fella, a political scientist training Bundeswehr soldiers in dealing with social media. It is part of a larger "battle for sovereignty of interpretation" on shared online spaces. According to Politico, "To delve into NAFO is to get a crash course in how online communities from the Islamic State to the far-right boogaloo movement to this rag-tag band of online warriors have weaponized internet culture."

American media studies professor Jaime Cohen argues that the NAFO movement "is an actual tactical event against a nation state". British-Lebanese journalist Oz Katerji asserts that NAFO "has hampered Russia's propagandists and made them look absurd and ridiculous in the process". Ukraine's Ambassador to Australia and New Zealand Vasyl Myroshnychenko noted that the grassroots, decentralized nature of NAFO is an important part of its strength.

According to one analysis, "The largely English-language memes have kept Western attention on Ukraine's war—attention that is vital given the importance of Western arms to Ukrainian forces." American Lt. Col. Steve Speece of the Modern War Institute at West Point argues "Meme content shared in NAFO channels ... is almost exclusively English language and presumably not intended for Russian audiences ... These fora exist to generate content for the entertainment and status of their own members. Yet even Western national security policy is sometimes explicitly driven by the emotions—like outrage—cultivated in online communities." Speece argues that online agitators like NAFO take the role of bad cop in a good cop/bad cop dynamic with policy makers.

According to the Berliner Kurier, "Like real NATO, NAFO has an Article 5 duty of assistance. This means that each fella can call on the others for help if they are under attack or encounter serious disinformation. For this, the NAFO members use the hashtag #NAFOarticle5 and then receive support from other fellas." An analyst at the German Council on Foreign Relations assessed the strategy as being "very effective".

Russia has deployed troll farms effectively in the past; its confused reactions to NAFO may stem from its "turgid ideological propaganda about Ukraine". According to the cyber warfare unit of the U.S. Army, the 780th Military Intelligence Brigade, "For an online community like NAFO, hostile mention from an official propaganda outlet of its target is evidence its ridicule is achieving the desired effect."

In response to Estonian Prime Minister Kallas's praise of NAFO, Russia's Foreign Ministry spokesperson Maria Zakharova accused Western countries of hypocrisy stating, "NAFO personifies exactly what the European Union has seemed to be fighting until recently: hate speech, intolerance, trolling, spam, bullying, and all possible forms of xenophobia. Now the Estonian prime minister is openly showering this internet scum with gratitude, although it seems that until recently the 'advanced' Western democracies were hysterical over mythical 'pro-Kremlin trolls.'"

Some anti-war Russians criticized NAFO for its members' creation and sharing of image-based memes referencing a Russian tourist killed by a shark in Egypt. After an inflatable shark appeared on stage at NAFO's Vilnius summit, Anti-Corruption Foundation chairwoman and Russian opposition member Maria Pevchikh stated "Is the 'NAFO summit' in Vilnius actually celebrating on stage the death of a tourist eaten by a shark? 'Fighting Moscow with humor?' Am I the only [one] missing what's funny about a guy being eaten alive?" Similar sentiments were given by Alexei Navalny ally Leonid Volkov, who accosted the group for “helping Putin" and further writing on Twitter, "Putin's important propaganda line 'The West supports Ukraine because they just want to kill all the Russians' would have faded away... were it not for the constant help of NAFO." After the end of the Vilnius summit on July 10, NAFO tweeted: "What these Russian politicians don't understand is that every second they spend arguing with dogs online or worrying about their 'online harassment' with shark memes is seconds taken away from their focus on Ukraine. This is what we want. Continue to mald."

== Recognition ==
On 28 August 2022, the official Twitter account of the Ministry of Defense of Ukraine tweeted its appreciation of NAFO, with an image of missiles being fired and a "Fella" dressed in a combat uniform, hands on face, in a posture of appreciation.

High-ranking military and civil officials in Ukraine and NATO countries have changed their Twitter avatars to a Fella. Ukrainian Minister of Defense Oleksii Reznikov temporarily changed his Twitter avatar to a Fella commissioned in his honor, on 30 August 2022. In addition, Ukrainian President Volodymyr Zelenskyy and the country's official fundraising platform United24 recognized the group for its support in March 2023. On May 20, 2023, Lithuanian President Gitanas Nausėda publicly promoted NAFO's first summit in Vilnius and encouraged people to come to the city to attend.

Others have included former President of Estonia Toomas Hendrik Ilves, former Prime Minister of Estonia Kaja Kallas, Lithuanian Foreign Minister Gabrielius Landsbergis, United States Representative Adam Kinzinger, and United States Army Major General Patrick J. Donahoe.

On 13 July 2023, Kamil Dyszewski, on behalf of the organization, was presented the award the Star of Lithuanian Diplomacy by the Lithuanian Ministry of Foreign Affairs.

== See also ==
- Great Translation Movement
- IT Army of Ukraine
- Kilroy was here, a historic war meme
- Milk Tea Alliance
- Patron (dog)
- People's Bayraktar
- People's Satellite
- Russian web brigades
- Russo-Ukrainian cyberwarfare
- Saint Javelin
