= People's Satellite =

Ukrainian satellite

- Mission type: Earth observation satellite
- Operator: Ministry of Defence of Ukraine

Spacecraft properties
- Manufacturer: (Finland) ICEYE

The People's Satellite (Ukrainian: Народний супутник, romanized: Narodnyy suputnyk) is an ICEYE satellite acquired by the Serhiy Prytula Charity Foundation for the needs of the Armed Forces of Ukraine. It was called "people's" because it was purchased entirely with money donated by Ukrainians and people from other sovereign countries.

== Fundraising campaign ==
The deal was implemented after a series of fundraising projects to purchase the People's Bayraktar in June 2022. The Serhiy Prytula Foundation and blogger Ihor Lachenkov launched the initiative to raise funds to buy three Baykar Bayraktar TB2 drones. Ukrainians collected ₴600 million in a matter of days. The Turkish company Baykar provided three Bayraktar TB2 drones free of charge.

With the money not needed for its original purpose, the Foundation considered how to spend it most effectively for other needs of the Ukrainian army. The decision to purchase the satellite was made after negotiations with the Ministry of Defense of Ukraine, the Main Directorate of Intelligence of Ukraine, and the General Staff of the Ukrainian Armed Forces. Ukrainian space entrepreneur Max Polyakov, founder of EOS Data Analytics, was involved in negotiations due to his expertise in the satellite market.

In March 2022, at the beginning of the full-scale Russian invasion of Ukraine, Polyakov asked Earth Observation firms and space agencies that collect satellite imagery to share recent and real-time high-to-medium resolution optical and radar satellite imagery with Ukraine. EOS DA offered its capabilities to process that data.

== Agreement details ==
On August 18, 2022, ICEYE announced an agreement with the Serhiy Prytula Charity Foundation. As a result of the agreement, ICEYE provided the Ministry of Defence of Ukraine full access to one of its satellites, which is undisclosed due to security reasons. Also, ICEYE provided access to its constellation for tasking over Ukraine and neighboring territories. Additionally, ICEYE provided access to its constellation of SAR satellites, allowing the Ukrainian Armed Forces to receive radar satellite imagery on critical locations with a high revisit frequency.

== Characteristics ==
The resolution of satellite devices starts from 0.25 meters per pixel, depending on the area covered by the image. One picture can cover an area of up to 225 km^{2} (87 sq mi). The satellite is located at an altitude of 500–600 km (310–370 mi) above the Earth's surface. The satellite operates in a Sun-synchronous orbit. It makes 15 orbits around the Earth in a day and moves at a speed of approximately 7.5 km/s (17,000 mph). With the help of the ICEYE satellite, Ukraine can receive images in a few hours from the moment of image acquisition in space. The satellite was purchased with a three-year warranty which expired by 2024.

== Reported results ==
On September 29, 2022, Oleksii Reznikov, the Minister of Defence of Ukraine, reported that during the first two days of the satellite's operation, more than 60 units of enemy military equipment were discovered.

On March 9, 2023, The Main Directorate of Intelligence of the Ministry of Defence of Ukraine reported that during the 5 months of use of the ICEYE satellite, employees of the agency detected 360 tents of the Russian military on Ukrainian land, as well as 7,321 objects of Russian military and special equipment.

By May 2026, the Main Directorate reported receiving over 5,900 images from the satellite.

== See also ==
- Starlink
- UASAT
- List of Ukrainian satellites
