= List of Ukrainian satellites =

This list covers all artificial satellites built or operated by institutions or companies from Ukraine since the country's independence in 1991.

Launched
#	Name	COSPAR ID	Purpose	Consortium	Launch date	Launch vehicle	Launch site	Ref
1	Sich-1	1995-046A	Earth observation	Yuzhmash, Yuzhnoye	31 August 1995	Tsyklon-3	Plesetsk	
2	Okean-O	1999-039A	Oceanography	Yuzhmash, Yuzhnoye	17 July 1999	Zenit-2	Baikonur	
3	Sich-1M	2004-052A	Earth observation	Yuzhmash, Yuzhnoye	24 December 2004	Tsyklon-3	Plesetsk	
4	MK-1TS	2004-052C	Technology demonstration	Yuzhmash, Yuzhnoye	24 December 2004	Tsyklon-3	Plesetsk	
5	Sich-2	2011-044G	Earth observation	Yuzhmash, Yuzhnoye	17 August 2011	Dnepr	Yasny	
6	PolyITAN-1	2014-033AJ	Education	Kyiv Polytechnic Institute	19 June 2014	Dnepr	Yasny	
7	PolyITAN-2-SAU	1998-067MM	Education	Kyiv Polytechnic Institute	18 August 2017	Atlas V, Cygnus, ISS	Cape Canaveral	
8	Sich-2-30	2022-002AY	Earth observation	Yuzhmash, Yuzhnoye	13 January 2022	Falcon 9 Transporter-3	Cape Canaveral	
9	People's Satellite	N/A	Earth observation	ICEYE, Ministry of Defence of Ukraine	N/A (acquired in 2022)	N/A	N/A	
10	EOS SAT-1	2023-001AW	Earth observation	EOS Data Analytics, Dragonfly Aerospace	3 January 2023	Falcon 9 Transporter-6	Cape Canaveral	
11	PolyITAN-HP-30	2023-001CA	Education	Kyiv Polytechnic Institute	3 January 2023	Falcon 9 Transporter-6	Cape Canaveral	
12	UASAT-NANO	2026-227BW	Satellite internet	GomSpace, STETMAN	1 October 2026	Falcon 9 Transporter-18	SLC-4E	
Built for other countries
1	EgyptSat1	2007-012A	Earth observation	Yuzhmash, Yuzhnoye	17 April 2007	Dnepr	Baikonur	

Future
Name	Purpose	Consortium	Launch date	Launch vehicle	Launch site	Ref

Cancelled
Name	Purpose	Consortium	Ref
Lybid 1	Communication	MDA Space, ISS Reshetnev, Ukrkosmos	
Ionosat-Micro	Ionosphere research	Yuzhnoye, NASU	

== Gallery ==
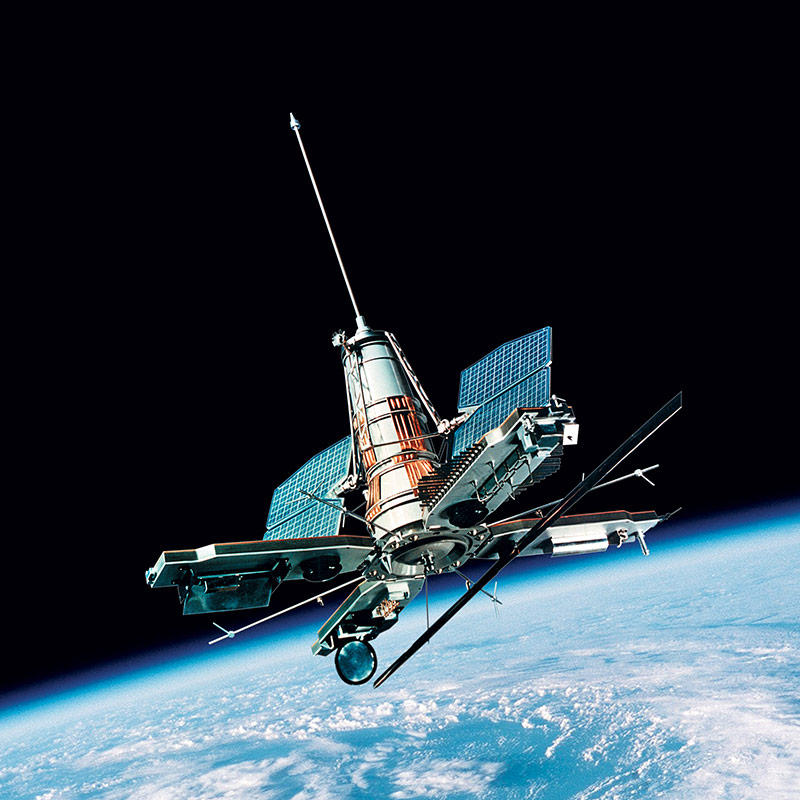
Sich-1

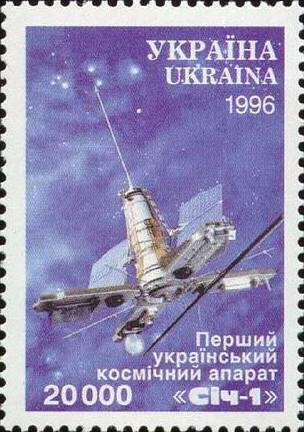
Sich-1

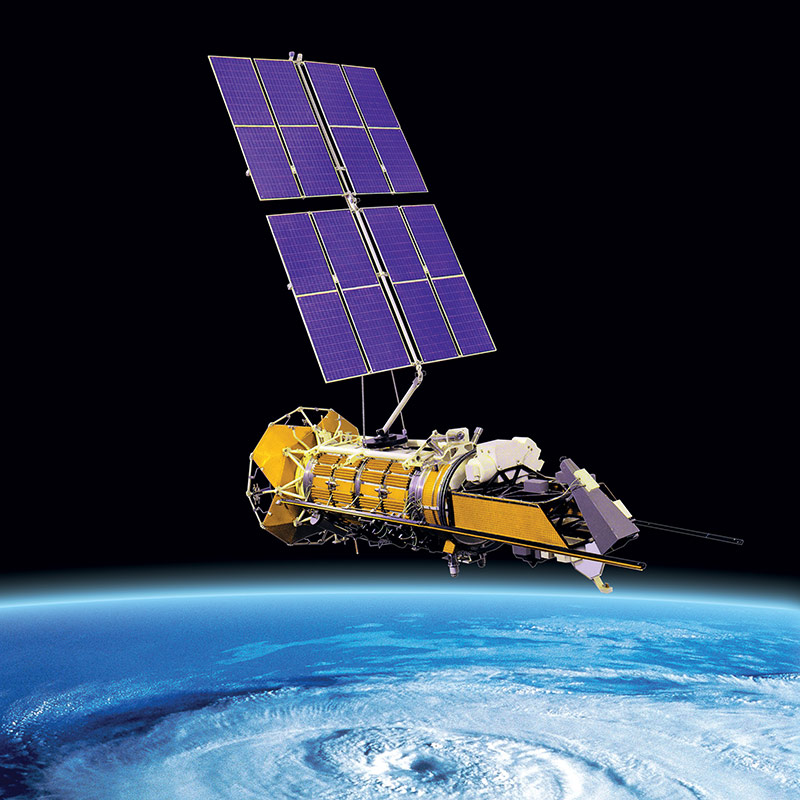
Okean-O

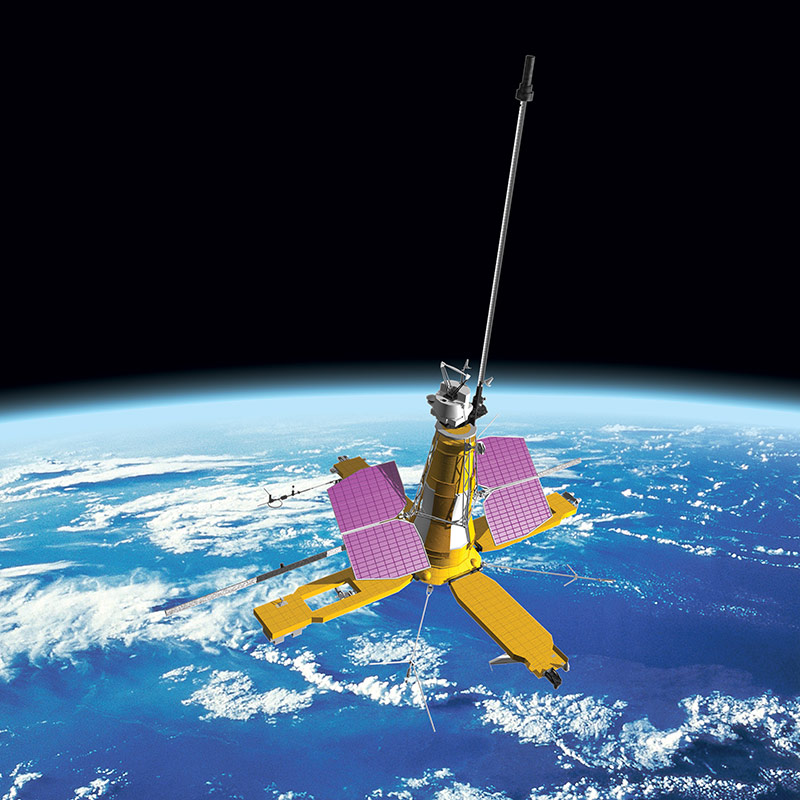
Sich-1M

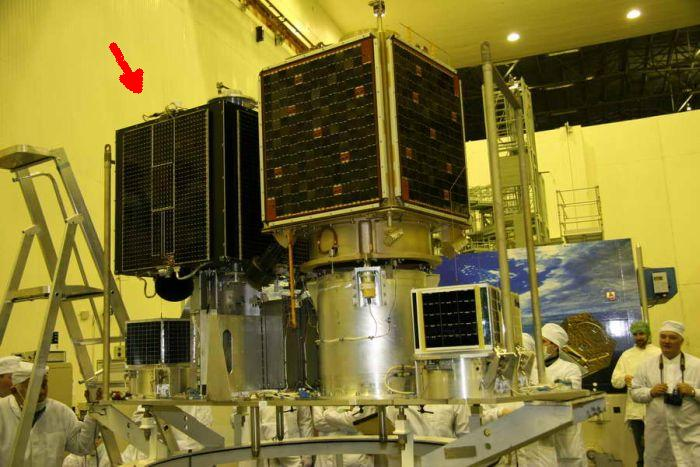
EgyptSat1 (left) and Saudi Sat 3

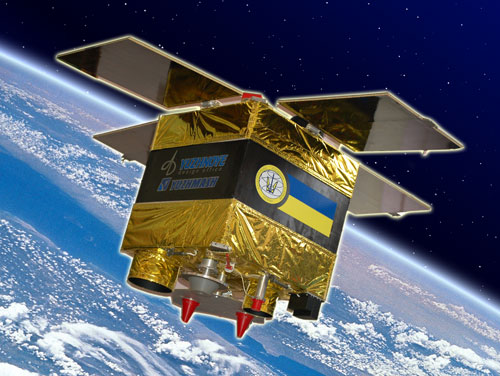
Sich-2

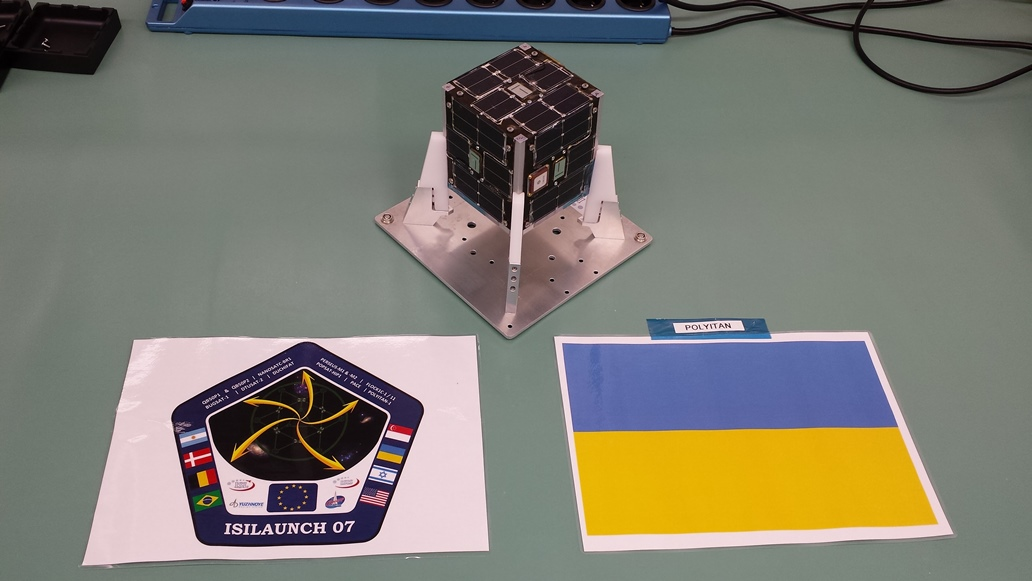
PolyITAN-1

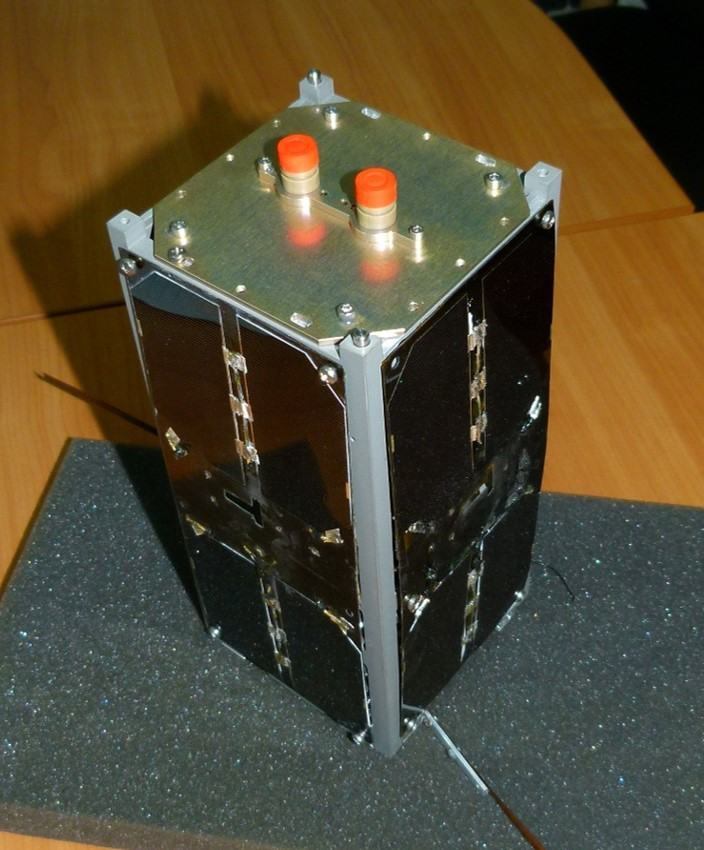
PolyITAN-2

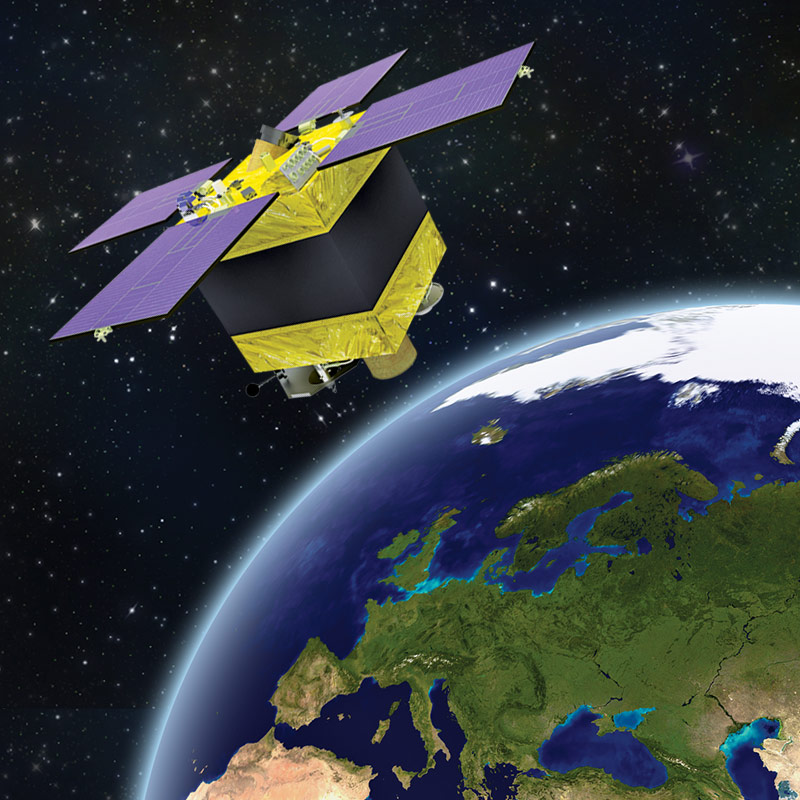
Sich-2-30

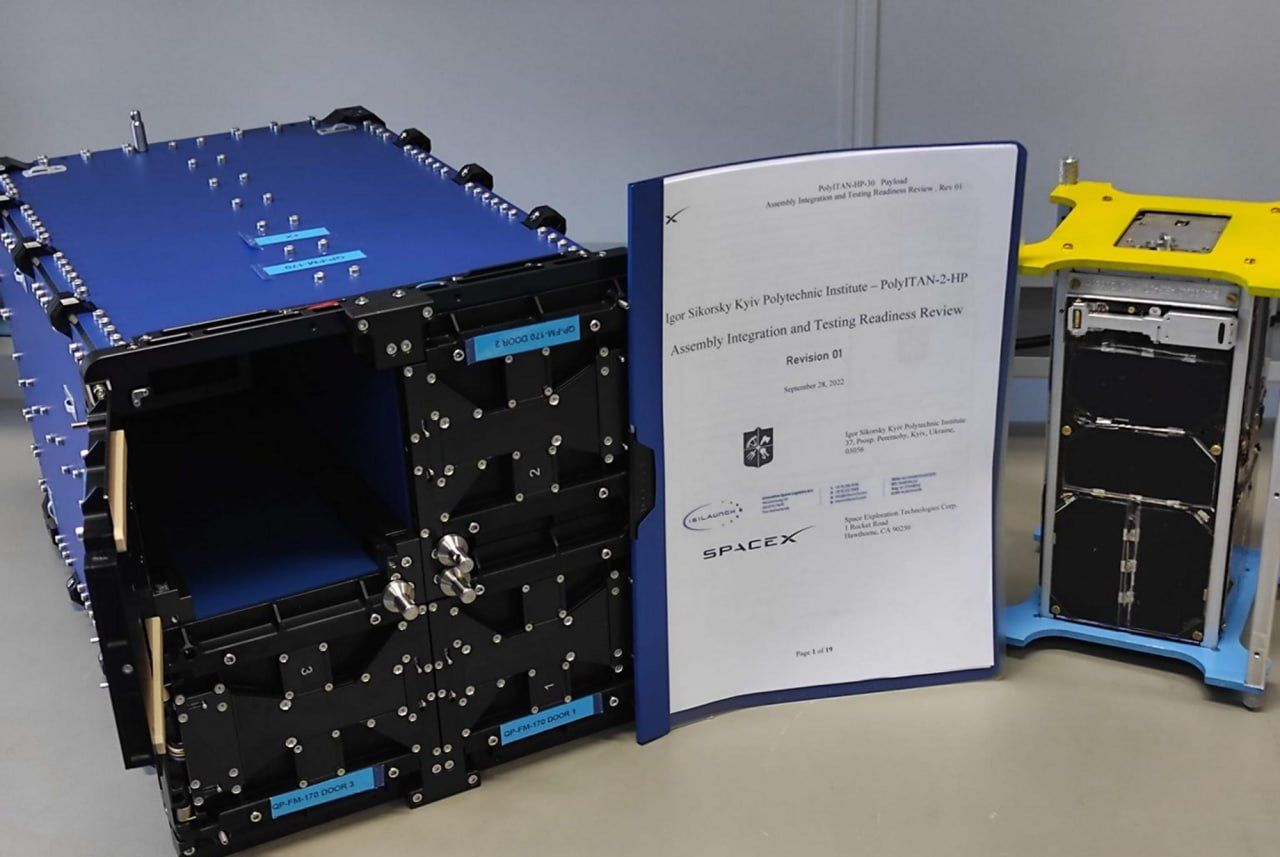
PolyITAN-HP-30

== See also ==
- List of Czech satellites
- List of Polish satellites
- List of Slovak satellites
- List of Slovenian satellites
