= SETS (company) =

SETS (Space Electric Thruster Systems)
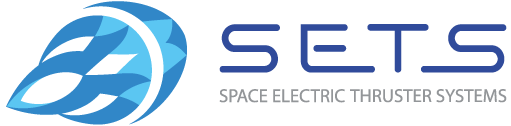
- Type: Private
- Industry: Aerospace
- Founded: 2016
- Founder: Viktor Serbin
- Headquarters: Dnipro, Ukraine
- Website: https://sets.space/

SETS (Space Electric Thruster Systems) is a Ukrainian aerospace company. The company specializes in manufacturing environmentally friendly electric propulsion systems and subsystems for spacecraft.

SETS is a part of the Noosphere Ventures’ portfolio, established in 2015 by international entrepreneur Max Polyakov.

== History ==
SETS was founded by Viktor Serbin, in Dnipro, Ukraine, in 2016. In June 2018, SETS received the Seal of Excellence Certificate from the European Commission.

In 2020, the company signed its first commercial contract to undergo field testing in Low Earth Orbit (LEO) as part of the debut launch of the Firefly Aerospace Alpha rocket.

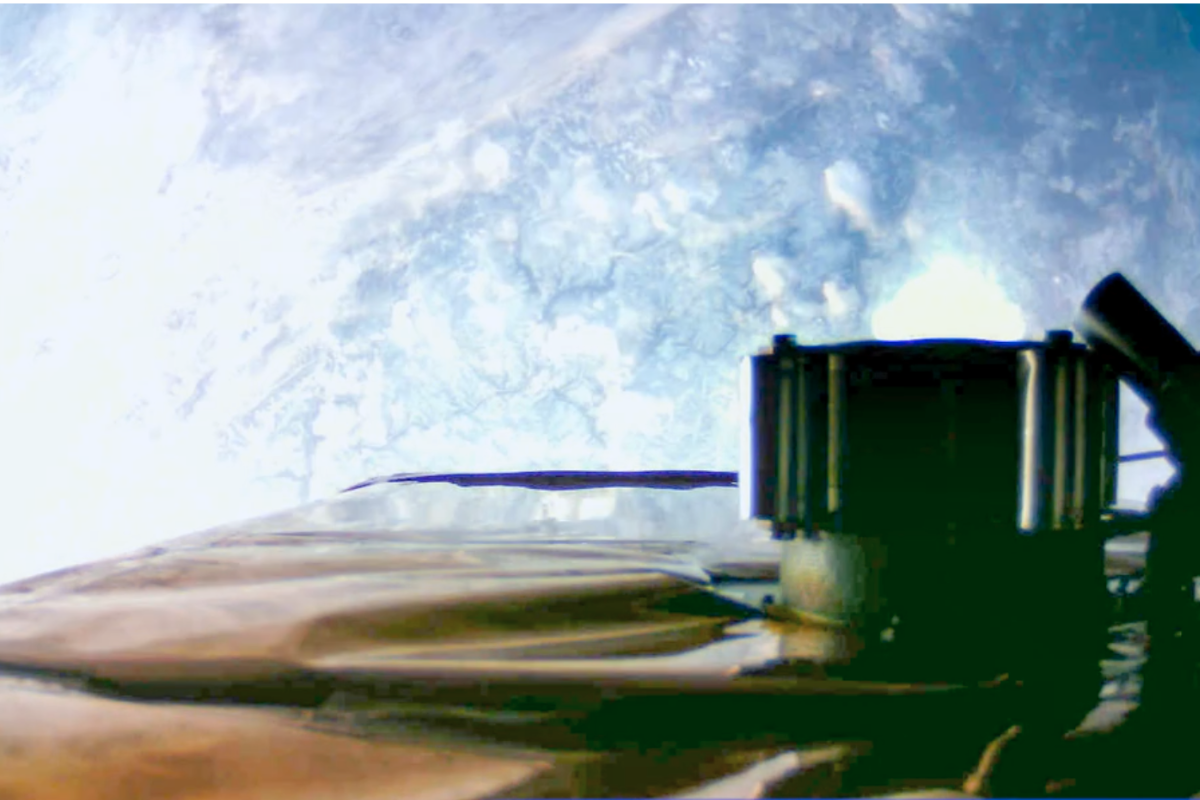
SPS-25 system successful propulsion test on EOSSAT-1

In 2023, the first space propulsion system developed by SETS demonstrated successful performance in orbit during the EOS SAT-1 flight.

In 2024, SETS secured an international contract to deliver Hall Thrusters to South Korea’s EPS Tech, a leading producer of satellite electrical power systems (EPS). According to the contract, SETS produced two ST-25 Hall Thrusters for EPS Tech.

Since 2020, the company's ST-25 and ST-40 thrusters were listed in the NASA "State-of-the-Art Small Spacecraft Technology Report".

SETS regularly participates in leading international conferences and events dedicated to the Aerospace industry such as Space propulsion, Space Tech Expo, 72nd International Astronautical Congress, 36th International Electric Propulsion Conference, Construction program. Also, SETS team members are often being invited as speakers to the research and professional propulsion technology events with showcases and presentations.

=== Overview ===
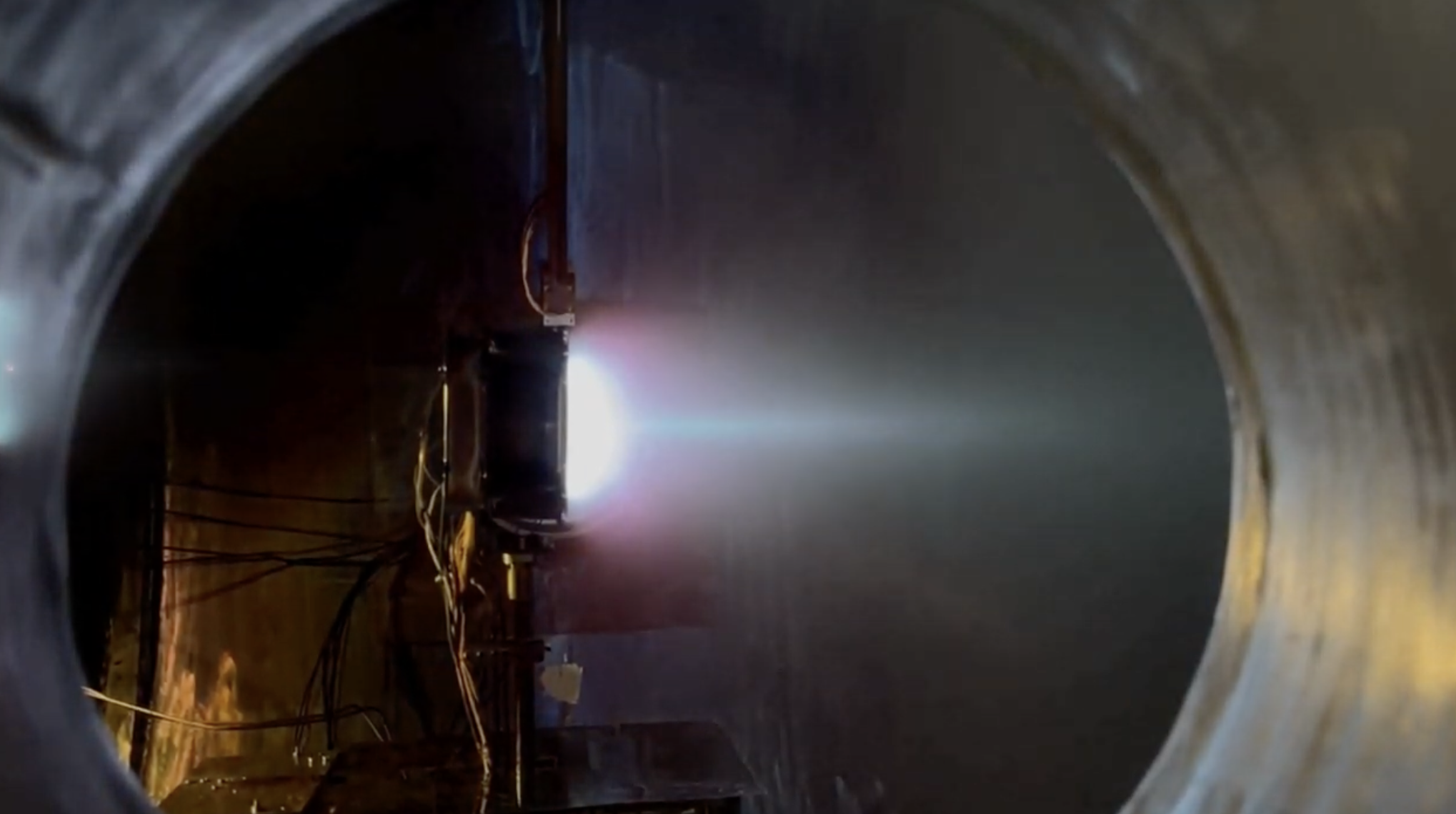
ST-100 on site vacuum chamber test

SETS developments are designed for applications onboard spacecraft in LEO, MEO and GEO. SETS's technologies have stabilisation of satellite orbit parameters, and the ability to perform orbital maneuvers, deep space missions, and deorbiting using environmentally friendly working substances. The SETS team consists of 30 professionals, including six Ph.Ds. The company manufactures and tests Hall Thrusters, Xenon Storage and Feed Systems, and Power Processing Units.

SETS provides effective in-space propulsion that helps reposition satellites, avoid collisions with space debris, and adapt to changing mission needs.

== Products ==
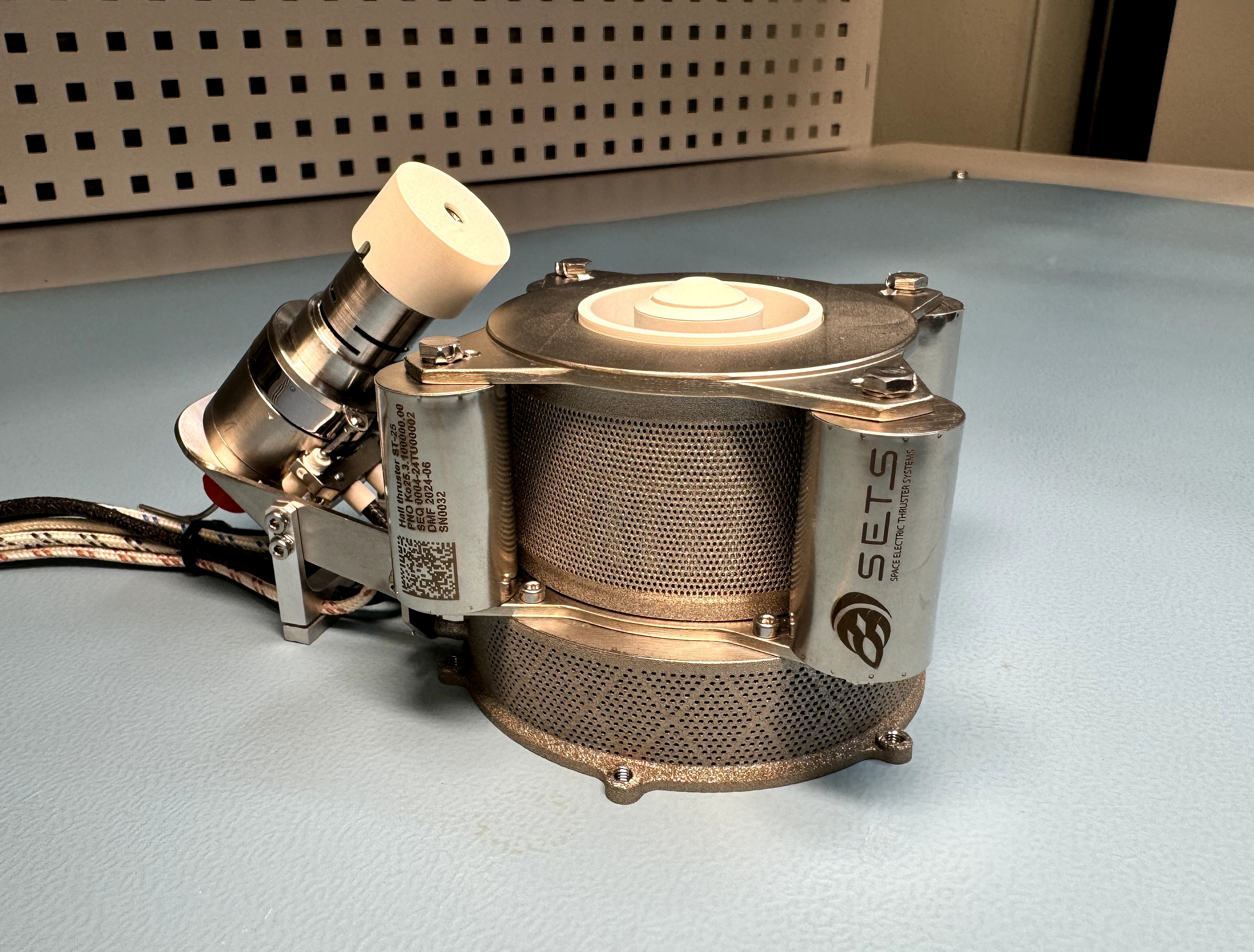
ST-25 Hall thruster

=== Electric propulsion systems ===
- The SPS-25 Propulsion System was designed for satellites mass up to 500 kg. The propulsion system is used to adjust the positions of satellites and deorbit them after the finish of their operational lifespan. SPS-25 consists of ST-25 Hall Thruster, Xenon feed system, Power processing unit.The SPS-25 Propulsion System was installed and successfully tested in orbit on the EOS SAT-1 satellite, which was developed by Dragonfly Aerospace for EOS Data Analytics.
- The SPS-40 Propulsion System, designed for satellites up to 1000 kg, and consists of ST-40 Hall-effect Thruster(s), Xenon storage and feed system, Power Processing Unit. The SPS-40 Propulsion System is designed for a power consumption of 300-500 W and can provide a total impulse of up to 350 kN∙s. Its primary purpose is to adjust orbit parameters and improve the manoeuvrability of satellites in space.
- The SPS-100 Propulsion System is designed for medium and large satellites that can provide power to the propulsion system from 1000 W to 1600 W. SPS-100 consists of ST-100 Hall-effect Thruster(s), Xenon storage and feed system and power processing unit.

=== Subsystems ===
Hall-Effect Thrusters

- The ST-25 Hall-Effect Thruster is marked by a notable departure in its magnet system from the conventional setup. In this modification, a permanent magnet replaces the traditional electromagnet as the central magnet core. This technology results in a reduction in the power consumption of the thruster, contributing to enhanced efficiency.
- The ST-40 Hall-Effect Thruster is engineered to serve as a component within the propulsion system tailored for satellites weighing up to 1 ton. The propulsion system that contains ST-40 can be used on satellites for various purposes including stabilization, orientation and deorbiting.
- The ST-100, a 1.5 kW Hall-Effect Thruster, is built for a diverse array of spacecraft applications. It offers orbit parameter maintenance, orbital manoeuvres, and contributions to deep space missions. The thruster's components are manufactured using additive technologies, a method that has markedly improved part accuracy and established an automated production process.

Power Processing Units

- The Power Processing Unit (PPU) serves to provide power and control electric propulsion subsystems. It is designed according to space standards and is able to transform onboard voltage to power a Hall Thruster from 200W to 500 W.

Feed Systems

- The Xenon Feed System (XFS) is designed to reduce mass and cost while simultaneously improving system reliability. It's modular, adaptable, and scalable, making it suitable for a variety of missions in Low-Earth Orbit (LEO) and Geostationary Earth Orbit (GEO).
