= Signmyrocket.com =

Crowdfunding website for the Armed Forces of Ukraine

Signmyrocket.com is a crowdfunding website that offers people to pay to have their messages written on ammunition and equipment used by the Armed Forces of Ukraine following the 2022 Russian invasion of Ukraine. For a donation ranging from $40 to thousands of dollars, Ukrainian soldiers write a message with permanent marker on ammunition and send the customer a photo or a video of the shell being fired at the Russian Armed Forces. The donations are sent to the Centre for Assistance to the Army, Veterans and Their Families, which buys equipment for the Armed Forces of Ukraine.

The crowdfunding platform began in May 2022 on a Telegram channel created by Ukrainian IT student Anton Sokolenko. In July 2022, his partner Ivan Kolesnyk and WebDeal Digital Agency, created a website for crowdfunding platform to facilitate access for international customers, optimize most processes and scale the project to new level. In January 2023, Sokolenko stated that the largest ammunition sales are from the United States with Finland in second place.

As of 5 March 2025, the website has raised over $1,929,933 and purchased 112 cars, 125 drones, 59 Starlink terminals, 66 communication devices and $500,000 worth of other equipment.

== See also ==
- People's Bayraktar
- Saint Javelin
- United24
