= Hitwise =

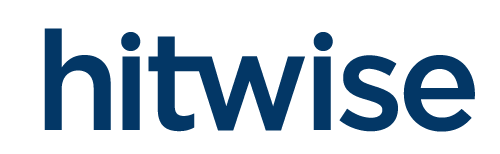
- Industry: Marketing, Digital Media
- Founded: 1997
- Headquarters: Los Angeles, California
- Products: AudienceView
- Owner: Connexity
- Number of employees: 250
- Website: http://www.hitwise.com

Hitwise is a division of Connexity, that measures behavior across desktop, tablet and smartphone devices.

The service provides data on trends in visitor and search behavior, visitor and website profiling and measures website market share.

In 2006, Hitwise was valued at £180m and was subsequently acquired by Experian for $240m on 19 April 2007.

In 2015, Hitwise was acquired by Digital marketing company, Connexity, in a combined deal worth $47 Million on 14 December 2015.

== History ==
Hitwise was founded in 1997 in Melbourne by Adrian Giles and Andrew Barlow. Adrian Giles acted as Managing Director from 1997 to 2000. Andrew Barlow acted as Chairman and Joint-Managing Director from 1997 to 2000. It launched the "competitive intelligence" service in 2000; a service that allows subscription access to Hitwise's reports.

In 2001 Hitwise launched in New Zealand, Hong Kong, United Kingdom and Singapore. In 2003 Hitwise launched in the United States. In 2006 Hitwise purchased HitDynamics, a bid management and web analytics platform. In 2009 Hitwise launched in Canada and Brazil. In 2010 Hitwise launched in France and India.

=== Acquisitions ===
- Hitwise was acquired by Experian in 2007.
- Hitwise was acquired by Connexity in 2015.
- Hitwise closed in 2020.

== See also ==
Competitors in the internet market research space include Nielsen, Alexa, comScore, Netcraft, Quantcast, and SimilarWeb.
