= PolyITAN =

Series of Ukrainian CubeSat satellites

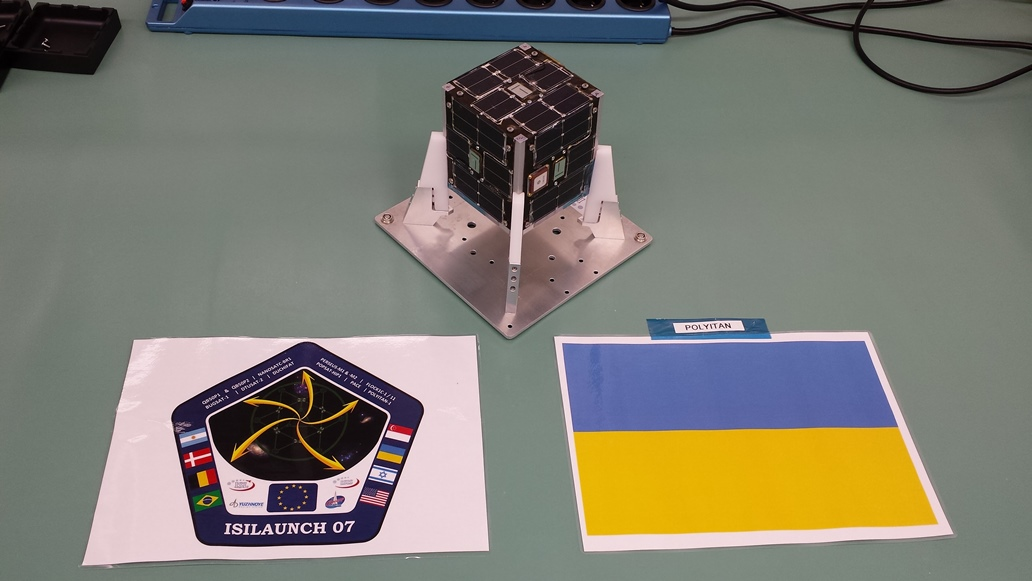
- PolyITAN-1 before launch
- Designer: Kyiv Polytechnic Institute
- Country of origin: Ukraine
- Website: cubesat.com.ua/en

Specifications
- Spacecraft type: 1U, 2U CubeSat

Production
- Launched: 3
- Maiden launch: 19 June 2014
- Last launch: 3 January 2023

The PolyITAN satellite series comprises three CubeSat-type nanosatellites developed by the Kyiv Polytechnic Institute (KPI) in Ukraine and launched to low Earth orbit between 2014 and 2023. The satellites support the education of students at KPI, serve the amateur radio community, and test new spaceflight technologies. In 2026, the first of the satellites, PolyITAN-1, was celebrated as the longest operating Ukrainian spacecraft after continuously transmitting telemetry for 12 years.

== Satellites ==
PolyITAN satellites
Name	COSPAR ID	Satellite bus	Launch date	Launch vehicle	Launch site
PolyITAN-1	2014-033AJ	1U CubeSat	19 June 2014	Dnepr	Yasny
PolyITAN-2-SAU	1998-067MM	2U CubeSat	18 August 2017	Atlas V, Cygnus, ISS	Cape Canaveral
PolyITAN-HP-30	2023-001CA	2U CubeSat	3 January 2023	Falcon 9 Transporter-6	Cape Canaveral

== See also ==
- List of Ukrainian satellites
