= Space force =

Military branch for space warfare

A space force is a military branch of a nation's armed forces that conducts military operations in outer space and space warfare. The world's first space force was the Russian Space Forces, established in 1992 as an independent military service. However, it lost its independence twice, first absorbed into the Strategic Rocket Forces between 1997 and 2001 and between 2001 and 2011. Then it merged into the Russian Air Force to form the Russian Aerospace Forces in 2015, where it is a sub-branch. As of 2026, there are two independent space forces: the United States Space Force and China's People's Liberation Army Aerospace Force.

Countries with smaller or developing space forces may combine their air and space forces under a single military branch, such as the Russian Aerospace Forces, Spanish Air and Space Force, French Air and Space Force, or Iranian Islamic Revolutionary Guard Corps Aerospace Force, or put them in an independent defense agency, such as the Indian Defence Space Agency. Countries with nascent military space capabilities usually organize them within their air forces.

== History ==
The first artificial object to cross the Kármán line, the boundary between air and space, was MW 18014, an A-4 rocket launched by the German Heer on 20 June 1944 from the Peenemünde Army Research Center. The A4, more commonly known as the V-2, was the world's first ballistic missile, used by the Wehrmacht to launch long-range attacks on the Allied Forces on the Western Front during the Second World War. The designer of the A4, Wernher von Braun, had aspirations to use them as space launch vehicles. In both the United States and the Soviet Union, military space development began immediately after the Second World War concluded, with Wernher von Braun defecting to the Allies and both superpowers gathering V-2 rockets, research materials, and German scientists to jumpstart their own ballistic missile and space programs.

In the United States, there was a fierce interservice rivalry between the nascent U.S. Air Force and U.S. Army over which service would gain responsibility for the military space program. The Air Force, which had started developing its space program while it was still the Army Air Forces in 1945, saw space operations as an extension of its strategic airpower mission, while the Army argued that ballistic missiles were an extension of artillery. In 1946, the Navy began developing rockets primarily for Naval Research Laboratory projects rather than seeking to actively develop an operational space capability. Ultimately, the Air Force's space rivals in the Army Ballistic Missile Agency, Naval Research Laboratory, and Advanced Research Projects Agency were absorbed by NASA when it was created in 1958, leaving it as the only major military space organization within the U.S. Department of Defense. In 1954, General Bernard Schriever established the Western Development Division within Air Research and Development Command, becoming the U.S. military's first space organization, which continues to exist in the U.S. Space Force as the Space Systems Command, its research and development center.

During the 1960s and 1970s, Air Force space forces were organized within Aerospace Defense Command for missile defense and space surveillance forces, Strategic Air Command for weather reconnaissance satellites, and Air Force Systems Command for satellite communications, space launch, and space development systems. In 1982, U.S. Air Force space forces were centralized in Air Force Space Command, the first direct predecessor to the U.S. Space Force. U.S. space forces were first employed in the Vietnam War, and continued to provide satellite communications, weather, and navigation support during the 1982 Falklands War, 1983 United States invasion of Grenada, 1986 United States bombing of Libya, and 1989 United States invasion of Panama. The first major employment of space forces culminated in the Gulf War, where they proved so critical to the U.S.-led coalition, that it is sometimes referred to as the first space war. The first discussions of creating a military space service in the United States occurred in 1958, with the idea being floated by President Reagan as well in 1982. The 2001 Space Commission argued for the creation of a Space Corps between 2007 and 2011 and a bipartisan proposal in the U.S. Congress would have created a Space Corps in 2017. Then on 20 December 2019, the United States Space Force Act, part of the National Defense Authorization Act for 2020, was signed, creating an independent space service by renaming and reorganizing Air Force Space Command into the United States Space Force.

In the Soviet Union, the early space program was led by the OKB-1 design bureau, led by Sergei Korolev. Unlike in the United States, where the U.S. Air Force held preeminence in missile and space development, the Soviet Ground Forces, and specifically the Artillery of the Reserve of the Supreme High Command (RVGK), was responsible for missile and military space programs, with the RVGK responsible for the launch of Sputnik 1, the world's first artificial satellite on 4 October 1957. In 1960, Soviet military space forces were reorganized into the 3rd Department of the Main Missile Directorate of the Ministry of Defence, before in 1964 becoming a part of the new Soviet Strategic Rocket Forces Central Directorate of Space Assets. The Strategic Rocket Forces Central Directorate of Space Assets would be renamed the Main Directorate of Space Assets in 1970, being transferred to directly report to the Soviet Ministry of Defense in 1982, and in 1986 became the Chief Directorate of Space Assets. Established in 1967, the Anti-Ballistic Missile and Anti-Space Defense Forces of the Soviet Air Defense Forces were responsible for space surveillance and defense operations.

When the Soviet Union collapsed in 1991, the Russian Federation gained its space forces, with the Chief Directorate of Space Assets was reorganized into the Military Space Forces, an independent troops (vid) under the Russian Ministry of Defense, but not a military service (vid). The Soviet Air Defense Forces' Anti-Ballistic Missile and Anti-Space Defense Forces were reorganized into the Russian Air Defense Forces' Rocket and Space Defence Troops. In 1997, the Rocket and Space Defence Troops and Military Space Forces were merged into the Strategic Missile Forces; it subordinated the priorities of the space troops to the missile forces, resulting in the establishment of the Russian Space Forces as independent troops in 2001. In 2011, the Russian Space Forces became the Russian Space Command, part of the Russian Aerospace Defense Forces, which merged Russia's space and air defense forces into one service. In 2015, the Russian Air Force and Russian Aerospace Defense Forces were merged to form the Russian Aerospace Forces, which reestablished the Russian Space Forces as one of its three sub-branches, although it is no longer an independent entity.

In 1998, the Chinese People's Liberation Army began creating its space forces under the General Armaments Department, before being reorganized and renamed as the People's Liberation Army Strategic Support Force Space Systems Department in 2015. The PLASSF was eventually dissolved in April 2024, with the space force element of the SSF becoming the People's Liberation Army Aerospace Force.

In 2010, the French Armed Forces created the Joint Space Command, a joint organism under the authority of the Chief of the Defence Staff. In 2019, the French President Emmanuel Macron announced that the Joint Space Command would become the Space Command and the newest major command of the Air Force, which would be renamed to reflect an "evolution of its mission" into the area of outer space. The Space Command is effective since 2019 and the Air Force was renamed Air and Space Force on 24 July 2020, with its new logo unveiled on 11 September 2020.

In 22 April 2020, the Iranian Islamic Revolutionary Guard Corps Aerospace Force announced the existence of its own "Space Command" together with the launch its first military satellite, the Noor, into orbit. Differently from other air and space forces, the Aerospace Force is subordinate to the Islamic Revolutionary Guard Corps (IRGC) instead of the Iranian Air Force.

In June 2022, the Spanish Government announced the Spanish Air Force would be renamed as the Spanish Air and Space Force. On July 1, 2025, the Netherlands renamed the Royal Netherlands Air Force to the Royal Netherlands Air and Space Force.

In 2025, the Verkhovna Rada of Ukraine passed a law approving the creation of a Space Force branch of the Armed Forces of Ukraine. The creation of a separate space component would update Ukraine's space capabilities and counteract the Russian Space Forces.

== Space forces ==
=== Operational ===
The following list outlines the independent space forces that have been in operation:

- United States Space Force (2019–present)
- (China) People's Liberation Army Aerospace Force (2024–present)
- (Russia) Russian Space Forces (2015–present; independent from 1992–1997 and 2001–2011)
Emblems of space forces

Delta insignia of the United States Space Force

Flag of the People's Liberation Army, used by the People's Liberation Army Aerospace Force

Insignia of the Russian Space Forces

=== Proposed ===
- (Philippines) Philippine Space Force
- (Ukraine) Ukrainian Space Forces

== See also ==
- Ranks and insignia of space forces
- Militarisation of space
- Politics of outer space
- Space Force Association
