= Cupid.com =

Online dating website

- Website type: Online dating service
- Headquarters: London, UK
- Website: Cupid.com
- Commercial: Yes
- Registration: Required for membership
- Launched: 1 June 2002; 24 years ago
- Current status: active

Cupid.com is an online dating website previously owned by Cupid plc, a company originally called Easydate, that was based in Edinburgh.

== History ==
The Cupid.com dating website launched in the United Kingdom on 1 June 2002. Edinburgh based Easydate purchased Cupid.com for £4.4 million in 2010, but had been operating Cupid.com in non-US markets, via a licensing agreement, previously. Easydate was later renamed as Cupid plc, after legal discussions with easyGroup, who had concerns about the name.

Following a BBC investigation, the website was accused of using fake profiles to entice customers in 2013. The company subsequently commissioned KPMG to investigate, who found that there was “no evidence of a company-organised practice”. The company was criticised for staff profiles not being transparently labelled as such, which the company committed to rectify in the future.

Cupid.com was significantly impacted by new market entrants such as Tinder. This led to Cupid plc selling their last online dating assets, including Cupid.com, for £3 million in 2014.

== Wingman Barney ==
Cupid.com launched a feature called Wingman Barney. This was a virtual wingman that helped people to start a conversation with someone they liked.

== Redesign ==
In June 2016, the website was totally redesigned and rebranded. New features such as Quiz-matching and Likebook were introduced, along with a refreshed user interface.
