= Max Polyakov =

Ukrainian and American entrepreneur

- Макс Поляков

Personal details
- Born: Maksym Valeriyovych Polyakov; Максим Валерійович Поляков; 30 June 1977 (age 49) Zaporizhzhia, Ukraine
- Children: 4
- Education: Oles Honchar Dnipro National University
- Occupation: Businessman and philanthropist Managing Partner of Noosphere Ventures; Former co-owner of Firefly Aerospace

Maksym "Max" Polyakov (born 30 June 1977) is an international technology entrepreneur, investor, economist, and philanthropist from Ukraine. Polyakov is a general partner in the venture fund Noosphere Ventures Partners LP which invests in a number of global technology companies.

Polyakov follows the concept of Ukrainian scientist Volodymyr Vernadsky who claimed that knowledge is the driving force behind every further positive development on Earth. Polyakov believes that space-based technologies can and should be used to solve problems on Earth.

== Education ==
Maksym "Max" Polyakov was born in Zaporizhzhia, Ukraine. In high school, Polyakov won competitions in math and physics, then scholarships. In 2001, Polyakov graduated from Zaporizhzhia State Medical University as an obstetrician-gynecologist.

In 2013, Polyakov was awarded a Ph.D. in International Economics and in 2019, earned a Doctor of Economic Sciences.

He is a co-author of philosophical and scientific works on noospherology, semiotics, and innovation in economics.

Max Polyakov owns 18 patents.

== Business ==
While studying at university, Polyakov launched his first software outsourcing business. Following the success of his first venture, he set up a number of successful tech businesses.

Polyakov co-founded the IDE Group which included the companies Cupid, Murka, HitDynamics and Maxymiser in 2005. Polyakov took Cupid public on the London Stock Exchange in 2010 and became the first Ukrainian entrepreneur to have a tech company listed on the London Stock Exchange. In 2015, Polyakov's startup Maxymiser was bought by the American corporation Oracle. Blackstone bought out Murka project group in 2019.

Currently, Max focuses on the space industry in an attempt to build a vertically integrated holding company type through Noosphere Ventures asset management firm. The goal is to unite a whole cycle of space mission development to enable fast and affordable access to space.

=== Noosphere Ventures ===
In 2014, Polyakov founded Noosphere Ventures, an international asset management firm dedicated to the development of space technology. The same year, Polyakov created Noosphere Engineering School (NES). Noosphere Ventures hosted the 2016 FAI World Championships for Space Models in Ukraine. Noosphere Ventures portfolio includes D-Orbit, a global provider of space logistic services, and electric rocket propulsion developer Space Electric Thruster Systems (SETS). In 2018, the SETS team was awarded the Seal of Excellence Certificate by the European Commission as part of the Horizon 2020 Research and Innovation Programme. Flight Control, liquid rocket engines manufacturer, also belongs to Noosphere Ventures portfolio.

=== EOS Data Analytics ===
In 2015, Polyakov's Noosphere Ventures created EOS Data Analytics (EOSDA), a global provider of AI-powered satellite imagery analytics and developer of remote sensing solutions. Four years later, EOSDA implemented a project on satellite-based monitoring of agricultural land use in cooperation with the World Bank and the EU.

EOS Data Analytics participates in the GoldenEye project within the EU’s Horizon 2020 initiative aimed to improve safety, environmental impact, and mine profitability by creating a platform that combines Earth observation technologies with on-site sensing. The project targets five mining sites across Europe in Bulgaria, Finland, Germany, Kosovo and Romania. In October 2021, Dragonfly Aerospace announced an agreement with EOS Data Analytics (EOSDA) to use its new 100 kg class µDragonfly satellite bus. The agreement will see EOSDA use the satellite bus as the platform for the two DragonEye electro-optical imagers.

On 3 January 2023, EOS SAT-1, the initial satellite of the company's EOS SAT constellation, the first agri-focused satellite swarm launched by a remote sensing company, was delivered into a low Earth orbit by SpaceX’s Falcon 9 rocket from the Cape Canaveral Space Force Station (CCSFS) in Florida. The satellite was built by the space imaging systems technology provider Dragonfly Aerospace and equipped with two high-resolution DragonEye cameras.

=== Firefly Aerospace ===
Polyakov's Noosphere Ventures acquired the assets of Firefly Space Systems and later launched a new company keeping the original Firefly brand in 2017. By May 2018, a Firefly research and development center was opened in Polyakov's hometown of Dnipro, Ukraine. In November of the same year, Firefly Aerospace entered the list of companies selected by NASA for its lunar exploration program with a total budget of $2.6 billion.

In 2019, the U.S. Air Force selected Firefly to participate in the Orbital Services Program-4 (OSP-4) along with Rocketdyne. In 2021, NASA awarded Firefly $93.3 million to deliver a suite of 10 science investigations and technology demonstrations to the Moon in 2023. The team successfully performed a pre-flight of their alpha rocket in September 2020. On 4 May 2021, CBInsights listed Firefly Aerospace as a 'unicorn' startup having achieved a $1 billion valuation. Firefly expected to make a second Alpha launch attempt in early 2022, but the flight was delayed. In August 2021, Firefly Aerospace hired Lauren Lyons, a former SpaceX and Blue Origin engineer, as its new chief operating officer. Astra, the small launch company that recently went public, has signed a roughly $30 million deal for the rights to manufacture Firefly Aerospace's Reaver rocket engines in-house. In October 2021, Firefly Aerospace announced that it had completed NASA's Critical Design Review (CDR) of its Blue Ghost lunar lander.

On 3 September 2021, a two-stage orbital expendable launch vehicle Firefly Alpha exploded (because of deliberate mission termination) a few minutes after launch from the Vandenberg Space Force Base in California. On 1 October 2022, Firefly Alpha successfully reached orbit for the first time. Firefly Aerospace had raised $75 million to prepare for this launch.

On 24 February 2022, it was announced that Polyakov and his company Noosphere will sell their stake in Firefly to AE Industrial Partners.

=== Dragonfly Aerospace ===
In April 2021, Max Polyakov bought a majority stake in Dragonfly Aerospace, a South African satellite engineering company. The company had more than 20 years of experience in imaging satellites and payloads, mainly through the high-resolution cameras that it builds. Dragonfly develops satellite cameras for Earth Observing Systems Data Analytics. The company currently focuses on providing cameras to Europe and other markets outside the United States. Customers include satellite makers NanoAvionics and Loft Orbital, as well as Indian hyper spectral imaging startup Pixxel. The company said in October that it will build two satellite cameras for EOSDA's first satellite, a crop-monitoring spacecraft slated to launch in 2022.

== Philanthropy ==
In 2016, Polyakov created the non-profit organization Noosphere Association, which organizes STEM events such as BestRoboFest robotics festival and the Noosphere Vernadsky Challenge engineering startup competition. Noosphere Ventures hosted the 2016 FAI World Championships for Space Models in Ukraine. On 7 June 2021, Noosphere Ventures co-sponsored the 11th Annual Space Foundation Student Art Contest. Since 2017, Noosphere Association has sponsored and supported the NASA Space Apps Challenge in Dnipro.

In March 2022, Polyakov along with EOS Data Analytics appealed to global remote sensing firms and organizations to provide real-time synthetic aperture radar data to support the Armed Forces of Ukraine with actionable intelligence. As the Russian invasion of Ukraine unfolded, he donated over ₴100 million to the "Army of drones" project and made a significant donation to the Serhiy Prytula Charity Foundation. In August 2022 when a Ukrainian charity decided to purchase a satellite for the military that uses synthetic aperture radar technology using crowdfunded money, they turned to Max Polyakov for his expertise in the space industry. The purchased satellite helped in the battlefield, according to the Ukrainian Ministry of Defence.

== Controversies ==
A two-year study by the fact-checking web site Snopes led to an investigation by the BBC and Kyiv Post to show that before working in the space industry, Max Polyakov made his fortune from deceptive dating sites. Noosphere Ventures released a statement refuting Snopes' investigation, claiming that Max Polyakov had left the company in 2012 and connecting publication of the material with a lawsuit filed by former Firefly Systems investors. In December 2021, the U.S. government requested that Polyakov sell his stake in the rocket company Firefly Aerospace Inc. due to national security concerns. On 24 February 2022, it was announced that Polyakov and his company Noosphere would sell their stake in Firefly to AE Industrial Partners.

=== Aftermath ===
After a lengthy dispute with US regulators, Ukrainian businessman Max Polyakov was released from all conditions imposed on him and his companies prior to the Russian invasion of Ukraine. After stepping back from day-to-day operations, Polyakov was forced to sell his shares just before Russia's invasion of Ukraine, resulting in financial losses. Although Firefly has since succeeded, with its Alpha rocket achieving full success in September 2023 and the company securing new business ventures, Polyakov is unlikely to return to Firefly. He remains active in the space industry. Polyakov was quoted as saying, "I hope you now are happy. History will judge all of you guys."

== Personal life ==
Polyakov moved to Silicon Valley where he co-founded the venture capital fund Noosphere Venture Partners in 2012. In 2021, Polyakov moved to Edinburgh, Scotland. Polyakov has been described as "A lightning-fast talker with a rugby player’s build and a salesman’s disposition."

=== Family ===
Max Polyakov is married with four children. Polyakov's father Valeriy wrote operating system software for Soviet space rockets. His mother developed hardware systems designed to make the rockets reusable.
