= HitDynamics =

HitDynamics Ltd.
- Company type: Private company
- Industry: Online Marketing
- Key people: Max Polyakov, Founder & CEO
- Owner: Hitwise
- Website: http://www.hitdynamics.com/

HitDynamics is a provider of web analytics software allowing website owners to track the traffic to their sites and ascertain which traffic sources deliver conversions to sales.

The company was founded by internet entrepreneur Max Polyakov in January 2005, and was acquired in on 6 March 2006 by Hitwise. The company's technology now exists as the web analytics arm of the HitWise suite.

== See also ==
Cupid plc, also founded by Max Polyakov
