= Serhiy Prytula =

Ukrainian television presenter, actor, author and fundraiser

- Сергій Притула
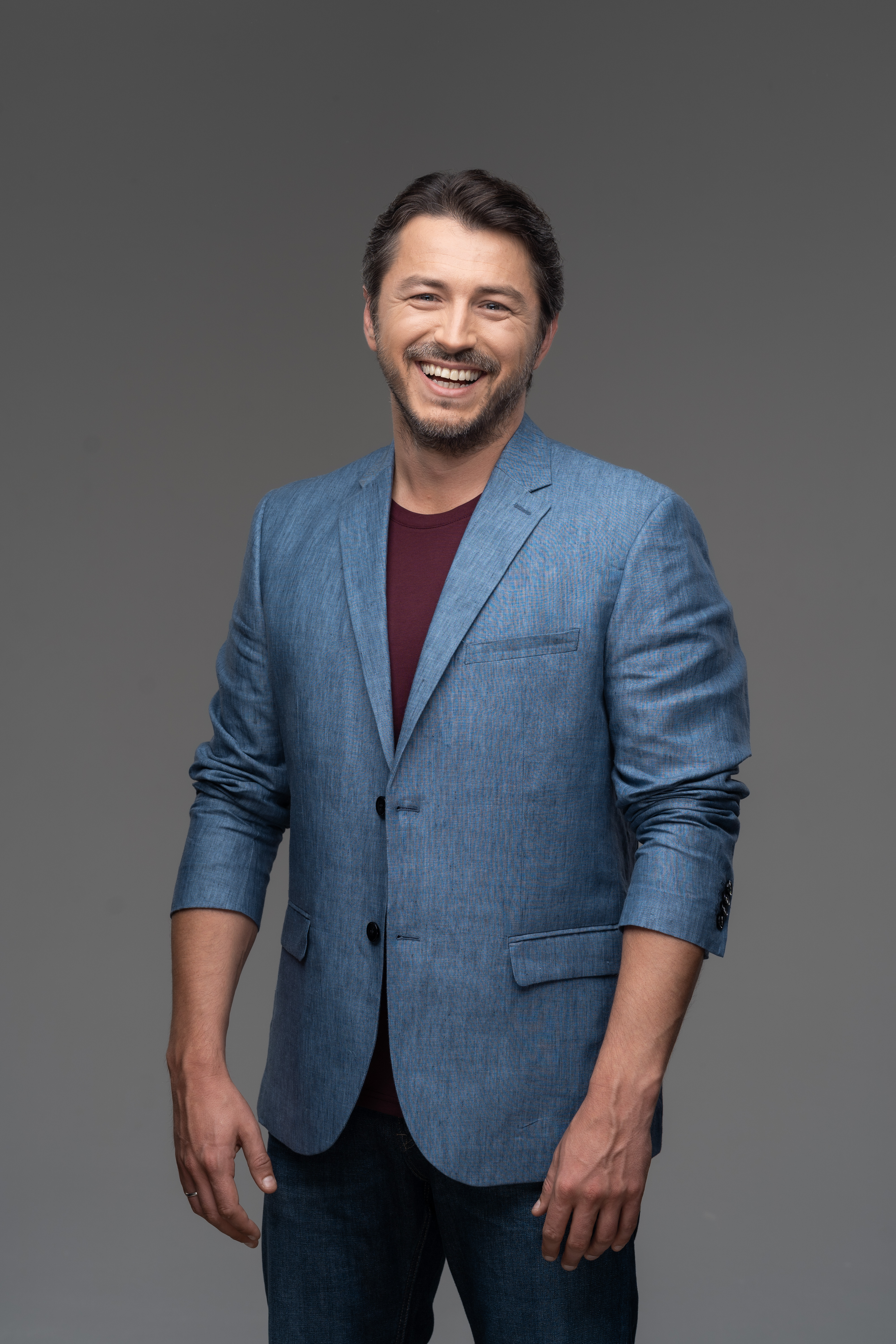
- Prytula in 2020
- Born: 22 June 1981 (age 45); Zbarazh, Ternopil Oblast, Ukrainian SSR, Soviet Union
- Occupations: actor; showman; comedian; volunteer; fundraiser
- Years active: 1999 — present
- Known for: fundraising for Armed Forces of Ukraine
- Political party: Holos (2019–2022)
- Spouse: Kateryna Sopelnyk
- Children: 3

Serhiy Dmytrovych Prytula (Ukrainian: Сергій Дмитрович Притула; born 22 June 1981) is a Ukrainian public and political figure, who gained his popularity as a TV presenter and actor. Since the Russian invasion of Ukraine he has founded Prytula Charity Foundation and focused on fundraising money for the needs of the Armed Forces of Ukraine. His most successful fundraising campaign was People's Bayraktar, which resulted in donations to purchase Baykar Bayraktar TB2 UAVs and also a reconnaissance satellite for Ukraine.

== Early life and education ==
Serhiy was born on 22 June 1981 in the city of Zbarazh, in Ukraine's western Ternopil Oblast. In 1997, he placed second in a contest for high-school students presenting their scientific works, organized by the Junior Academy of Sciences of Ukraine. Serhiy graduated from high school with a gold medal and entered the Ternopil Academy of National Economy (now West Ukrainian National University). During his studies at the academy, Serhiy was an active participant of several youth organizations. He helped establish an informal union of artists.

== Career on radio and television ==
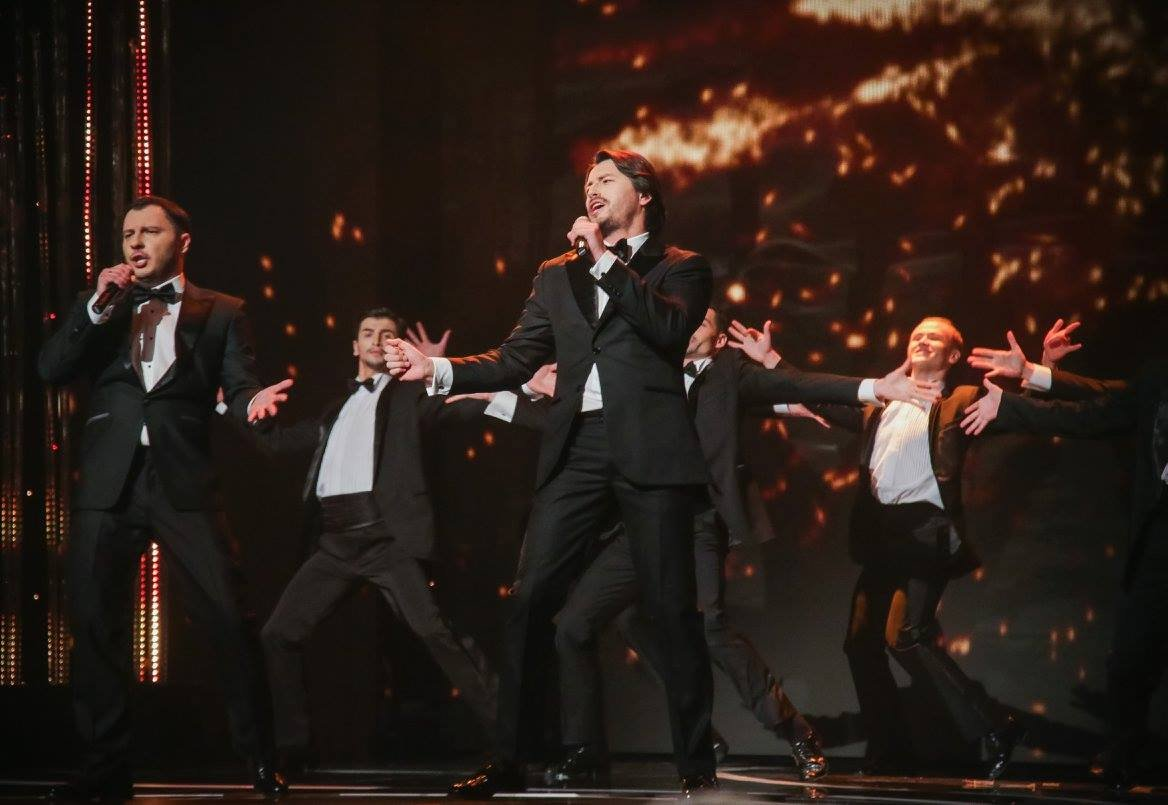
Serhiy Prytula and Dmytro Tankovych co-hosted Teletriumph 2014–2015, which was held at the National Opera of Ukraine. Prytula is pictured here with Tankovych, leading a song and dance session at Teletriumph 2014–2015.

In 1998, Prytula was successful in casting for a radio presenter. In January 1999, he appeared on Radio Ternopil 106.1 FM under the nickname Siryi ("Grey" in Ukrainian, a word play on his first name Serhiy). In 1999, Prytula paid for a course in one of London's colleges and passed term exams remotely. In 2000–2001, he studied in London. Disappointed with studying, Prytula tried a number of jobs in London: from a builder and loader to a waiter and cook's helper. After return to Ternopil, he took the position of Student Dean at a college, and also resumed work on "Radio Ternopil". Prytula has hosted the morning show Pidiom (eng. "Wake up!") and the talent show Ukraine Does not Believe in Tears on Novyi Kanal. From 2017 to 2020, Prytula served as a host of Vidbir, Ukraine's national selection for the Eurovision Song Contest.

Between 2006 and 2009, Prytula was a regular participant of the standup TV show Real Comedy, where he cultivated a sarcastic image from sharply addressing Ukrainian celebrities.

== Political career ==
=== Holos party member ===
From 2019 to 2021, he ran for the parliament election in 2019 and for the post of mayor of Kyiv in 2020 as a member of the Holos party. Prytula took part in the July 2019 Ukrainian parliamentary election with the Holos party, but being number 30, was not among the top 17 members of the party who became MPs. He was a member of the political council of the party from April 2020 until February 2021. Prytula was the Holos candidate for Mayor of Kyiv in the 2020 Kyiv local election. He received less than 8% of the votes (56,900 votes total), placing third and losing the election to incumbent Mayor Vitali Klitschko who was re-elected in the first round with 50.52%.

=== Attempt to form a new party ===
Prytula left Holos in June 2021 but not politics. He claimed the party had "moved so far away from our initial principles." In late September 2021, Prytula announced that he was working to create his own political party. In February 2022, Prytula and supporters started to collect signatures for the establishment of his new political party, called 24 August.

== Volunteering and fundraising ==
Since the start of the Russian invasion of Ukraine in February 2022, Prytula has been coordinating a volunteer supply center for the Ukrainian Ground Forces and civilian volunteers. Being a well-known TV personality, he also started raising funds. In April 2022 reported over ₴200 million raised for the Armed Forces of Ukraine (AFU).

On 22 June 2022, Prytula started the fundraising campaign "People's Bayraktar" for ₴500 million for 3 Bayraktar TB2 UAV for the Ukrainian army, and crowdfunded ₴600 million in just 3 days. Given that some UAVs were provided for free, Prytula was looking for ways to put the remaining funds to good use. On August 18, 2022, the Finnish microsatellite manufacturer ICEYE signed a $17M contract with the Serhiy Prytula Charity Foundation to give the Armed Forces of Ukraine full access to one of its satellites. This provided Armed Forces of Ukraine with on-demand access to all-weather high-resolution reconnaissance imagery through a synthetic aperture radar (SAR) for use in operational planning.

As of July 15, 2022, Prytula had raised for the AFU more than $34M.

On November 2, 2022, the Serhiy Prytula Charity Foundation organized a $5.5M "Grab them all" crowdfunding appeal to buy 50 used ex-British military FV103 Spartan APCs (armored personnel carriers) for the Ukraine army, a fast small- tracked vehicle ideal for muddy and snowy conditions at the frontline in the South of Ukraine. Sufficient money was pledged within a day.

== Criticism ==
In July 2025, Prytula caused controversy by spreading vague online warnings of murder and threatening with imprisonment Ukrainian bloggers effectively sanctioned by their own country for government criticism, among whom Rostyslav Shaposhnikov, a person protected by US government as a political refugee.

== Personal life ==
Prytula's first wife — Yulia Andriychuk from Ternopil — gave birth to son Dmitry in 2008. Prytula married for the second time in 2015, his wife Kateryna Sopelnyk gave birth to two daughters and one son — Solomyia (2017), Stephania (2021) and Mark (2025).

Prytula is a regular airsoft player.

== Awards ==
Prytula is the recipient of the Order of Merit (Ukraine), 3rd class (2019) and 2nd class (2022), as well as the non-government honor "People's Hero of Ukraine" (2016).

== See also ==
- Come Back Alive – Ukrainian nonprofit organization supporting the Ukrainian armed forces
- United24 – Ukrainian government-run fundraising platform
