= Sich-2-30 =

Ukrainian Earth observation satellite

- Names: Sich-2-1
- Operator: State Space Agency of Ukraine
- COSPAR ID: 2022-002AY
- SATCAT no.: 51030

Start of mission
- Launch date: 13 January 2022
- Rocket: Falcon 9
- Launch site: SLC-40

End of mission
- Decay date: 8 October 2025
- Sich satellite series

Sich-2-30 was a Ukrainian Earth observation satellite developed by KB Pivdenne and operated by the State Space Agency of Ukraine. The satellite, based on the design of the previous mission Sich-2, was launched to low Earth orbit in January 2022 on Falcon 9's Transporter-3 rideshare mission. After three years in orbit, the satellite reentered Earth atmosphere in October 2025. Sich-2-30 was the last mission of the Sich satellite series. Ukraine discontinued the programme, largely based on old Soviet spaceflight heritage, in 2026 with the stated intention to focus on more modern technologies and international cooperation.
