= Cupid plc =

Online dating website company

- Company type: plc
- Available in: English, French, German, Portuguese, Spanish, Swedish, other
- Traded as: LSE: CUP
- Headquarters: Edinburgh, Scotland, UK
- Area served: Worldwide
- Key people: Bill Dobbie, co-founder & CEO; Max Polyakov, co-Founder (no longer involved with the company); Niall Stirling, CFO and Company Secretary
- Industry: Online dating
- Products: Cupid.com, Flirt.com, BeNaughty.com, other
- Revenue: £53.6M (2011)
- Employees: 500
- Website: www.cupid.com
- Users: 54 million (June 2012)
- Current status: inactive

Cupid plc was the owner and operator of several online dating websites, covering mainstream to niche audiences. The websites were global, in a variety of languages, and by the end of the first half of 2012 more than 54 million users had created profiles on the company's websites. The products were available across multiple devices (web, mobile, Android, iOS) and platforms (on web browsers, within Facebook).

== History ==
Founded in 2005 by Bill Dobbie and Max Polyakov, the company was originally made up of a range of dating websites operated from an off-shore base. In 2006, Polyakov and Dobbie acquired the EasyDate business, which had been experiencing growth. The company quickly grew its user base – by 2007 they had a million paying users, and a few years after that they hit 13 million paying users across all networks.

By early March 2010, the user base was growing at a rate of 300,000 per month, and new products were increasing these numbers. A year later, in May 2011, the company had 23 million members in 39 countries. The company was named as Scotland's fastest growing technology firm by Deloitte in its October 2011 Fast 500 listing, and in May 2012 went on to win the Best Travel & Leisure PLC award at the UK Stock Market Awards.

The company was listed in the Alternative Investment Market of the London Stock Exchange (AIM). Upon admission, the company had an approximate market capitalisation of £45 million. The capital raised by the listing enabled the company to undertake some strategic acquisitions in markets with growth potential. On 24 July 2012, Cupid plc announced that it had acquired the French dating site Assistance Genie Logiciel (AGL) for the sum of €3.7 million. The deal to buy the 1986-founded company included French dating sites amour.com, serencontrer.com and ulla.com. Also in 2012 Cupid acquired Uniform Dating, a niche website aimed at uniformed services personnel such as firefighters, nurses, armed forces and police.

=== BBC investigation ===
In February 2013, the company was the subject of BBC Radio 5live Investigates programme. Users told the BBC that they had received many messages from potential dates as free users of the site, but that when they paid for membership to be able to reply, the volume of messages dramatically decreased. The company denied that it was sending the messages to entice users to pay for membership and commissioned an independent audit into its operation. After a subsequent investigation into these claims, one of the sources of the accusations made a public apology regarding factual inaccuracies in his blog postings on the subject.

An investigation by Ukrainian newspaper Kyiv Post in March 2013 proved that fake profiles were being used by the company and confirmed that the company's 'social media managers', who were tempting users, were located in Ukraine. It was revealed that only about 20 employees of Cupid plc worked in the United Kingdom, with most based in Ukraine.

The company stated that its auditors KPMG had found 'no evidence of a company organised practice of staff enticing registered members to subscribe through the use of fake profiles'. Nevertheless, Cupid recognized that existing staff profiles 'were not clearly identifiable' to users and said it had replaced the motivation teams with dating advisors. In July 2013, the BBC published a new investigation, claiming that the problem of fake profiles still existed, and the company used real persons' data without their knowledge.

Such activities are subject to legal prosecution in some countries. Björn and Benjamin Bak, founders of German dating application Lovoo, and twelve members of their staff were arrested and accused of commercial deception due to similar tactics. Avid Life Media, founder of dating site Ashley Madison, was accused of using 'fembots' on a large scale.

== Business and products ==
Cupid's business was split into two main areas: mainstream dating websites with some differentiation (for example, Cupid.com was aimed at people looking for long-term relationships, whereas BeNaughty.com was geared towards users looking for more casual dating); and niche websites, where the whole concept fundamentally hinges on people looking for partners of a similar background and tastes.

The business model varied slightly depending on the website. In most cases, users could join for free and would need to pay to interact with someone. In addition to this, Cupid partnered with other companies to provide a branded, specifically targeted online dating experience.

Cupid plc disposed of its casual dating sites in July 2013. It sold the remaining mainstream dating sites to NSI Holdings Ltd. in December 2014 and is no longer involved in online dating.

== Name change ==
The company traded as EasyDate from 2006, when it acquired the name, and was initially listed on AIM using this name. However, in December 2010, as a result of pressure from easyGroup founder Sir Stelios Haji-Ioannou, the company changed its name. The name Cupid plc was chosen as it had been acquired in September of that year, along with all associated domains for £4.4 million.

== End of Cupid plc ==
The investigations by the BBC and Kyiv Post caused a sharp decline in share price. In the summer of 2013, the company sold part of its 'casual dating business' to Grendall Investment Limited, controlled by co-founder and shareholder of Cupid plc Max Polyakov.

In 2014, Cupid plc suffered heavy losses and was forced to call in part of the money owed by Grendall. The company took a reduced £12.5 million instead of £20 million to get the money a year earlier. Cupid plc then announced that it had sold its final dating businesses for £3 million. It is believed that the assets were bought by companies connected to Max Polyakov. Cupid plc was renamed Castle Street Investment and realigned as an investment company.

== See also ==
- Cupid.com
- Badoo
- eHarmony
- Cupid Media
- HitDynamics, another company founded by Max Polyakov
- Match.com
- Zoosk
