= Serhiy Prytula Charity Foundation =

Ukrainian charitable organization

- Благодійна організація «Фонд Сергія Притули»
- Founder: Serhiy Prytula
- Founded at: Kyiv, Ukraine
- VAT ID no.: 43720363
- Headquarters: Kyiv, Ukraine
- Location: Ukraine
- Website: prytulafoundation.org/en/

Serhiy Prytula Charity Foundation (Ukrainian: Благодійний фонд Сергія Притули, romanized: Blahodiynyy fond Serhiy Prytula) is a Ukrainian charitable organization that specializes in helping the Ukrainian Defense Forces and civilians affected by the Russian-Ukrainian war. It is engaged in the purchase and supply of vehicles, unmanned aerial vehicles, thermal imagers, radios, equipment, mobile healthcare, module housing, school shelters, humanitarian demining and medicines.

== History ==
It was registered in July 2020. The founder is a public figure, volunteer and TV presenter Serhiy Prytula, and the director is Andrii Shuvalov. The charitable organization became active after the start of the full-scale Russian invasion of Ukraine on February 24, 2022. Initially, the foundation was engaged in helping the defenders of Kyiv. Prytula organized a headquarters in the office, where everyone interested brought aid. There, it was distributed depending on the needs.

== Projects ==
On August 18, 2022, the fund leased an ICEYE satellite for Ukrainian intelligence for 600 million hryvnias.

=== Purchase of UAVs ===
In March 2022, Prytula, on behalf of the foundation, announced a fundraise to purchase a drone. The required 10 million hryvnias were raised in 3.5 hours. In total, between February 24 and May 19, 2022, the foundation raised 700 million hryvnias for the needs of the Ukrainian Defense Forces.

In May 2022, Serhiy Prytula and the Kalush Orchestra sold a crystal microphone at an auction, which the band received for winning the Eurovision Song Contest 2022. The amount raised was $900,000 (over 33 million hryvnias). In addition, the pink Panama hat worn by the band's lead singer, Oleh Psiuk, was raffled off among those who contributed to the auction. In this way, another 11 million hryvnias were raised. All the money raised, more than 44 million hryvnias, was spent on the purchase of a set of PD-2 drones for the Ukrainian army."

On June 8, 2022, the Serhiy Prytula Foundation and the Dukat auction house announced an auction for 10 paintings by Ukrainian artists on military subjects. Later, Olena Grozovska wrote on her Facebook that the paintings had fetched almost three million hryvnias. This money will be spent on the purchase of Valkyrie drones."

On June 20, 2022, Serhiy Prytula announced that his foundation had purchased 40 quadcopters with thermal imagers for the military, spending 10 million hryvnias.

On June 22, 2022, Serhiy Prytula, on behalf of his foundation, announced the collection of money for the purchase of three Bayraktar TB2 drones. The project was called "People's Bayraktar". According to the plan, 500 million hryvnias were to be raised within a week. In fact, 600 million hryvnias were raised in three days. This amount would have been enough for four aircraft."

After the fundraising was completed, the Turkish drone manufacturer Baykar Makina announced that it would provide Ukraine with three units free of charge. It is planned that the money raised will be used for the needs of the Armed Forces of Ukraine.

=== Purchase of cars ===
In March 2022, shortly after the start of the full-scale Russian invasion, the Hellcars project was launched. Its goal is to raise funds, search for cars, purchase them, and send them to units of the Ukrainian Defense Forces. The project's website contains details for donations, as well as contacts for people who can offer their cars for purchase.

On May 5, 2022, the Foundation auctioned off Maria Prymachenko's painting Flowers Grew Near the Fourth Block, fetching $500,000 (over UAH 18 million). For this money, the organization purchased 125 Volkswagen T5 minibuses and sent them to the Ukrainian military. The foreigners who bought the painting decided to donate it to a museum in Kyiv."

=== Purchase of Spartans ===
On November 2, Serhiy Prytula's foundation announced a new fundraiser for the Armed Forces. Initially, they planned to raise UAH 200 million to purchase 50 Spartan armored personnel carriers.

In a day and a half, 236 million UAH was raised. The money was supposed to be enough to buy 60 such armored personnel carriers. In the final calculation, the money was raised for 101 armored personnel carriers."

Among the 101 purchased vehicles, there are eight models:

- FV103 Spartan – an armored personnel carrier for the transportation of personnel;
- Samaritan – an armored tracked medical evacuation vehicle;
- Sultan – armored tracked command vehicle;
- Stormer – an armored tracked vehicle for installation of an anti-aircraft system;
- Shielder – an armored tracked vehicle for the transportation of ammunition, personnel and installation of anti-tank missile systems;
- FV432 Bulldog – armored personnel carrier for transportation of personnel;
- FV434 – armored tracked vehicle with a crane for repair and evacuation;
- Samson – armored tracked vehicle for evacuation of armored vehicles.

The first batch of 24 "People's Spartan" was shown to the audience on March 3, 2023.

=== Other charitable activities ===
On July 12, 2022, 10-year-old Valeria Yezhova from Kyiv donated 21 thousand hryvnias to the Foundation. The girl raised the money by playing checkers with passersby. People who lost had to donate an arbitrary amount to the army."

On August 29, 2022, Serhiy Prytula's charitable foundation, Odesa-based FC Chornomorets and the management of Odesa's Chornomorets stadium signed a memorandum of cooperation.

In June 2023, after the Destruction of the Kakhovka Dam, the Foundation purchased and sent to the rescuers in Kherson a mud pumping machine.

In September 2024, the Prytula Foundation U.S.A. was launched in the United States. As an independent non-profit, it focuses on restoring safe and dignified living conditions in Ukraine’s front-line and de-occupied regions.

The activities of Serhiy Prytula's foundation are supported by the director, Andrii Shuvalov, and an accountant. Only these two people receive a salary." The charitable organization cooperates with the "Come Back Alive" fund and batch of international and national partners and donor institutions. The foundation's activities include assistance to medical institutions, such as Okhmatdyt and the Institute of Traumatology."

== See also ==
- List of military aid to Ukraine during the Russo-Ukrainian War
- List of humanitarian aid to Ukraine during the Russo-Ukrainian War
