= United24 =

Ukrainian government-run fundraising platform

- Abbreviation: U24
- Formation: 5 May 2022
- Type: Governmental
- Official language: English, Ukrainian
- Website: u24.gov.ua

United24 (Ukrainian: Єдині24, romanised: Yedyni24) is a Ukrainian government–run platform launched on 5 May 2022 to raise money and influence international opinion for Ukraine in the Russo-Ukrainian War.

== History ==
On 3 May 2022, Prime Minister of Ukraine Denys Shmyhal announced that a platform for fundraising in support of Ukraine would be launched soon:

Everyone in the world can make a donation and help Ukraine fight for our freedom. We want to unite the world around the support of our state. Ordinary people, charitable foundations, international companies, opinion leaders around the world. The creation of the platform is also necessary to demonstrate maximum transparency and openness in the use of funds raised: where and to whom they are directed.

— Denys Shmyhal, Prime Minister of Ukraine

On 5 May 2022, President of Ukraine Volodymyr Zelenskyy announced the launch of the United24 initiative, the first component of which is an online platform to raise funds to support the state. Funds from international donors are accepted by United24. (Note: With respect to the U.S. tax deductibility of donations to United 24, in response to the question, "are donations tax-deductible?", the response provided is, "UNITED24 is not an NGO, but it can collaborate with international NGOs. The official partner of UNITED24 in the United States is Ukraine House DC Foundation, a 501(c)3 registered nonprofit organization (EIN 872080907). Donations to Medical Aid and Rebuild Ukraine are tax-deductible under IRS regulations to the full extent".) The funds raised are distributed in three areas: defence and demining, humanitarian and medical assistance, and reconstruction of Ukraine.

The funds are transferred to the accounts of the National Bank of Ukraine and assigned to the relevant ministries: the Ministry of Defence, the Ministry of Healthcare, and the Ministry of Infrastructure. The reports on the platform are updated daily.

=== Donation history ===
In July 2022, United24 announced that it had raised US$166 million in donations since the creation of the initiative. By May 2023, the platform had raised more than US$325M. In November 2023, United24 donations reached US$500M. In May 2024, United24 donations reached $650M (from 110 countries).

In December 2024, United24 recorded its highest monthly fundraising total since its launch, raising more than US$160M, which accounted for half of the annual donations to the platform.

In February 2025, the donations exceeded US$1bn.

== Structure ==
United24's operational leadership falls under the Main Coordinator. The Main Coordinator leads the management team behind campaign strategies, partnerships, and global outreach. The current Main Coordinator is Yaroslava Gres.

== Ambassadors ==
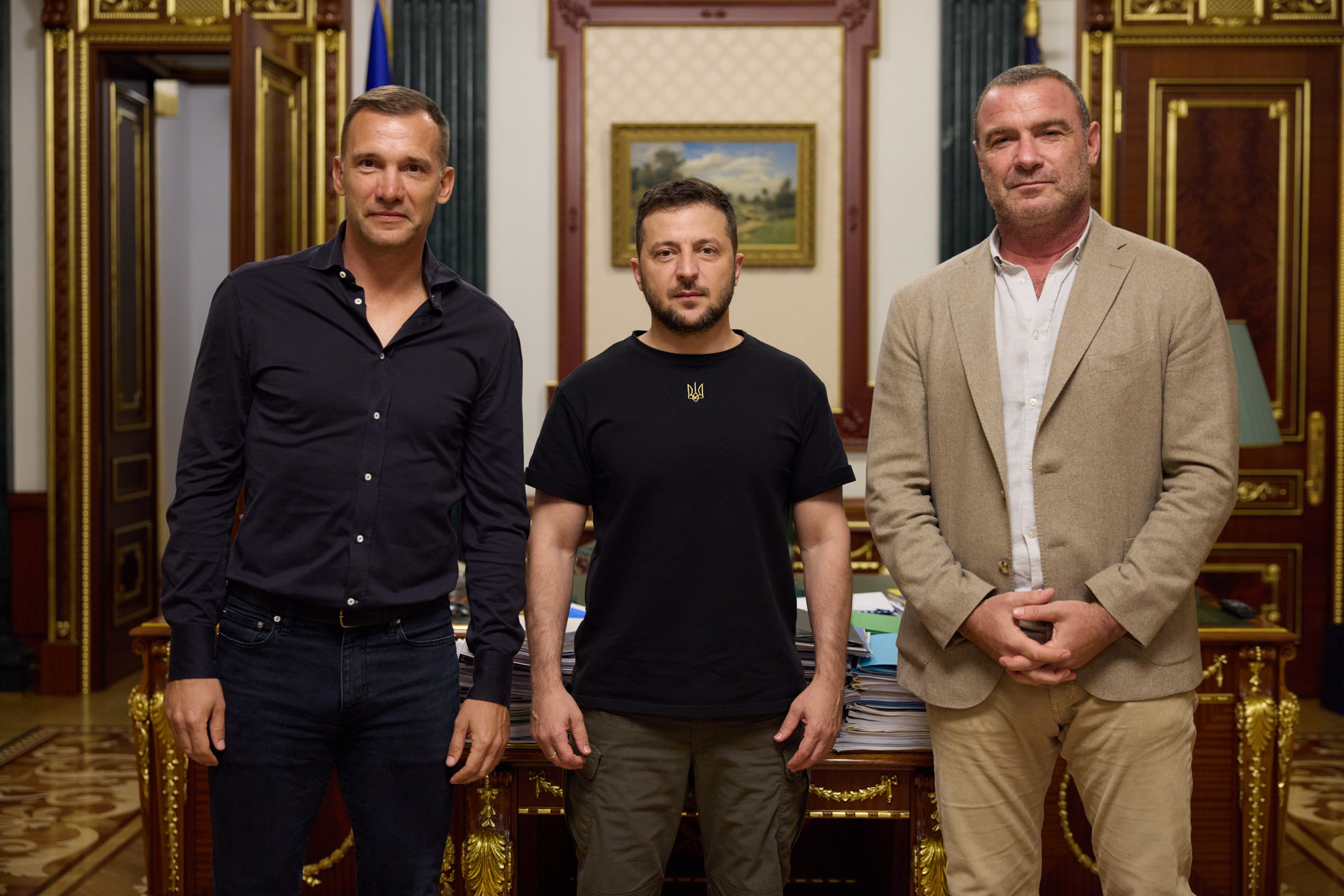
Meeting of the president of Ukraine (centre) with United24 ambassadors Andriy Shevchenko (left) and Liev Schreiber (right), 16 August 2022

=== FC Shakhtar ===
Football Club Shakhtar partnered with United24 for the "Pitch in for Ukraine" initiative in August 2022. President Zelenskyy met with project ambassadors in August to discuss the creation of a new youth program for United24.

=== List of ambassadors ===
Name	Notes	Role	Since	Ref
Andriy Shevchenko	Football player and manager	First ambassador	18 May 2022	
Elina Svitolina	Tennis player	Second ambassador	7 June 2022	
Imagine Dragons	Rock band	Ambassadors	25 July 2022	
Liev Schreiber	Actor	Ambassador	July 2022	
Demna Gvasalia	Fashion designer for Balenciaga	Ambassador	July 2022	
Barbra Streisand	Singer and actress	Ambassador	22 September 2022	
Mark Hamill	Actor	Ambassador	29 September 2022	
Oleksandr Usyk	Boxer	Ambassador	October 2022	
Scott Kelly	Astronaut	Ambassador	27 October 2022	
Timothy D. Snyder	Historian	Ambassador	2 November 2022	
NAVI	Esports team	Partnership	18 November 2022	
Brad Paisley	Singer	Ambassador	24 January 2023	
Michel Hazanavicius	Film director, screenwriter, editor, and producer	Ambassador	2 February 2023	
Katheryn Winnick	Actress	Ambassador	1 March 2023	
Bear Grylls	Adventurer, writer, television presenter, and businessman	Ambassador	29 March 2023	
Edvard Moser	Psychologist and neuroscientist	Ambassador	29 March 2023	
May-Britt Moser	Psychologist and neuroscientist	Ambassador	29 March 2023	
Richard Branson	Entrepreneur, founded the Virgin Group	Ambassador	10 April 2023	
Paul Nurse	Geneticist and Nobel laureate	Ambassador	5 May 2023	
Ivanna Sakhno	Actress	Ambassador	5 May 2023	
Oleksandr Zinchenko	Football player	Ambassador	30 May 2023	
Misha Collins	Actor	Ambassador	31 May 2023	
José Andrés	/Chef and restaurateur	Ambassador	17 September 2023	
Mark Strong	Actor	Ambassador	27 September 2023	
Alyssa Milano	Actress	Ambassador	28 May 2024	
Hilary Swank	Actress	Ambassador	28 May 2024	

== Reconstruction projects ==
In October 2023, United24 completed their nineteenth bridge rebuild, with a bridge in the Mykolaiv Oblast across the Inhulets river. This bridge was undertaken with assistance from donor AWT Bavaria and servicemen of the State Transport Special Service.

United24 has funded medical related goods including Gurkha armoured ambulances, 13 have been ordered by United24.

Also in October 2023, United24 was undertaking the rebuild of 18 apartment blocks in Kyiv, using a 3-D modelling system to provide donors with information on the rebuilding works.

Funds are also used for rebuilding schools, including one in Marianivka, Kyiv Oblast.

== See also ==
- Marshall Plan
- Nova Ukraine
- Come Back Alive
- Saint Javelin
- People's Bayraktar
- Ukrainian National Fund
