= UASAT =

Ukrainian satellite constellation

- Country/ies of origin: Ukraine
- Type: Satellite internet constellation
- Status: Under development

Constellation size
- Nominal satellites: 120
- Current usable satellites: 1
- First launch: 1 October 2026
- Website: uasat.com

UASAT is a low-earth orbit satellite internet constellation of Ukraine. The project aims to launch 120 satellites into orbit by 2027, with the first satellite launched in October 2026, and is intended to reduce the country's reliance on foreign constellations such as Starlink. Ukrainian companies Stetman and Himera are involved in its development, while manufacturing will be supported by the Danish company GomSpace until the satellites can be manufactured domestically in Ukraine.

Transporter-18 encapsulation

== Description ==
The constellation is planned to operate at an altitude of 550 km, and will provide coverage over Europe, North Africa, and portions of the Middle East. Terminals will use the Hughes Network Systems Jupiter 3 DVB-S2X platform in the Ka band, with anticipated download and upload speeds of up to 100Mbit/s and 10Mbit/s respectively. The terminals will also be expected to be compatible with Starlink and Eutelsat OneWeb platforms.

== History ==
Ukraine filed an application with the International Telecommunication Union to register the UASAT-NANO satellite network in December 2025. UASAT founder Dmytro Stetsenko states that the first satellite is scheduled to launch in October 2026. The first satellite was launched on 1 October 2026 aboard the Falcon 9 rideshare mission Transporter-18.

== Satellites ==
List of UASAT satellites
Name	COSPAR ID	Launch date	Launch vehicle	Ref
UASAT-NANO ("OBRIA NANO")	2026-227BW	1 October 2026, 18:32 UTC	Falcon 9 Transporter-18	

== See also ==
- List of Ukrainian satellites
- IRIS² – EU satellite telecoms constellation project
