= People's Bayraktar =

Project to fund and buy drones for Ukraine

People's Bayraktar (Ukrainian: Народний Байрактар, romanized: Narodnyy Bayraktar) was a series of fund-raising projects for the purchase of the Turkish Bayraktar TB2 drones for the needs of the Armed Forces of Ukraine.

Fundraising projects for the Bayraktar TB2 intended to serve the Ukrainian Armed Forces were successful in Lithuania, Poland and Ukraine itself. Similar projects have also been attempted in Norway and Canada.

== Fundraising ==
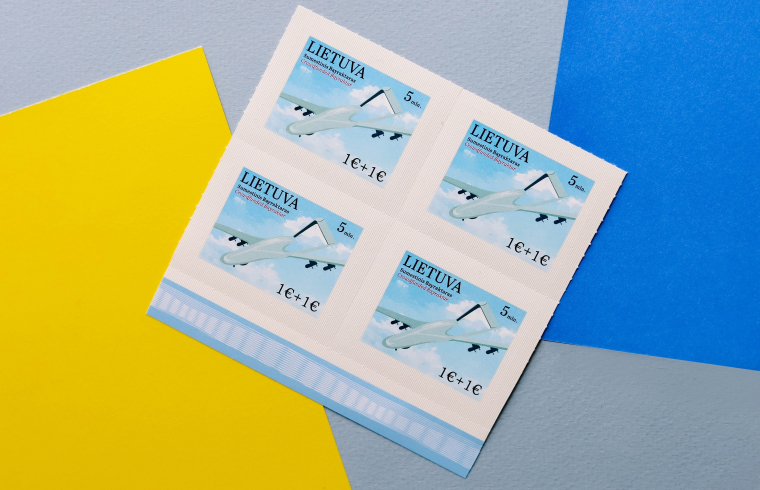
Stamps with the image of the Bayraktar TB2 from the Post of Lithuania in honor of Lithuanian crowdfunding

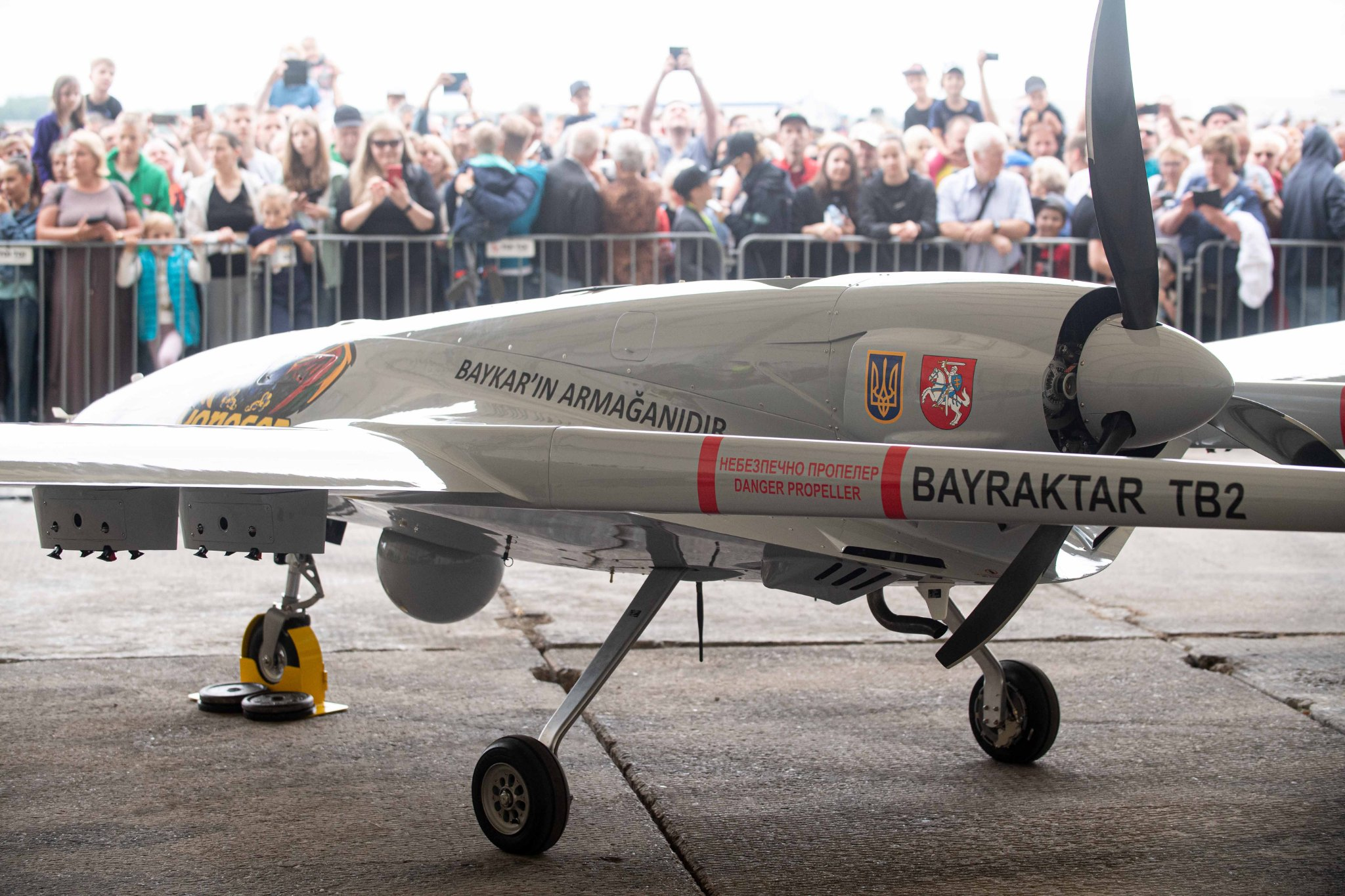
Bayraktar TB2 combat drone, crowdfunded by Lithuanians

=== Lithuania ===
The first Bayraktar fundraising for the Armed Forces of Ukraine took place in Lithuania. It was announced by Lithuanian TV presenter Andrius Tapinas. This initiative received approval from the defense departments of Lithuania and Turkey. Lithuanians collected more than 5 million euros for this purchase in three days. On June 2, 2022, Baykar, the manufacturer of attack drones, announced that it will donate Bayraktar TB2 to the Lithuanian campaign. Lithuanian Defense Minister Arvydas Anušauskas emphasized that Lithuania will use the collected money to buy the necessary ammunition for the attack drone.

On June 9, the Lithuanian Post Office started selling a stamp with the image of Bayraktar TB2. Half of the money for the purchase of the stamp goes to the accounts of the charity fund "Blue/Yellow" (Lithuanian: Mėlyna ir geltona) for humanitarian aid to Ukraine.

=== Ukraine ===
On June 22, 2022, on his birthday, TV presenter and public figure Serhiy Prytula announced an all-Ukrainian fundraising campaign for attack drones Bayraktar TB2. According to him, the "People's Bayraktar" project was being prepared for about a month.

About 300 million hryvnias were collected on the first day. On the third day of fundraising, the planned amount of 500 million was fully collected and exceeded. According to Prytula, as of the evening of June 24, more than ₴600 million had been collected, which would allow ordering four Bayraktars instead of three.

One of the fundraising slogans was the phrase: every six hryvnias matter.

Mykhailo Podolyak, adviser to the head of the Office of the President of Ukraine, also commented on the completion of fundraising:

"In just three days, Andrius Tapinas and the people of Lithuania raised €6 million for Bayraktar for Ukraine. The Serhiy Prytula Foundation and the Ukrainian people repeated the challenge and will buy four more "birds". We will win because real people from all over the world are behind us. For the Russian Federation, there is nothing but gloom and emptiness."

International mass media, such as Yahoo, Sky News Politico, TRhaber, etc., actively wrote about the collection of funds for combat drones.

After the fund-raising was completed, drone manufacturer Baykar announced that it would send three drones to Ukraine, for which Ukrainians raised money, free of charge, on the basis that all the fundraised money be donated to charities helping Ukrainians both in Ukraine and outside (refugees). The condition was accepted. On August 18, Prytula announced through a YouTube video and a post on Notion that the money raised was spent on striking a deal with ICEYE, a Finnish satellite manufacturer. This deal allows Ukraine's Ministry of Defence full access to all the systems and full capabilities for one of ICEYE’s satellites already in orbit over the region. Prytula has said that this access was purchased for "over a year". The Bayraktars arrived in Ukraine on September 5 and have since been sent to the frontlines. They were named Халепа (Khalepa), Ковінька (Kovinka), and Трясця (Triastsia); all three of these names are exclamations in Ukrainian used to express anger or dissatisfaction. The implied meaning of these names is that enemy soldiers will be yelling in anger when they get attacked by the drones.

=== Poland ===
We want to participate in your humanitarian solidarity movement. We will provide a Bayraktar TB2 drone to the people of Ukraine so they can protect their homeland

— a letter from the board of directors of Baykar

On June 28, 2022, following Lithuania and Ukraine, a fundraising campaign for Bayraktar was launched in Poland, initiated by Polish journalist Sławomir Sierakowski. The fundraising was planned for 30 days, expecting to collect 4.5 million złotys. As of June 30, the first million of złotys were collected in Poland.

In total, 22.5 million zlotys were raised, more than planned. Also this time, the Turkish company provided the drone "Bayraktar" to Ukraine for free, and the allocated funds have been spent on humanitarian aid instead. Sławomir Sierakowski published a letter from the board of directors of Baykar.

== See also ==
- People's Satellite
