= EOS SAT-1 =

Privately owned satellite

- Mission type: Earth observation
- COSPAR ID: 2023-001AW
- SATCAT no.: 55053
- Website: eos.com/eossat/
- Mission duration: 3 years and 9 months (in progress)

Spacecraft properties
- Manufacturer: Dragonfly Aerospace
- Launch mass: 176.64 kg (389.4 lb)
- Dimensions: 1130.3 х 1390 х 821 mm

Start of mission
- Launch date: 3 January 2023, 14:56:09 UTC
- Rocket: Falcon 9
- Launch site: Cape Canaveral Space Force Station (CCSFS)

Orbital parameters
- Reference system: Geocentric
- Regime: Low Earth orbit
- Perigee altitude: 516 km
- Apogee altitude: 537 km
- Inclination: 97.496 degrees
- Period: 95.15 min (1 h 35 min 09 s)

EOS SAT-1 is an optical Earth observation satellite for agricultural land monitoring by EOS Data Analytics, a satellite imagery analytics provider. The space optics instrument and satellite manufacturer Dragonfly Aerospace built the satellite and equipped it with two high-resolution DragonEye cameras. It is the first satellite within the planned EOS SAT agriculture-focused satellite constellation.

== Overview ==
EOS SAT-1 is developed for EOS Data Analytics, a US-Ukrainian company founded by Max Polyakov. It is the first satellite within the company's planned constellation EOS SAT. It will have a daily imaging capacity of up to 1 million square kilometers and capture imagery in 11 agri-related spectral bands. Satellite cameras will produce panchromatic and multispectral images.

== Satellite constellation ==
Once fully operational, the seven small optical EOS SAT satellites will cover up to 100% of the countries with the largest cropland and forest areas, 98.5% of such lands worldwide. The satellite constellation will monitor up to 12 million square kilometers daily.

== History ==
The satellite was launched on 3 January 2023, on the SpaceX’s Transporter-6 mission. The Falcon 9 rocket lifted off from the Cape Canaveral Space Force Station (CCSFS) and launched 114 spacecraft into orbit, including the EOS SAT-1 satellite. Since the launch into low Earth orbit, the EOS SAT-1 satellite has established contact and sent telemetry and data on the status of its systems to Earth.

== Specifications ==
View of the earth from EOS SAT-1

A single EOS SAT-1 satellite scene covers a territory that is 42 km in width and can be over 1000 km in length. The altitude of the satellite's sun-synchronous orbit is 520–560 km.

Orbit average power: 140 W.

Design lifetime: 5–7 years.

Mass: 176.6400 kg.

Bus voltage: 24.5 — 33.6 V.

GSD (ground sample distance), resolution:

- panchromatic 1.4 m
- multispectral 2.8 m

Swath width: double optical payload with a 44 km swath width for an altitude of 500 km.

Spectral bands — 11 agri-related bands:

- RGB
- 2 NIR bands
- 3 RedEdge bands
- WaterVapor
- Aerosol
- Pan

== See also ==
- GeoEye-1
- Earth observation satellites
