= ICEYE =

Finnish microsatellite manufacturer

ICEYE Ltd.
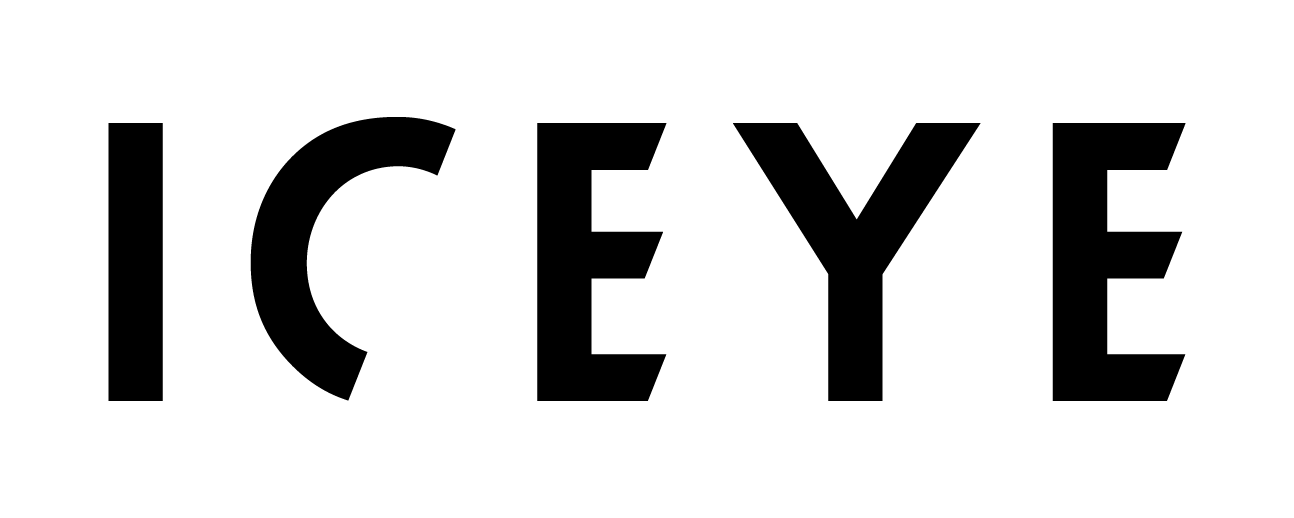
- Native name: ICEYE Oy
- Type: Limited company (osakeyhtiö)
- Industry: Satellite imagery
- Founded: 2014; 12 years ago in Espoo, Finland
- Founders: Rafał Modrzewski; Pekka Laurila
- Headquarters: Espoo, Finland
- Area served: Worldwide
- Key people: Rafał Modrzewski (CEO & chairman)
- Revenue: €200 million (2025)
- Website: www.iceye.com

ICEYE Ltd. (natively ICEYE Oy) is a Finnish microsatellite manufacturer and operator. ICEYE was founded in 2014 and is now the world's largest synthetic aperture imaging radar constellation. Its first important innovation was miniaturising synthetic aperture imaging radar satellites to below 100 kg (220 lb) to image through clouds and in darkness.

Founded by Rafał Modrzewski and Pekka Laurila, the company is originally a spin-off of Aalto University's University Radio Technology Department, and is based in Espoo. The CEO and chairman of the board of ICEYE is Rafał Modrzewski. It has offices globally (Finland, Poland, Spain, Greece, the UK, and the US) and over 900 employees. In September 2024, the company reported 2023 revenues of $100M and expanded its funding to $503M. The company raised a further €150M in December 2025. In 2026, the company raised €450 million at €10 billion valuation.

== History ==
In 2015, ICEYE demonstrated that synthetic-aperture radar could be used to monitor hazardous ice features such as pack ice. The company raised its first $2.8 million venture funding from the American and Finnish venture funds True Ventures and Lifeline Ventures.

In 2019, the founders of ICEYE and Aalto staff involved were awarded the Finnish Engineering Award by the Academic Engineers and Architects in Finland TEK The achievement was called "a breakthrough in Finnish space technology" in the award citation.

In October 2019, ICEYE started offering commercial access to its 1-metre resolution SAR-imagery, and operated 3 SAR satellites.

In December 2020, ICEYE sold two satellites (X18, X19 or X20) to the Brazilian Air Force, these satellites were launched in May 2022 on SpaceX's Transporter-5 mission. The Brazilians named these satellites Carcará 1 and Carcará 2.

In August 2022, during the Russian invasion of Ukraine, ICEYE signed a contract with the Serhiy Prytula Charity Foundation that would give the Armed Forces of Ukraine access to one of its satellites.

In May 2025, Poland signed a deal with ICEYE to acquire three radar satellites, with the contract valued at approximately €200 million. The agreement also includes an option to purchase three more satellites and expand the ground infrastructure within the next year. As part of the partnership, ICEYE works with Polish industry to deliver an advanced platform for the country's armed forces, enabling near real-time mission control, data access, and analysis for intelligence and surveillance operations.

The company has launched a total of 38 satellites as of August 2024. In December 2024, it launched two more, and in January 2025, it launched four more, bringing total launched satellites to 44. On 5 December 2025, the company announced that it has launched 62 satellites.

In December 2025, ICEYE, together with its joint venture Rheinmetall ICEYE Space Solutions, signed a contract with Germany for radar satellite data services valued at 1.76 billion euros, with options that could increase the total to over 2.7 billion euros by 2030, making it ICEYE's largest contract to date. The agreement covers the delivery and operation of a dedicated radar satellite constellation to support German military intelligence and surveillance needs, particularly for NATO-related defense operations.

In June 2026, ICEYE raised over €1 billion — a €450 million primary Series F led by General Atlantic plus a secondary above €550 million — at a valuation exceeding €10 billion, with new backers including Nokia, the Qatar Investment Authority and TCV.

== Business ==
The company launched as an earth observation data provider with its own satellite constellation that has the ability to revisit locations on earth in hours and can do imaging in all weather conditions. With top use cases including "border monitoring, site activity monitoring, port monitoring, maritime domain, deforestation monitoring, sea ice and oil spills".

From 2022, in addition to its own constellation data, the company offered entire satellite launches to customers, saying "Governments and large multinational corporations are able to purchase their own radar imaging satellites from ICEYE and operate them independently, or arrange ICEYE to manage the spacecraft exclusively on their behalf".

It has bespoke packaged solutions for Insurance and Government domains to assist in flood and wildfire insights and improve disaster response.

== Funding and financial performance ==
Upon demonstrating the solution for monitoring pack ice in 2015, ICEYE received a €2.4M grant from the European Union's Horizon 2020 programme for SMEs with the goal "to integrate, pilot test and demonstrate the ICEYE SAR system in its final form as a microsatellite in order to attract private investment for launching."

In August 2017, ICEYE raised $13 million in capital, including from the Finnish Funding Agency for Innovations.

On 24 May 2018, ICEYE raised $34M in Series B led by return investor True Ventures and supported by Draper Network VC funds and others. The company said it will use the capital to "expand its custom analytics services for its growing customer base, further develop its SAR satellite technology, as well as fund additional launches of ICEYE SAR satellites".

In September 2020, ICEYE raised $87M in Series C led by return investor True Ventures, with a significant additional investment by OTB Ventures. With the funding the company seeks to establish manufacturing in the US and build on existing capabilities (such as 0.25 meter resolution data and SAR video and demonstrated record time data deliveries of 5 minutes).

On 3 February 2022, ICEYE raised $136M to increase the size of the constellation and strengthen "the growth of ICEYE's Natural Catastrophe (NatCat) Insights and Solutions offering".

On 17 April 2024, ICEYE announced that it had closed an oversubscribed $93 million growth funding round. The round was led by Finnish sovereign wealth fund Solidium Oy and saw participation from Move Capital Fund I, Blackwells Capital, Christo Georgiev, and existing investors. A further 65 million extension to this round was announced on 18 December 2024, bringing the total funding to over $500 million by year-end 2024.

In December 2025, ICEYE raised an additional €150 million ($163 million) in a Series E round led by General Catalyst with additional broad European participation, placing the company at a valuation of €2.4 billion (approximately $2.8 billion). As of December 2025, ICEYE has raised more than $650 million in funding.

The company reported annual revenues of $100M for fiscal year 2023. In 2025, the company reported that it had reached profitability and doubled revenues to approximately €200 million for the year.

In May 2026, ICEYE secured a €300 million, three-year revolving credit facility to support the company's growth.

== Satellites ==
On 12 January 2018, a PSLV-XL rocket on PSLV-C40 mission carried ICEYE-X1 (also known as ICEYE POC1, COSPAR 2018-004D; POC stands for "Proof Of Concept") into orbit from the Satish Dhawan Space Centre. ICEYE-X1, at 70 kg (150 lb), was the first satellite under 100 kg (220 lb) to carry a synthetic-aperture radar, and was the first Finnish commercial satellite. The second satellite, ICEYE-X2 (ICEYE POC2, COSPAR 2018-099AU) was launched into orbit on 3 December 2018, at 18:34 UTC by a SpaceX Falcon 9 Block 5 rocket. The launch took place from the Vandenberg, SLC-4E.

The third ICEYE X payload was launched on 5 May 2019 on an Electron rocket from Rocket Lab Launch Complex 1, in New Zealand. The payload, called ICEYE-X3, was integrated into the Harbinger satellite (the satellite is also known as ICEYE X3, ICEYE POC3, COSPAR 2019-026E), a proof-of-concept prototype for a York Space Systems' S-class satellite bus. The Harbinger was launched on its demonstration mission, and the payloads integrated into the satellite included the ICEYE X3, BridgeSat's optical communications payload and Enpulsion of Austria's Field Emission Electric Propulsion system. The launch was conducted as the STP-27RD mission of the Space Test Program (STP) of the United States Army Space and Missile Defense Command, who sponsored the launch. The ICEYE-X3 radar payload had communications issues related to bus communications. These were reportedly solved. The fourth and fifth satellite, ICEYE-X4 (COSPAR 2019-038D) and ICEYE-X5 (COSPAR 2019-038C) were launched on 5 July 2019 by a Soyuz-2-1b rocket from Vostochny Cosmodrome Site 1S.

The next launch occurred on 28 September 2020, with Soyuz-2-1v from Plesetsk. This put ICEYE-X6 and ICEYE-X7 satellites into orbit. On 24 January 2021, three new satellites (ICEYE-X8, ICEYE-X9 and ICEYE-X10) were launched from Cape Canaveral SLC40 as part of record setting Falcon 9 Flight 106 (i.e. Transporter-1 mission). One of these, the ICEYE-X10, is actually a US-built version of the ICEYE satellites developed by R2 Space for the US government and has been renamed XR-1.

The cooperation between SpaceX and ICEYE continued with 6 more satellites launched with Falcon 9 Block 5 rockets, 4 on 30 June 2021 as part of the Transporter-2 mission (ICEYE-X11, ICEYE-X12, ICEYE-X13 and ICEYE-X15) and 2 on 13 January 2022 as part of the Transporter-3 mission (ICEYE-X14 and ICEYE-X16). Another 5 have been launched on 25 May 2022 as part of Transporter-5 (ICEYE-X17, X18, X19, X20 and X24) and 3 on 3 January 2023 as part of Transporter-6 (ICEYE-X21, X22 and X27). ICEYE-X22 failed to separate from the rocket upper stage, representing the first loss of a satellite for ICEYE. Four more satellites (ICEYE-X23, X25, X26 and X30) have been launched on 12 June 2023 on SpaceX's Transporter-8 mission and another four (ICEYE-X31, X32, X34 and X35) on 11 November 2023 on SpaceX's Transporter-9 mission.

Three more satellites were launched on 4 March 2024 (ICEYE-X36, X37, X38). That brings the total number of ICEYE satellites launched to 34. Another four satellites were launched on 16 August 2024 (ICEYE-X33, X39, X40, X43), which brought the launched satellite total to 38. In December 2024, it launched two more (ICEYE-X47, X49). During 2025, the company launched 22 satellites (ICEYE-X41, X42, X44, X45, X46, X48, X50 to X62, X65, X66, X67). On 5 December 2025, the company announced that it has launched 62 satellites. In 2026, the company launched 22 further satellites (ICEYE-X63, X64, X71 to X83 to X88, X109, and X110). All ICEYE-X launches between 2021 and 2026 were performed by Falcon 9.

== Operators ==
=== Clients of data collected from ICEYE's satellite constellation ===
This section lists the clients of data packages that are coming from the satellites operated by ICEYE.

(Germany) Rheinmetall
Rheinmetall cooperates with ICEYE to exploit the data accumulated by the constellation of satellites. Rheinmetall has exclusive rights to distribute data from satellites in Germany and Hungary to private and public clients.
(Sweden) Saab AB
MoU signed in March 2025 for a partnership to integrate space imagery data to command and control systems from Saab.
Ukraine (financed by Germany)
ICEYE-Rheinmetall provides the access to the constellation of satellites to Ukraine, which is financed by the German ministry of defence. This decision was made in November 2024.

=== Current operators ===
Finland
The Finnish Defence Forces placed an order for a satellite system from ICEYE in September 2025. The agreement included three satellites with options for additional units. The second satellite was launched in January 2026.
Greece (2)
On 8 September 2024, ICEYE signed a contract with the Hellenic Space Center, the Greek Ministry of Digital Governance, and the European Space Agency (ESA) for two Greek sovereign satellites and access to the company's existing constellation. The two Greek satellites were launched on 28 November 2025 aboard Falcon 9's Transporter-15 rideshare mission. This was the first operational Earth observation satellite launch under the Greek National Small Satellite Programme, funded by the EU and coordinated by ESA.
Netherlands (4)
Four satellites ordered by the Royal Netherlands Air and Space Force. The first satellite was put in orbit in June 2025, with the Transporter-14 rideshare mission with SpaceX. The model selected has a 25 cm resolution. It includes a fixed ground segment with antenna, and a mobile ground segment.
Poland (4)
In May 2025, Poland signed a contract to buy ICEYE satellites as part of its MikroSAR program. The model selected has a 25 cm resolution. Poland calls its constellation of ICEYE satellites, alongside the MikroGLOB program, "POLSARIS". The first Polish satellite (ICEYE-X62/MikroSAR 1) was launched on 28 November 2025 on Falcon 9's Transporter-15 mission. Another pair (ICEYE-X75/MikroSAR 2 and X76/MikroSAR 3) was launched in March 2026. The fourth satellite (ICEYE-X78/MikroSAR 4) was launched on 3 May 2026 on Falcon 9's CAS500-2 rideshare mission.
Portugal (2)
In December 2025, the FAP (Força Aérea Portuguesa) signed a contract to acquire one satellite. The Portuguese satellite was launched on 30 March 2026 aboard Falcon 9's Transporter-16 rideshare mission. The second satellite, and first wholly owned by the Portuguese Air Force, was launched on 3 May 2026 on Falcon 9's CAS500-2 rideshare mission. The Portuguese satellites are part of the Atlantic Constellation.

=== Future operators ===
(Japan) IHI Corporation (4 + 20 option)
Japan company ordered 4 satellites in October 2025 from 2026, with up to 24 satellites planned by 2029.
Sweden (10)
The Swedish Armed Forces signed a contract with ICEYE, announced on 12 January 2026. The agreement covers the delivery of satellites and their associated data. The contract is worth SEK1.3 billion (USD $142 million), for 10 satellites. The deliveries will take place between 2026 and 2028.

== See also ==
- Eycore-1 – Polish synthetic-aperture radar satellite
