= List of space launches of Ukrainian launch vehicles =

The emblem of the State Space Agency of Ukraine

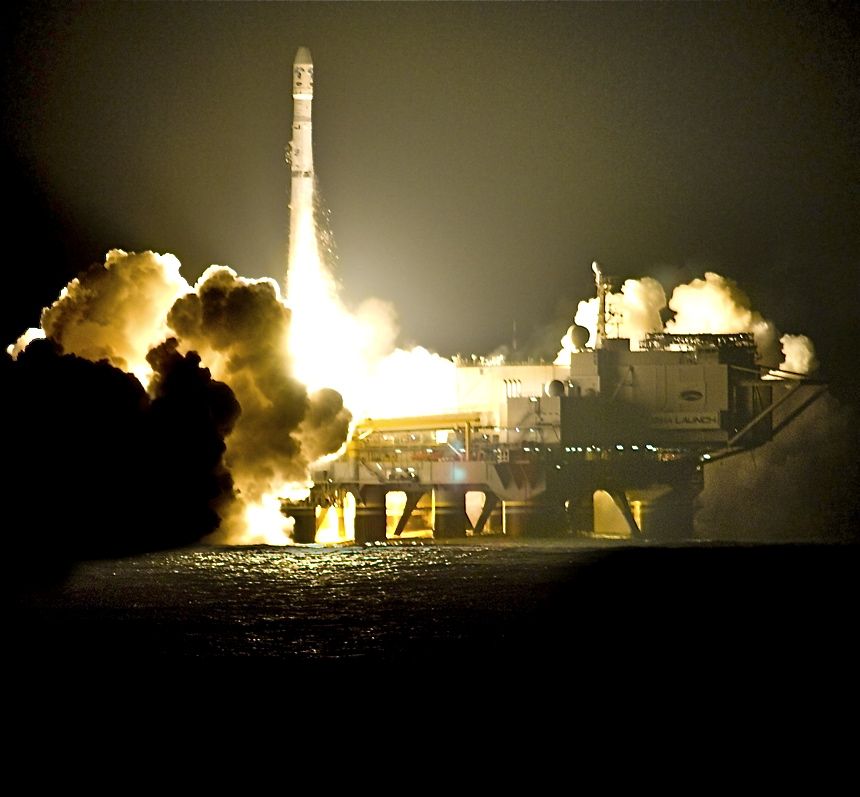
Zenit-3SL launch from a sea launch site

The List of space launches by Ukrainian launch vehicles contains a list of 170 launches of Ukrainian-built launch vehicles carried out between 24 August 1991 and 31 July 2022. Thanks to these launches, hundreds of satellites for various purposes have been placed into Earth orbit.

== State Space Agency of Ukraine ==
In 1991, following the collapse of the USSR, Ukraine inherited almost a third of the Soviet Union’s missile and space capabilities. Following Ukraine’s declaration of a nuclear-free status, the intercontinental ballistic missiles stationed on Ukrainian territory were taken off combat duty and dismantled, and the country’s missile and space programme was reoriented exclusively towards peaceful purposes.

On 29 February 1992, a Presidential Decree issued under the Cabinet of Ministers of Ukraine established the National Space Agency of Ukraine, which took over the management of more than 30 design bureaux, scientific organisations and institutions, military units and industrial enterprises directly involved in space activities. These included the Dnipro-based enterprises State Enterprise KB Pivdenne and the Pivdenmash, those in Kharkiv — Kommunar, Khartron, and the Research Institute of Radio Measurements, those in Kyiv — the Central Design Bureau and the Arsenal Factory, Kyivprylad, and the Kyiv Radio Plant, and the National Space Facilities Control and Test Center.

== List of Ukrainian launch vehicles ==
#	Name	Manufacturer	Year introduced	Height	Mass	Payload	Cost	Number of launches
1	Zenit-3SLBF	Yuzhmash Ukraine	2011	59.6 m	471,000 kg	3,750 kg	N/A	4
2	Zenit-3SLB	Yuzhmash Ukraine	2008	59.6 m	471,000 kg	3,750 kg	N/A	11
3	Zenit-3SL	Yuzhmash Ukraine	1999	59.6 m	462,200 kg	6,060 kg	N/A	36
4	Zenit-2	Yuzhmash Ukraine	1985	57.0 m	460,000 kg	13,740 kg	N/A	36/21
5	Tsyklon-2	Yuzhmash Ukraine	1963	39.7 m	182,000 kg	2,820 kg	N/A	14
6	Tsyklon-3	Yuzhmash Ukraine	1977	39.27 m	187,000 kg	4,000 kg	N/A	33
7	Tsyklon-4M	Yuzhmash Ukraine	2022	38.7 m	over 274,700 kg	up to 5,000 kg to a 600 km orbit	N/A	0
8	Dnepr	Yuzhmash Ukraine	1999	34.3 m	211,000 kg	4,500 kg	$29 million	22
9	Antares	OSC United States Yuzhmash Ukraine	2013	40.5 m	329,000 kg	7,000 kg	$85 million	16
10	Vega	Avio Italy Yuzhmash Ukraine	2012	30.0 m	137,000 kg	1,500 kg	$37 million	20
11	Skyrora	Skyrora Limited United Kingdom Ukraine	2018	N/A	N/A	N/A	N/A	0
12	Firefly Alpha	Firefly Aerospace United States Ukraine	2019	29.0 m	54,000 kg	1,000 kg	$10 million	0

== Statistics on the number of launches of launch vehicles manufactured in Ukraine ==
Year	Antares	Vega	Vega-C	Zenit-3SLB	Zenit-3SL	Zenit-2	Tsyklon-2	Tsyklon-3	Dnipro	Total	Total launches worldwide	% of all global launches
1991						0 (1)	1	3 (8)		4 (10)	94	10,6
1992						4		5		9	97	9,3
1993						2	4	4		10	83	12,0
1994						4	1	7		12	93	12,9
1995						1	2	1		4	80	5,0
1996						1	1	1		3	77	3,9
1997						1	1	1		3	89	3,4
1998						2		1		3	82	3,7
1999					2	1	1		1	5	79	6,3
2000					3	2		1	1	7	84	8,3
2001					2	1	1	2		6	59	10,2
2002					1				1	2	65	3,1
2003					3					3	63	4,8
2004					3	1	1	1	1	7	54	13,0
2005					4				1	5	55	9,0
2006					5		1		2	8	66	12,1
2007					1	1			3	5	68	7,4
2008				1	5				2	8	69	11,6
2009				3	1			1	1	6	78	7,7
2010									3	3	74	4,1
2011				4	1				1	6	84	7,1
2012		1			3					4	76	4
2013	2	1		1	1				2	7	82	8,5
2014	3	1			1				2	7	92	7,6
2015		3		1					1	5	86	5,8
2016	1	2								3	85	3,5
2017	1	3		1						5	91	5,5
2018	2	2								4	114	3,5
2019	2	2								4	102	3,9
2020	2	2								4	114	3,5
2021	2	3								5	135	3,7
2022	1		1							2
Total	16	20	1	11	36	22	14	33	22	175

== List of launches ==
No.	Date	Launch vehicle	Launch site	Payload	Result
1.	30 August 1991	Zenit-2	Baikonur Cosmodrome	Tselina-2	Failure
2.	28 September 1991	Tsyklon-3	Plesetsk Cosmodrome	Kosmos 2157, Kosmos 2158, Kosmos 2159, Kosmos 2160, Kosmos 2161, Kosmos 2162	Success
3.	12 November 1991	Tsyklon-3	Plesetsk Cosmodrome	Kosmos 2165, Kosmos 2166, Kosmos 2167, Kosmos 2168, Kosmos 2169, Kosmos 2170	Success
4.	18 December 1991	Tsyklon-3	Plesetsk Cosmodrome	Interkosmos 25	Success
5.	2 February 1992	Zenit-2	Baikonur Cosmodrome	Tselina-2	Failure
6.	13 July 1992	Zenit-2	Baikonur Cosmodrome	Kosmos 2196, Kosmos 2198, Kosmos 2199, Kosmos 2200, Kosmos 2201, Kosmos 2202	Success
7.	13 July 1992	Tsyklon-3	Plesetsk Cosmodrome	Kosmos 2197–2202	Success
8.	20 October 1992	Tsyklon-3	Plesetsk Cosmodrome	Kosmos 2211, Kosmos 2212, Kosmos 2213, Kosmos 2214, Kosmos 2215, Kosmos 2216	Success
9.	17 November 1992	Zenit-2	Baikonur Cosmodrome	Kosmos 2219	Success
10.	24 November 1992	Tsyklon-3	Plesetsk Cosmodrome	Kosmos 2221	Success
11.	22 December 1992	Tsyklon-3	Plesetsk Cosmodrome	Kosmos 2226	Success
12.	25 December 1992	Zenit-2	Baikonur Cosmodrome	Kosmos 2227	Success
13.	25 December 1992	Tsyklon-3	Plesetsk Cosmodrome	Kosmos 2228	Success
14.	26 March 1993	Zenit-2	Baikonur Cosmodrome	Kosmos 2237	Success
15.	30 March 1993	Tsyklon-2	Baikonur Cosmodrome	Kosmos 2238	Success
16.	16 April 1993	Tsyklon-3	Plesetsk Cosmodrome	Kosmos 2242	Success
17.	28 April 1993	Tsyklon-2	Baikonur Cosmodrome	Kosmos 2244	Success
18.	11 May 1993	Tsyklon-3	Plesetsk Cosmodrome	Kosmos 2245, Kosmos 2246, Kosmos 2247, Kosmos 2248, Kosmos 2249, Kosmos 2250	Success
19.	24 June 1993	Tsyklon-3	Plesetsk Cosmodrome	Kosmos 2252, Kosmos 2253, Kosmos 2254, Kosmos 2255, Kosmos 2256, Kosmos 2257	Success
20.	7 July 1993	Tsyklon-2	Baikonur Cosmodrome	Kosmos 2258	Success
21.	31 August 1993	Tsyklon-3	Plesetsk Cosmodrome	Meteor-2-21	Success
22.	16 September 1993	Zenit-2	Baikonur Cosmodrome	Kosmos 2263	Success
23.	17 September 1993	Tsyklon-2	Baikonur Cosmodrome	Kosmos 2264	Success
24.	25 January 1994	Tsyklon-3	Plesetsk Cosmodrome	Meteor-3-06	Success
25.	12 February 1994	Tsyklon-3	Plesetsk Cosmodrome	Kosmos 2268, Kosmos 2269, Kosmos 2270, Kosmos 2271, Kosmos 2272, Kosmos 2273	Success
26.	2 March 1994	Tsyklon-3	Plesetsk Cosmodrome	AUOS-SM-KI-IK (Koronas-I)	Success
27.	23 April 1994	Zenit-2	Baikonur Cosmodrome	Kosmos 2278	Success
28.	25 May 1994	Tsyklon-3	Plesetsk Cosmodrome	Tselina-D	Failure
29.	26 August 1994	Zenit-2	Baikonur Cosmodrome	Kosmos 2290	Success
30.	11 October 1994	Tsyklon-3	Plesetsk Cosmodrome	Okean-4	Success
31.	2 November 1994	Tsyklon-2	Baikonur Cosmodrome	Kosmos 2293	Success
32.	4 November 1994	Zenit-2	Baikonur Cosmodrome	Resurs-01 No. 3	Success
33.	24 November 1994	Zenit-2	Baikonur Cosmodrome	Kosmos 2297	Success
34.	29 November 1994	Tsyklon-3	Plesetsk Cosmodrome	GEO-IK-1	Success
35.	26 December 1994	Tsyklon-3	Plesetsk Cosmodrome	Kosmos 2299, Kosmos 2300, Kosmos 2301, Kosmos 2302, Kosmos 2303, Kosmos 2304	Success
36.	8 June 1995	Tsyklon-2	Baikonur Cosmodrome	Kosmos 2313	Success
37.	31 August 1995	Tsyklon-3	Plesetsk Cosmodrome	Sich-1 (Ukraine), FASat-Alfa (Chile)	Success
38.	31 October 1995	Zenit-2	Baikonur Cosmodrome	Kosmos 2322	Success
39.	20 December 1995	Tsyklon-2	Baikonur Cosmodrome	Kosmos 2326	Success
40.	19 February 1996	Tsyklon-3	Plesetsk Cosmodrome	Gonets-D1 No. 1, Gonets-D1 No. 2, Gonets-D1 No. 3, Kosmos 2328, Kosmos 2329, Kosmos 2330	Success
41.	4 September 1996	Zenit-2	Baikonur Cosmodrome	Kosmos 2333	Success
42.	11 December 1996	Tsyklon-2	Baikonur Cosmodrome	Kosmos 2335	Success
43.	14 February 1997	Tsyklon-3	Plesetsk Cosmodrome	Gonets-D1 No. 4, Gonets-D1 No. 5, Gonets-D1 No. 6, Kosmos 2337, Kosmos 2338, Kosmos 2339	Success
44.	20 May 1997	Zenit-2	Baikonur Cosmodrome	Tselina-2	Failure
45.	9 December 1997	Tsyklon-2	Baikonur Cosmodrome	Kosmos 2347	Success
46.	15 June 1998	Tsyklon-3	Plesetsk Cosmodrome	Kosmos 2352, Kosmos 2353, Kosmos 2354, Kosmos 2355, Kosmos 2356, Kosmos 2357	Success
47.	10 July 1998	Zenit-2	Baikonur Cosmodrome	FASat-Bravo, TechSat 1B, TMSAT, WESTPAC, Safir 2, Resurs-01 No. 4	Success
48.	9 September 1998	Zenit-2	Baikonur Cosmodrome	Globalstar 7, 8, 9, 10, 11, 12, 13, 16, 17, 18, 20, 21	Failure
49.	28 March 1999	Zenit-3SL	Sea Launch platform Odyssey	Mock-up of communications satellite "Demosat"	Success
50.	21 April 1999	Dnepr	Baikonur Cosmodrome	UoSAT-12, SSTL (England)	Success
51.	17 July 1999	Zenit-2	Baikonur Cosmodrome	Okean-O	Success
52.	10 October 1999	Zenit-3SL	Sea Launch platform Odyssey	DIRECTV 1-R	Success
53.	26 December 1999	Tsyklon-2	Baikonur Cosmodrome	Kosmos 2367	Success
54.	3 February 2000	Zenit-2	Baikonur Cosmodrome	Kosmos 2369	Success
55.	12 March 2000	Zenit-3SL	Sea Launch platform Odyssey	ICO F-1	Failure
56.	29 July 2000	Zenit-3SL	Sea Launch platform Odyssey	PAS-9 (PanAmSat)	Success
57.	25 September 2000	Tsyklon-2	Baikonur Cosmodrome	Kosmos 2372	Success
58.	26 September 2000	Dnepr	Baikonur Cosmodrome	MegSat-1 (Italy), UniSat (University of Rome, Italy), SaudiSat-1A/1B (Saudi Arabia), TiungSat-1 (Malaysia)	Success
59.	21 October 2000	Zenit-3SL	Sea Launch platform Odyssey	Thuraya-1	Success
60.	27 December 2000	Tsyklon-3	Plesetsk Cosmodrome	6 Strela-3 communications satellites	Failure
61.	19 March 2001	Zenit-3SL	Sea Launch platform Odyssey	XM Radio-2	Success
62.	5 May 2001	Zenit-3SL	Sea Launch platform Odyssey	XM Radio-1	Success
63.	31 July 2001	Tsyklon-3	Plesetsk Cosmodrome	Koronas-F	Success
64.	10 December 2001	Zenit-2	Baikonur Cosmodrome	Meteor-3M, Kompas-2, Reflektor, MarocTubsat, Badr-R	Success
65.	21 December 2001	Tsyklon-2	Baikonur Cosmodrome	Kosmos 2383	Success
66.	28 December 2001	Tsyklon-3	Plesetsk Cosmodrome	Kosmos 2384, Kosmos 2385, Kosmos 2386, Gonets-D1 No. 10, Gonets-D1 No. 11, Gonets-D1 No. 12	Success
67.	15 June 2002	Zenit-3SL	Sea Launch platform Odyssey	Galaxy IIIC	Success
68.	20 December 2002	Dnepr	Baikonur Cosmodrome	LatinSat-A, LatinSat-B (Argentina), UniSat-2 (Italy), SaudiSat-1C (Saudi Arabia), Rubin-2 (Germany), TrailBlazer	Success
69.	10 June 2003	Zenit-3SL	Sea Launch platform Odyssey	Thuraya-2	Success
70.	8 August 2003	Zenit-3SL	Sea Launch platform Odyssey	EchoStar IX	Success
71.	10 October 2003	Zenit-3SL	Sea Launch platform Odyssey	Galaxy 13	Success
72.	11 January 2004	Zenit-3SL	Sea Launch platform Odyssey	Telstar 14 / Estrela do Sul 1	Success
73.	4 May 2004	Zenit-3SL	Sea Launch platform Odyssey	DirecTV-7S	Success
74.	28 May 2004	Tsyklon-2	Baikonur Cosmodrome	Kosmos 2407	Success
75.	10 June 2004	Zenit-2	Baikonur Cosmodrome	Kosmos 2406	Success
76.	29 June 2004	Dnepr	Baikonur Cosmodrome	Demeter, UniSat-3, SaudiSat-2, SaudiComsat-1, SaudiComsat-2, LatinSat-C, LatinSat-D, AMSAT-Echo	Success
77.	29 June 2004	Zenit-3SL	Sea Launch platform Odyssey	Telstar 18	Partial success
78.	24 December 2004	Tsyklon-3	Plesetsk Cosmodrome	Sich-1M, KS5MF2 microsatellite	Success
79.	1 March 2005	Zenit-3SL	Sea Launch platform Odyssey	XM Radio-3	Success
80.	26 April 2005	Zenit-3SL	Sea Launch platform Odyssey	Spaceway-1	Success
81.	23 June 2005	Zenit-3SL	Sea Launch platform Odyssey	Intelsat Americas 8	Success
82.	24 August 2005	Dnepr	Baikonur Cosmodrome	OICETS, INDEX	Success
83.	8 November 2005	Zenit-3SL	Sea Launch platform Odyssey	Inmarsat 4-F2	Success
84.	16 February 2006	Zenit-3SL	Sea Launch platform Odyssey	EchoStar X	Success
85.	13 April 2006	Zenit-3SL	Sea Launch platform Odyssey	JCSAT-9	Success
86.	18 June 2006	Zenit-3SL	Sea Launch platform Odyssey	Galaxy 16	Success
87.	25 June 2006	Tsyklon-2	Baikonur Cosmodrome	Kosmos 2421	Success
88.	12 July 2006	Dnepr	Yasny Cosmodrome	Genesis I	Success
89.	26 July 2006	Dnepr	Baikonur Cosmodrome	Baumanets, BelKA	Failure
90.	22 August 2006	Zenit-3SL	Sea Launch platform Odyssey	Koreasat 5	Success
91.	31 October 2006	Zenit-3SL	Sea Launch platform Odyssey	XM 4	Success
92.	31 January 2007	Zenit-3SL	Sea Launch platform Odyssey	NSS-8	Failure
93.	17 April 2007	Dnepr	Baikonur Cosmodrome	EgyptSat 1	Success
94.	15 June 2007	Dnepr	Baikonur Cosmodrome	TerraSAR-X	Success
95.	28 June 2007	Dnepr	Yasny Cosmodrome	Genesis II	Success
96.	29 June 2007	Zenit-2	Baikonur Cosmodrome	Kosmos (classified payload)	Success
97.	15 January 2008	Zenit-3SL	Sea Launch platform Odyssey	Thuraya-3	Success
98.	20 March 2008	Zenit-3SL	Sea Launch platform Odyssey	DirecTV-11	Success
99.	28 April 2008	Zenit-3SLB	Baikonur Cosmodrome	AMOS-3	Success
100.	21 May 2008	Zenit-3SL	Sea Launch platform Odyssey	Galaxy 18	Success
101.	16 July 2008	Zenit-3SL	Sea Launch platform Odyssey	EchoStar XI	Success
102.	29 August 2008	Dnepr	Baikonur Cosmodrome	5 RapidEye satellites	Success
103.	24 September 2008	Zenit-3SL	Sea Launch platform Odyssey	Galaxy 19	Success
104.	1 October 2008	Dnepr	Yasny Cosmodrome	THEOS	Success
105.	30 January 2009	Tsyklon-3	Plesetsk Cosmodrome	Koronas-Foton	Success
106.	26 February 2009	Zenit-3SLB	Baikonur Cosmodrome	Telstar 11N	Success
107.	20 April 2009	Zenit-3SL	Sea Launch platform Odyssey	Sicral 1B	Success
108.	22 June 2009	Zenit-3SLB	Baikonur Cosmodrome	MEASAT-1R	Success
109.	29 July 2009	Dnepr	Baikonur Cosmodrome	DubaiSat-1 (UAE), Deimos-1 (Spain), UK-DMC2 (United Kingdom), NanoSat-1B (Spain), AprizeSat-3, AprizeSat-4 (USA)	Success
110.	30 November 2009	Zenit-3SLB	Baikonur Cosmodrome	American communications satellite Intelsat 15	Success
111.	8 April 2010	Dnepr	Baikonur Cosmodrome	European scientific satellite CryoSat-2	Success
112.	15 June 2010	Dnepr	Yasny Cosmodrome	PRISMA satellites of the Swedish Space Corporation (SSC), Picard of the French space agency (CNES), and a Ukrainian advanced avionics unit (BPA) for the guidance system of the Tsyklon-4 launch vehicle and future rockets	Success
113.	21 June 2010	Dnepr	Baikonur Cosmodrome	TanDEM-X	Success
114.	20 January 2011	Zenit-3SLB	Baikonur Cosmodrome	Russian meteorological satellite Elektro-L	Success
115.	18 July 2011	Zenit-3SLB	Baikonur Cosmodrome	Spektr-R	Success
116.	17 August 2011	Dnepr	Yasny Cosmodrome	Sich-2, BPA-2, NigeriaSat-2, NigeriaSat-X, RASAT, EduSAT, AprizeSat-5, AprizeSat-6	Success
117.	24 September 2011	Zenit-3SL	Sea Launch platform Odyssey	Atlantic Bird 7	Success
118.	6 October 2011	Zenit-3SLB	Baikonur Cosmodrome	Intelsat 18	Success
119.	9 November 2011	Zenit-3SLB	Baikonur Cosmodrome	Fobos-Grunt	Partial success
120.	13 February 2012	Vega	Guiana Space Centre (Kourou)	AlmaSAT-1, LARES (Italy), 7 CubeSat microsatellites (USA)	Success
121.	1 June 2012	Zenit-3SL	Sea Launch platform Odyssey	Intelsat 19	Success
122.	19 August 2012	Zenit-3SL	Sea Launch platform Odyssey	Intelsat 21	Success
123.	3 December 2012	Zenit-3SL	Sea Launch platform Odyssey	Eutelsat 70B	Success
124.	1 February 2013	Zenit-3SL	Sea Launch platform Odyssey	Intelsat 27	Failure
125.	21 April 2013	Antares	Wallops Flight Facility	Mass simulator of Cygnus	Success
126.	7 May 2013	Vega	Guiana Space Centre (Kourou)	VNREDSat-1, ESTCube-1, Proba-V	Success
127.	22 August 2013	Dnepr	Yasny Cosmodrome	KOMPSAT-5	Success
128.	31 August 2013	Zenit-3SLB	Baikonur Cosmodrome	AMOS-4	Success
129.	18 September 2013	Antares	Wallops Flight Facility	Actual Cygnus spacecraft	Success
130.	21 November 2013	Dnepr	Yasny Cosmodrome	DubaiSat-2 (UAE), SkySat-1, AprizeSat-7/8 (USA), GOMX-1 (Denmark), WNISAT (Japan), BRITE-PL (Poland), ISIPOD containers (Netherlands) with CubeSat spacecraft, STSat-3 (South Korea), UniSat-5 (Italy) and Ukrainian advanced avionics unit BPA-3	Success
131.	9 January 2014	Antares	Wallops Flight Facility	Cygnus CRS Orb-1	Success
132.	30 April 2014	Vega	Guiana Space Centre (Kourou)	KazEOSat-1	Success
133.	27 May 2014	Zenit-3SL	Sea Launch platform Odyssey	Eutelsat 3B	Success
134.	19 June 2014	Dnepr	Yasny Cosmodrome	Cluster of 33 satellites, including KazEOSat-2 and PolyITAN-1	Success
135.	13 July 2014	Antares	Wallops Flight Facility	Cygnus	Success
136.	28 October 2014	Antares	Wallops Flight Facility	Cygnus carrying 2.5 tonnes of cargo for the International Space Station	Failure
137.	6 November 2014	Dnepr	Yasny Cosmodrome	ASNARO, Hodoyoshi-1, ChubuSat-1, Tsubame, QSAT-EOS	Success
138.	11 February 2015	Vega	Guiana Space Centre (Kourou)	IXV	Success
139.	26 March 2015	Dnepr	Yasny Cosmodrome	KOMPSAT-3A	Success
140.	23 June 2015	Vega	Guiana Space Centre (Kourou)	Sentinel-2A	Partial success
141.	3 December 2015	Vega	Guiana Space Centre (Kourou)	LISA Pathfinder	Success
142.	11 December 2015	Zenit-3SLBF	Baikonur Cosmodrome	Elektro-L No. 2	Success
144.	16 September 2016	Vega	Guiana Space Centre (Kourou)	PeruSat-1, SkySat-4, SkySat-5, SkySat-6, SkySat-7	Success
145.	18 October 2016	Antares	Wallops Flight Facility	Cygnus carrying 2.3 tonnes of cargo for the International Space Station	Success
146.	5 December 2016	Vega	Guiana Space Centre (Kourou)	Göktürk-1	Success
147.	7 March 2017	Vega	Guiana Space Centre (Kourou)	Sentinel-2B	Success
148.	2 August 2017	Vega	Guiana Space Centre (Kourou)	OPTSAT-3000, Venµs	Success
149.	8 November 2017	Vega	Guiana Space Centre (Kourou)	Mohammed VI-A	Success
150.	12 November 2017	Antares	Wallops Flight Facility	Cygnus	Success
151.	26 December 2017	Zenit-3SLBF	Baikonur Cosmodrome	AngoSat-1	Success
152.	21 May 2018	Antares	Wallops Flight Facility	Cygnus OA-9E, CubeRRT, HaloSat, Radix, RainCube, TEMPEST-D, AeroCube 12A, AeroCube 12B, RadSat-g, EQUiSat, MemSat, EnduroSat One and four Lemur-2 satellites	Success
153.	22 August 2018	Vega	Guiana Space Centre (Kourou)	ADM-Aeolus	Success
154.	17 November 2018	Antares	Wallops Flight Facility	Cygnus NG-10, CHEFSat 2, KickSat 2, MYSAT 1	Success
155.	21 November 2018	Vega	Guiana Space Centre (Kourou)	Mohammed VI-B	Success
156.	22 March 2019	Vega	Guiana Space Centre (Kourou)	PRISMA	Success
157.	17 April 2019	Antares	Wallops Flight Facility	Cygnus OA-9E, SASSI², BIRD-JPN, BIRD-LKA, BIRD-NPL, ThinSat-1, VCC A/B/C, KRAKsat, Światowid, SpooQy-1, IOD-GEMS, EntrySat, AeroCube-10a/b, Seeker	Partial success
158.	11 July 2019	Vega	Guiana Space Centre (Kourou)	Falcon Eye 1	Failure
159.	2 November 2019	Antares	Wallops Flight Facility	Cygnus OA-9E, STPSat-4, HARP, Phoenix, RadSat-u, SOCRATES, MVP-Argus, HuskySat-1, SwampSat-2, AeroCube 14A/B, AeroCube 15A/B, Orbital Factory 2	Success
160.	17 February 2020	Antares	Wallops Flight Facility	Cygnus NG-13, Red-Eye 2, Red-Eye 3, DeMi, TechEdSat-10	Success
161.	3 September 2020	Vega	Guiana Space Centre (Kourou)	7 microsatellites and 46 nanosatellites (cubesats)	Success
162.	3 October 2020	Antares	Wallops Flight Facility	Cygnus NG-14, Bobcat-1, NEUTRON-1, SPOC, Lemur-2, DESCENT, SATLLA-1	Success
163.	17 November 2020	Vega	Guiana Space Centre (Kourou)	SEOSat-Ingenio, Taranis	Failure
164.	20 February 2021	Antares	Wallops Flight Facility	Cygnus NG-15, MMSATS-1, 9 ThinSat-2 satellites, GuaraníSat-1, Gunsmoke-J 2, Hiroagari, IT-SPINS, ORCA-7, Maya-2, MySat-2, RSP-01, STARS-EC, TAU-SAT1, Tsuru, WARP-01, and a classified CubeBox payload for the United States	Success
165.	29 April 2021	Vega	Guiana Space Centre (Kourou)	Pléiades Neo 3, NorSat-3, All-Bravo, ELO-Alpha and two Lemur-2 satellites	Success
166.	11 August 2021	Antares	Wallops Flight Facility	Cygnus NG-16, PIRPL	Success
167.	17 August 2021	Vega	Guiana Space Centre (Kourou)	Pléiades Neo 4, BRO-4, LEDSAT, RADCUBE and SUNSTORM	Success
168.	16 November 2021	Vega	Guiana Space Centre (Kourou)	3 CERES satellites	Success
169.	19 February 2022	Antares	Wallops Flight Facility	Cygnus NG-17, IHI-SAT, KITSUNE, NACHOS	Success
170.	11 August 2022	Vega C	Guiana Space Centre (Kourou)	LARES-2, AstroBio CubeSat, GreenCube, TriSat-R, CELESTA, MTCube-2, ALPHA	Success

== Gallery ==
=== Photos and diagrams of launch vehicles ===
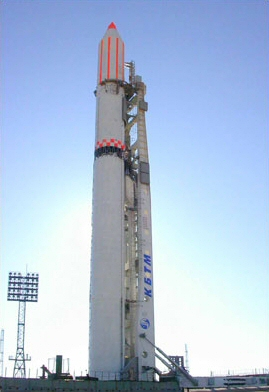
Zenit-2 is ready for launch on 10 December 2001, Baikonur

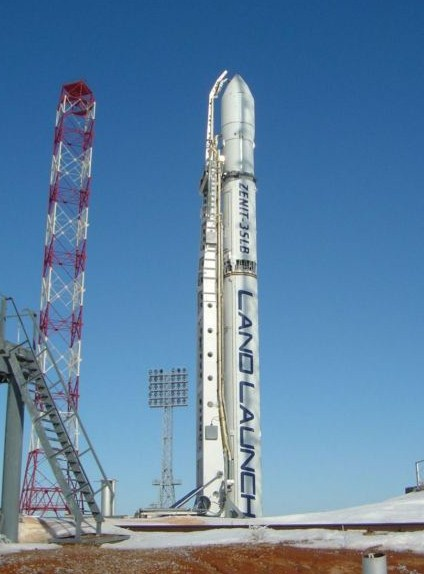
Zenit-3SLB.

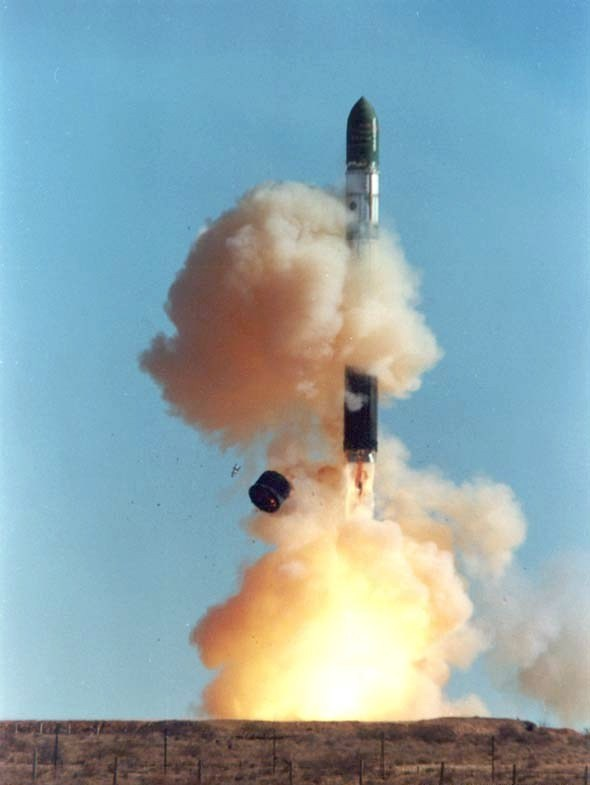
The Launch of the Dnipro

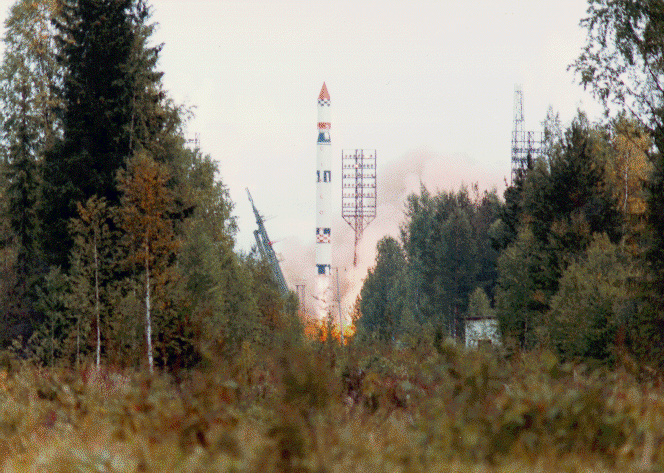
The launch of Tsyklon-3

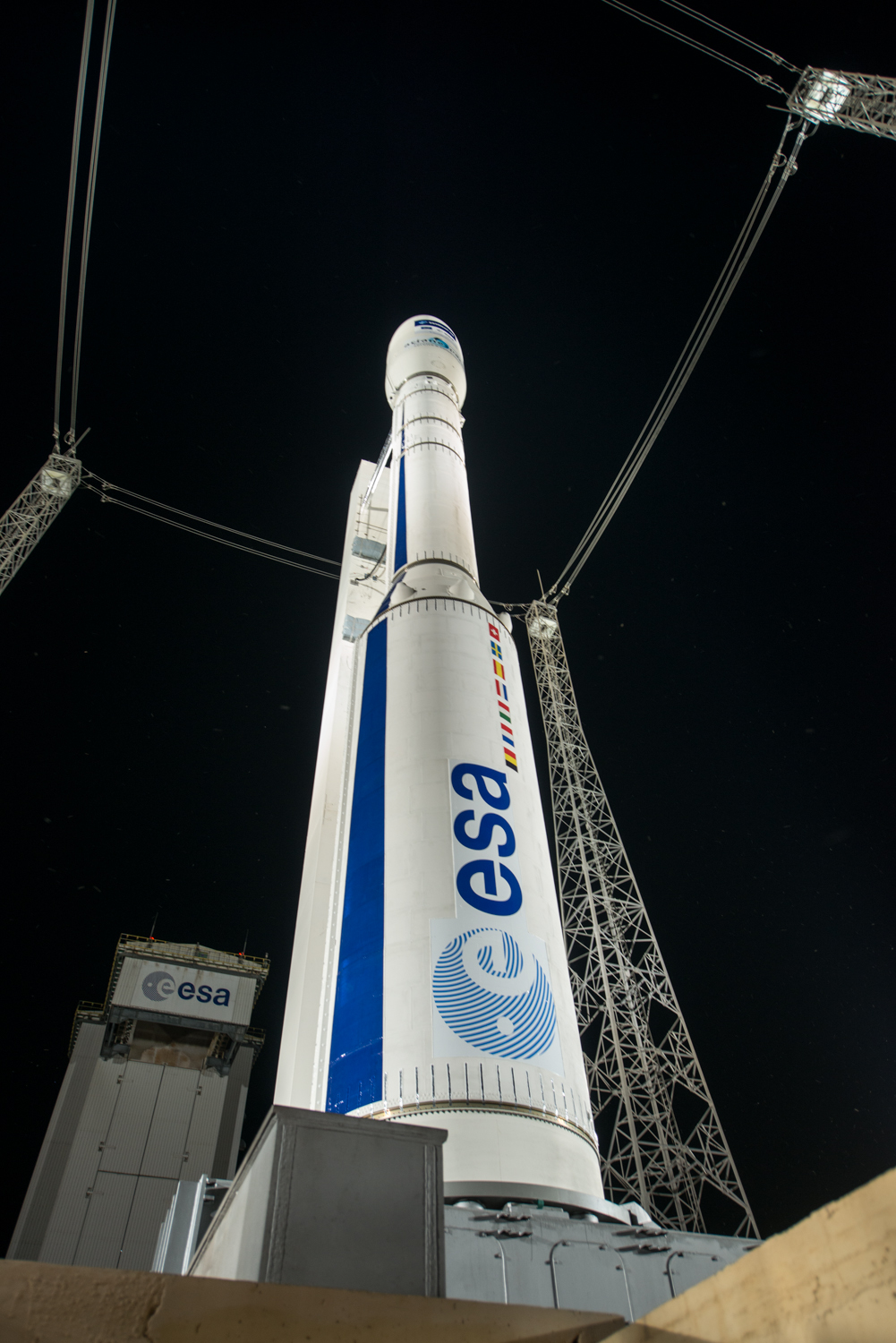
VEGA before launch

Zenit-3SL diagram

Tsyklon-3 diagram

Zenit-3SLB diagram

Tsyklon-2 diagram

VEGA diagram

=== In numismatics and philately ===
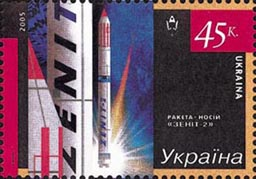
The ‘Zenit-2’ launch vehicle on a Ukrainian postage stamp, 2005

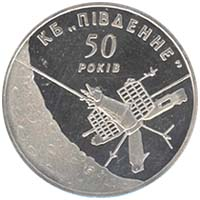
The NBU’s commemorative coin ‘50 Years of KB Pivdenne’, featuring the Sich-1M satellite

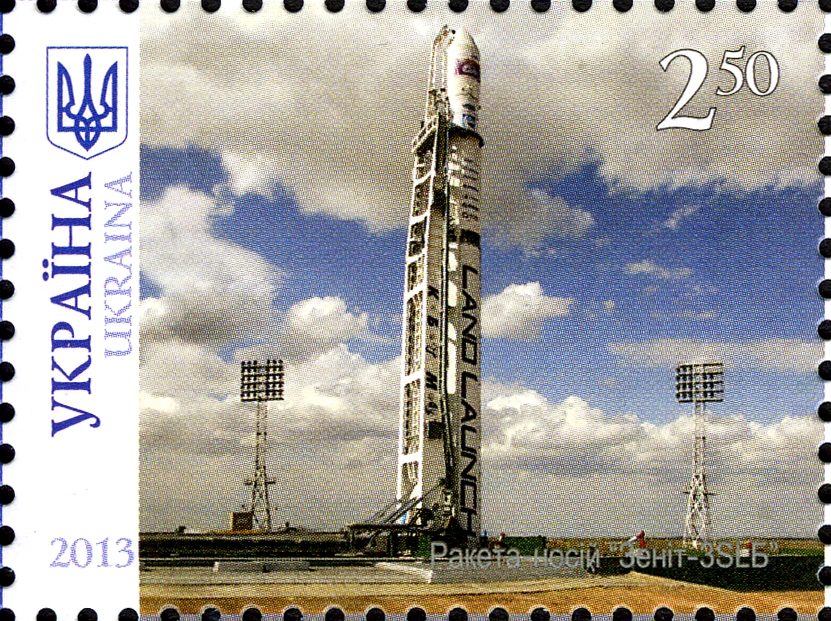
The ‘Zenit-3SLB’ launch vehicle on a Ukrainian postage stamp, 2013

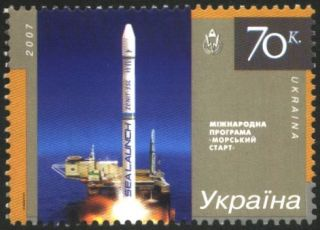
"Sea Launch", 2007 issue

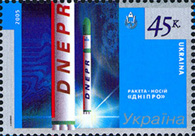
The ‘Dnipro’ launch vehicle on a Ukrainian postage stamp, 2005

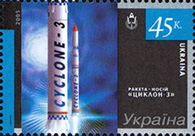
The ‘Cyclone-3’ launch vehicle on a Ukrainian postage stamp, 2005

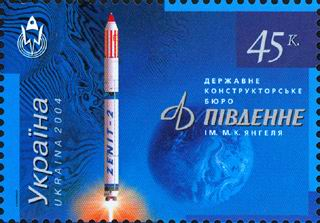
The stamp is dedicated to ‘KB Pivdenne’ (2004)

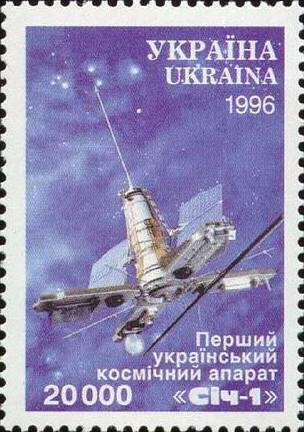
‘Sich-1’ on the 2000 stamp

== See also ==
- State Space Agency of Ukraine
- Timeline of spaceflight
- List of human spaceflights
- List of Space Shuttle missions
