= State Space Agency of Ukraine =

Ukrainian government agency

- Державне космічне агентство України

Agency overview
- Abbreviation: SSAU
- Formed: February 1992 (as National Space Agency of Ukraine)
- Type: Space agency
- Headquarters: Kyiv
- Administrator: Volodymyr Ben'
- Annual budget: $80.4 million (2019)
- Website: www.nkau.gov.ua

The State Space Agency of Ukraine (SSAU; Ukrainian: Державне космічне агентство України (ДКАУ), romanized: Derzhavne kosmichne ahentstvo Ukrainy) is the Ukrainian government agency responsible for space policy and programs. It was formed on 29 February 1992, and was based on the Soviet space program infrastructure that remained in Ukraine following the dissolution of the Soviet Union. It was called the National Space Agency of Ukraine (NSAU; Національне космічне агентство України, НКАУ) until 9 December 2010.

Ukrainian spacecraft include a few types for domestic and foreign use and international cooperation. Ukraine has supplied Russia with military satellites and their launch vehicles, a relationship unique in the world. The agency does not have its own spaceport. It used the resources of the Russian Federal Space Agency until 2014. Launches were conducted at Kazakhstan's Baikonur and Russia's Plesetsk Cosmodromes. After the Russian annexation of Crimea, launches were conducted on Sea Launch's floating platform, which was soon mothballed. SSAU has ground control and tracking facilities in Kyiv and a control center in Dunaivtsi (Khmelnytskyi Oblast). Facilities in Yevpatoria, Crimea, had to be abandoned with the 2014 Russian occupation of Crimea. Since the start of the Russo-Ukrainian War in 2014, the agency has been transitioning its cooperation efforts away from Russia, with participation in other space programs. Along with the Ukrainian Defense Industry conglomerate and the Antonov Aeronautical Scientific-Technical Complex, the agency is a major state-owned component of the defense industry of Ukraine.

== Main tasks ==
- Development of state policy concepts in the sphere of research and peaceful uses of space, as well as in the interests of national security;
- Organization and development of space activities in Ukraine and under its jurisdiction abroad;
- Contributing to state national security and defense capability;
- Organization and development of Ukraine's cooperation with other states and international space organizations.

SSAU is a civil body in charge of co-ordinating the efforts of government installations, research, and industrial companies (mostly state-owned). Several space-related institutes and industries are directly subordinated to SSAU. However, it is not a united and centralized system immediately participating in all stages and details of space programs (like NASA in the United States). A special space force in the military of Ukraine is planned to launch by December 2025. The agency oversees launch vehicle and satellite programs, co-operative programs with the Russian Aviation and Space Agency, the European Space Agency, NASA, and commercial ventures. International participation includes Sea Launch and the Galileo positioning system.

== Space program ==
Development directions of space industry in Ukraine, 2000-2005

Space activities in Ukraine have been pursued over a 10-year span in strict accordance with National Space Programs. Each of them was intended to address the relevant current issues to preserve and further develop the space potential of Ukraine. The First Program (1993–1997) was called upon to keep up the research and industrial space-related potentiality for the benefit of the national economy and state security as well as to be able to break into the international market of space services. The Second Program (1998–2002) was aimed at creating an internal market of space services, conquering the international space markets by presenting in-house products and services (including launch complexes and spacecraft, space-acquired data, space system components) and integrating Ukraine into the worldwide space community.

The National Space Program of Ukraine for 2003-2007 (NSPU), which was adopted by the Verkhovna Rada of Ukraine (the Parliament of Ukraine) on October 24, 2002, outlines the main goals, assignments, priorities, and methods of maintaining space activity in Ukraine.

The Ukrainian Cabinet of Ministers announced its plans on 13 April 2007 to allocate 312 million euros to the National Space Program for 2007–2011.

Specific programs

- Scientific space research
- Remote sensing of the Earth
- Satellite telecommunication systems
- Development of ground-based infrastructure for navigation and special information system
- Space activities in the interests of national security and defense
- Space complexes
- Development of base elements and advanced space technologies
- Development of research, test and production base of the space sector

Goals of the program

- To develop a national system for Earth observation from outer space to meet the national demands in the social economic sphere and for security and defense purposes
- To introduce satellite systems and communication facilities into the telecommunication infrastructure of the state
- To obtain new fundamental knowledge on near-Earth outer space, the Solar System, deep space, biological and physical processes and the microgravity condition
- To create and develop techniques for space access with a view toward realizing national and international projects and to enable the home-made rocket to be employed on the worldwide market of space transportation services
- To elaborate the advanced space facilities
- To ensure the innovative development of the space sector in terms of improving its research, experimental and production basis

== History ==
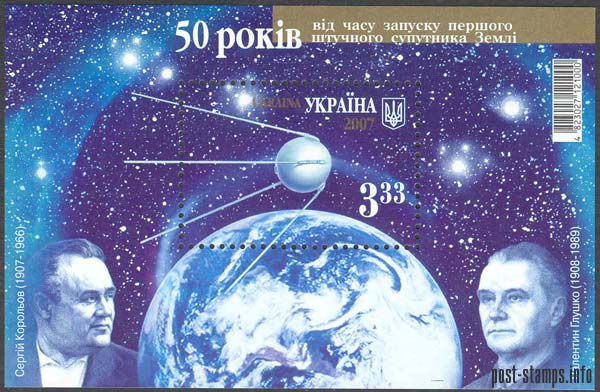
Sergei Korolev (left) and Valentin Glushko (right) on a 2007 Ukrainian stamp

The space industry of Ukraine started in 1937 when a group of scientists led by Heorhiy Proskura launched a large stratospheric rocket near Kharkiv. In 1954, the Soviet government transformed the car producer Yuzhmash (Dnipropetrovsk) into a rocket company. Since that time, the city of Dnipropetrovsk has been known in the Anglophone world as the Soviet Rocket City.

Prior to Ukraine's independence and the creation of the agency, many Ukrainians were active in spaceflight and Ukrainian spaceflight productions were instrumental in the Soviet space program. The agency is a minor descendant of the Soviet space program, most of which passed to the Russian Federal Space Agency. The agency took over all of the former Soviet defense industrial complex that was located on the territory of Ukraine.

A Message From Earth (AMFE) was sent by NSAU in October 2008 towards Gliese 581 c, a large terrestrial exoplanet orbiting the red dwarf star Gliese 581. The signal is a digital time capsule containing 501 messages.

The Ukrainian built RD-843 engine was used for the upper stage of the European Vega rocket. The first stage of the U.S. Antares rocket was developed by the Yuznoye SDO and produced by Yuzhmash.

On 8 March 2025, an employee of the Agency was arrested by SBU for alleged espionage on Ukrainian defense properties for Russia. He was tried under martial law and sentenced to the maximum 15 years in prison with confiscation of property.

== Launch capabilities ==
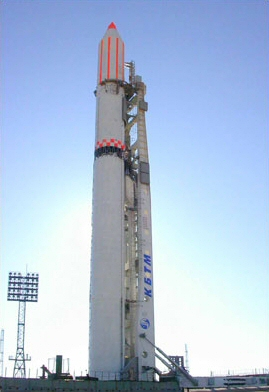
Zenit-2 rocket ready for launch

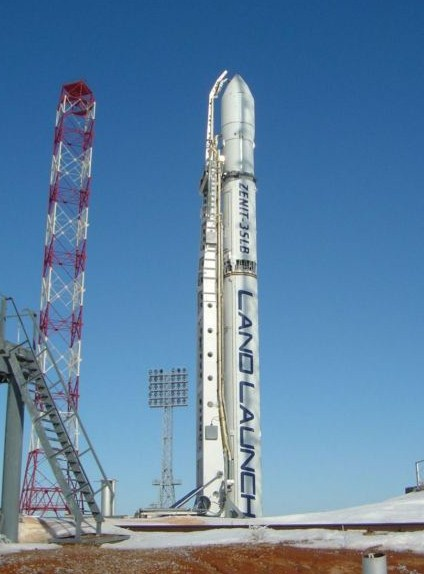
Zenit-3SLB

=== Launch vehicles ===
Ukraine continues further development and modernization of launch vehicles that were created during the Soviet period, primarily the Cyclone and the Zenith. There also was an attempt to redesign a former intercontinental ballistic missile as the Dnepr rocket. Almost all its launch vehicles are heavily dependent on Russian components. Between 1991 and 2007, a total of 97 launches of Ukrainian LV were conducted, including, but not limited to launches on the Sea Launch mobile launch pad. In 2006 Ukrainian launch vehicles accounted for 12% of all launches into space in the world. Ukrainian companies Yuzhnoye Design Office and Yuzhmash have engineered and produced seven types of launch vehicles.

==== Retired ====
- Tsyklon (ICBM-based 1967–1969) Baikonur, 8 launches (0 launches after 1991)
- Tsyklon-2 (ICBM-based 1969–2006) Baikonur, 106 launches (14 launches in 1991–2006)
- Tsyklon-3 (ICBM-based 1977–2009) Plesetsk, 122 launches (33 launches in 1991–2009)
- Zenit-2 (LRB 1985–2007) Baikonur, 37 launches (22 launches in 1991–2007)
- Zenit-2M
- Zenit-3SL (LRB 1999–2014) Sea Launch, 36 launches
- Zenit-3SLB (LRB 2008–2017) Baikonur, 11 launches
- Zenit-3F
- Dnepr (ICBM-based 1999–2015) Baikonur, 22 launches
- Antares (production and development of stage one core structure)

==== In development ====
- Mayak
- Cyclone-4M

=== Svityaz project ===
The Svityaz, Oril and Sura aerospace rocket complexes (ASRC) is intended for launching of various spacecraft (SC) into circular, elliptic and high-altitude circular, including the geostationary (GSO), orbits. Svityaz ASC represents a unique system that allows launch of spacecraft without utilization of complicated ground infrastructure. The Svityaz was to be launched directly from a modified version of An-225 Mriya, a Ukrainian airplane and airplane carrier that was the largest one in the world, prior to its destruction during attacks in 2022. The modified Mriya, that was to be used to carry Svityaz, was designated with the extension code of An-225-100. The aircraft is equipped with special devices to secure the LV above the fuselage. The operators and onboard equipment are located in the pressure-tight cabins. The Svityaz LV is being created on the basis of units, aggregates and systems of Zenit LV. It consists of three stages of non-toxic propellants: liquid oxygen and kerosene. The launch vehicle would be injected into the geostationary orbit using a solid-propellant apogee stage.

=== Sea Launch project ===
See more detailed article at Sea Launch

Sea Launch was a joint venture space transportation company, partially owned by companies in Ukraine which handle operations for the National Space Agency. Sea Launch offered a mobile sea platform, used for spacecraft launches of commercial payloads on specialized Ukrainian Zenit 3SL rockets. The main advantage of the floating cosmodrome is its placement directly on the equator. It allows taking the greatest advantage of Earth's rotation to deliver payloads into orbit at low expense.

Within the framework of the project the space rocket complex was developed, which consists of four components:

- marine segment
- rocket segment
- spacecraft segment, and
- facilities

Sea Launch mothballed its ships and put operations on long-term hiatus in 2014.

=== Spaceports ===
Ukraine does not have its own spaceports, but leases elsewhere.

- Baikonur Cosmodrome, Baikonur, Kazakhstan (under Russian administration)
- Plesetsk Cosmodrome, Arkhangelsk Oblast, Russia
- Dombarovsky Air Base, Orenburg Oblast, Russia
- Odyssey (launch platform) stationed in the Pacific near Kiribati
- Alcântara Launch Center, Maranhão, Brazil

== Satellites ==
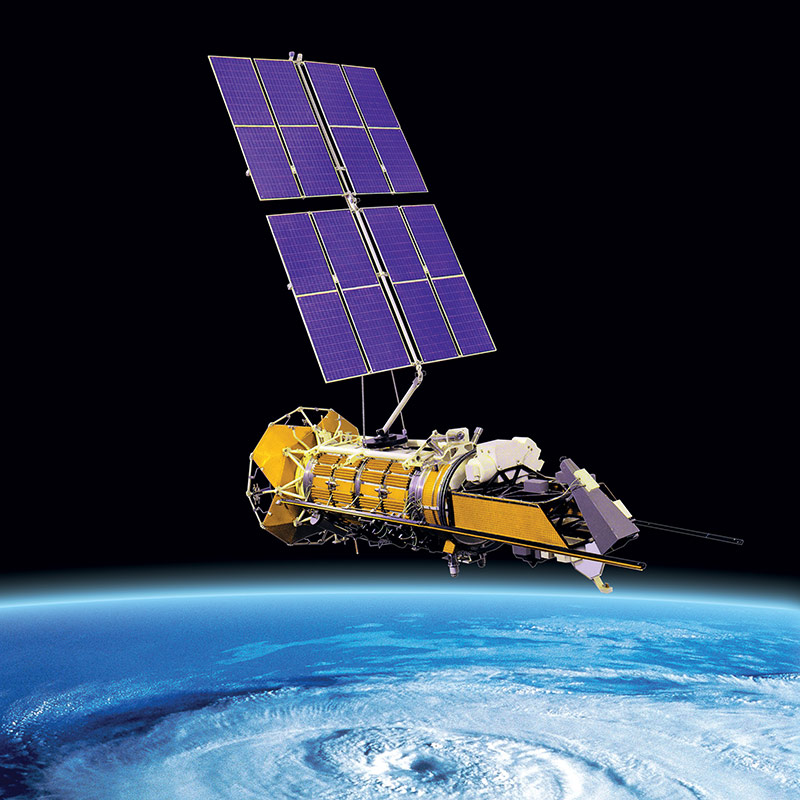
Okean-O

Ukraine produced the Sich satellite series and cooperated with Russia on the Okean-O Earth observation satellite and the Koronas-Foton solar observatory. As of 2011, SSAU was working on Sich-2M, Sich-3, Sich-3-O, Sich-3-P, Lybid M, and the Ukrselena lunar probe. The agency ended the Sich satellite program in 2026.

=== Launched ===
- 1995–2001: Sich-1 (Tsyklon-3 from Plesetsk)
- 1999–2000 Okean-O (Zenit-2 from Baikonur)
- 2004–2006: Sich-1M (Tsyklon-3 from Plesetsk)
- 2004–2007: MC-1-TK (Tsyklon-3 from Plesetsk)
- 2011–2012: Sich-2 (Dnepr from Dombarovskiy)
- 2014: PolyITAN-1 (CubeSat-type satellite by Dnepr from Dombarovskiy)
- 2017: PolyITAN-2 (CubeSat-type satellite by Atlas V from Cape Canaveral)
- 2022–2025: Sich-2-30 (Falcon 9 from Cape Canaveral)
- 2023: PolyITAN-HP-30 (CubeSat-type satellite by Falcon 9 from Cape Canaveral)

=== Cancelled ===
- Lybid 1
- Ionosat-Micro
- Sich-2M
- Ukrselena

== Human spaceflight ==
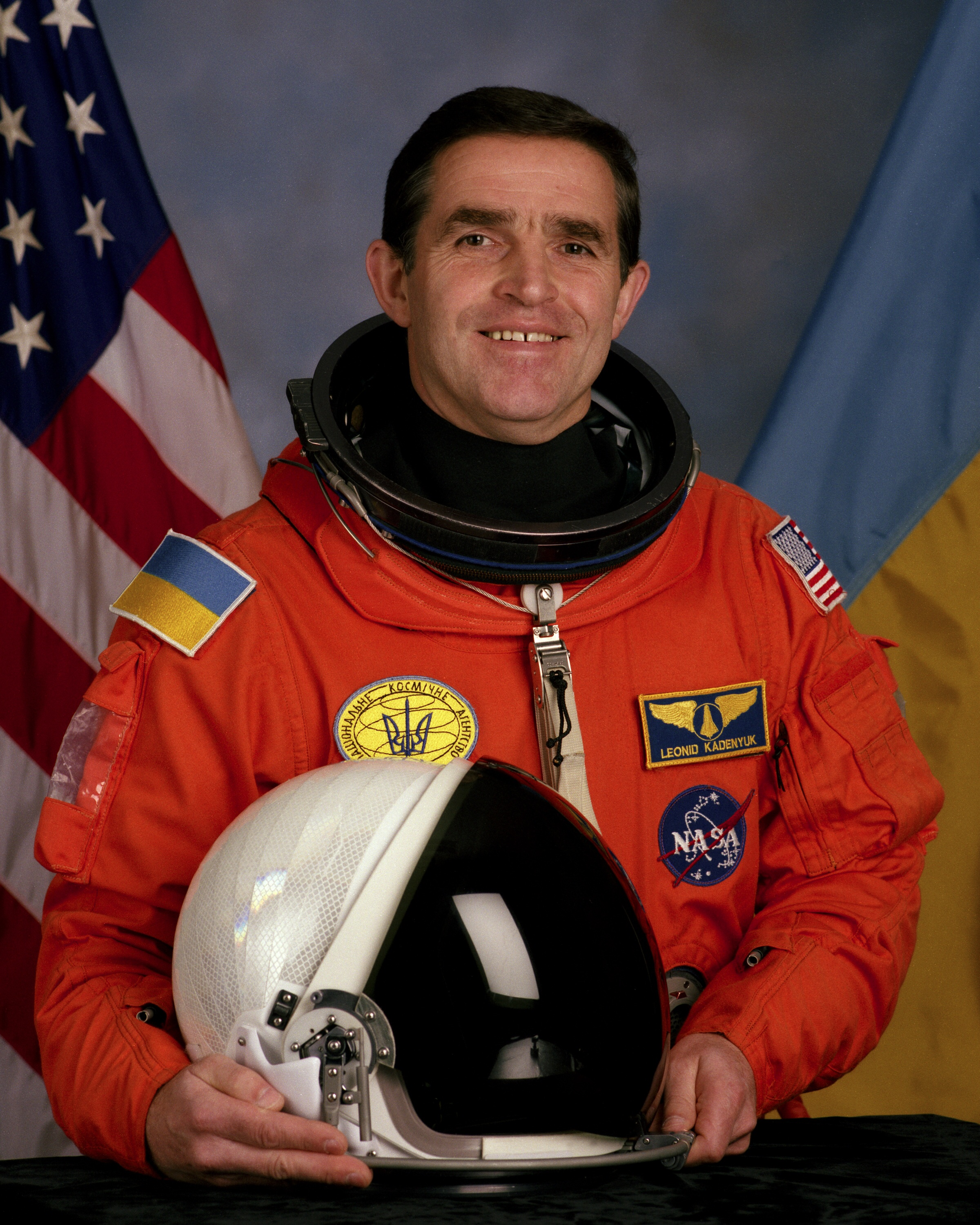
Leonid K. Kadenyuk, first astronaut from independent Ukraine

Prior to Ukraine's independence, several Ukrainians flew in space under the Soviet flag. Ukrainian Pavlo Popovych was the fourth cosmonaut in space, in 1962. The first Ukrainian to fly in space under the Ukrainian flag was Leonid K. Kadenyuk on 13 May 1997. He was a payload specialist on NASA's STS-87 Space Shuttle mission. It was an international spaceflight mission, involving crew members from USA, Ukraine, and Japan.

== Directors-General ==
- Volodymyr Horbulin (9 March 1992 – 12 August 1994)
- Andriy Zhalko-Titarenko (23 August 1994 – 9 March 1995)
- Oleksandr Nehoda (20 February 1995 – 25 July 2005)
- Yuriy Alekseyev (25 July 2005 – 11 February 2009)
- Oleksandr Zinchenko (11 February 2009 – 17 March 2010)
- Yuriy Alekseyev (17 March 2010 – 28 November 2014)
- Oleksandr Holub (16 October 2014 – 21 January 2015)
- Oleh Urusky (21 January – 19 August 2015)
- Liubomyr Sabadosh (19 August 2015 – 22 July 2016)
- Oleksandr Holub (25 July – 13 September 2016)
- Yuriy Radchenko (interim) (14 September 2016 – 31 August 2017)
- Pavlo Dehtyarenko (31 August 2017 – 3 November 2019)
- Volodymyr Mikheev (interim) (3 November 2019 – 24 January 2020)
- Volodymyr Usov (24 January – 16 November 2020)
- Mykhailo Lev (interim; 16 November 2020 – 23 February 2021)
- Volodymyr Taftay

== Ground complexes ==
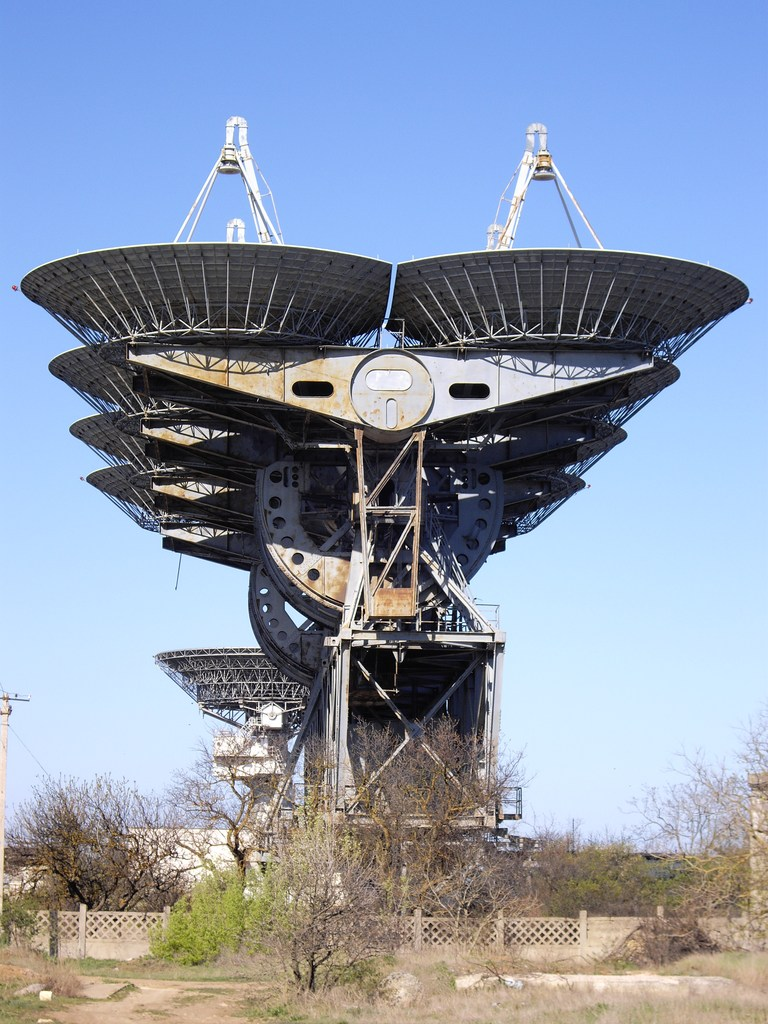
Tracking facilities in Yevpatoria (built by the Soviet Union in 1960)

- SSAU main special control center
- SSAU ground information complex
- SSAU ground control complex
- SSAU Space Monitoring and Analysis System
- SSAU remote telemetric stations
- SSAU ground-based broadcasting network of satellite television channels
- SSAU system of positioning and timing and navigation
- Pluton complex, temporarily inaccessible, due to Russian occupation

== National enterprises of the space industry ==
Most of the enterprises are located in Dnipro or Kyiv

Dnipro

- State Enterprise Makarov Yuzhny Machine-Building Plant (Yuzhmash)
- State Enterprise Yangel Yuzhnoye State Design Office
- State Enterprise "Dniprokosmos"
- State Enterprise "Dniprovsky Project Institute"
- Makarov National Center of aero-cosmic education for the youth
- State Enterprise "Center of rocket-space technology standardization"

Kyiv

- State Enterprise "Arsenal Factory"
- State Enterprise "Ukrkosmos"
- State Enterprise "Kyivprylad"
- State Enterprise "Scientific Center of a Precise Machine-building"
- State Joint-Stock Holding Company "Kyiv Radio Plant" (former Production Complex)
  - Open Joint-Stock Association "Kyiv Radio Plant"
  - Open Joint-Stock Association "RSB-Radio Plant"
  - Open Joint-Stock Association "SPC Kurs"
- State Scientific-Production Center "Pryroda"

Kharkiv

- Science-research technological institute of instrument-building (NDTIP)
- Public Stock Association "Khartron"
- Corporation Kommunar

Crimea

- National Space Facilities Control and Testing Center

== See also ==
- Lviv Centre of Institute for Space Research
- List of government space agencies
- National Space Facilities Control and Test Center
- Ukrainian Optical Facilities for Near-Earth Space Surveillance Network
