= Lebed =

Lebed means swan in several Slavic languages and may refer to:

== Places ==
- Lebed (river) in Siberia in eastern Russia
- Lebed, Bulgaria, a village in Kardzhali Province, Bulgaria
  - Lebed Point in Antarctica, named after Lebed, Bulgaria

== Aircraft ==
- Lebed class LCAC, a Soviet hovercraft
- Lebed XI, a Russian military reconnaissance aircraft
- Lebed XII, a Russian military reconnaissance aircraft

== Other uses ==
- Lebed (surname)

== See also ==
- Lybid (disambiguation)
