= Lybid (disambiguation) =

Lybid is a river in Ukraine.

Lybid (Ukrainian: Либідь) may also refer to:

- Sister of legendary Kyi, Shchek and Khoryv, founders of Kyiv
- Lybid 1, planned Ukrainian satellite

== See also ==
- Lebed (disambiguation)
- Lebid
