= Lybid 1 =

Planned Ukrainian telecommunications satellite

Lybid
- Mission type: Communications
- Operator: Ukrkosmos
- Website: https://www.ukrkosmos.com/project-main/libyd/
- Mission duration: 15 years (planned)

Spacecraft properties
- Bus: Ekspress
- Manufacturer: MacDonald, Dettwiler and Associates, ISS Reshetnev
- Launch mass: 1,200 kilograms (2,600 lb)
- Power: 3 kWt

Start of mission
- Launch date: TBD
- Rocket: Zenit-3F / Fregat-SB
- Launch site: Baikonur
- Contractor: Roscosmos

Orbital parameters
- Reference system: Geocentric
- Regime: Geostationary

Transponders
- Band: 24 Ku band
- Coverage area: Eastern Europe, parts of Asia, and the Middle East

Lybid (Ukrainian: Либідь) was a planned Ukrainian geostationary telecommunications satellite designed as part of the National Satellite System of Ukraine.

== History ==
The launch of the satellite has been repeatedly postponed (since 2011) due to various problems including: financial mismanagement, corrupt officials stealing project funds, unmet obligations to contractors and lenders, the loss of a rocket engine that went missing in transit under suspicious circumstances, and the loss of control over the satellite control center in Yevpatoria due to the Russian annexation of Crimea.

At the end of 2019, Volodymyr Usov, the newly appointed head of the State Space Agency of Ukraine, said the project most likely will be closed. In an interview conducted in April 2021, Usov said that the Agency was still looking for an investor to facilitate the completion of the project without additional funds from the state budget.

At the time of the 2022 Russian invasion of Ukraine, the satellite was stored in Russia and the project was considered cancelled.

== Mission ==
The satellite is intended to provide services of regional and foreign television and radio broadcasting, direct television broadcasting, the provision of multimedia and Internet services, as well as data transmission, telephony, video conferencing and the Internet, based on VSAT. Satellite coverage includes Eastern Europe, parts of Asia, and the Middle East. The spacecraft will have 24 Ku-band transponders installed. The power of each transponder would be 100–110 watts.

== Manufacturers ==
The main contractor and developer of the payload is a Canadian company MacDonald, Dettwiler and Associates Ltd. (MDA). JSC Information Satellite Systems Reshetnev was a subcontractor.

== See also ==
- Space program of Ukraine
