= Lebid =

Lebid (Ukrainian: Лебідь) is a surname meaning "swan" in Ukrainian. It may refer to:

- Anatoliy Lebid (born 1944), Soviet footballer
- Mykola Lebid (1936–2007), Ukrainian painter
- Serhiy Lebid (born 1975), Ukrainian long-distance runner

== See also ==
- Lebed (surname)
- Lybid
