= National Space Facilities Control and Test Center =

- Національний центр управління та випробувань космічних засобів

Agency overview
- Formed: August 12, 1996
- Type: Space agency
- Headquarters: Kyiv, Ukraine
- Administrator: Volodymyr Prysiazhnyi
- Website: spacecenter.gov.ua

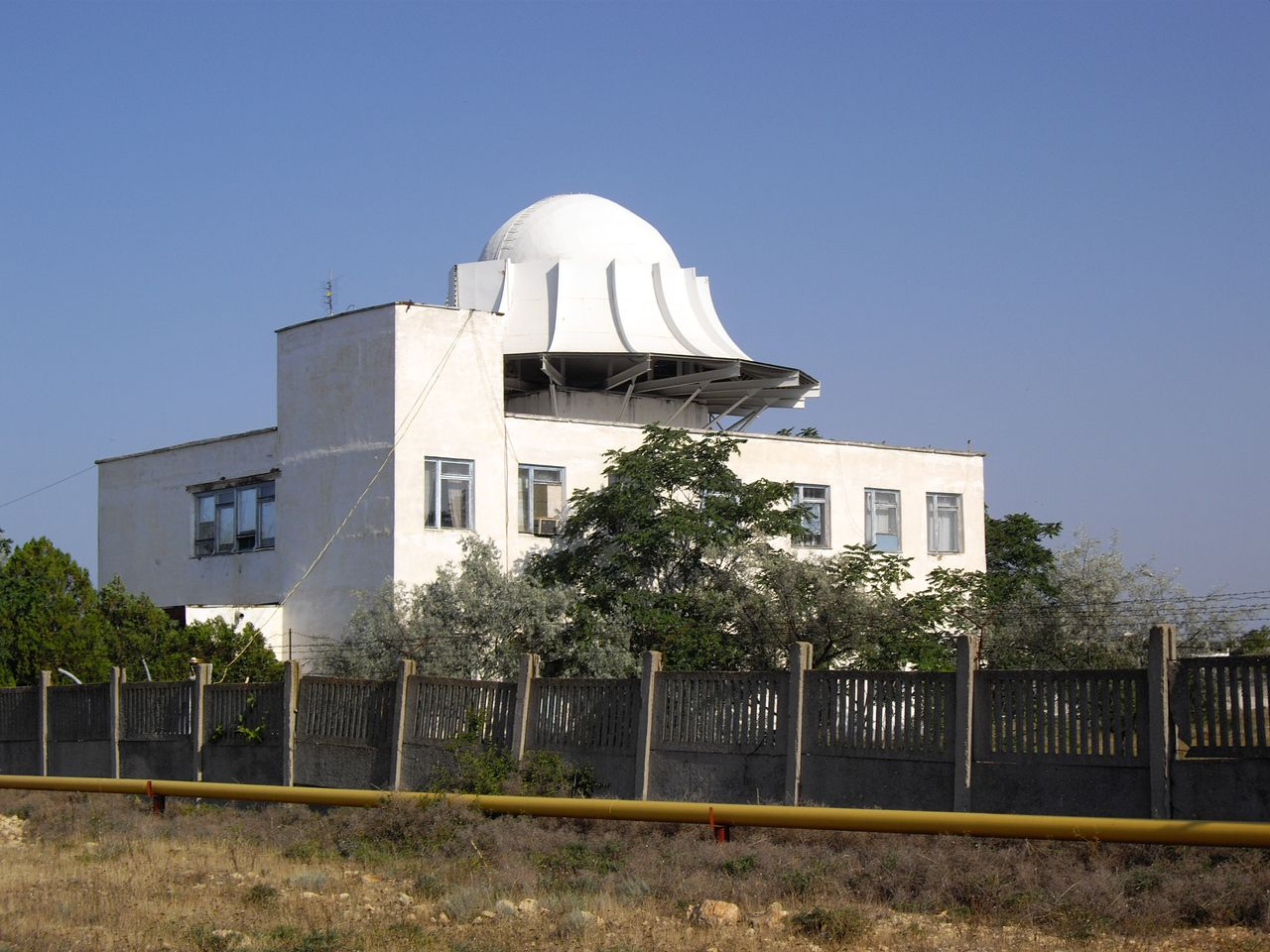
ATZ-28 ("Bolshaya Sazhen")

The National Space Facilities Control and Test Center (Ukrainian: Національний центр управління та випробувань космічних засобів, НЦУВКЗ, romanized: Natsionalnyi tsentr upravlinnia ta vyprobuvan kosmichnykh zasobiv, NCUVKZ) is a Ukrainian state institution subordinate to the State Space Agency of Ukraine that manages space flight operations, deep space research using its own technical facilities, space monitoring, geophysical monitoring, and testing of space technology. After the annexation of Crimea, the headquarters of the center (at one time called the Yevpatoria Deep Space Communications Center) moved from Yevpatoria to Kyiv.

== Mission ==
The NCUVKZ participates in the implementation of research and development in the field of creating rocket and space technology and special equipment in the interests of national security and defense, the development of the economy of Ukraine, as well as in the execution of separate scientific projects and studies aimed at improving the functioning of the NCUVKZ within the framework of state-targeted scientific and technical programs

== History ==
=== In Crimea in Soviet era ===
In 1960, the center's facilities were established on a coastal plain near the city of Yevpatoria in Crimea. The technical basis of the center was the space radio complex Pluton, which was equipped with unique antennas that had no world analogues. For the first twenty years of the Soviet space era, interplanetary flight management was carried out exclusively from Yevpatoria.

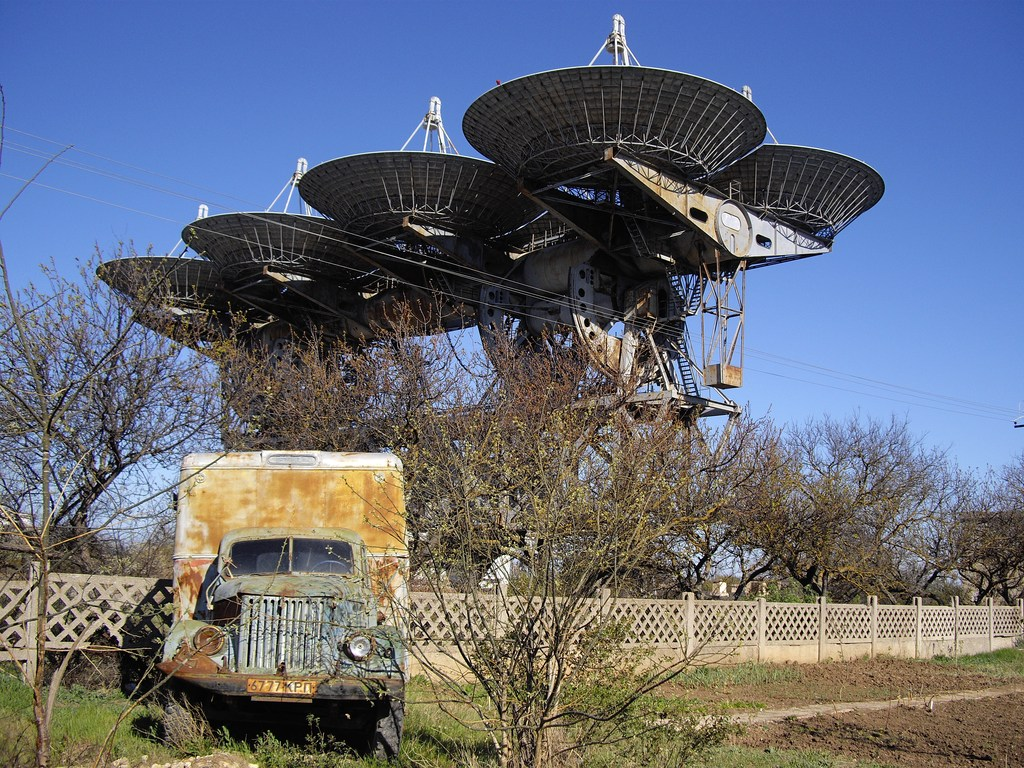
Pluton antenna at South Station in 2009 (since removed)

On February 12, 1961, the Deep Space Communications Center began managing the flight of the world's first automatic interplanetary station Venera 1. In 1965, the Venera 2 and Venera 3 spacecraft were launched. Subsequently, a series of space vehicles of the Luna, Venera, and Mars series were launched, during which flight dynamics and landing on the planets of the Solar System, studying the atmospheres of planets, and transmitting information were tested. Specialists of the Deep Space Communications Center constantly managed the work of spacecraft, receiving operational and scientific information.

The long-term experience in managing automatic interplanetary stations, operating deep space ground stations, achievements in the fields of electronics, informatics, radio engineering, mechanical engineering and other areas of science and production made it possible to create a research complex—the radio astronomical telescope RT-70. Since December 1978, the RT-70 of the Deep Space Communications Center in Yevpatoria has been a permanent participant in the implementation of deep space research programs.

=== Post-Soviet Ukrainian control ===
On August 31, 1995, at 10:50 a.m., the launch of the Cyclone-3 launch vehicle took place, which placed the first Ukrainian national satellite Sich-1 into orbit, designed for the operational acquisition of information to address the tasks of Earth observation from space. The team of the Deep Space Communications Center, during the management of the Sich-1 spacecraft, carried out a number of scientific experiments.

In 1996, according to the Decree of the President of Ukraine, the National Center for Control and Testing of Space Vehicles (NCUVKZ) was established in Yevpatoria, based on the Deep Space Communications Center. The center is designed to operate spacecraft in national and international space programs.

The NCUVKZ comprises four branches: the Center for Receiving and Processing Special Information and Control of the Navigation Field, the Main Special Control Center, the Western Radio Engineering Observation Center at Mukachevo, and the Dnipro branch of the NCUVKZ "Dniprocosmos," whose capabilities fully meet the tasks assigned to the center.

=== After Russia annexed Crimea ===
With the Russian annexation of Crimea in 2014, all technical facilities of the Deep Space Communications Center in the village of Vityne (near Yevpatoria) became part of Russian-occupied Crimea. To restore operational control over the National Center and its branches, the leadership of the State Space Agency of Ukraine relocated the headquarters of the NCUVKZ to Kyiv that year. Currently, the purpose of the NCUVKZ is to comprehensively support the development of Ukraine's space industry, implement the measures of the National Target Scientific and Technical Space Program in cooperation with the State Space Agency of Ukraine in the interests of national security and defense, the economy of the state, and to meet the needs of the people of Ukraine.

In August 2018, the NCUVKZ tendered for modernization of the Western Radio Engineering Observation Center (formerly the Dnipro over-the-horizon radar, which was used in the missile defense system of the former USSR).

In the future, the resources of the NCUVKZ may be used to carry out tasks such as ensuring the provision of satellite communication and data relay services, coordinate-time and navigation support, monitoring and analyzing the space environment on request of government agencies; guaranteed and operational provision of information obtained from remote sensing satellites, and technical support for the creation of modern technologies for its special use, the creation of multifunctional technical facilities.

On December 20, 2023, at 05:00, a missile strike at the former location of the Deep Space Communications Center near Yevpatoria damaged Russian military equipment.

== Photos ==
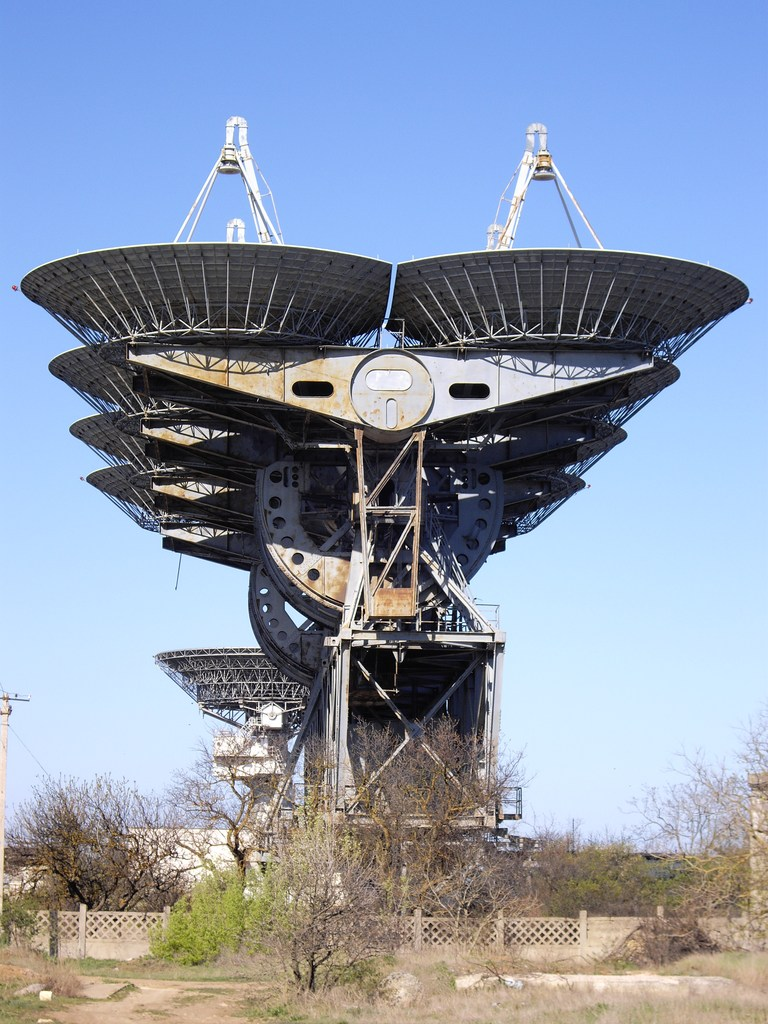
ADU-1000

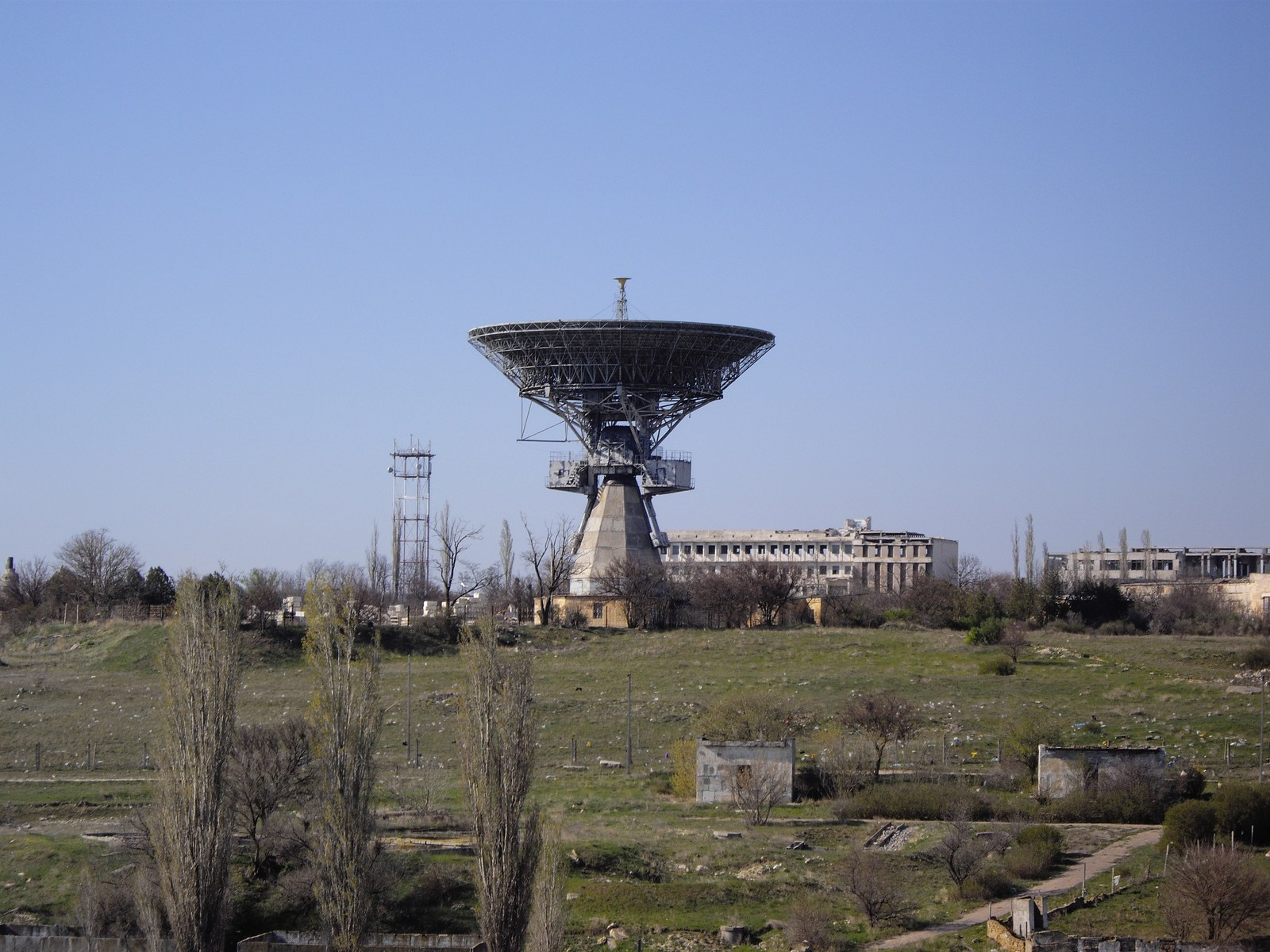
TNA-400

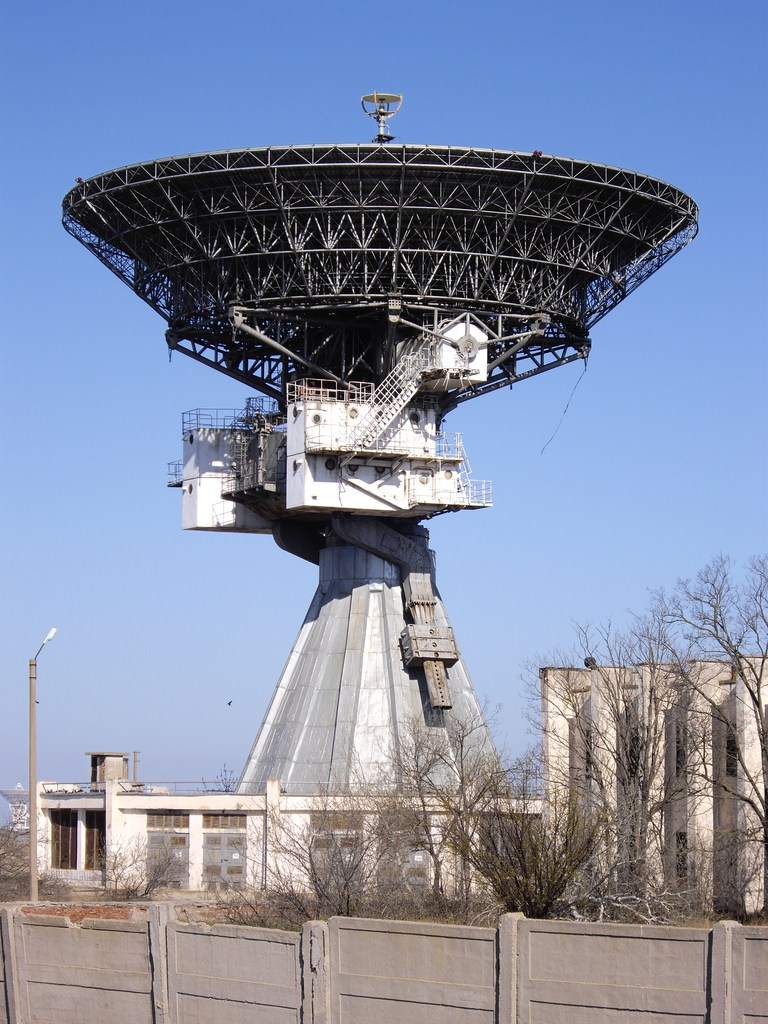
P-400

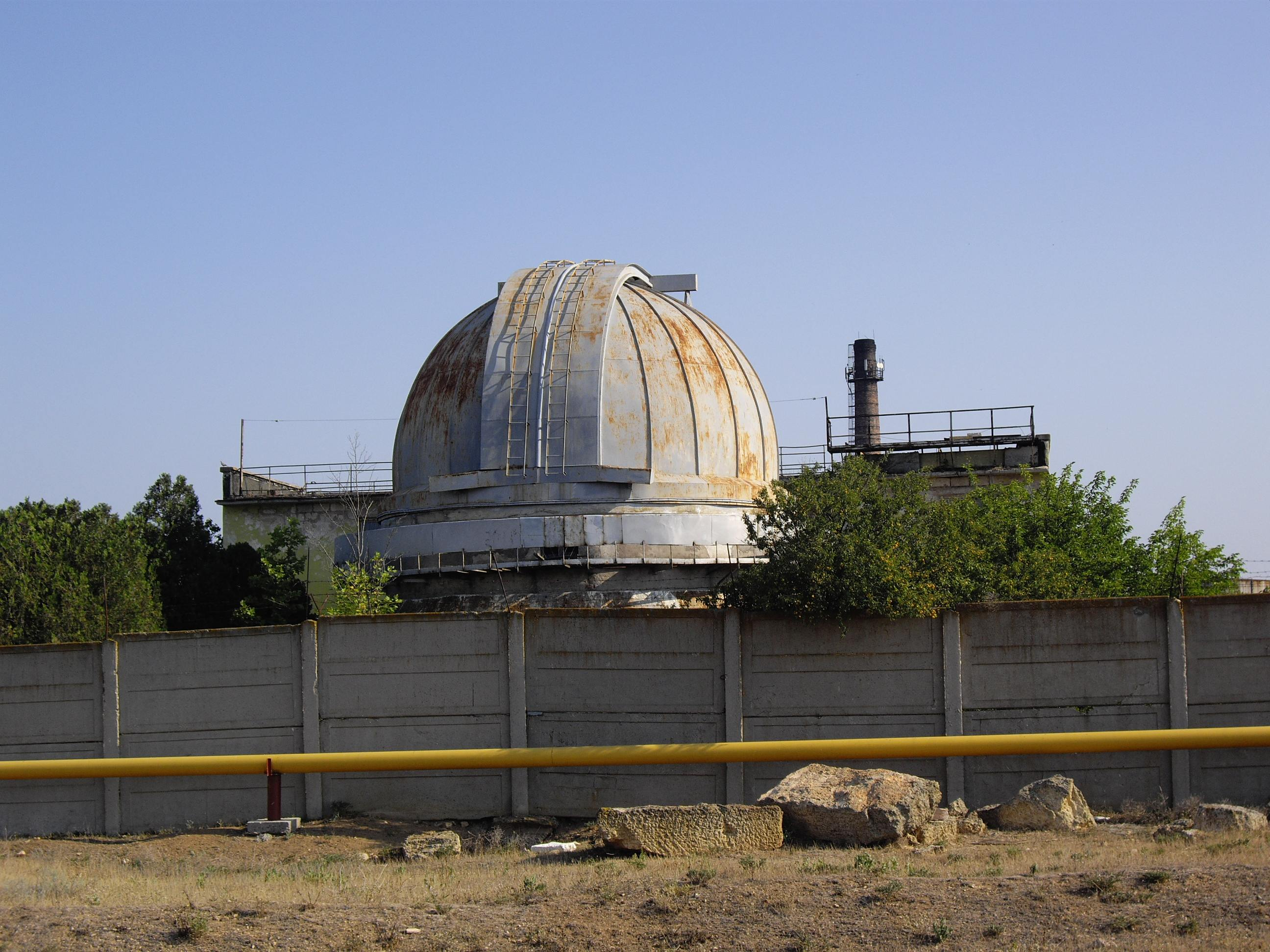
ATZ-8

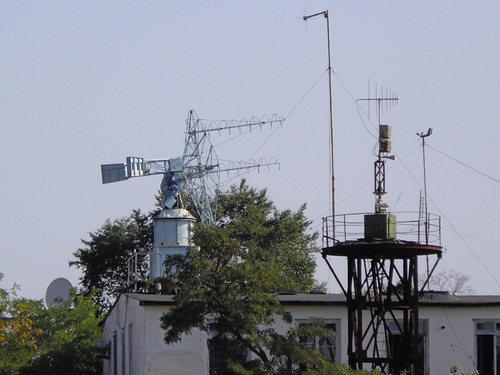

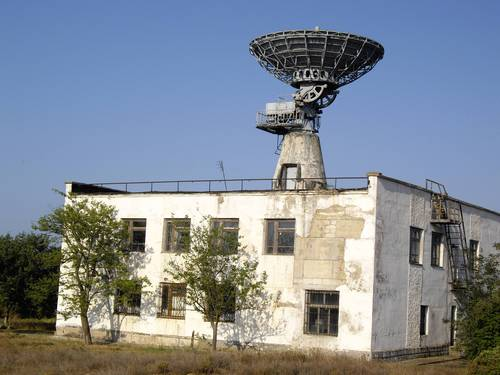

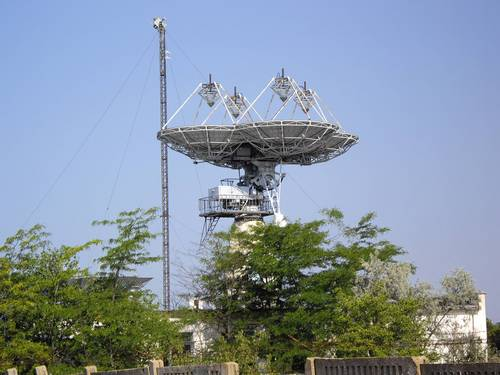

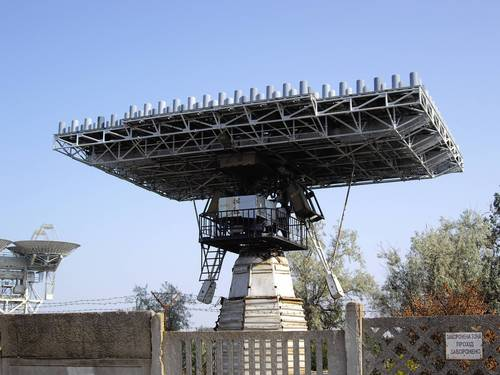

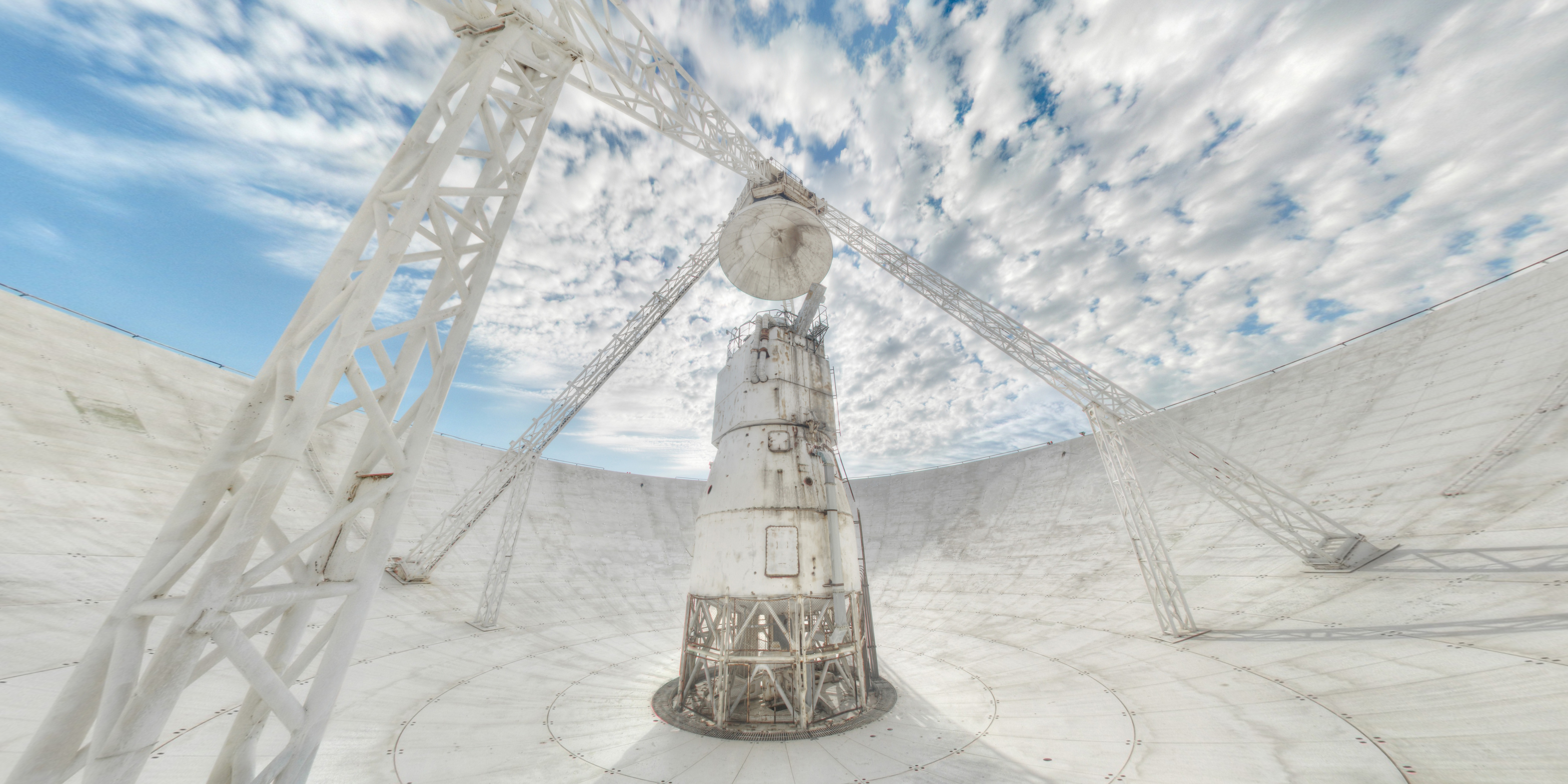
Inside the antenna mirror of the radio telescope RT-70

== Sources ==
- "National Center for Control and Testing of Space Vehicles". National Space Agency of Ukraine. Archived from the original on 2013-06-25.
- "Military Space of Ukraine". mil.in.ua. Ukrainian Military Portal. 2017-12-12.
- "Ukraine will pay for the use of foreign satellites". mil.in.ua. Ukrainian Military Portal. 2018-08-05.
