= Mykhailo Lev =

Ukrainian politician

- Михайло Олександрович Лев
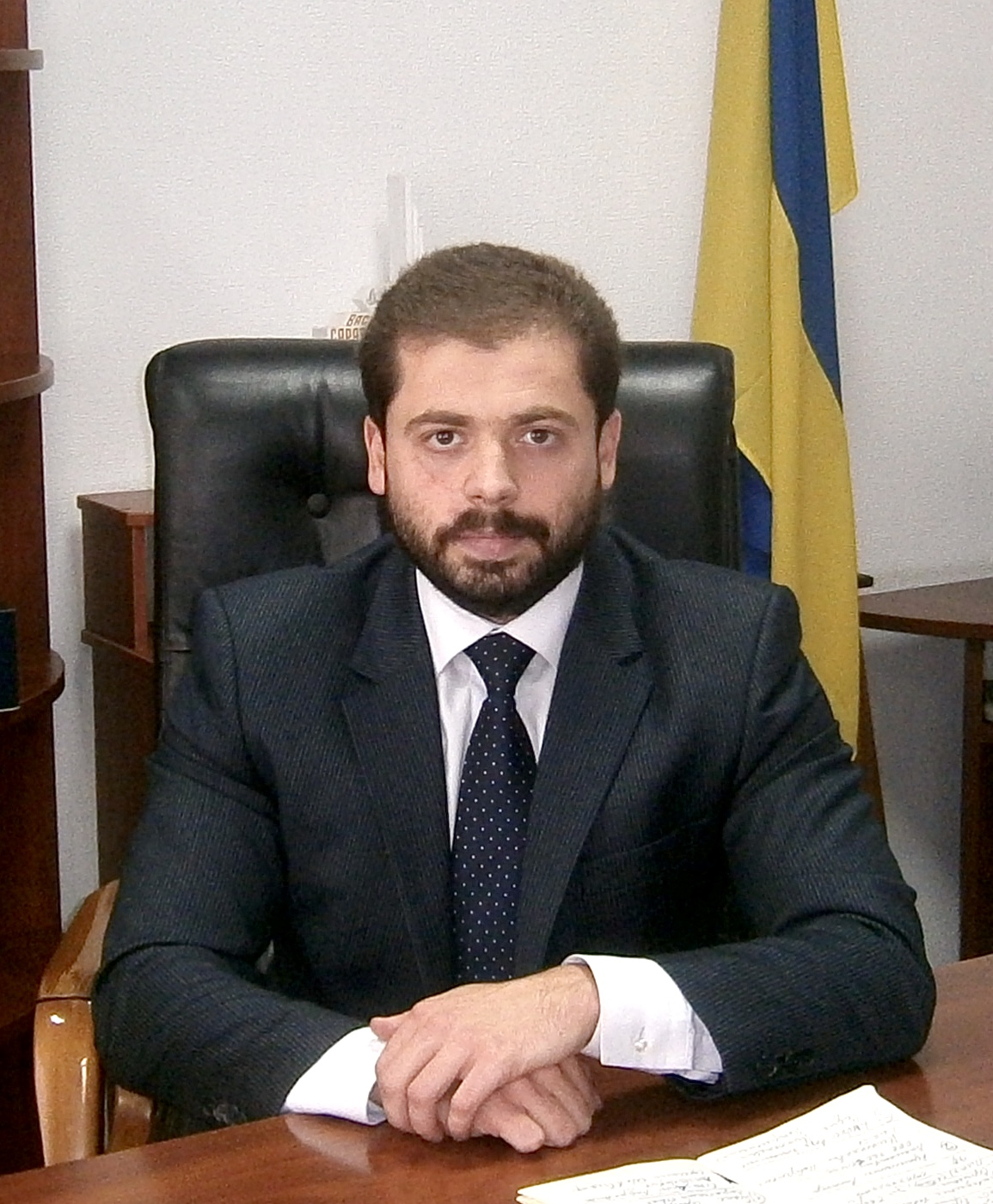
- Mykhailo Lev

former Head of State Space Agency of Ukraine ad interim
- In office 16 November 2020 -2021

Personal details
- Born: Mykhailo Oleksandrovych Lev; 9 October 1987 (age 38) Luhansk, Ukraine
- Citizenship: Ukraine
- Education: Taras Shevchenko National University of Kyiv

Mykhailo Lev (Ukrainian: Лев Михайло Олександрович; born 9 October 1987, Luhansk) is the former acting Head of the State Space Agency of Ukraine, lawyer, public and political figure, Head of Sarata Raion State Administration of Odesa Oblast during 2015–2017.

== Education ==
- 2010-2011 - Trinity College Dublin (Ireland) Master of Laws (LL.M). Master's thesis on: “Ukrainian rules on the recognition and enforcement of foreign judgments in civil and commercial matters aligning with European”
- 2008-2011 - Taras Shevchenko National University of Kyiv, Institute of International Relations, Kyiv, Ukraine; International Economic Relations (extramural). Specialist Degree. Qualification of an International Economist.
- 2008-2010 - Taras Shevchenko National University of Kyiv, Institute of International Relations, Kyiv, Ukraine; International Law. Master's degree. Qualification of an International Lawyer, Interpreter from English.
- 2004-2008 - Taras Shevchenko National University of Kyiv, Institute of International Relations, Kyiv, Ukraine; International Law. Bachelor's degree. Qualification of a Specialist of International Law

== Professional and public experience ==
Prior to 2020 has been co-founder and member of the board of Community Organization "Sklyk", Executive Officer of Community Organization "The Initiative of Real Action", Head of the Board of Community Organization "The Center for Political and Legal Studies". In 2016 won the competition for a vacancy of a Deputy Head - Head of Odesa Region State Administration Apparatus.

- 2020 – acting Head of the State Space Agency of Ukraine,
- 2020 – the First Deputy Head of the State Space Agency of Ukraine.
- 2017-2020 - Head of the board of Community Organization "The Center for Political and Legal Studies".
- 2015-2017 - Head of Sarata District State Administration of Odesa region.
- 2012-2013 - Assistant Consultant to People's Deputy of Ukraine.
- 2012-2020 - Practice of Law (Advocacy).
- 2007-2012 - Legal practice in the private sector.

== Public activities ==
=== Great political reform ===
On September 7, 2017, at a briefing in the Verkhovna Rada (the parliament of Ukraine), the creation of the socio-political movement (NGO) "The Initiative of Real Action" was announced with Mykhailo Lev being its executive director.

By the initiative of "The Initiative of Real Action", together with partners from other NGOs who lobbied the adoption of the law on the Anti-Corruption Court and electoral reform, it was decided to hold a campaign on October 17, called "Great Political Reform", and included three key requirements :

- Restriction of parliamentary immunity (Draft law No. 6773);
- Open voter lists (Draft law No. 1068-2);
- Establishment of the Anti-Corruption Court.

Various meetings in the cities of Ukraine were also held as part of the campaign.

Campaign results:

- 3, October, 2017 - the Conciliation Council of the Verkhovna Rada managed to get the Draft laws on the restriction of parliamentary immunity (No.6773) and on the establishment of an anti-corruption court (No.6011) on the agenda of the session;
- 17, October - during the Campaign itself, the Chairman of the Verkhovna Rada Andriy Parubiy instructed the special committee to urgently consider the Draft law on the restriction of parliamentary immunity;
- 19, October - the Verkhovna Rada transferred Draft law on the restriction of parliamentary immunity No.6773 by 328 votes to the Constitutional Court of Ukraine to obtain an opinion on its accordance with the constitutionality of Ukraine, as required by the procedure.

As to this day, all three requirements have been implemented by the Ukrainian Government.

=== National Unity Coalition SPILNO ===
Created in December 2018, the National Coalition Coalition SPILNO (a member of which was Mykhailo Lev) aimed to provide a communication platform for democratic leaders and support those who were thought to win the 2019 presidential election.

One of the key initiatives was the signing of a memorandum, according to which, after conducting a poll, the optimal candidate for the presidential election was determined. The rest of those who signed the memorandum, would withdraw their candidacies from the elections.

During the election campaign, Andriy Sadovyi, Dmytro Gnap, Viktor Chumak, Michel Tereshchenko, Dmytro Dobrodomov and others withdrew their candidacies in favor of Anatoliy Hrytsenko. In the election Hrytsenko did not proceed to the second round of the election; in the first round he placed fifth with 6.91% of the votes.

== Political activity ==
=== Head of the Sarata Raion State Administration ===
- Increased the consolidated budget of the district by 70%;
- Restored of the presence of the Armed Forces of Ukraine in the Bessarabian region: units of the land forces and coastal defense of the Ukrainian Navy;
- After the inventory of agricultural land in the budgets of city councils added more than ₴18.5 million per year;
- Established local Center of Provision of Administrative Services;
- Increased the funding for repair work in medical institutions by 700% compared to 2015;
- Purchased equipment for medical institutions of the district 3.7 times more than for the same period in 2015;
- Increased funding for repair work in educational institutions 3 times more than for the same period in 2015
- Significantly improved the material and technical base of educational institutions of the district - 11.3 times increased funding;
- Increased the funding of repair works in cultural institutions 26 times compared to 2015;
- Purchased equipment for cultural institutions of the district 21 times more than for the same period in 2015;
- Fostered informatization of district libraries, replenishment of the book fund.

== Selected works ==
Publication in scientific journal of the Uzhhorod National University. "The Theoretical Concept of Recognition and Enforcement of Foreign Judgments". "Legal" Series, Iss. 21. – P. ІІ, V 1. – Uzhhorod: 2013. – p. 224-228.

Publication in journal of the Kyiv University of Law. "Understanding of Recognition of Foreign Judgment in Private International Law". Kyiv. – 2013/2. – P. 378-381
