= Morse Message (1962) =

Radio message broadcast to Venus in 1962

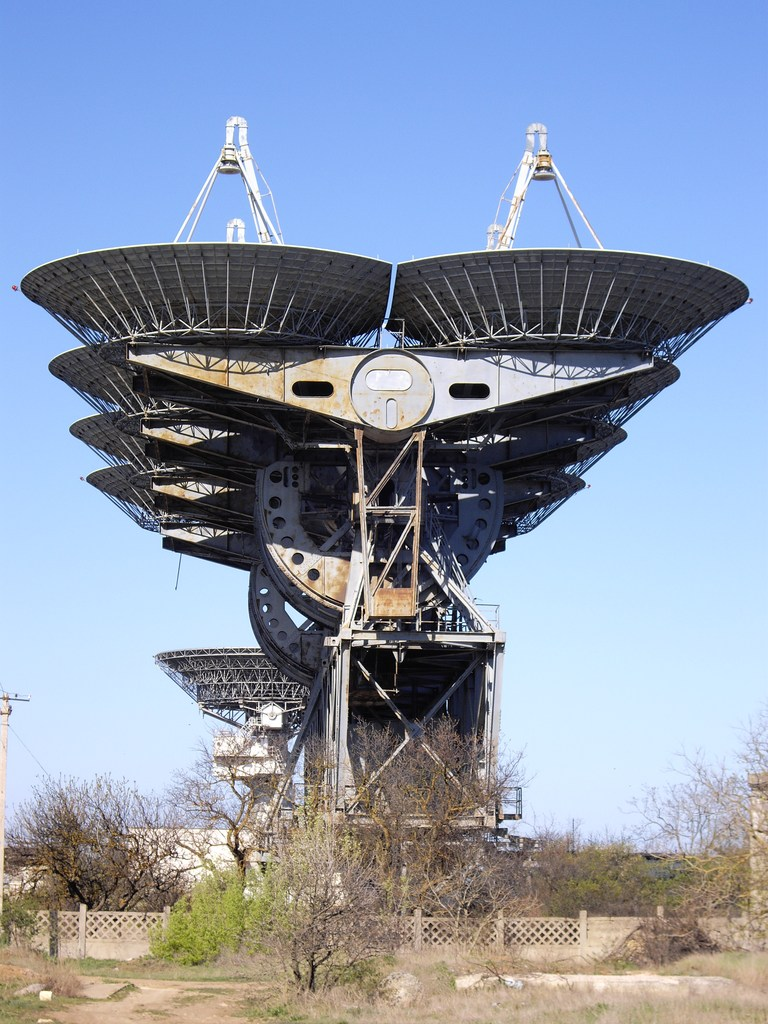
The first Soviet Planetary Radar, built in 1960, which sent the message in 1962. It is located in the Crimean town of Yevpatoria (Jevpatorija), Ukraine (then the Ukrainian Soviet Socialist Republic).

The Morse Message was a series of brief radio messages in Russian Morse code that were transmitted from the Evpatoria Planetary Radar (EPR) complex and directed to the planet Venus in 1962.

The message consisted of three words, all encoded in Morse code: the word “Mir” (Russian: “Мир”, meaning both “peace” and “world”) was transmitted from the EPR on November 19, 1962, and the words “Lenin” (Russian: “Ленин”) and “USSR” (Russian: “СССР”, the abbreviation for the Soviet Union — Russian: Сою́з Сове́тских Социалисти́ческих Респу́блик, Soyúz Soviétskikh Sotsialistícheskikh Respúblik) were transmitted on November 24, 1962. In Russian, the Morse Message is referred to as the Radio Message “MIR, LENIN, USSR”.

The message was used to test the radar station (though not for measuring the distance to Venus, since the EPR relied on a different technology, a coherent waveform with frequency manipulation, for distance measurements). The signals reflected off the surface of Venus and were received back on Earth 4 minutes, 32.7 seconds and 4 minutes, 44.7 seconds later (for the November 19 and November 24 broadcasts, respectively).

The signals are currently in transit to the star HD 131336

== See also ==
- List of interstellar radio messages
