= MK-1TS =

MK-1TS Micron
- COSPAR ID: 2004-052C
- SATCAT no.: 28507

Start of mission
- Launch date: 24 December 2004

End of mission
- Decay date: 30 September 2005

MK-1TS Micron (Ukrainian: МС-1-ТК Мікрон) was a small Ukrainian microsatellite manufactured by Yuzhmash. MK-1TS was launched on 24 December 2004, at 13:20 from the Plesetsk cosmodrome using a Cyclone-3 launch vehicle together with the Sich-1M satellite. Both satellites were placed into incorrect orbits due to premature third stage cutoff. MK-1TS had a small on-board camera (MBTC-VD), to provide digital optical-electronic images in the panchromatic range. One of its tasks was to work out a new system of orientation on the base of a magnetometer and electromagnets without using auxiliary devices. The satellite remained active until 30 September 2005.
