= Ionosat-Micro =

Ukrainian satellite mission

- Mission type: Ionosphere research
- Operator: State Space Agency of Ukraine
- Website: ionosat-micro.ikd.kiev.ua/en

Spacecraft properties
- Spacecraft: "Mikrosat-M"
- Manufacturer: Yuzhnoye State Design Office
- Launch mass: 200 kilograms (440 lb)
- Payload mass: 75 kilograms (165 lb)

Orbital parameters
- Reference system: Circular Solar-synchronous
- Regime: Low Earth
- Inclination: 97,9…98,2°
- Argument of periapsis: 620–710 kilometres (390–440 mi)
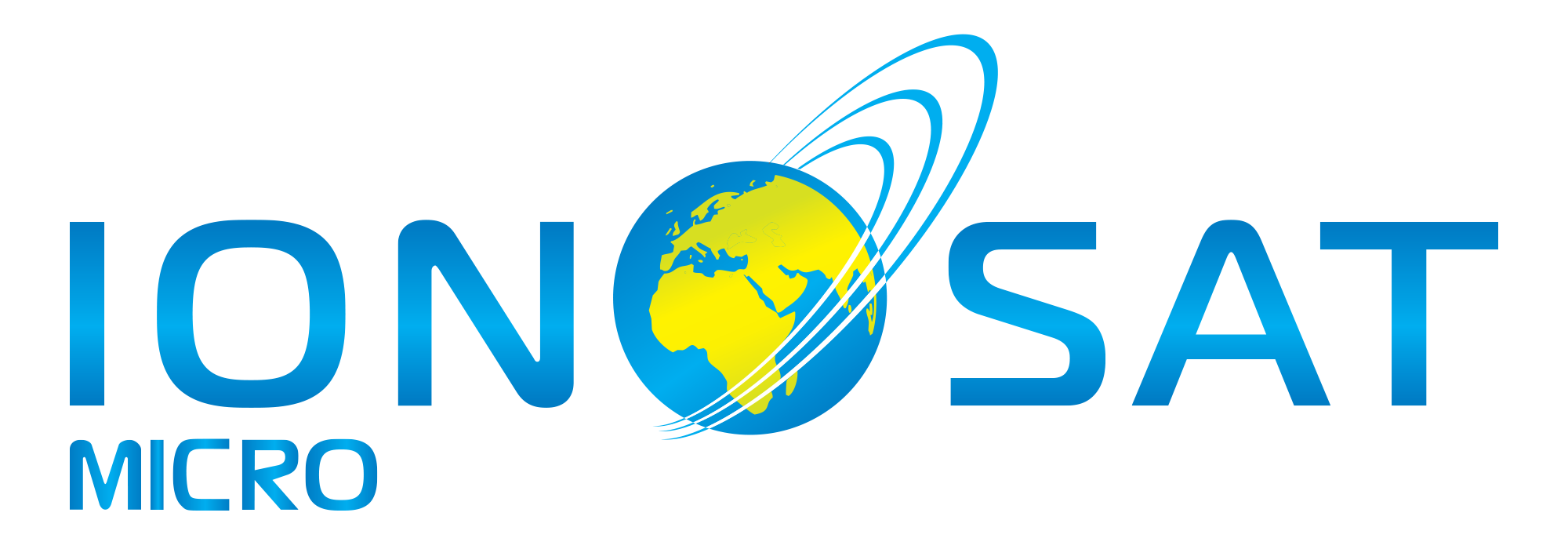

Ionosat-Micro was a Ukrainian satellite project lead the Space Research Institute of NAS of Ukraine and SSA of Ukraine. The mission was being realized under the National purpose scientific and technical space program of Ukraine. The project was terminated in the 2020s.

== History ==
Formation of the scientific objectives of the project Ionosat-Micro was for a long time, and conceptual provisions were first formulated in the 1990s, during the development of unrealized mission "Warning." Then, after tragic Spitakskii earthquake (1988), the political leadership of the USSR initiated the development of new, more effective methods of earthquake prediction, based, in particular, on the use of non-traditional for Seismology approaches such as observation of ionospheric harbingers of earthquakes etc. Thus arose the idea of mission "Warning", which could be the most ambitious satellite project in the history of studies of the ionosphere.

For the diagnosis of electromagnetic processes in ionospheric plasma in the Ionosat-Micro Mission will be used complex instrument MWC, developed by Lviv Centre of Space Research Institute. Experimental testing elements MWC was conducted space experiments "Variant" in the Ukrainian remote sensing satellite Sich-1M (2004). To measure the parameters of the ionosphere gas, concentration and temperature neutral and ionized gases, is a complex instrument DN - DE, established in Institute of Technical Mechanics. Flight testing sensors DN and DE experiment was carried out in "Potential" in the Ukrainian remote sensing satellite Sich-2 (2012).

The satellite's launch was planned for 2018. As of May 2019, work on the project continued. Work on the project stopped after the 2022 Russian invasion of Ukraine and in 2026, the Space Research Institute of the National Academy of Sciences of Ukraine considered the project terminated.

== Project partners ==
Organizationation	Part in the project
UKRAINE
Space Research Institute of National Academy of Sciences of Ukraine and State Space Agency of Ukraine (SRI), Kyiv	Coordination of research program. Maintenance of functioning of the Data processing, storage and distribution center PROMIS
Yuzhnoye State Design Office, Dnipro	Spacecraft «Microsat-M» designing and launch, payload integration, spacecraft operation planning, formation of accompanying information on spacecraft parameters
Lviv Centre of Space Research Institute, Lviv	Onboard scientific instrumentation integration. Creation of instruments: MWC, ODHS and electronic unit of PDA. Measurement realization and data processing
Institute of Technical Mechanics, Dnipro	DN and DE sensors creation, measurement realization and data processing
National Center of Space Facilities Control and Test	Flight control. Telemetry and scientific information receiving from the spacecraft
POLAND
Space Research Center, Warsaw	Instrument RFA creation, measurement realization and data processing
BULGARIA
Space Research and Technology Institute, Sofia	Instrument ID-2 creation, measurement realization and data processing

== Spacecraft ==
Ionosat-Micro scientific instrumentation set is installed on the satellite platform Microsat-M designed by Yuzhnoye State Design Office to conduct scientific and technological experiments. Ideas for the satellite launching into orbit are processed.

ORBIT
Circular, the operating range of heights	620...710 km
Inclination	97,9...98,2°
Solar-synchronous, local time in a descending node	10...14 hours
ORIENTATION
type	active three axes
orientation error in the orbital coordinate system	not more than 5° (3σ)
angular rate of spacecraft stabilization	not more than 0,01 °/с (3σ)
DATA TRANSMISSION TO THE EARTH
X-range radio line	30.72 Mbit/s
S-range service radio line	32 kbit/s
SPACECRAFT WEIGHT
total	up to 200 kg
payload	up to 75 ky
WARRANTY PERIOD
not less than 3 years
SPACE AND TIME MEASUREMENTS ERRORS
spacecraft positioning error	not more than 1.5 km
spacecraft orientation error (sensors axes)	not more than 1°
onboard time scale error	not more than 1 msec

== Scientific instruments ==
General characteristics of Ionosat-Micro scientific instrumentation set:

- weight < 20 kg
- power consumption < 51 W
- data downstream up to 6 GB per day
