= Pluton (complex) =

System of deep space communications and planetary radar

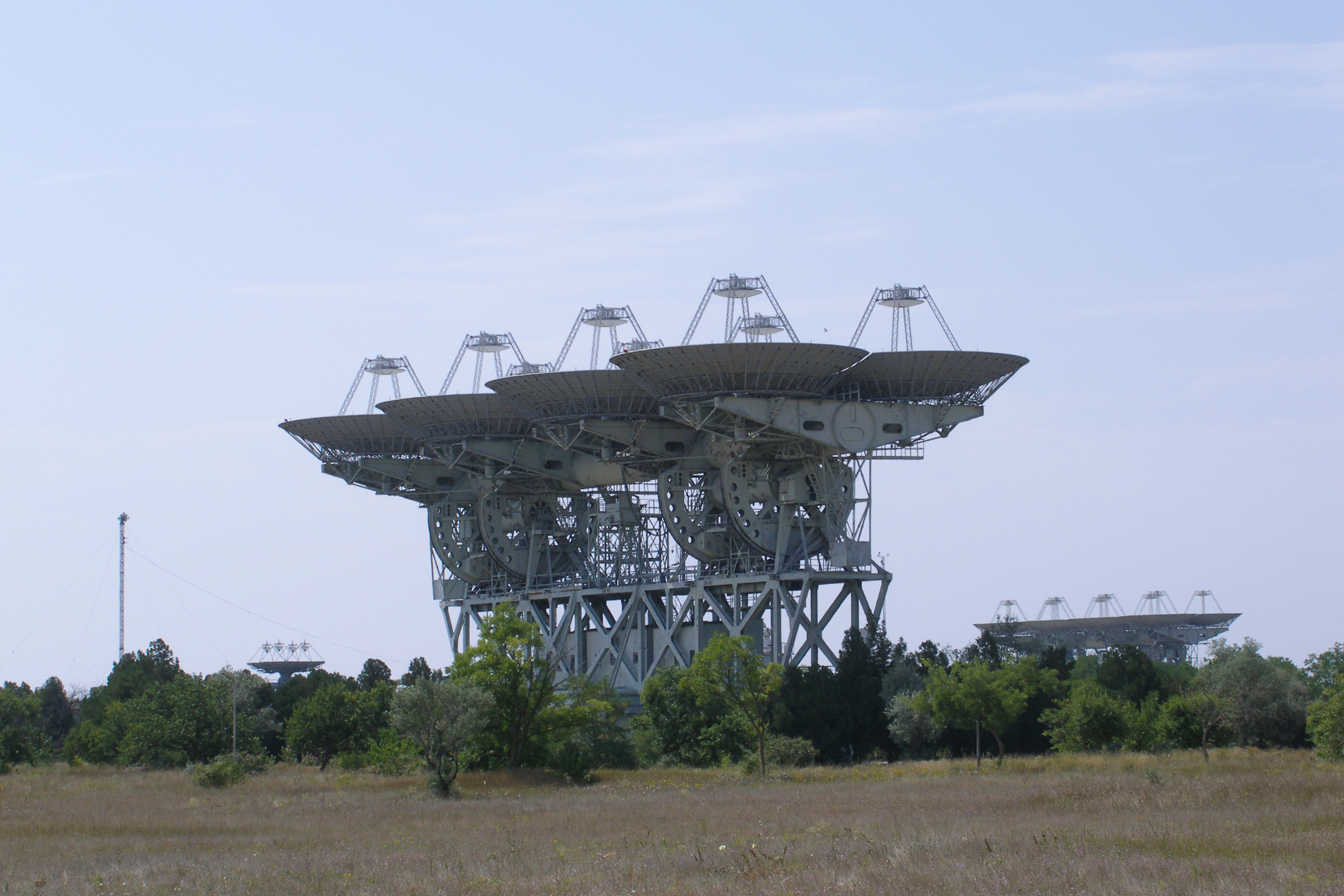
- ADU-1000 South Station transmitting array in 2009 (since removed)
- Location: Republic of Crimea, Russia
- Coordinates: 45°10′13″N 33°15′11″E
- Organization: Center for Deep Space Communications
- Wavelength: Radio 5, 8, 32, and 39 cm
- Built: 1960
- Telescope style: Array of Cassegrain reflectors
- Diameter: Consisted of eight (8) 16 metre dishes
- Collecting area: ≈900 m²
- Mounting: Altitude/azimuth
- Enclosure: None
- Location within Crimea
- Related media on Commons

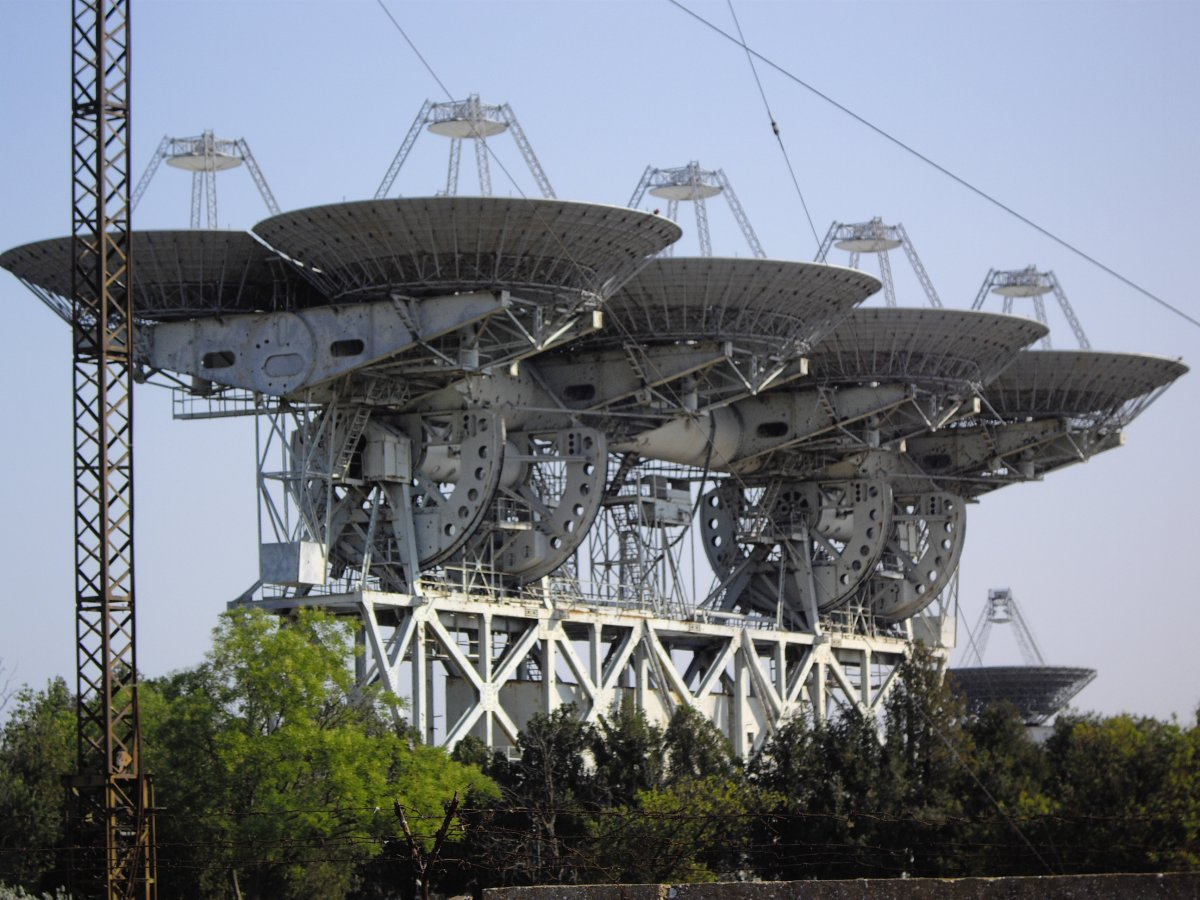
One of two receiving antenna arrays at North Station

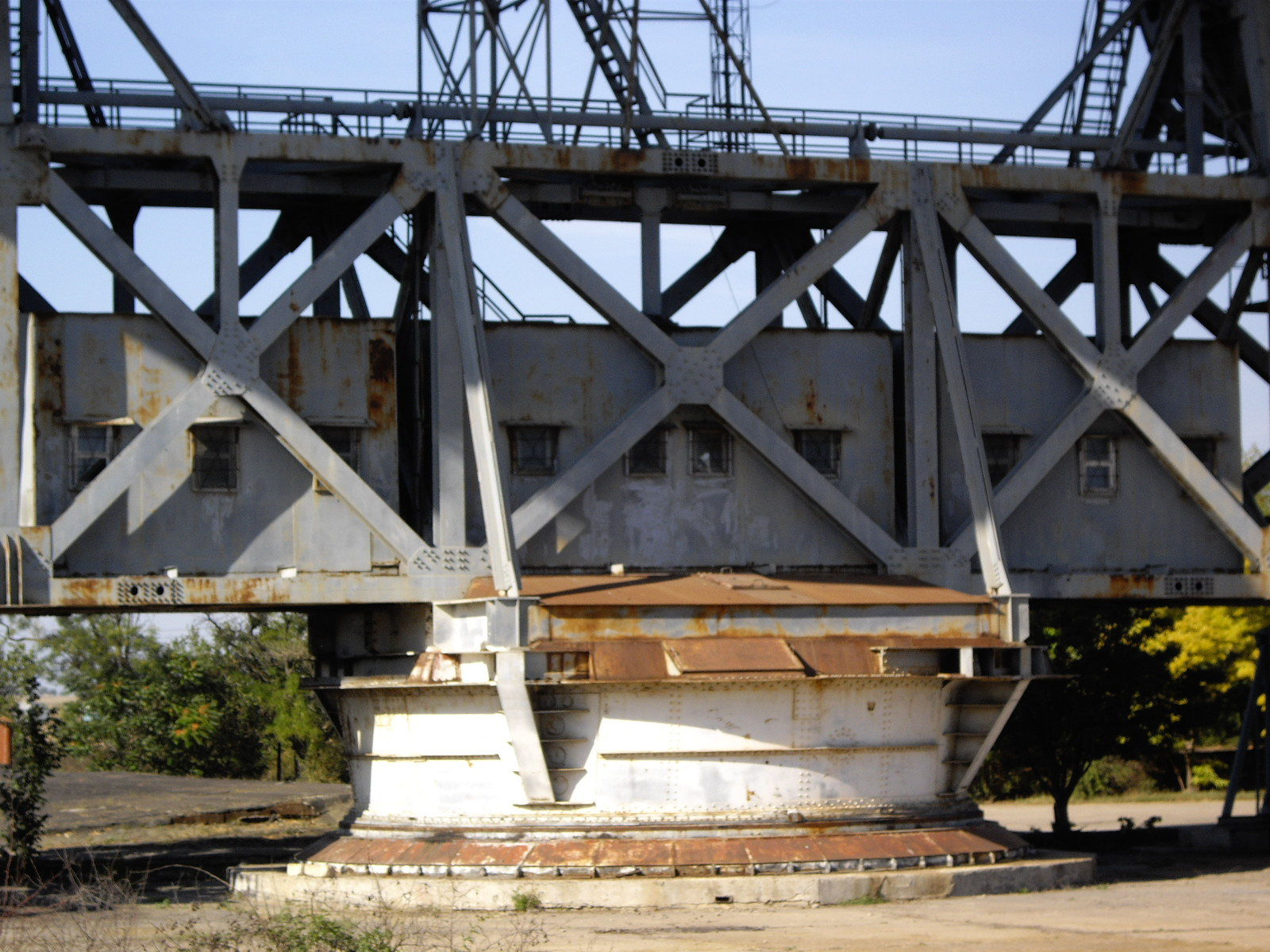
Steerable frames constructed from battleship gun turrets and railway bridge trusses

Pluton is a system of deep space communications and planetary radar in Crimea. It was built in the Deep Space Communication Center area 85th Radiotechnical Center of Distance Communications with Space Objects (Ukrainian: 85 радіотехнічний центр телекомунікації з космічними об'єктами; Russian: 85 радиотехнический центр дальней связи с космическими объектами) in the then Yevpatoria Raion in 1960.

== Overview ==
It consists of at least three antennas. Three of them are of the ADU-1000 design, arrays of eight reflector antennas, each with diameter of 16 metres. Two receiving antennas were built at the North Station at Vityne, and a transmitter was constructed 8.5 kilometres away at the South Station at Zaozerne. Each receiving dish has a Cassegrain system with subreflectors mounted on quadrapods in front of the dishes. The dishes were welded onto the hulls of two diesel submarines and laid onto railway bridge trusses. The ADU-1000 antennas were mounted onto steerable frames constructed from battleship gun turrets and railway bridge trusses.

== History ==
The Pluton complex was the world's highest capacity deep space communication system prior to Goldstone in 1966. It supported all the Soviet space programs until 1978, when the Yevpatoria RT-70 radio telescope was built and the Pluton became a backup for it.

In 1961, it performed one of the world's first radar detections of the planet Venus. In June 1962 it performed the world's first successful radar detection of Mercury. It performed successful radar detection of Mars in February 1963, and of Jupiter in September–October 1963.

On 19 and 24 November 1962, the words «MIR», «LENIN», and «SSSR» were sent in the direction of the star HD131336 in the constellation Libra. These messages (The Morse Message (1962)) are the first radio broadcasts for extraterrestrial civilizations in the history of mankind.

The first Westerner to visit the site was British radio astronomer Bernard Lovell, the Director of the Jodrell Bank Observatory. In 2009, Lovell told The Daily Telegraph that he had developed radiation sickness after the 1963 visit, which he believed was a deliberate attempt by the Soviet authorities, who knew Jodrell Bank was part of the British early-warning system, to assassinate him.

By 11 November 2013, the transmitter antenna at the South Station had been dismantled.

After Russia annexed Crimea in 2014, the complex came under the control of the Russian Aerospace Forces. Ukrainian intelligence believes that work on modernisation started in 2017. The purpose is unknown; some suggest it is part of the Russian ballistic missile early warning system or to support the operation of the Russian GLONASS system. On 23 June 2024, the North Station site was attacked by five Ukrainian-fired ATACMS missiles. Later satellite pictures showed damage to the complex, while NASA’s Fire Information for Resource Management System confirmed a fire was burning at the facility.

== Missions ==
As a deep space communication system:

- Venera-1, −2, −3, −4, −5, −6, −7, −9, −10, −11, −12
- Mars-2, −3, −4, −5, −6, −7
- 1995–2000 – Interball-1
- 16 November 1996 – Mars 96

As planetary radar:

- 18 and 26 April 1961 – radiolocation of Venus. The initial value of the AU deduced, and the time for the planet to rotate, were incorrect. These were later corrected to agree with other groups.
- June 1962, after increasing the sensitivity of the receiving equipment – the world's first radiolocation of Mercury
- October–November 1962 – second radar study of Venus
- February 1963 – radiolocation of Mars
- September–October 1963 – radiolocation of Jupiter

Radio astronomy:

- April 1964 – study Crab Nebula
- 2004 – study coronal holes
