= Ukrkosmos =

Ukrainian state-owned satellite telecom operator

- Type: State-owned company
- Industry: telecommunications
- Founded: September 5, 1996; 29 years ago in Kyiv, Ukraine
- Founder: State Space Agency of Ukraine
- Headquarters: Kyiv, Ukraine
- Key people: Ivan Nazaruk, CEO
- Owner: Ukraine
- Parent: State Space Agency of Ukraine
- Website: www.ukrkosmos.com

Ukrkosmos is a state-owned operator of satellite telecommunication systems in Ukraine, founded in 1996, by the order of the State Space Agency of Ukraine pursuant to the Decree of the President of Ukraine.

== Statutory tasks ==
- satellite uplink services
- DTH services
- state technical policy in the field of satellite telecommunication technologies;
- creation and operation of the Unified Satellite Information System (ЄССПІ);
- operator of the satellite television and radio network, internet broadcasting, Inmarsat mobile satellite communications, corporate and departmental information transmission networks;
- scientific activity in the field of natural and technical sciences;
- space activities on a commercial basis.

== Management ==
From May 1998, the company was headed by Olexander Makarov.

On 10 September 2010, Serhiy Kapshtyk became general director.

Ukrcosmos broadcasts programs from state and commercial television channels, as well as Internet broadcasts, via three servers located in London, New York and Kyiv. The first communication satellite to be operated by the company, Lybid 1, will be launched into space in 2018. The company will also be operating a new satellite, Lybid 1.

Current CEO is Nazaruk Ivan.
