= Lebed (surname) =

Lebed (Russian: Лебедь) is a gender-neutral Slavic surname meaning "swan". It may refer to:

- Aleksey Lebed (1955–2019), Russian politician
- Alexander Lebed (1950–2002), Russian general and politician
- Anatoly Lebed (1963–2012), Russian military officer
- Jonathan Lebed (born 1984), American criminal
- Mykola Lebed (1909–1998), World War II-era Ukrainian fascist war criminal
- Valeriy Lebed (born 1989), Ukrainian football midfielder

== See also ==
- Lebid
