= Sich-1M =

Ukrainian Earth observation satellite

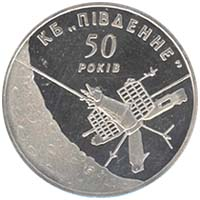
- COSPAR ID: 2004-052A
- SATCAT no.: 28505

Start of mission
- Launch date: 24 December 2004
- Launch site: Plesetsk Cosmodrome Site 32
- Sich satellite series

Sich-1M (Ukrainian: Січ-1М) was a Ukrainian spacecraft, constructed for remote sensing of Earth, designed by Yuzhnoye Design Office and manufactured by Yuzhmash. Sich-1M was designed to receive information simultaneously in the optical, infrared and microwave ranges. The complex of research equipment installed on the spacecraft allowed to study the atmosphere of Earth and the World Ocean, monitoring the hydrological and ice conditions, vegetation and soil cover of the land, etc. Sich-1M was launched on 24 December 2004, at 13:20 from the Plesetsk cosmodrome using the Cyclone-3 launch vehicle together with MK-1TS microsatellite. Both satellites were placed into incorrect orbits due to premature third stage cutoff. The satellite remained in orbit until 15 April 2006.

== See also ==
- Space program of Ukraine
- 2004 in spaceflight
