= Okean-O =

Ukrainian and Russian Earth observation satellite

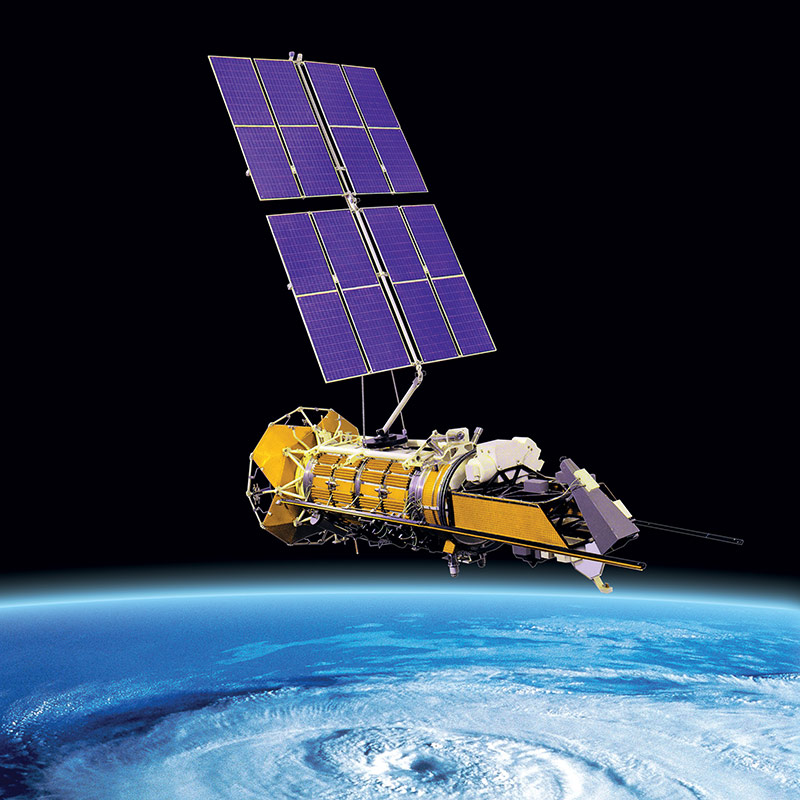
- COSPAR ID: 1999-039A

Spacecraft properties
- Bus: Tselina-2

Start of mission
- Launch date: 17 July 1999
- Rocket: Zenit-2
- Launch site: Baikonur Cosmodrome

End of mission
- Declared: 15 September 2000

Okean-O was a joint Ukrainian and Russian Earth observation satellite focused on oceanography. It was designed by Yuzhnoye State Design Office (now KB Pivdenne), manufactured by Yuzhmash (now Pivdenmash), and launched in July 1999 by a Zenit-2 rocket from Baikonur. The satellite operated until September 2000 when it suffered attitude control problems.
