= Vityne =

Village in Crimea, Ukraine

Vityne Вітине
- Village
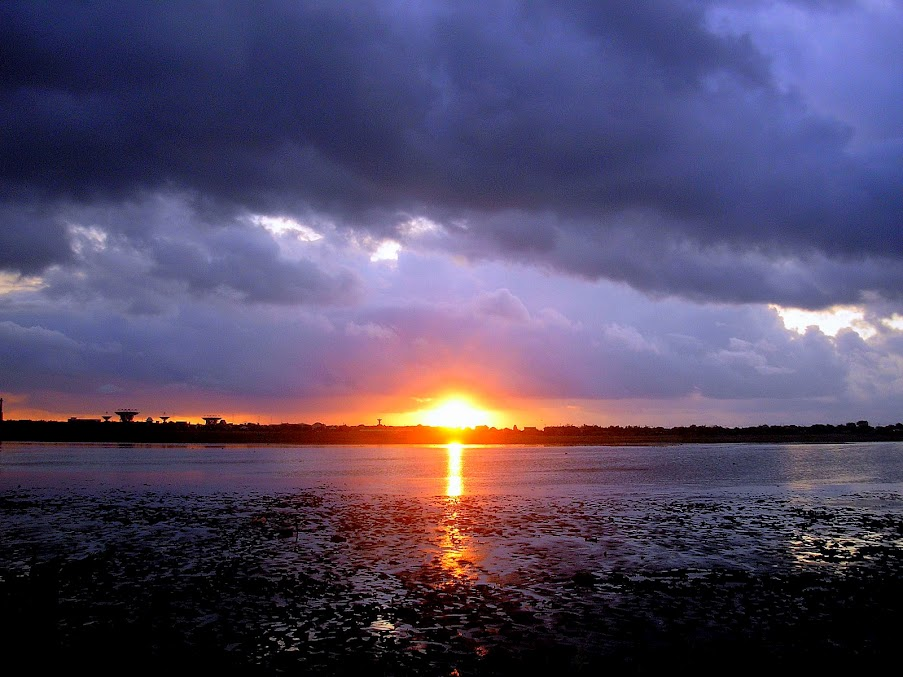
- Sunset in Vityne
- Interactive map of Vityne
- Location of Vityne in Crimea Vityne (Crimea)
- Coordinates: 45.207778°N 33.153056°E
- Country (de jure)^{1}: Ukraine
- Region: Autonomous Republic of Crimea
- Raion: Saky Raion

Area
  - Total: 1.28 km^{2} (0.49 sq mi)
- Elevation: 2 m (6.6 ft)

Population (2001 census)
  - Total: 867
  - Density: 677/km^{2} (1,750/sq mi)
- Time zone: UTC+2 (EET)
  - Summer (DST): UTC+3 (EEST)
- Postal code: 96581
- Area code: +380 6563

Vityne (Ukrainian: Вітине, romanized: Vityne; Russian: Витино, romanized: Vitino) is a village (selo) in Saky Raion (district) in the Autonomous Republic of Crimea, on the western coast of Crimea.

== Demographics ==
As of the 2001 Ukrainian census, the settlement had 867 inhabitants, whose native languages were 20.72% Ukrainian, 76.55% Russian, 3.10% Crimean, 0.39% Belarusian and 0.10% Gagauz.
