= Kraken Regiment =

Ukrainian military volunteer unit

- Спецпідрозділ «Kraken» Spetspidrozdil «Kraken»
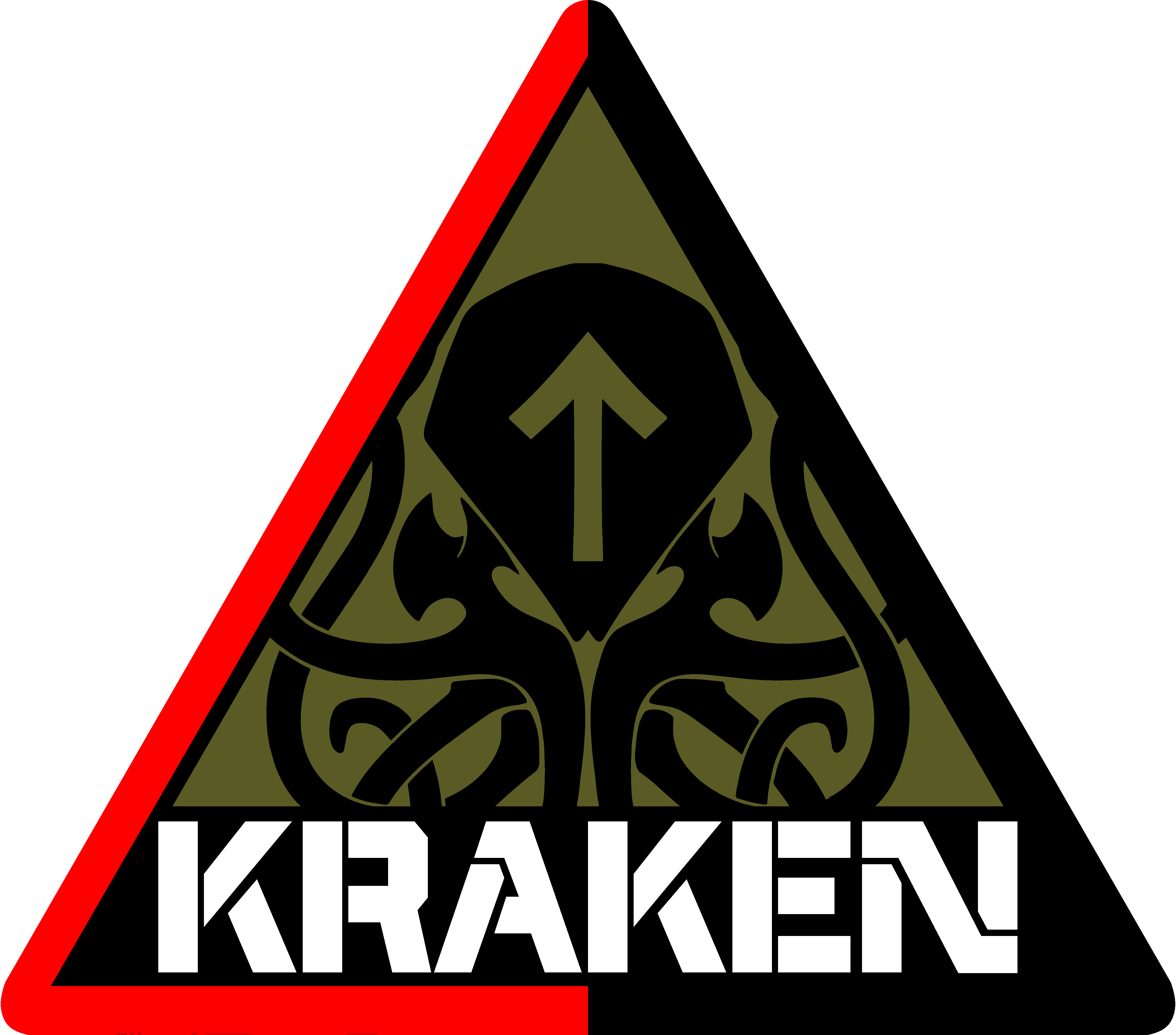
- Kraken insignia
- Founded: February 2022
- Country: Ukraine
- Branch: Main Directorate of Intelligence
- Type: Spetsnaz
- Role: Reconnaissance and sabotage
- Size: 600 - 1,500 (Estimated February 2022); 1,800 (Estimated August 2022)
- Engagements: Russo-Ukrainian War; Russian invasion of Ukraine; Eastern Ukraine campaign; Battle of Kharkiv; Battle of Donbas; Battle of Bakhmut; Battle of Soledar; Luhansk Oblast campaign; Battle of Chasiv Yar; Kharkiv offensive 2024; Kharkiv Counteroffensive; Battle of Balakliia; Battle of Kupiansk
- Website: Official Telegram channel

Commanders
- Current commander: “Alpha” (2025 - present)

Insignia
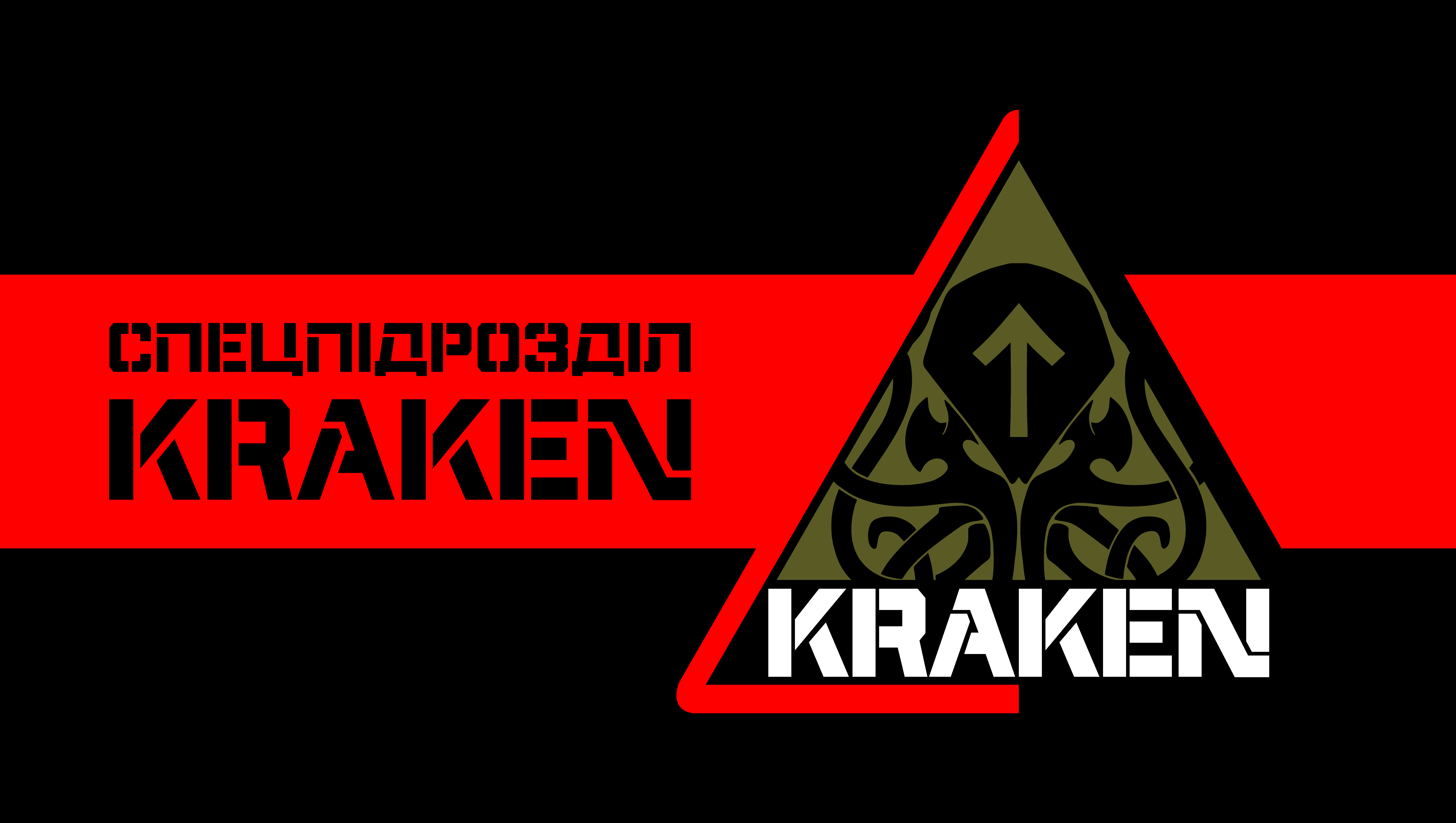
- First Flag Variant

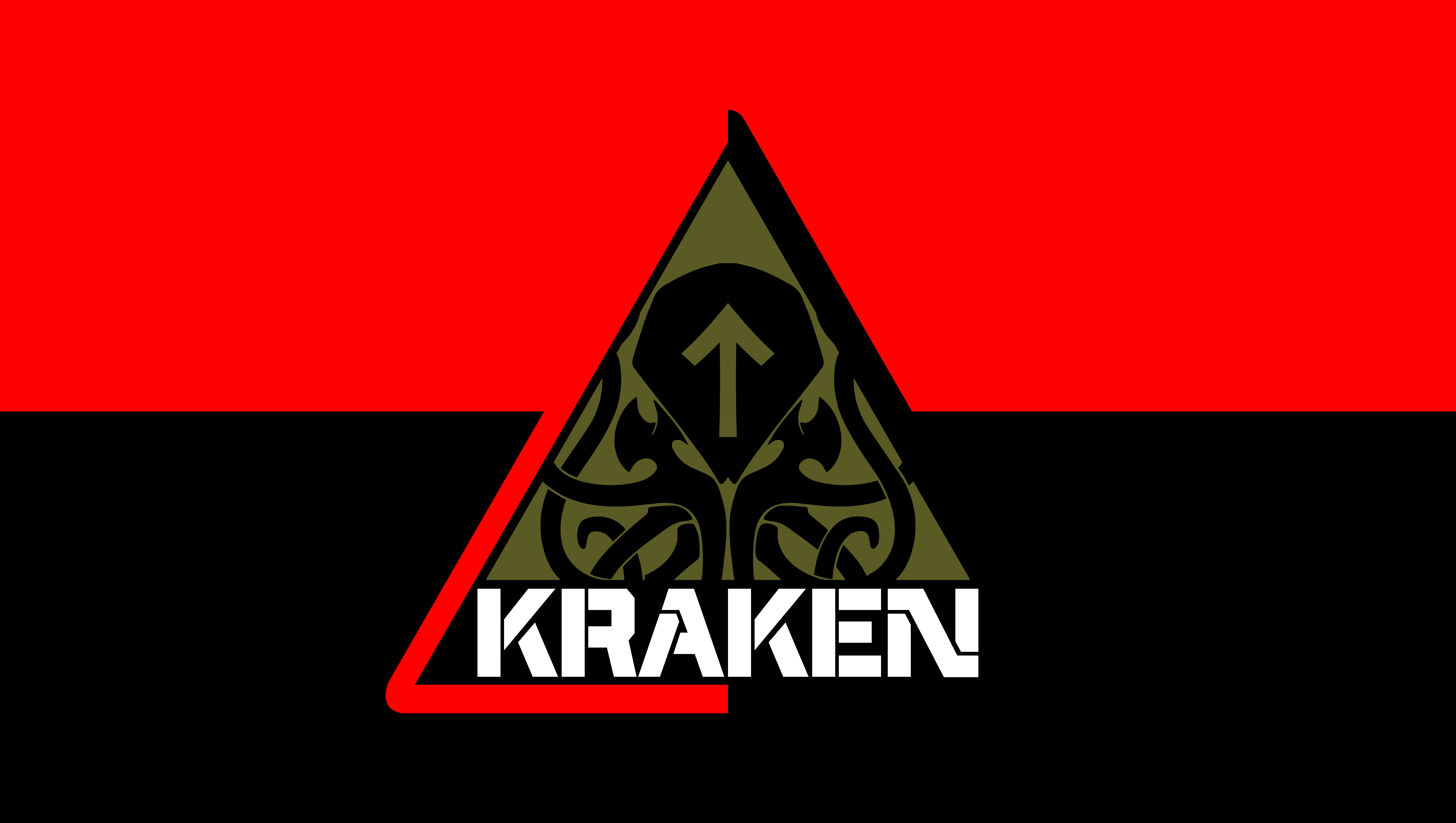
- Second Flag Variant

The Kraken Regiment (Ukrainian: Спецпідрозділ "Kraken", romanized: Spetspidrozdil "Kraken") is a Ukrainian military volunteer unit, part of the spetsnaz units of the Main Directorate of Intelligence of Ukraine (HUR) formed in 2022 as a response to the Russian invasion of Ukraine.

Named after the mythical sea creature, the regiment was formed by veterans of the Azov Regiment and has successfully liberated several occupied villages during the fighting, later also taking part in counter offensives and sabotage operations, becoming one of the more high-profile volunteer units in the war.

== History ==
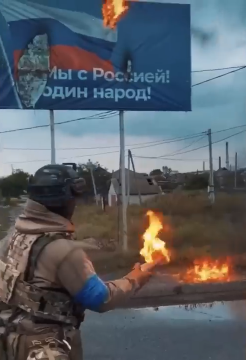
Member of the Kraken Regiment burning a pro-Russian propaganda billboard with a Molotov cocktail in Kupiansk during the 2022 Kharkiv counteroffensive.

=== Origin ===
Many of the eventual members of the Kraken Regiment came from an established network of football "ultras" and others who gathered in the Kharkiv hideouts that had been stashed with arms in preparation for the Russian invasion of Ukraine on 24 February 2022. At the same time, Kostiantyn Nemichev, who was at the time head of the local National Corps, was gathering volunteer soldiers. They took part in the defence of Kharkiv, and by March after driving out Russians of Vilkhivka the unit had started to form to the point the name ″Kraken″ was chosen after a commander of the unit suggested it based on his Naval special forces background.

=== Activities in 2022–23 ===
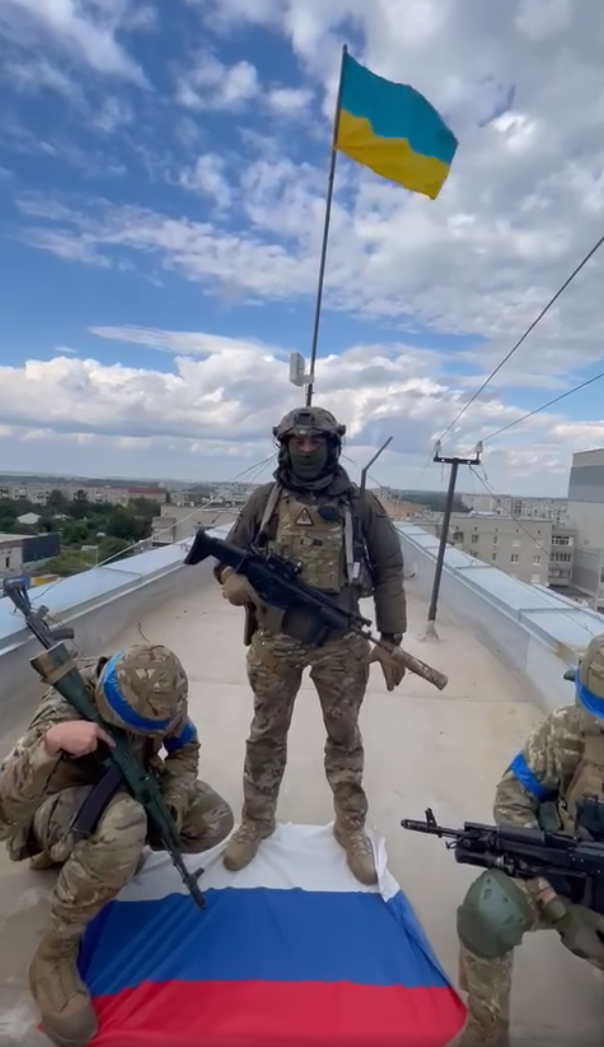
Kraken members in Balakliia

In April 2022, the unit dismantled the monument to Marshal Georgy Zhukov in Kharkiv. In late September, it was reported that Nemichev claimed the unit had captured more than 15 Russian officers, handing them over to the Main Intelligence Directorate. He was quoted saying “All of them were thrown into the infantry. Therefore, it is indicative that Russians have big problems now. They do not know where to get people to send to death. Therefore, they gather them in different units and deploy them here. So they’re not doing well as it is, and then we come along and ‘spoil the mood’ some more.”

Also in September, the regiment was reported to have played a key role in recapturing Izium. In late December, the Main Directorate of Intelligence published a video showing Kraken along with the 92nd Separate Mechanized Brigade carrying out an assault on Novoselivske, successfully removing the Russian forces in the settlement and inflicting losses upon Russian equipment and personnel. In January 2023, the president of Ukraine Volodymyr Zelenskyy personally thanked the regiment for their work fighting enemies in the Soledar region.

In March 2023, Kraken announced the destruction of a Russian observation tower in Bryansk Oblast through the use of a kamikaze drone. The unit posted a video of the operation showing the tower being destroyed, though did not specify exactly when it took place.

According to leaked documents, in response to the worsening situation in the battle of Bakhmut, UAF Ground Forces Commander Oleksandr Syrskyi "declared a need for HUR's elite Kraken unit to prevent the UAF from losing Bakhmut" and subsequently deployed it to the city. No further information was provided, but Bakhmut was still under Ukrainian control six weeks later.

On 21 October 2023, Zelenskyy again thanked the unit for successfully performing ″particularly complex″ tasks on the battlefield.

In December 2023, Kraken special forces "eliminated" Sergey Melniko, who served as chief of staff of Russia's Storm Ossetia battalion, under Moscow's 429th Motorized Rifle Regiment after Melniko's driver crashed while trying to avoid a Kraken FPV done.

=== Activities in 2024–25 ===
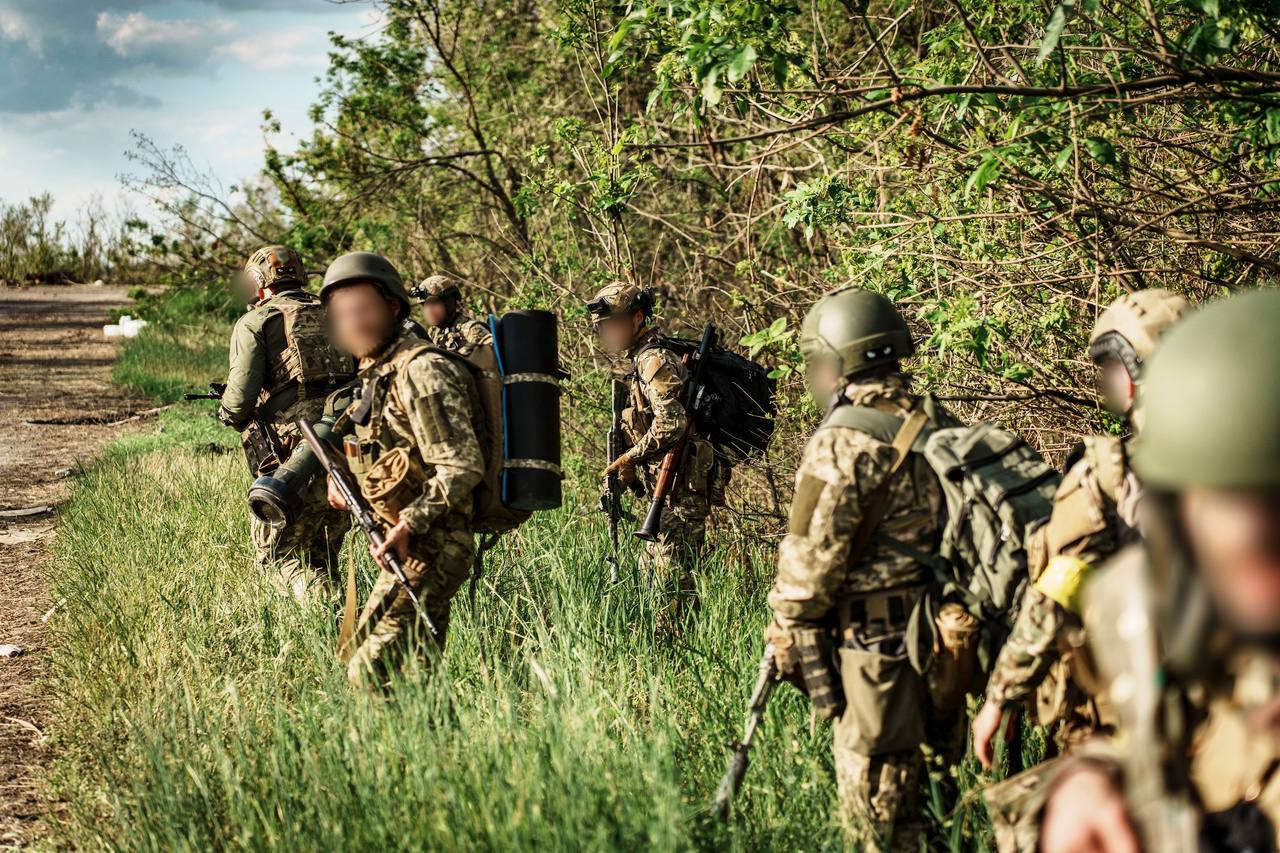
Kraken soldiers resting in Pytomnyk, Kharkiv Oblast

In June 2024, the Kraken Regiment was deployed to the Kharkiv region to counter Russia's renewed summer offensive. They took defensive positions in Chasiv Yar in the Donetsk Oblast.

According to sources in Ukraine's Main Military Intelligence Directorate (GUR), the "Kraken" Regiment was involved in a June attack in the Belgorod Oblast. Ukrainian forces used HIMARS to destroy four Russian S-300 systems, marking the first officially announced attack on Russian air defense in the Belgorod Oblast.

In October 2024, the Kraken special unit helped to defend the Kharkiv region, near the village of Lyptsi. According to unit commanders, Kraken weakened the Russian army's positions.

In March 2025, Kyiv Post interviewed the commander of the unit with the call sign of “Alpha”. He said that his preparations for operations included personally visiting the personnel carrying them out, and credited the flexibility, trust and decision making of the unit for its effectiveness. He also praised Kyrylo Budanov's leadership of HUR. According to Alpha, the unit had captured six Russian soldiers in one instance who surrendered voluntarily after being told by their commanders that they would be executed if they retreated, a situation he said was becoming more common with intercepted Russian communications from officers openly displaying disregard for their subordinates.

In May 2025 Russia launched a massive offensive in the Kharkiv region. The Kraken Regiment helped to defend the village of Lyptsi in Kharkiv region. According to HUR, an entire Russian regiment was lost in the operation. Russian troops included spetsnaz elements which were pushed back by the First Special Assault Company, backed by artillery teams.

== Structure ==
As of 2024, the regiment's structure is as follows:

- Kraken Regiment
  - Regimental Headquarters and HQ Company
  - Field Artillery Group
    - Sparta Anti-Tank Group
    - Rocket Artillery Unit
    - Mortar Company
  - Brave Group
  - Drone Company
    - Luftwaffe Group
    - Bandera Group
    - Aerial Reconnaissance Unit "Gurkit"
  - Engineering Unit
    - Sapper Unit
    - Explosive Department
  - FPV Company
  - Special Assault Company
    - Biznes Team
  - Regimental Tank Company
    - 1st Tank Platoon
    - 2nd Tank Platoon
    - 3rd Tank Platoon
  - 1st Assault Company
    - 1st Assault Platoon
    - 2nd Assault Platoon
  - 2nd Assault Company
    - Assault Bastards
    - Divers Group
    - Shybenyk Squad
  - 3rd Assault Company
    - Gurza Group
  - 4th Assault Company
    - 1st Assault Platoon
    - 2nd Assault Platoon
  - Armored Company
  - Sky Squad
  - Sniper Group "Voryat"
  - J9 Department
  - Medical Service

== Organization ==
=== Leadership ===
The commander of the regiment, Konstantin V. Nemichev, is a military and political figure in Kharkiv, member of the National Corps and veteran of the Azov Battalion, with many of his supporters joining the unit.

=== Members ===
Like the Azov Regiment, the Kraken Regiment has also been the subject of controversy surrounding recruitment of fighters from far-right groups, though the soldiers of the unit reject the claim as Russian propaganda. Commanders in the unit acknowledged that it is possible that far-right individuals are members in the regiment, but said such people are outnumbered by a diverse group with the intent to defend Ukraine. Kraken is not officially part of the Armed Forces of Ukraine, but answers to the Defense Ministry.

The unit is said to be composed of "gym rats", "ultras" and bouncers, while also having drawn in experienced combat veterans of ages varying between 25 and 60. The morale of the regiment has been described as high.

==== Selection process ====
Before becoming members of the regiment, candidates must undergo testing including questionnaires and a polygraph test. Candidates are then taken to a training center where they go through a 14-day test, of which about 30–35% of candidates pass.

== Equipment ==
Kraken has published media showcasing their use of Western small arms weaponry, including Austrian Glock pistols, Belgian Scar rifles, American M4A1 assault rifles, DD MK18s, Swiss B&T submachine guns, and lightweight multi-shot RBG6 grenade launchers made in Croatia.

According to Militarnyi, in June 2022, the regiment possessed four Alvis vehicles. In September 2023, the regiment acquired a restored trophy Ural-63706-0010 Tornado-U truck.

== See also ==
- Ukrainian Volunteer Corps
- Skala Battalion
- Omega group
- Serhii Velichko
