= Serhii Velichko =

Ukrainian soldier (born 1994)

- Сергі́й Оле́гович Вели́чко
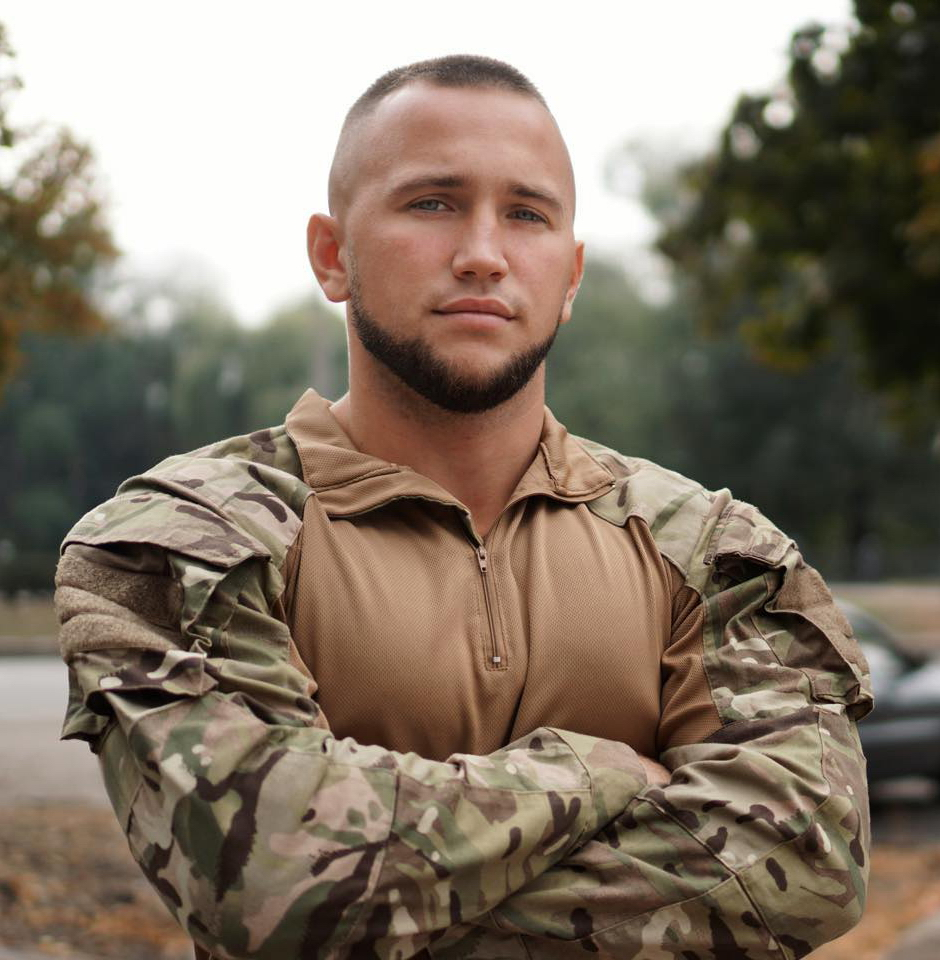
- Born: Serhii Olehovych Velichko; 3 January 1994 (age 32); Kharkiv, Ukraine
- Military career
- Branch: National Guard of Ukraine; Armed Forces of Ukraine
- Service years: 2014–present
- Units: Azov; Kraken (2022–2025)
- Conflicts: War in Donbas; Russian invasion of Ukraine

Serhii Olehovych Velichko (Ukrainian: Сергій Олегович Величко; born 3 January 1994), also known by the call sign Chili (Ukrainian: Чілі), is a Ukrainian serviceman and former activist of the National Corps. He served with Azov during the war in Donbas and, following the Russian full-scale invasion of Ukraine in 2022, became an officer of the Main Directorate of Intelligence of the Ministry of Defence (HUR) and one of the commanders of Kraken.

In August 2021, Velichko was detained by the Security Service of Ukraine (SBU) and accused of organising and leading an alleged criminal organisation involved in extortion and interference with businesses in Kharkiv Oblast. Velichko denied the accusations and described the case as fabricated. He remained in pre-trial detention when Russia launched its full-scale invasion on 24 February 2022 and was released shortly afterwards to take part in the defence of Ukraine. In 2025, he was transferred from HUR to the Armed Forces of Ukraine.

== Biography ==
Velichko was born on 3 January 1994, in Kharkiv, Ukraine. He participated in Euromaidan, defending the protesters from titushky and Yanukovych's Berkut police. Members of the National Corps have attributed Velichko with originating the chant "Putin khuylo!", which became widely used in Ukraine during the Russo-Ukrainian War. As a fighter in the Azov Brigade, Velichko fought in the war in Donbas.

After returning from the front in 2015, Velichko became an activist in Kharkiv. He founded the Kharkiv Oblast branch of the National Corps. During this time, Velichko conducted humanitarian assistance throughout the city of Kharkiv and the wider oblast, notably organizing a humanitarian mission during the Balakliia warehouse explosion in 2017.

=== 2021 criminal proceedings ===
On 5 August 2021, the Security Service of Ukraine (SBU) detained Velichko and six other people associated with the National Corps in connection with an investigation into an alleged organised criminal group in Kharkiv Oblast. The following day, the Shevchenkivskyi District Court of Kyiv ordered all seven suspects to be held in pre-trial detention without bail. According to investigators, the alleged organisation had been established in 2018 and comprised around 50 people. Prosecutors alleged that it extorted business owners, including businesses in the funeral-services sector, and generated more than ₴1 million per month. Law-enforcement authorities described the alleged organisation as having a hierarchy consisting of leaders, an enforcement wing, and members responsible for maintaining corrupt connections with law-enforcement officials. Investigators identified Velichko as the alleged organiser and leader of the group. They alleged that he organised its activities, approved its plans, ordered assaults and the intimidation of business owners, and made decisions concerning money allegedly obtained through criminal activity. The suspects were investigated for offences under Articles 255, 189 and 206 of the Criminal Code of Ukraine, concerning the creation of or participation in a criminal organisation, extortion, and obstruction of lawful business activity respectively. Velichko denied the allegations and described the case against him as fabricated. His lawyers argued that the prosecution had not adequately substantiated the allegations and raised objections concerning the circumstances and procedures surrounding the arrests. On 27 August 2021, the Kyiv Court of Appeal rejected an application to release Velichko and upheld the order keeping him in pre-trial detention until 3 October 2021.

=== Russian invasion of Ukraine and Kraken ===
Velichko remained in pre-trial detention when Russia began its full-scale invasion of Ukraine on 24 February 2022. In the first days of the invasion, Ukrainian authorities began releasing some serving and former military personnel from prisons and pre-trial detention facilities if they volunteered for military service. A prosecutor from the Office of the Prosecutor General stated at the time that authorities were considering factors including military experience and previous service when deciding whether detainees should be released. Ukrainska Pravda subsequently reported that Velichko was among those released shortly after the invasion so that they could participate in the defence of Ukraine. By the end of February, he had joined the defence of Kharkiv. Velichko later said that he regarded his pre-war imprisonment as connected to conflicts with pro-Russian political forces and elements of the Ukrainian security services. Velichko and fellow Azov veteran Kostiantyn Nemichev became prominent members of the Kharkiv volunteer formations organised during the opening stages of the invasion. These formations subsequently provided part of the nucleus of Kraken, a special-purpose unit subordinate to the Main Directorate of Intelligence of the Ministry of Defence (HUR). By 2023, Ukrainska Pravda described both Velichko and Nemichev as HUR officers. A 2024 article in the Journal of Illicit Economies and Development described Velichko as having become a commander of Kraken under HUR. Kraken took part in the defence of Kharkiv and subsequent Ukrainian operations in Kharkiv Oblast. Velichko participated in operations around Vilkhivka, Ruska Lozova, Pytomnyk, Balakliia and Kupiansk during the 2022 fighting and Ukrainian counter-offensives in the region.

Velichko's release and subsequent role in Kraken have been discussed in academic research concerning the Ukrainian state's wartime relationships with people accused or convicted of serious crimes. In a 2024 article in the peer-reviewed Journal of Illicit Economies and Development, political scientist Andrew Cesare Miller cited Velichko's release from custody and subsequent command role under HUR as one example in a broader examination of Ukraine's wartime use of criminal groups and criminal actors for national defence. Miller characterised such arrangements more generally as wartime relationships in which the state could obtain intelligence or manpower while criminal actors might receive measures such as release or deferred prosecution. He argued that the Ukrainian cases resembled what political scientist Nicholas Barnes has termed an "alliance" relationship between the state and organised crime: an arrangement involving formal or tacit agreements that restrict enforcement while creating benefits for both sides. Miller nevertheless noted that the full extent of the Ukrainian government's wartime arrangements with criminal actors remained unknown.

=== Transfer to the Armed Forces ===
By 2025, Velichko was no longer serving in HUR's Kraken unit. In an August 2025 interview, Kraken commander "Alpha" stated that Velichko and Nemichev had been transferred from HUR to the Armed Forces of Ukraine as part of reforms to the military command structure. According to Alpha, the two men were intended to reinforce the command staff of one of the newly established Ukrainian army corps. He did not identify the corps or Velichko's new position.
