= Favbet Foundation =

Charity based in Ukraine

- Formation: 28 April 2020; 5 years ago
- Headquarters: Kyiv, Ukraine
- Leader: Andriy Matyukha
- Website: favbet.foundation

Favbet Foundation is one of the largest charitable foundations in Ukraine, founded in 2020 to develop sports and educational infrastructure for Ukrainian children. Since the 2022 Russian invasion of Ukraine, the charity focused on the help to the Armed Forces of Ukraine, Territorial Defense Forces, and humanitarian aid for citizens affected by the Russo-Ukrainian War.

== History ==
The Foundation was founded on April 28, 2020, and is headed by Andriy Matiukha. In 2020, a workout zone was built at the NSC Olimpiyskiy in Kyiv, which is free for visitors.

In 2021, the foundation was engaged in the creation of digital libraries as a partner of the project of the Ministry of Digital Transformation, the Office of the President and the Ukrainian Library Association "Digitalization of Libraries". In the same year, the foundation donated 2100 plasma TVs to family-type orphanages.

Since October 2021, the Favbet Foundation has been cooperating with the Come Back Alive Foundation as part of the Invictus Games project. Since February 24, 2022, the foundation has transferred UAH 1.6 million to Come Back Alive. Since 2022, with the beginning of Russia's full-scale invasion of Ukraine, the foundation has refocused most of its projects on providing the Armed Forces and supporting Ukrainians affected by the war.

In April 2022, the Foundation opened an Adaptation Center for IDPs from Ukraine in Zagreb.

== Activities ==
In 2022, Foundation donated UAH 46 million for purchasing the vehicles and special equipment for the Armed Forces and other defense forces.

In particular, the Armed Forces received more than 100 vehicles, mostly SUVs, armored cars and minibuses, more than 60 drones for reconnaissance and artillery fire adjustment, as well as hundreds of pieces of high-tech equipment: communication systems, thermal imagers, night vision devices and sights, distance meters, etc.

In addition, in the first year massive Russian invasion of Ukraine, Favbet Foundation provided financial support to the Presidential initiative United24, as well as to the Armed Forces through a special account of the National Bank of Ukraine totaling more than UAH 7 million.

The Foundation supports the Okhmatdyt Children's Hospital and the Romodanov Institute of Neurosurgery. The Foundation fully supports 2 orphanages.

Since 24 February 2022, the Foundation donated over 240 special vehicle to the Armed forces of Ukraine and a few hundreds specialized military drones.

== Projects ==
=== Strength in knowledge ===
The project delivers 5500 stationery sets for learning and creativity to children of internally displaced persons and defenders.

=== Stronger together ===
The project provides children affected by the war with the opportunity to engage in sports on a regular basis. The Foundation organizes sports clubs in partnership with the Sport for All Center for Physical Health and the SpartaBox Fight Club.

=== IT Kids ===
Educational courses in IT for children from IDP families and military personnel. Favbet Foundation together with Code Club Ukraine launched a free basic IT education program that teaches Python programming language to 350 students.
