= Sombra (software company) =

Ukrainian software development and IT consulting company

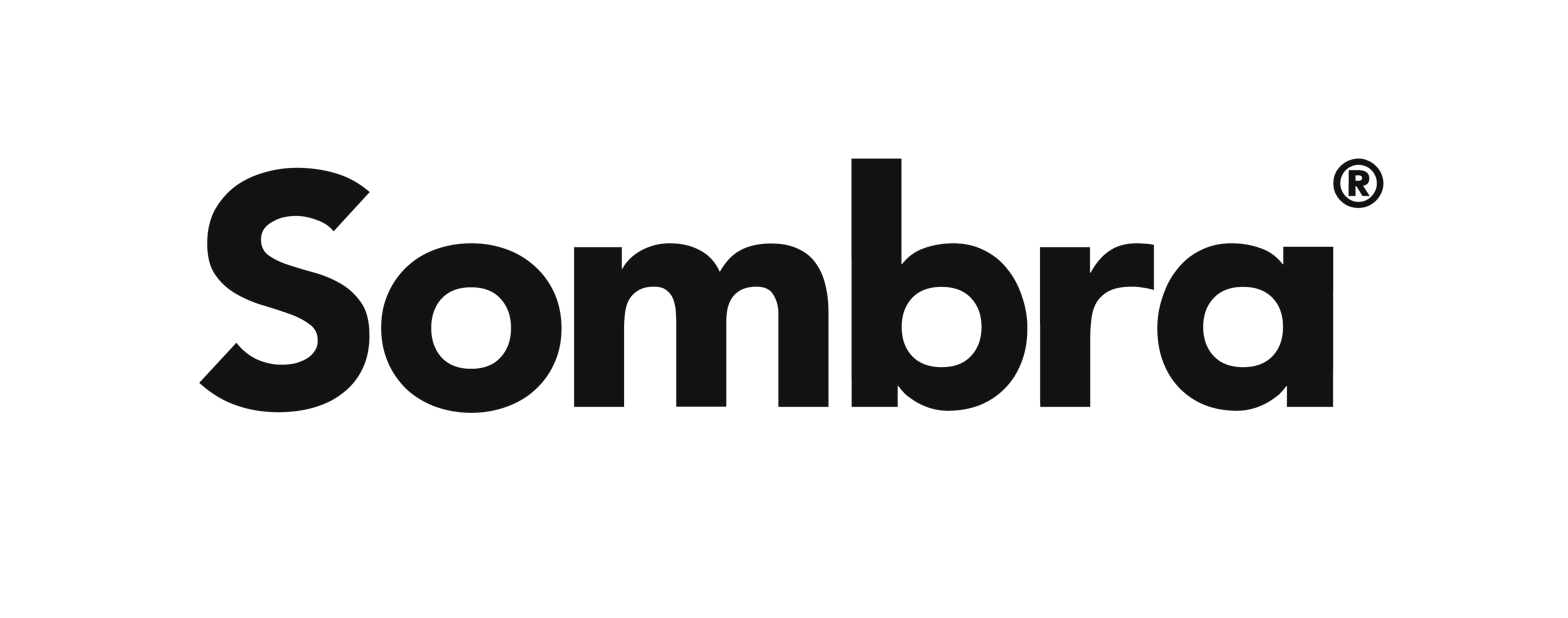
- Type: Private
- Industry: Information technology
- Founded: 2013
- Founder: Viktor Chekh; Serhii Miakshynov
- Headquarters: Lviv, Ukraine
- Area served: Worldwide (primarily North America and Europe)
- Key people: Viktor Chekh (CEO); Yurii Nakonechnyi (CTO); Oleh Kozak (COO); Andrii Kaniuka (CFO); Dmytro Klymenko (CRO)
- Services: Custom software development, IT consulting, dedicated development teams, cloud consulting, AI integration
- Number of employees: 400+ (2026)
- Website: sombrainc.com

Sombra is a global information technology company with Ukrainian roots, specializing in custom software development, IT consulting, and dedicated development teams. Founded in 2013 in Lviv, the company primarily serves clients in North America and Europe across the financial services, healthcare, logistics, and e-commerce sectors.

Alongside its headquarters in Lviv and development centers in Kyiv and Ivano-Frankivsk, Sombra operates delivery offices in Medellín (Colombia), Kraków (Poland), and India.

== History ==
Sombra was founded in 2013 in Lviv by Viktor Chekh and Serhii Miakshynov, with Yurii Nakonechnyi joining as a co-owner and Chief Technology Officer in late 2014. Initially fulfilling projects through freelance platforms such as Upwork, the company transitioned to long-term software engineering contracts with clients in the United States, Canada, the United Kingdom, and Australia.

By July 2017, Sombra had grown to 70 employees across offices in Lviv and Ivano-Frankivsk, later opening a branch in Kyiv. In 2023, the company began international expansion by establishing an engineering hub in Medellín, Colombia, to recruit specialists across Latin America. According to LIGA.net, its Colombian operations contributed to a 40% revenue growth during the Russo-Ukrainian war.

In October 2024, Sombra opened an office in Kraków, Poland, surpassing 350 specialists globally. In May 2026, the company expanded operations to India; by that time, it employed over 340 specialists in Ukraine and 60 in Colombia.

== Educational and charitable initiatives ==
Sombra cooperates with Lviv Polytechnic National University, where company specialists teach software engineering courses and funded the modernization of a computer-aided design laboratory in October 2022.

Following the Russian invasion of Ukraine in February 2022, the company launched charitable initiatives to support the Armed Forces of Ukraine and humanitarian relief efforts in partnership with the Come Back Alive foundation, contributing approximately $500,000 by October 2022.
