= Vilkhivka rural hromada =

Administrative unit in Kharkiv Oblast, Ukraine

Vilkhivka rural hromada Вільхівська селищна громада
- Hromada
- Interactive map of Vilkhivka rural hromada
- Country: Ukraine
- Oblast: Kharkiv
- Raion: Kharkiv
- Admin. center: Vilkhivka

Area
  - Total: 219 km^{2} (85 sq mi)

Population (2022)
  - Total: 12,030
  - Density: 54.9/km^{2} (142/sq mi)
- Settlements: 17
- Rural settlements: 6
- Villages: 11
- Website: vilh.gov.ua

Vilkhivka rural territorial hromada (Ukrainian: Вільхівська територіа́льна грома́да) is a hromada (municipality) in Ukraine, in Kharkiv Raion of Kharkiv Oblast. The Vilkhivka rural hromada is located near the eastern borders of the city of Kharkiv, on the Central Russian Upland, within the forest steppe natural zone. The administrative center is the village of Vilkhivka.

== Composition and extent ==
The area of the hromada is 219 square kilometres (85 mi^{2}), and the population is 12,030 (2022 estimate).

It consists of eleven villages:

- Bairak
- Biskvitne
- Blahodatne
- Bobrivka
- Koropy
- Mala Rohan
- Sorokivka
- Stepanky
- Verkhnia Rohanka
- Vilkhivka
- Zatyshshia

And six rural-type settlements:

- Elitne
- Kutuzivka
- Momotove
- Prelesne
- Slobidske
- Zernove

== History ==
During the Russian invasion of Ukraine, Vilkhivka was conquered by the Russian troops in 2022, but was later retaken March 27 by the Ukrainian army.

== Geography ==
The Vilkhivka rural hromada is located near the eastern borders of the city of Kharkiv. The administrative center of the community is the village of Vilkhivka, located 8 km east of the city of Kharkiv. The name comes from the fact that there were many alder trees in this area.

The territory of the Vilkhivka rural hromada is located on the Central Russian Upland, within the forest steppe natural zone. The relief of the village is an undulating plain with ravines and gullies. The Rohanka River, a left tributary of the Uda River (Donets basin), flows through the hromada. A reservoir was built on the river for fish farming and recreational needs of the Vilkhiv hromada.

The climate of the Vilkhivka rural hromada is temperate continental with cold winters and hot summers. The average annual temperature is +8.7 °C (in January -4.5, in July +22). The average annual rainfall is 520 mm. The highest rainfall occurs in the summer. There are large forest areas (pine and deciduous trees) on the territory of the village. The soils of the community are chernozems and meadow soils.

The regional highway Kharkiv-Stary Saltiv and the european route E40 pass through the Vilkhivka rural hromada.The nearest railway station is in Kharkiv.
