= Kutuzivka, Kharkiv Oblast =

Kutuzivka Кутузівка
- Rural settlement
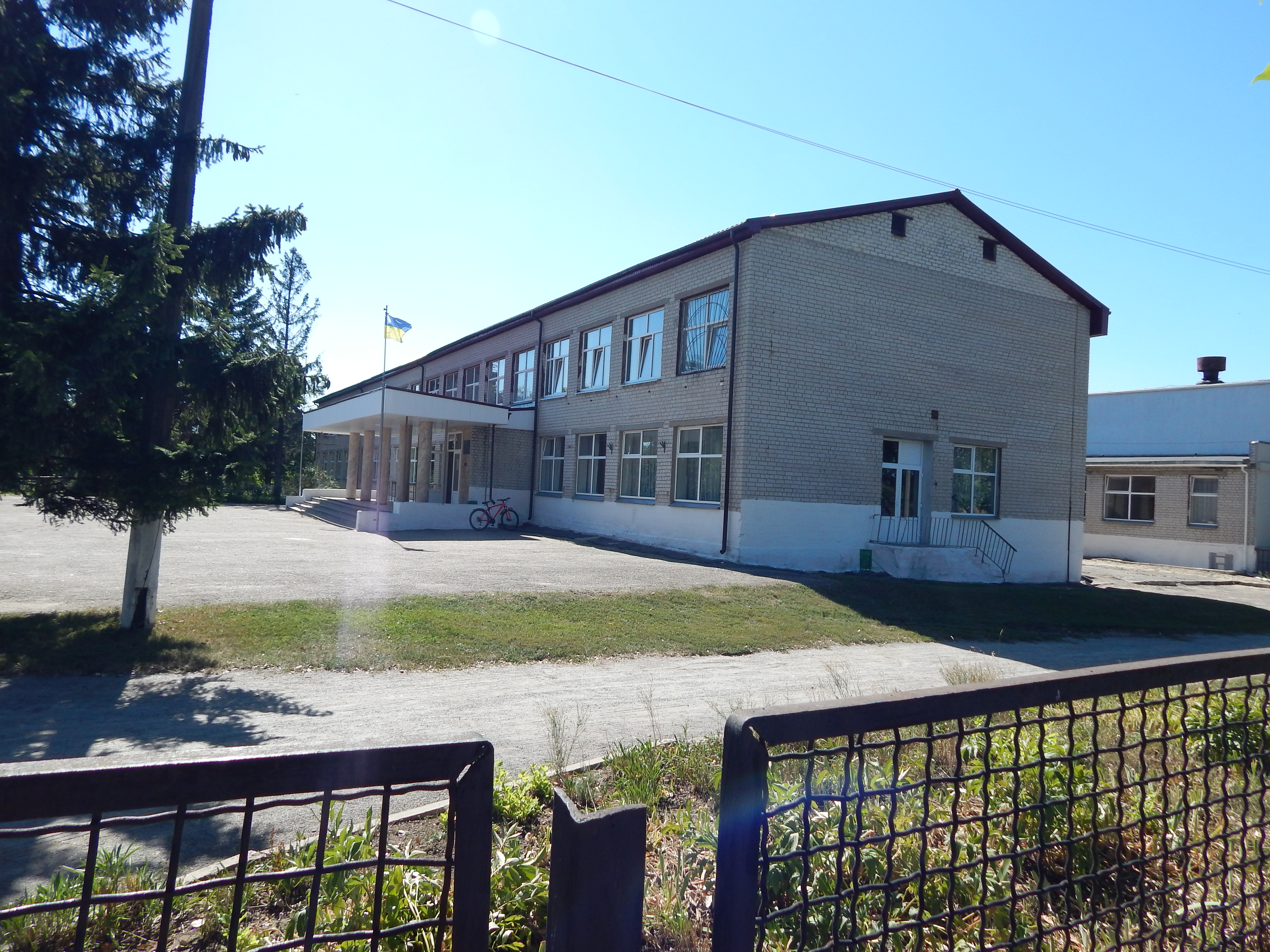
- A schoolhouse
- Interactive map of Kutuzivka
- Location of Kutuzivka within Ukraine Kutuzivka (Ukraine)
- Coordinates: 50.043056°N 36.468611°E
- Country: Ukraine
- Oblast: Kharkiv Oblast
- Raion: Kharkiv Raion
- Hromada: Vilkhivka
- Founded: 1839

Area
  - Total: 0.46 km^{2} (0.18 sq mi)
- Elevation: 201 m (659 ft)

Population (2001 census)
  - Total: 1,184
  - Density: 2,600/km^{2} (6,700/sq mi)
- Time zone: UTC+2 (EET)
  - Summer (DST): UTC+3 (EEST)
- Postal code: 62405
- Area code: +380 57

Kutuzivka (Ukrainian: Кутузівка; Russian: Кутузовка) is a rural settlement in Kharkiv Raion, Kharkiv Oblast, eastern Ukraine, about 18.5 kilometres (11.5 mi) northeast by north from the centre of Kharkiv city. It belongs to Vilkhivka rural hromada, one of the hromadas of Ukraine.

The village came under attack by Russian forces in April 2022, during the Russian invasion of Ukraine.
