= Korostyshiv =

City in Zhytomyr Oblast, Ukraine

Korostyshiv Коростишів
- City
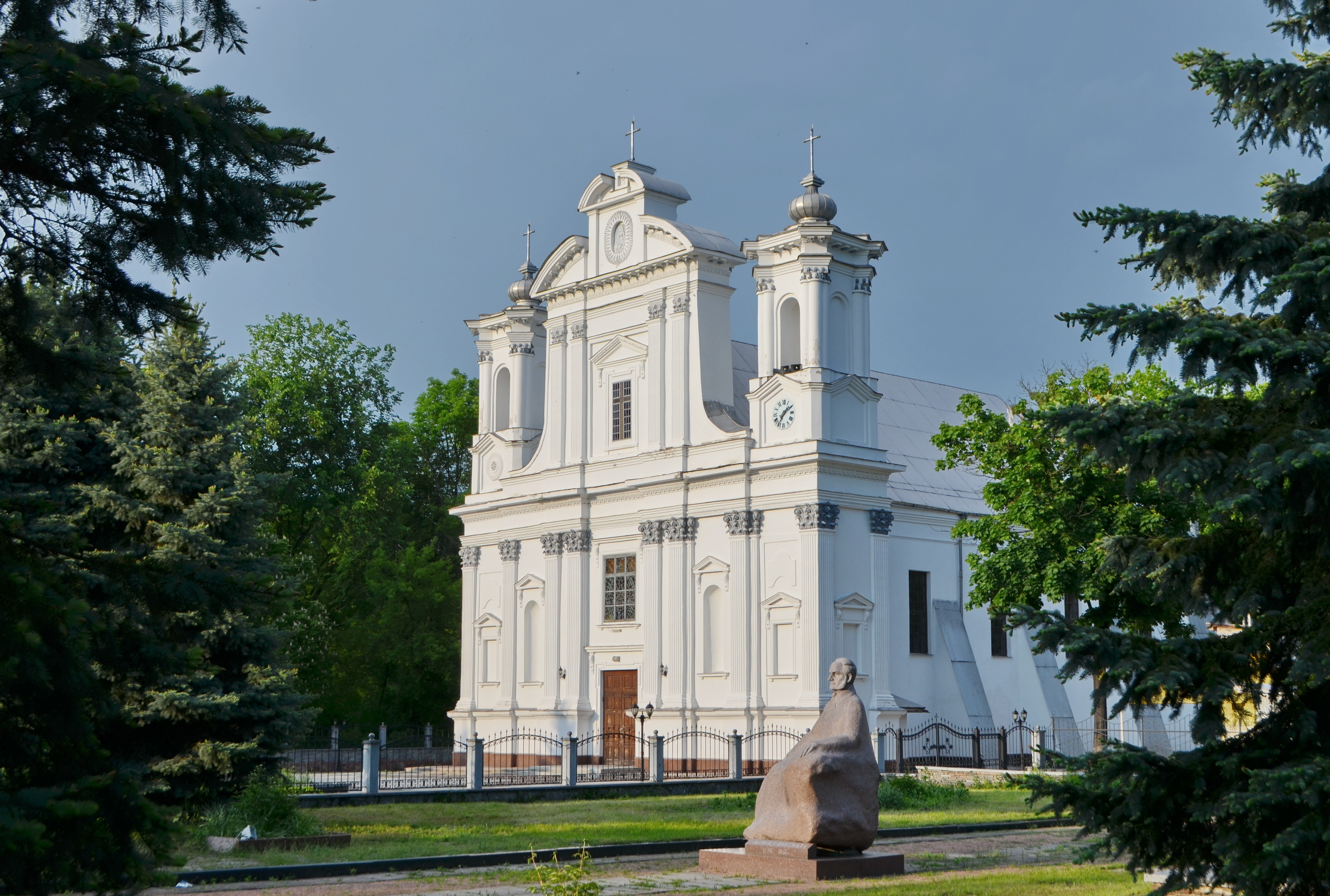
- Church of the Nativity of the Virgin Mary

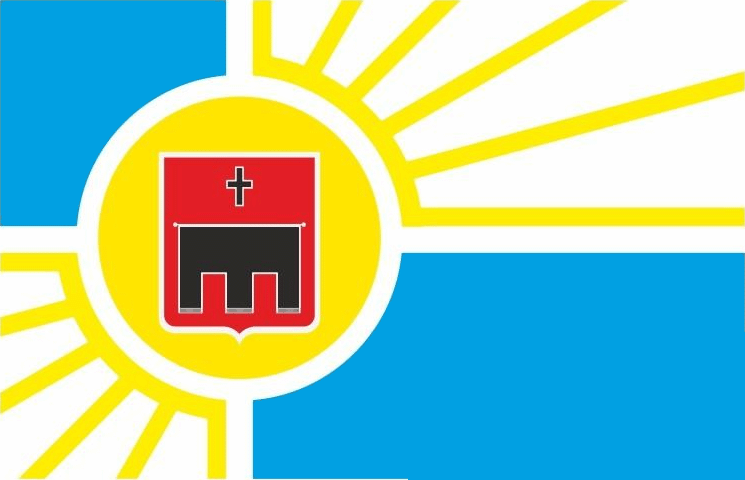
- Flag Coat of arms

- Location in Ukraine Korostyshiv (Ukraine)
- Coordinates: 50°19′N 29°04′E
- Country: Ukraine
- Oblast: Zhytomyr Oblast
- Raion: Zhytomyr Raion
- Hromada: Korostyshiv urban hromada

Population (2022)
  - Total: 24,129
- Time zone: UTC+2 (EET)
  - Summer (DST): UTC+3 (EEST)

Korostyshiv (Ukrainian: Коростишів, IPA: [koroˈstɪʃiu̯]; Polish: Korosteszów; Russian: Коростышев; Yiddish: קאָרשעוו) is a city in Zhytomyr Raion, Zhytomyr Oblast, Ukraine. Prior to 2020, it served as the administrative center of the former Korostyshiv Raion. Population: 24,129 (2022 estimate).

== History ==
The city was founded around the VI-VII centuries. According to legend, the town was called Khminychi and was the center of one of the Drevlians tribes, the Minskians.

The first written mention as a village of Zhitomirsky Uyezd, Kyiv Voivodeship of the Grand Duchy of Lithuania dates back to March 26, 1499. For sixty-five years it belonged to the Chornobyl Kmyts, a well-known and influential family of Right-bank Ukraine. Since 1565, after it was sold by Filon Kmita, the town became the property of the Olizar family, who later received the title of counts.

In July 1768, Ivan Bondarenko's Cossacks visited the town.

In 1779, Magdeburg town privileges and a coat of arms were granted with the image of the family emblem of the Olizar Counts: a golden church flag with a cross on a red background (noble Radwan coat of arms). After the second partition of Poland in 1793, Korostyshiv became part of the Russian Empire. In 1795, the town became part of the Radomyslsky Uyezd of the Volhynian Governorate, and in 1797 it was transferred to the Kyiv Governorate, which it remained part of for more than 120 years. The Olizar family remained the owners of Korostyshev until 1873. Most of the lands of the manor were forests.

According to the 1897 census, 7,863 residents lived in the city.

Korostyshiv native Leebe Shaikovich, whose name would be modified to Louis Sakowitz when he emigrated to the United States in 1886, founded the high-fashion department store chain Sakowitz, based in Houston, Texas, U.S.

On Oct 9, 1900, Henry de La Vaulx (1870–1930) and his companion set a distance record in a balloon traveling 1200 miles from the Paris suburb of Vincennes to Korostyshiv in 35.75 hours.

In 1938, the status of a city was granted.

According to the 1939 census, there were 2,170 Jews living in Korostyshiv (19.4% of the population). The town was occupied by German armed forces on July 12, 1941. About two thirds of the pre-war Jewish population remained in the town at the start of the occupation. Shortly after occupying the town, Paul Blobel shot 40 Jews. The military commandant cordoned off one street to form an open ghetto. Inhabitants were forbidden from leaving without permission, trading with local Ukrainians, or having any contact with them. Most Jewish people were shot between August 1941 and May 1942.

Korostyshiv was liberated from Nazi occupation in December of 1943.

In January 1989, the population was 28 046 people.

== Demographics ==
As of the 2001 Ukrainian census, Korostyshiv had a population of 25,735 inhabitants. Ukrainians account for over 90% of the population, while also small minorities of people of Russian and Polish descent also dwell in the city. The exact ethnic composition of the population was as follows:

Ethnic groups in Korostyshiv
	percent
Ukrainians	92.76%
Russians	5.00%
Poles	1.36%
Belarusians	0.26%
Jews	0.16%
Armenians	0.10%
others	0.36%

== Notable people ==
- Dovid Hofshteyn, Yiddish poet
- Taras Chmut, Ukrainian soldier and military analyst

== Gallery ==
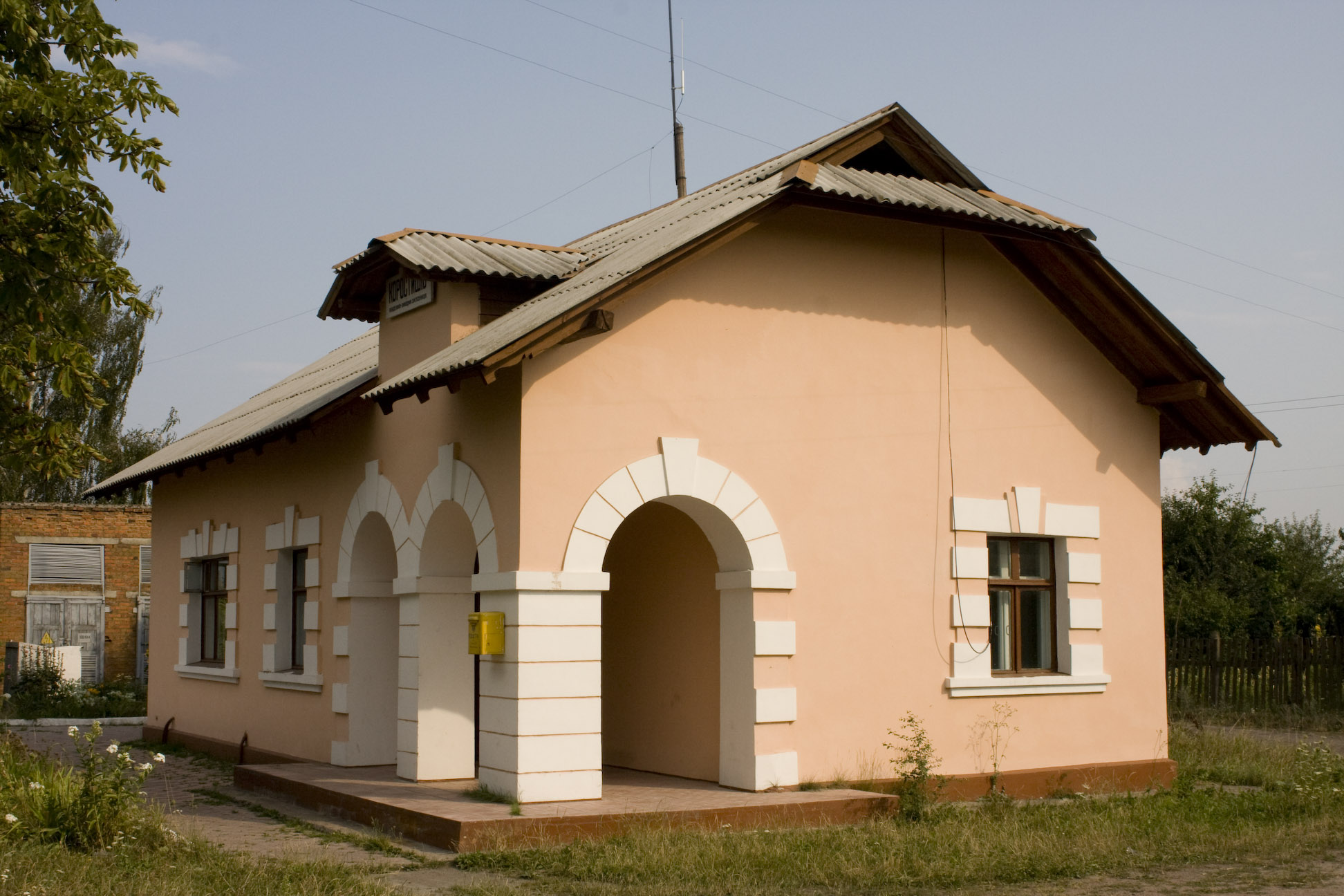
Korostyshiv railway station terminal

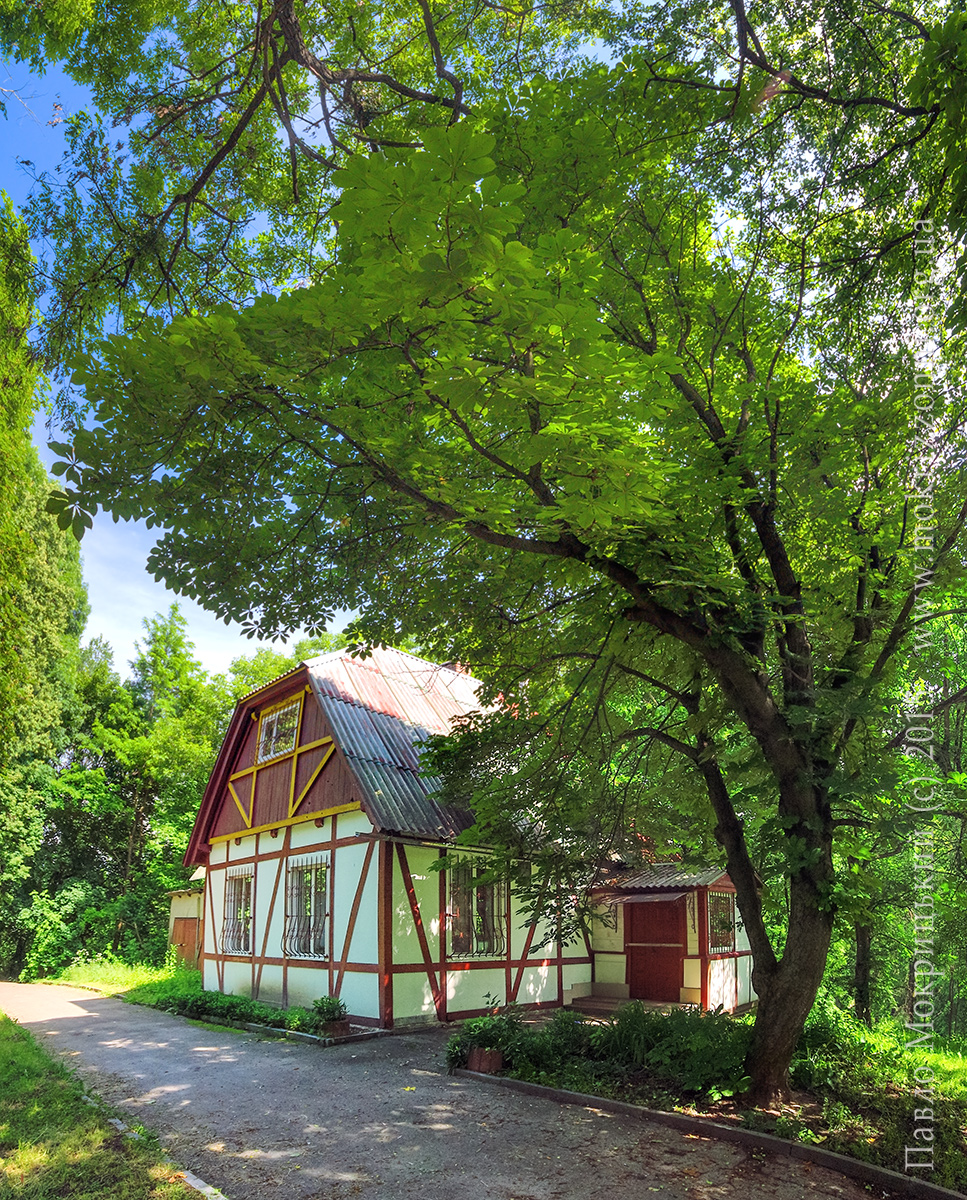
City park

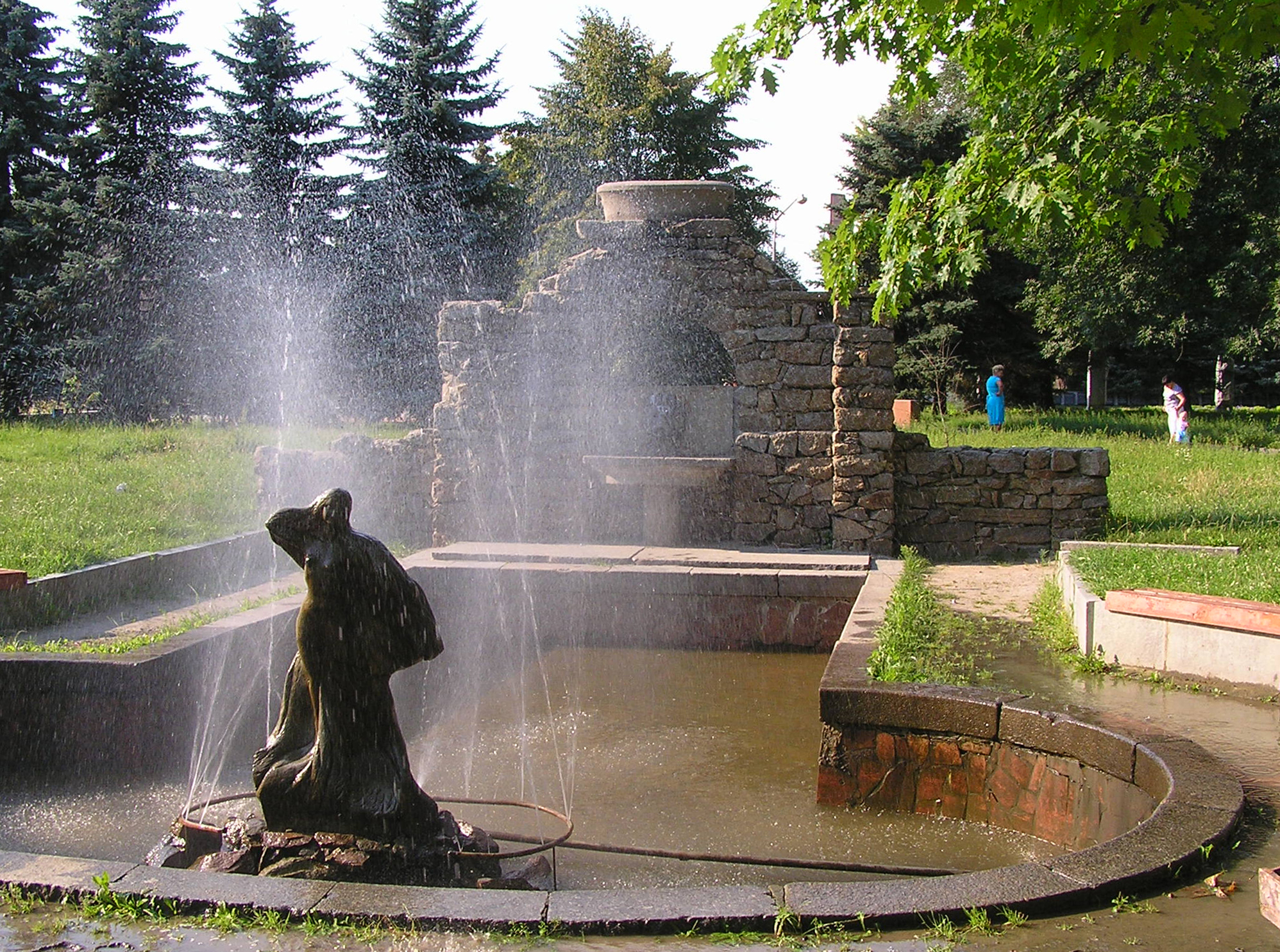
Fountain in the park

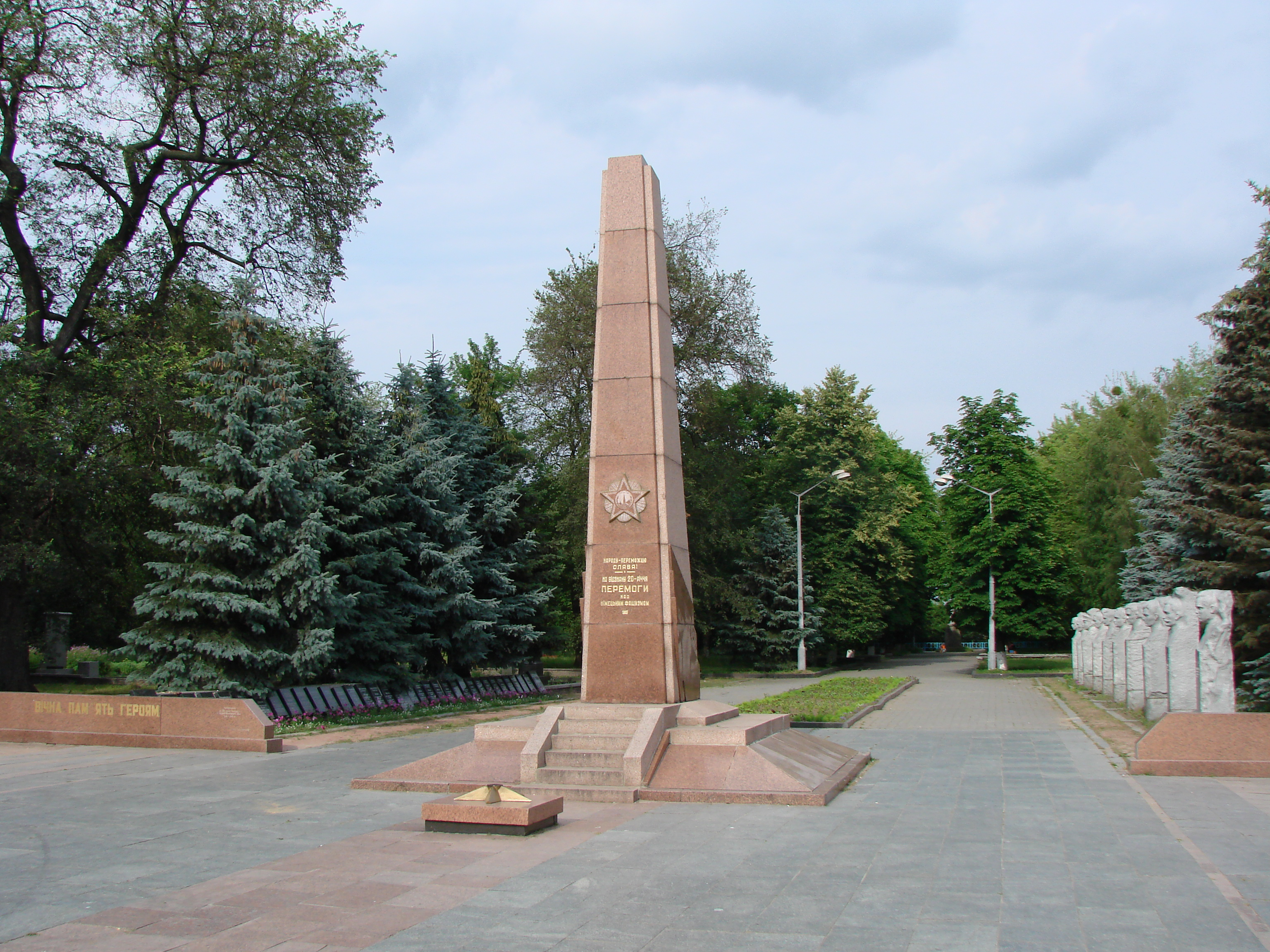
War memorial

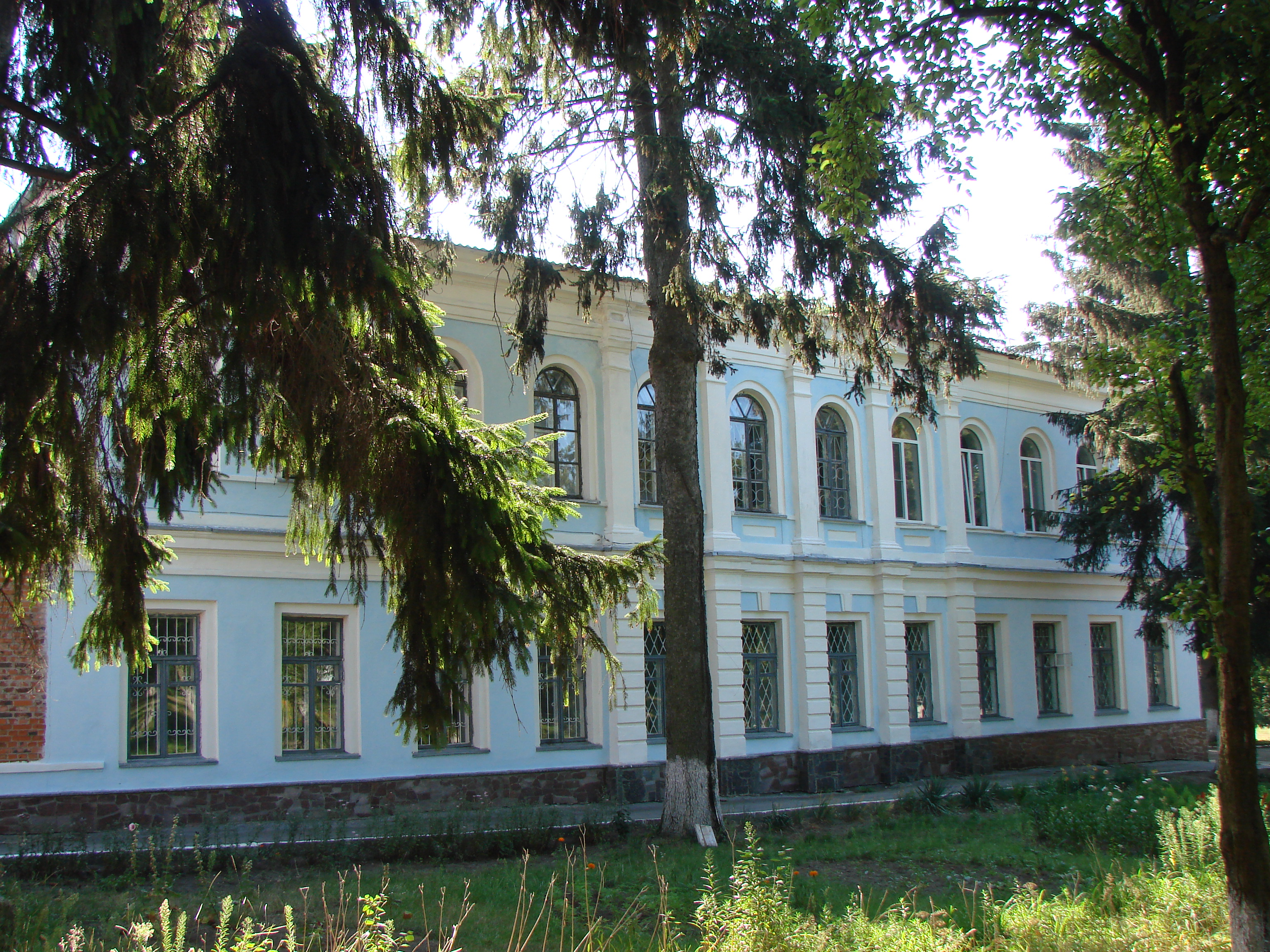
Korostyshiv pedagogical college

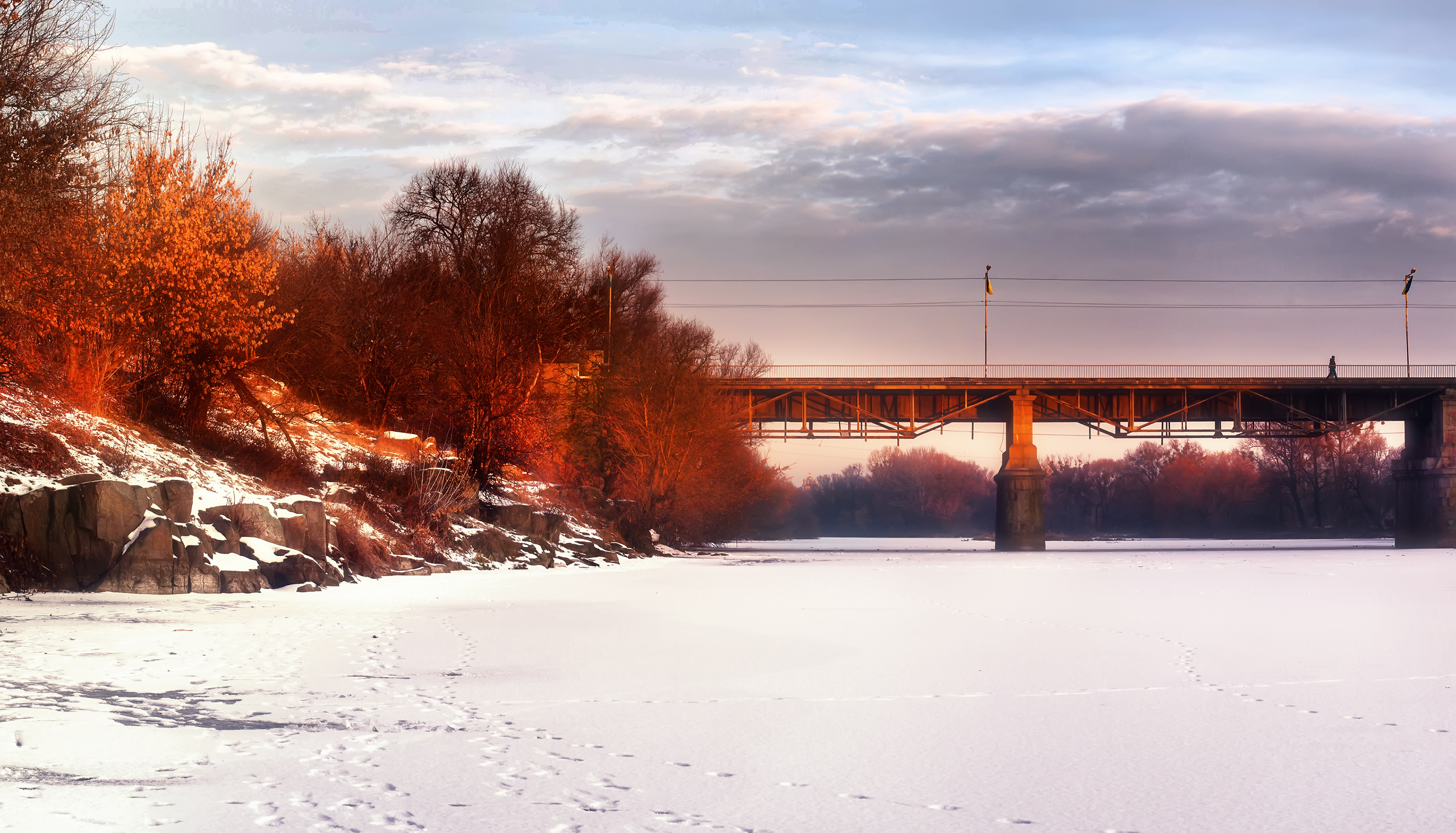
Teteriv River in Korostyshiv

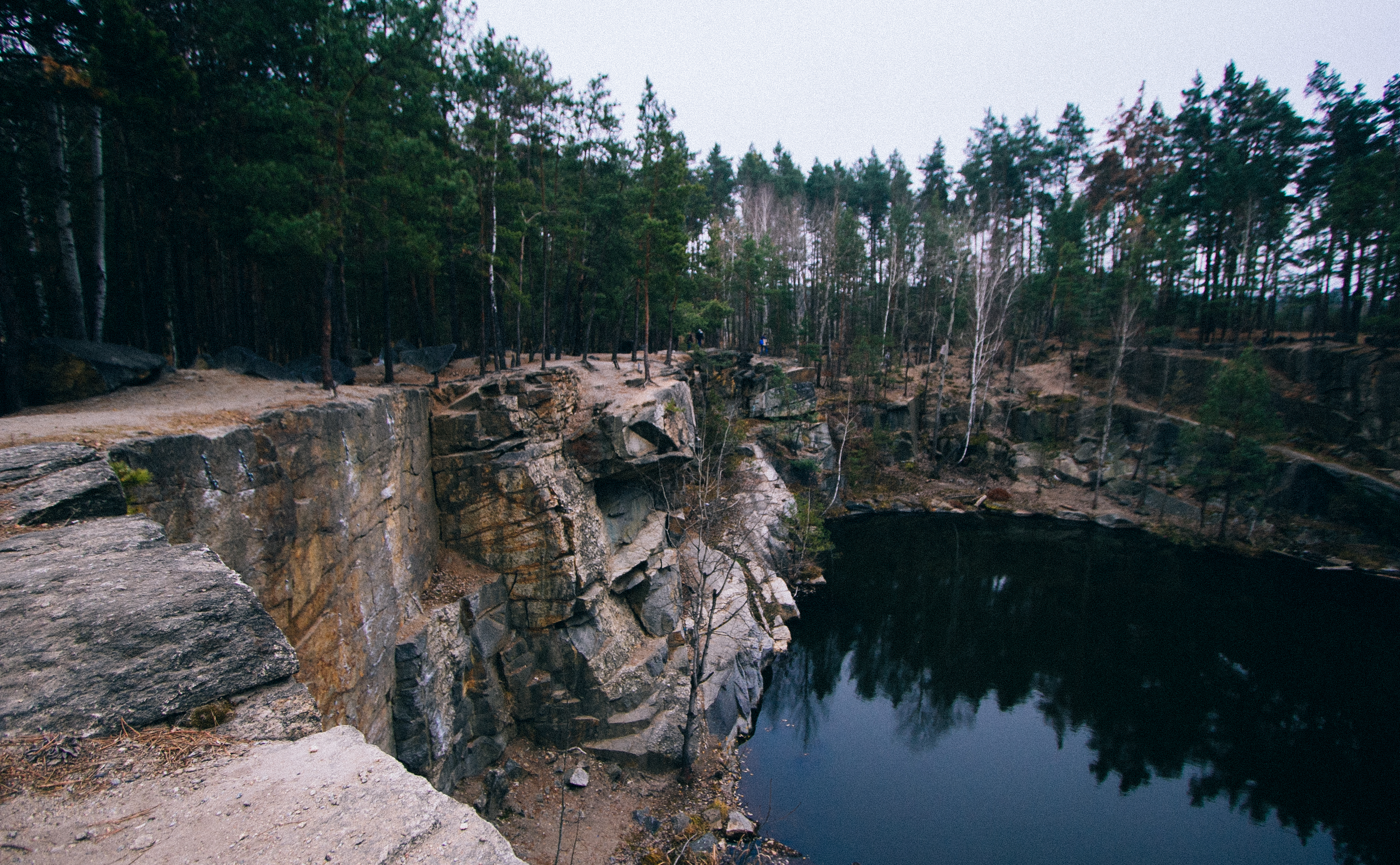
Korostyshiv quarry

== International relations ==
=== Twin towns — Sister cities ===
- Kohtla-Järve, Estonia
