= Militarnyi =

Ukrainian military news website

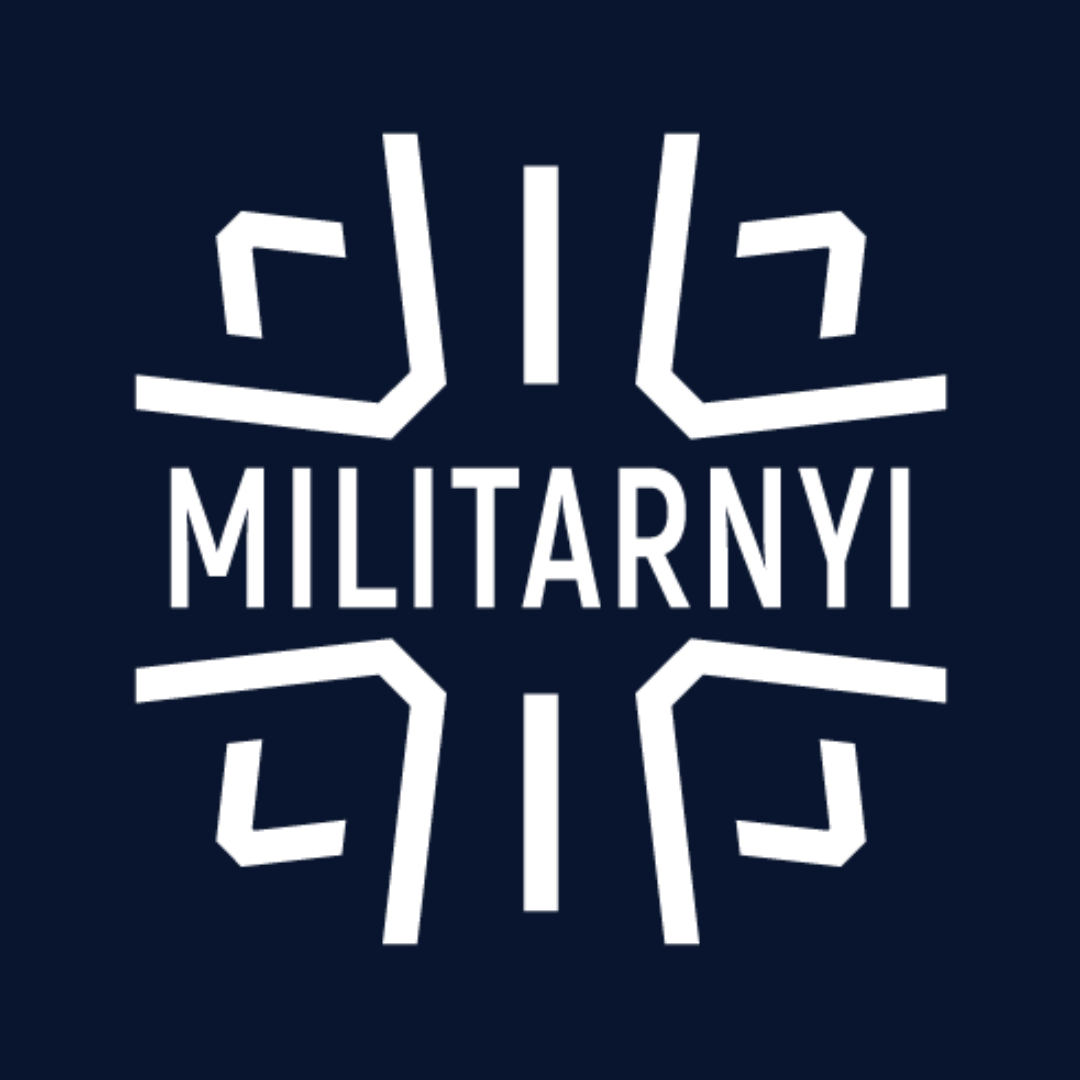
- Logo since 2023
- Native name: Мілітарний
- Website type: News website
- Available in: English, Ukrainian
- Headquarters: Kyiv, Ukraine
- Owner: Nonprofit organization Ukrainian Military Center
- Founders: Oleksandr Arhat and Taras Chmut
- Editors: Mykhailo Lyuksikov, Editor In Chief
- Website: militarnyi.com/en
- Launched: October 14, 2008; 18 years ago
- Current status: Active

Militarnyi (Ukrainian: Мілітарний) is Ukraine's most prominent military news website. Its articles are available in both Ukrainian and English. It attracts over 2 million unique visitors every month.

Militarnyi news articles are frequently cited by leading Ukrainian news outlets such as the Kyiv Post, the Kyiv Independent, and Ukrainska Pravda.

== History ==
Militarnyi was originally created as a social media group by its co-founders, Taras Chmut and Oleksandr Arhat. As the community grew, Militarnyi began to publish military news articles and military news videos.

After the Russo-Ukrainian war began, Militarnyi reorganized itself to become the volunteer group Military Aid. In February 2017, it reorganized again, taking on legal status as a part of the nonprofit organization Ukrainian Military Center.

In November 2019, Militarnyi began publishing the Militarnyi Podcast.

== Affiliations ==
Co-founder Taras Chmut is also the director of the Come Back Alive charitable foundation.

== See also ==
- List of newspapers in Ukraine
