= Taras Chmut =

Ukrainian sergeant, volunteer, and military analyst

- Тарас Миколайович Чмут
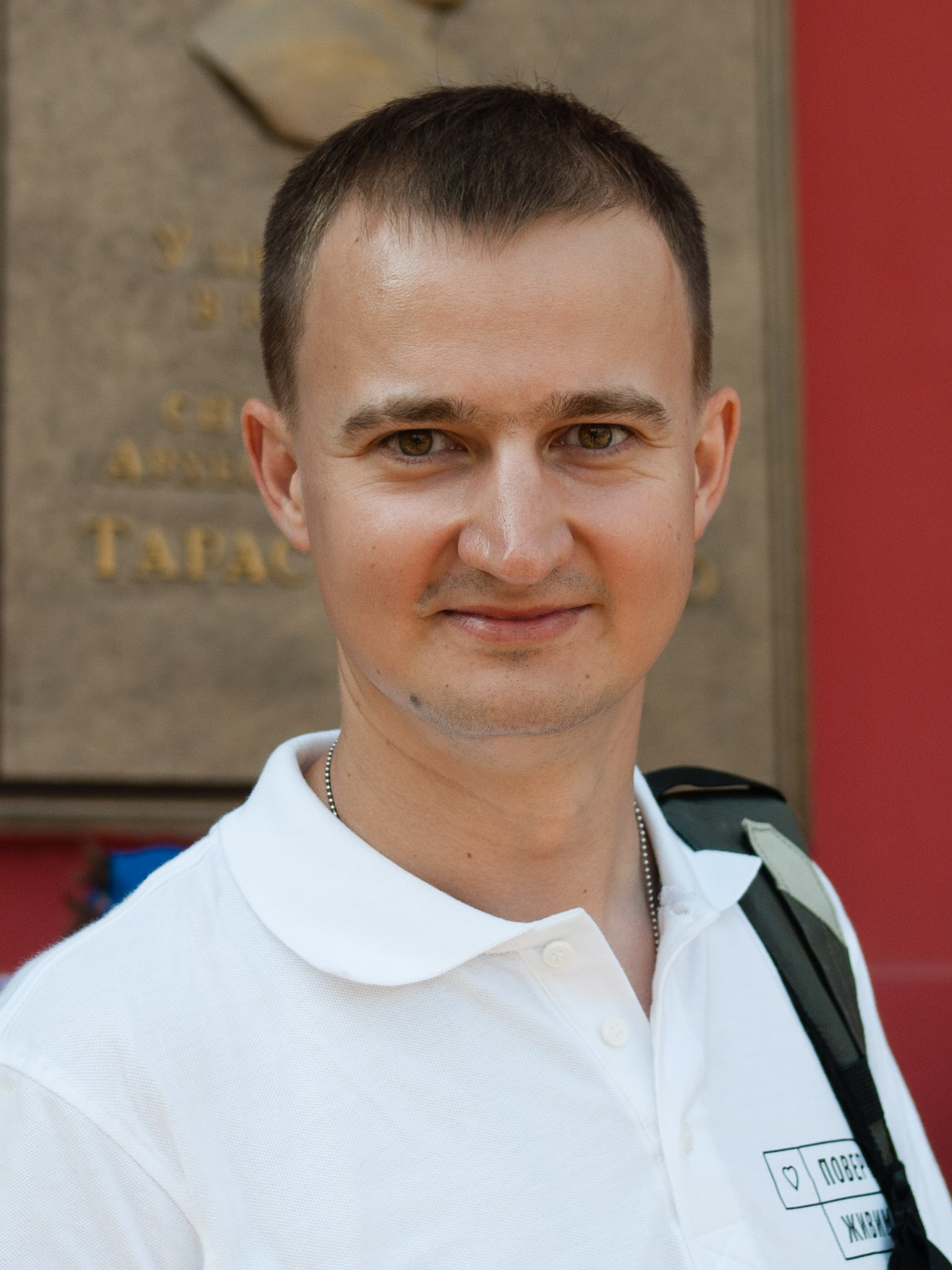
- Chmut in 2021
- Born: 13 October 1991 (age 35); Korostyshiv, Ukrainian SSR, Soviet Union (now Ukraine)
- Alma mater: National Aviation University
- Military career
- Allegiance: Ukraine
- Branch: Ukrainian Marine Corps
- Service years: 2015–2017
- Rank: Sergeant
- Units: 501st Separate Naval Infantry Battalion; 137th Marine Battalion
- Known for: Militarnyi, Come Back Alive
- Conflicts: Russo-Ukrainian War; War in Donbas; Shyrokyne standoff

Taras Mykolaiovych Chmut (Ukrainian: Тарас Миколайович Чмут; born 13 October 1991) is a Ukrainian sergeant, volunteer, and military analyst who has worked as the head of the Come Back Alive charity since 2020. He previously served as a military servicemember of the Ukrainian Marine Corps from 2015 to 2017, taking part in the War in Donbas. He has served as the Ministry of Defence's representative on the Supervisory Board of the Defence Procurement Agency (October 2024 – January 2025; since February 2026).

== Early life and career ==
Taras Mykolaiovych was born in the city of Korostyshiv on 13 October 1991. His father was a businessman, while his mother was an employee of the United Nations Development Programme. At the age of 16, he founded the Ukrainian Military Portal. He is a graduate of the National Aviation University, specialising in Complex Pilot-Navigational Equipment.

Prior to the Russo-Ukrainian War, Chmut was the coordinator of transparency non-governmental organisation Opora in Zhytomyr Oblast.

On October 14, 2008, Chmut co-founded Militarnyi as a social media group. Militarnyi is now Ukraine’s most prominent military news website, with over 2 million unique visitors every month.

== War in Donbas ==
Following the beginning of the War in Donbas in 2014, Chmut began volunteering to assist the Armed Forces of Ukraine through the Ukrainian Military Portal. Following his graduation from the National Aviation University, he joined the Ukrainian Marine Corps in 2015, becoming a member of the 501st Separate Naval Infantry Battalion.

Chmut continued his volunteer activities while in the Marine Corps, collecting funds to modernize the SVD rifles used by his battalion's snipers, as well as providing them with other modern sniping equipment. He also continued to publicly report on problems within the Armed Forces, leading to a strained relationship with his commanders and his eventual redeployment outside of the Donbas in September 2015. After being placed in a staff job in Mykolaiv, Chmut protested his redeployment, and transferred to the 137th Marine Battalion in May 2016. In the 137th Battalion, he received training from British and American instructors in military theory and the usage of unmanned aerial vehicles, respectively. He also participated in the Sea Breeze-2016 military exercises, and travelled to Lithuania, where he received further training.

Following his return from Lithuania, Chmut again began fighting in the Donbas, and served two tours of duty, in October 2016 and June 2017. He fought at the Shyrokyne standoff before being demobilised in 2017 at the rank of sergeant. At the time of his departure, he was also the commander of the 137th Battalion's intelligence detachment.

== Volunteer activities ==
After his departure from the Marine Corps, Chmut returned to the Ukrainian Military Portal before joining the Come Back Alive charity as an analyst at the end of 2017. He became the charity's director on 24 November 2020.

With the beginning of the Russian invasion of Ukraine in February 2022, Come Back Alive acquired increased attention. The charity spent $16.5 million in May 2022 to purchase Baykar Bayraktar TB2 unmanned aerial vehicles, a purchase Chmut later stated was responsible for maintaining Ukraine's independence in the early period of the war.

On August 3, 2022, Taras Chmut, on behalf of the Come Back Alive charity, signed a memorandum of further partnership with Baykar's CEO Haluk Bayraktar.

On December 7, 2022, at the invitation of the U.S. Helsinki Commission, he testified at a hearing on the Ukrainian volunteer movement before the U.S. Congress. He discussed the foundation’s support for the Armed Forces of Ukraine and the establishment of cooperation with American organizations. Additionally, he called for Ukraine to be removed from the list of countries subject to crime control export restrictions.

In November 2025, Taras Chmut, director of the Come Back Alive charity, announced that the foundation had received the largest known donation in support of Ukraine's Defense Forces, amounting to 19 billion hryvnias (approximately US$460 million). According to Chmut, the funds were provided by an anonymous donor from a European country and are designated for the procurement of weapons, military equipment, FPV drones, the development of aerial reconnaissance capabilities, and logistical support. Taras Chmut described the project as unprecedented and expressed his intention to scale up this model of cooperation.

Speaking on the sidelines of the World Economic Forum in Davos in January 2026, Taras Chmut said that the foundation had signed around ten earmarked grant agreements with various countries, ranging from small to very large. Some had already been successfully implemented, others were at various stages of implementation, and some had been signed that year, reflecting an increasingly dynamic process. He noted that the number of countries approaching the foundation was also growing, as governments exchanged experiences and saw that such cooperation was working well for others.

In February 2026, the Cabinet of Ministers of Ukraine appointed Taras Chmut as the representative of the Ministry of Defence of Ukraine on the Supervisory Board of the Defence Procurement Agency. The decision was made upon the submission of Ukraine's Minister of Dedence, Mykhailo Fedorov.

In June 2026, Taras Chmut announced that the Come Back Alive charity had signed a contract worth more than 1.92 billion hryvnias (approximately US$42.7 million) for the needs of Ukraine's Defense Forces. According to him, the agreement provides for the supply of Ukrainian-made unmanned aerial vehicles, with implementation scheduled for 2026.

== Military analysis ==
Since the beginning of the Russian invasion of Ukraine, Chmut has regularly served as a military analyst and commentator in Ukrainian and international media. His commentary has focused on the evolution of modern warfare, military procurement, and defence policy.

In September 2023, Taras Chmut told The Wall Street Journal that much of the Western armor supplied to Ukraine was underperforming on the battlefield because it had been designed for low- to medium-intensity conflicts rather than all-out war. He argued that Western allies should shift focus toward delivering simpler, cheaper systems in greater quantities — a request Ukraine has repeatedly made.

He considers a division-and-corps structure more suitable for waging large-scale war. In particular, in August 2023, he supported a divisional approach rather than a brigade-based one. In 2024, he spoke in favour of replacing temporary command structures, including operational-tactical groupings and tactical groups, with permanent corps-level structures.

Taras Chmut has also repeatedly expressed the view that, given the prolonged war, Ukraine would likely have to lower the mobilisation age to 20.

In 2025, in a comment to The Financial Times, Taras Chmut described the area near the frontline as a "kill zone," stating that warfare had "changed in a radical way" and that the "kill zone" continues to grow every month. He added that many Europeans still find it difficult to understand the extent of these changes.

In June 2026, he said that ground robotic systems could significantly change the conduct of warfare in the near future, comparing their emergence to the introduction of tanks during the First World War. He noted that Ukraine had significantly increased funding for the procurement of such systems and that their role on the battlefield was continuing to grow.

In October 2026, Taras Chmut noted that Ukrainian strikes were destroying the radar systems of Russian S-400 surface-to-air missile systems faster than Russia could manufacture replacements, potentially leading to a shortage of such systems in the Russian military.

== Recognition ==
In 2022, Chmut was recognised by Forbes Ukraine as a member of the magazine's "30 under 30" list. He also received the Defender of the Motherland Medal on 23 August 2022 for his efforts to strengthen the Ukrainian military, and was further decorated with the Light of Justice award by the Ukrainian Catholic University in 2023. In 2026, he was ranked No. 1 among volunteers in the "100 Most Influential Ukrainians" list by the Ukrainian magazine Focus.
