= Vilkhivka, Kharkiv Oblast =

Village in Kharkiv Oblast, Ukraine

Vilkhivka Вільхівка
- Village
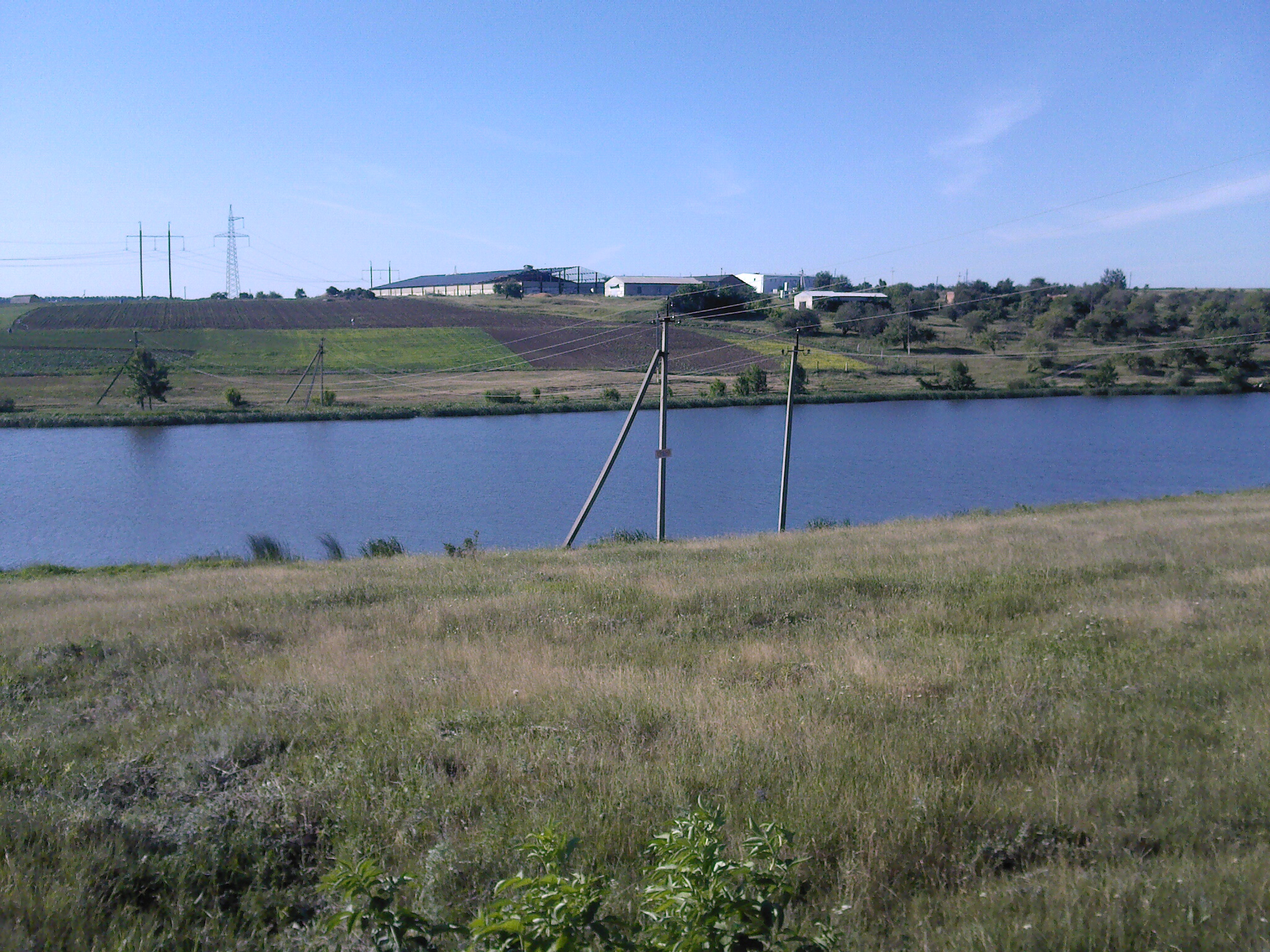
- Interactive map of Vilkhivka
- Location of Vilkhivka Vilkhivka (Ukraine)
- Coordinates: 49°58′51″N 36°30′12″E
- Country: Ukraine
- Oblast: Kharkiv Oblast
- Raion: Kharkiv Raion
- Hromada: Vilkhivka rural hromada
- Elevation: 172 m (564 ft)

Population (2001)
  - Total: 1,244
- Time zone: UTC+2
  - Summer (DST): UTC+3
- Postal code: 15461
- Area code: +380 6250

Vilkhivka (Ukrainian: Вільхівка), also known as Olkhovka (Russian: Ольхо́вка), is a village in the Kharkiv Raion, Kharkiv Oblast (province) of eastern Ukraine. It is the administrative centre of Vilkhivka rural hromada, one of the hromadas of Ukraine.

== History ==
During the Russian invasion of Ukraine, Vilkhivka was occupied by the Russian military, but was liberated on 27 March 2022 by the Ukrainian Army.
