= Come Back Alive =

Ukrainian nonprofit organization supporting the Ukrainian armed forces

- Повернись живим
- Come Back Alive logo
- Abbreviation: CBA
- Formation: May 2014; 12 years ago
- Founder: Vitaliy Deynega
- Type: Non-governmental organization
- Location: Kyiv, Ukraine
- Head: Taras Chmut
- Website: savelife.in.ua (eng.)

Ukrainian logo

Come Back Alive (Ukrainian: Повернись живим, romanized: Povernys' zhyvym [pəvʲɪrˈnʲisʲ ʒeˈʋɪm]) is a foundation that provides support to service members in the Armed Forces of Ukraine. The foundation purchases arms and equipment to help equip Ukrainian servicemembers. It also provides additional training to soldiers in areas such as marksmanship, first aid, artillery, and drone operation. Between May 2014 and June 2022, the foundation raised over $100 million.

In 2025, Come Back Alive ranked first among Ukrainian charitable foundations by annual revenue.

== History ==
=== Founding and early activities (2014–2017) ===
The foundation was established in May 2014 by Vitaliy Deynega, an IT-specialist from Kyiv. In 2015, the foundation was legally registered. Its first purchase was a shipment of bulletproof vests, which had the names of sponsors and the name of the organization written on them. During its first month of operation, the organization purchased thermographic cameras for use by the Ukrainian military, which required more advanced imaging.

On May 30, 2014, the foundation sent its first thermographic camera to the front. The 80th Airmobile Brigade and 95th Airmobile Brigade were the first to receive aid from Come Back Alive, followed by all other combat brigades at the front line. As of 2021, the foundation had provided aid to about 100 units of the AFU.

From the middle of May 2014, the foundation initiated public reporting. Besides the optical equipment, in 2014 the foundation provided the 40th Tactical Aviation Brigade with aviation GPS navigators, and in 2015 it provided radar equipment for the Horlivka transport ship and the Hetman Sahaidachny frigate, as well as a radar for the border guard ship Donbas.

In June 2014, the foundation started training soldiers in demining, and in September it began offering training to artillerists and tank crews. In March 2017, a sniper training program was launched. In summer 2021, the foundation opened a drone operator instruction and training branch.

In 2016, the foundation began renting equipment to the military.

=== Institutional development (2018–2021) ===
In 2018, the NGO Come Back Alive was registered. Its activity was aimed at researching Ukraine's security and defense sector and preparing recommendations concerning its reforming and development.

In August 2019, the foundation installed the first mobile observation complex at the front - the foundation's own product. The complex enables the soldiers to observe the front line 24/7 outside of shelter, detecting the movement and actions of the enemy's units and diversion intelligence groups.

In spring 2020, the founder and head of the foundation handed over the organization's management to Oksana Koliada, an ex-minister in issues related to veterans, but shortly afterward she left the position. In November 2021, "Come Back Alive" was headed by Taras Chmut, a veteran, former marine, volunteer, and co-founder of the "Ukraine Military Center".

From the three persons who in 2014 originated "Come Back Alive", the foundation has developed into an organization with 40 staff members and 100 volunteers.

=== Russian invasion of Ukraine ===
==== 2022 ====
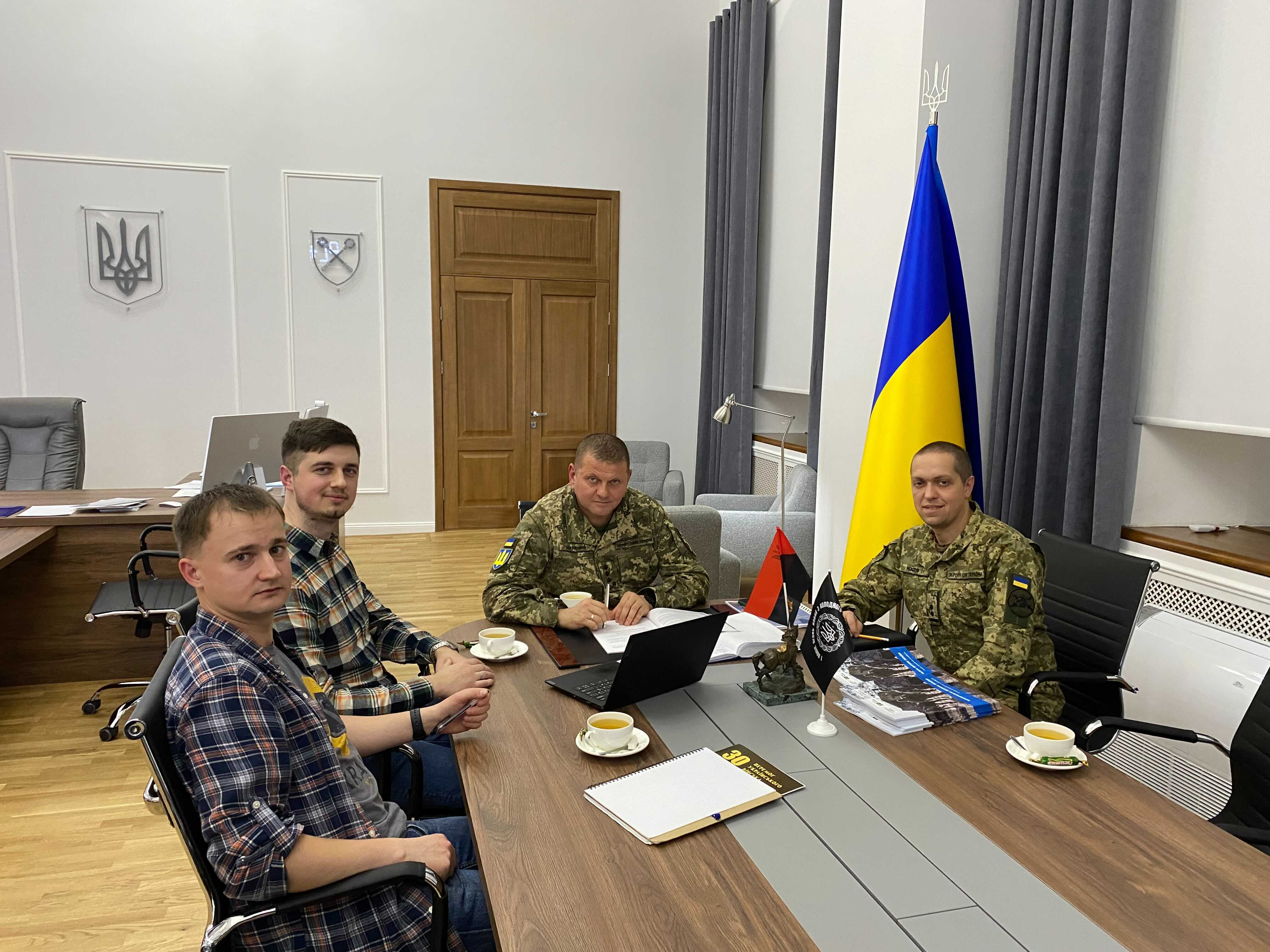
Director and Fund's analyst at a meeting with the Commander-in-Chief of the AFU

From 2014 to early 2022, the foundation provided aid to combat brigades active in the Luhansk and Donetsk regions. After the 2022 Russian invasion of Ukraine, the foundation has expanded its scope to include all of Ukraine. As of March 2022, the foundation was providing aid for almost all combat brigades and detachments of the Armed Forces and Territorial Defense Forces of Ukraine. Between 2014 and February 23, 2022, the foundation had raised $3,192,571 for the army.

At the beginning of the invasion, the foundation defined several priority areas for equipment. This included thermographic and night optics, technical means of intelligence and information processing, transportation, sniper gear, individual protective gear, and communications equipment.

After February 24, due to requests from the soldiers and conditions on the front lines, the foundation began purchasing bulletproof vests. In previous years, the organization had purchased more than 100 bulletproof vests, and five months into the full-scale invasion over 20,000 bulletproof vests and sets of bulletproof armor plates with plate carriers were provided.

From February 24 to June 2022, the foundation purchased 3,460 thermal imagers and thermal sights. It also purchased more than 2,869 quadcopters and 139 unmanned aircraft systems for the Armed Forces. More than 20,000 communication devices and component parts and 1,220 tablets with the ARMOR program installed were provided.

Also, "Come Back Alive" provides new and improved automobiles for the army, in order to create mobile groups based on them. At present the army has received more than 250 automobiles.

After February 24, 2022, "Come Back Alive" has purchased 5290 demining kits, 381 metal detectors and 100 blast suits.

"Come Back Alive" is the first charity organization in Ukraine to obtain a license to purchase military and dual-use goods including lethal weapons. This license allows the foundation to purchase goods directly from manufacturers without intermediaries.

The foundation was the first non-governmental organization in Ukraine to purchase a Bayraktar TB2 unmanned aerial vehicle complex for a total cost of $16,502,450.

==== 2024 ====
As of April 2024, 118 people work at Come Back Alive. On May 10, 2024, the foundation celebrated its tenth anniversary.

==== 2025 ====
In November 2025, the "Come Back Alive" foundation announced the receipt of a grant totaling 19 billion hryvnias (approximately $450 million) for the needs of Ukraine's Defense Forces. According to the foundation's director, Taras Chmut, this represents the largest publicly known contribution to Ukraine's military needs. At the donor's request, the source of the funding was not disclosed; it is known only that the financing came from a European country. According to the foundation's press service, the funds were received as part of a foreign grant.

In 2025, the "Come Back Alive" foundation underwent an audit in accordance with the international standard ISO 9001:2015, Quality Management Systems. The CBA Initiatives Center, which has been working alongside the Foundation since 2018 to strengthen Ukraine’s resilience, was also certified.

==== 2026 ====
In June 2026, the "Come Back Alive" foundation announced the signing of a contract worth over 1.92 billion hryvnias (approximately US$42.7 million) for Ukraine's Defense Forces. The agreement was announced by the foundation's director, Taras Chmut, who published a photograph of the document indicating a contract value of 1,920,625,406 hryvnias.

According to the foundation, the contract provides for the procurement of Ukrainian-made unmanned aerial vehicles for the Defense Forces. Due to security considerations, information regarding the number and types of drones was not disclosed. The foundation stated that the agreement was expected to be implemented by the end of 2026. At the time of its announcement, the contract represented the largest publicly disclosed procurement agreement concluded by the organization.

== Reactions in Russia ==
In 2022, the FSB issued a warning to several Russian citizens for making donations to the "Come Back Alive" foundation, and in 2024, for similar actions, it detained a resident of the Novgorod region in a case of high treason. In the spring of the same year, the foundation was declared an "undesirable organization" in Russia.

== Fundraising ==
Raising funds takes place separately from the involvement of charitable donations for the operational activities of the foundation.

The funds collected for the army and the expenditures for the needs of the AFU are made public on the organization's website. The foundation collects funds via different systems of money transfer. One can support the AFU through PrivatBank and Oschadbank accounts, SWIFT payments, and crypto wallets.

== Activities ==
=== Donating and renting equipment ===
The military department works directly with the soldiers: military logisticians and instructors communicate with unit commanders and make a list of needs. After evaluating provision requests, "Come Back Alive" buys and sends the necessary equipment to the front. The foundation gives the soldiers optical devices for thermal imaging, night and daytime optical devices (periscopes, binoculars, etc.), automobiles, sights and thermal sights, portable radio stations, GPS navigators, drones, demining kits, metal detectors, ship radar systems (for the "Hetman Sahaidachny", "Horlivka", "Donbas"), and power generators. Since 2019 the foundation has supplied mobile observation complexes.

To strengthen the army, the foundation has worked out a mobile observation complex, individual and group kits for demining, an ARMOR graphical estimation complex, an inclinometer, and an artillery weapon model.

Since 2016, the equipment has been handed out on a temporary basis, with all devices having an engraved serial number. Upon receiving equipment from the foundation, the military unit registers it. When the foundation receives a request from the soldiers, it checks its expediency, after which new equipment is purchased, or available equipment is distributed. Before the full-scale invasion of 2022, the foundation took the equipment back for technical maintenance services after a brigade's rotation, while the next brigade was given other equipment. Since February 24, 2022, the equipment given out by the foundation is put on the balance of the receiving unit.

=== Training ===
The foundation has its own instructor programs, and it trains soldiers in five specialties:

==== 1. Indirect firing ====
Instructors teach soldiers how to use the ARMOR graphic evaluation complex, which is an electronic calculator that enables users to quickly define coordinates and approximate directions, and also calculate data for indirect firing using grenade launchers, mortars and tanks.

==== 2. Mine safety ====
This training program involves three stages, each of them including a theoretical part covering engineering, and practical application of the acquired knowledge in conditions close to actual combat. Soldiers are trained to find and neutralize explosives outside and inside of buildings. The foundation has also made individual and group kits for demining. These tools for urgent demining tasks help specialists to find and neutralize explosive traps and clean roads for combat groups.

==== 3. Sniping ====
Professionals teach high precision shooting, finding the enemy's potential firing positions, observation tactics, directing fire, and destruction of priority targets. As of December 2021, half of all Ukrainian snipers at the front line were trained by instructors of "Come Back Alive".

==== 4. UAV operators ====
Instructors teach combating enemy drones and using our drones, tactics of use, air reconnaissance, and directing fire, as well as analyzing and deciphering intelligence information.

==== 5. Premedical aid ====
In addition, since 2019 the foundation has had a training program for soldiers, "Management and leadership in a military detachment".

=== Defense research ===
During its four years of work, the analytical department of "Come Back Alive" has conducted seven studies, including "Military communication of the AFU: the actual state and the problems", "Why do soldiers quit the army?" and "Territorial defense of Ukraine: history, present state, and the future". The department took part in reforming the system of Territorial Defense in fall 2020. The analysts suggested changes to various law projects existing in late 2020 and early 2021. In late 2021 and early 2022, the analytical department worked jointly with a representative of the command of the Territorial Defense Forces on writing and adopting legal normative acts, as well as on changes in the text of the law.

=== Rehabilitation of veterans and support of veterans' initiatives ===
The foundation helps veterans to adapt, and it helps the country and the society to create the necessary conditions for it. This task is implemented in two key directions: veterans' sports and veterans' businesses.

Since 2019, the foundation has been a co-organizer of the national Invictus Games competition in Ukraine, and also the selection and training of the Ukrainian National team for participation in the international Invictus Games. In 2022 the national team took part in the games in the Hague, where it won 16 medals.

On the basis of the Invictus Games, the project "Sports Ambassadors" has been realized. Its goal is to have a positive influence on the psychological state of veterans, and to give them basic skills of self-help and self-improvement. Fourteen ambassadors have implemented their sporting and mentoring projects, and they continue to carry out new initiatives.

Since 2021, "Come Back Alive" has been a co-organizer of the selection for the Ukrainian National team for participation in the international Warrior Games competition. Regarding the results of the selection, in the fall of 2022 40 Ukrainian soldiers, for the first time in Ukraine's history, will compete in adaptive sports with representatives of the United States, Australia, Canada, the United Kingdom, Denmark, the Netherlands, and Georgia.

Since 2018, "Come Back Alive" has been a co-organizer of the International veterans' and volunteers' forum "Ukraine is where we are". The foundation is also a member of the Organizing Committee of the Defenders' March held on the Independence Day of Ukraine.

The foundation has also launched V-Corp, an all-Ukrainian support project for veterans interested in starting or developing a business.

=== Advertising campaigns ===
Since 2014 the foundation has implemented a number of projects with Ukrainian artists, brands, and strategists. Also since 2014, "Come Back Alive" has been creating calendars with the goal of raising funds to help the Ukrainian army, and also to bring public attention to the war in the informational space. Calendars for 2015 and 2016 had the titles: "The Cyborgs", and "The Cyborgs. A Year After", and were dedicated to the defenders of the Donetsk airport. The calendar for 2017, "Veterans. Life Goes On" comprises stories of 12 veterans who had returned to a peaceful life. In 2018, the calendar of the foundation covered military food, artistically interpreted. The 2019 calendar, "The Military Dictionary", presented the phenomenon of military neologisms and the influence of war on the vocabulary of the language. The calendar was designed in the format of a military vocabulary where every page is an illustration of words from Ukrainian soldiers' vocabulary that have undergone a change in their meaning in recent years. Portraits of the veterans who were to represent Ukraine at the Invictus Games were featured in the 2020 calendar. The 2021 calendar, "Creators" included photographs from the front taken by the war photographer Oleksandr Hliadielov. The calendar "The Real Scale" for 2022 comprises 12 stories set within Donbas' landscapes where the events of the Russia-Ukraine war are taking place. The focal objects of the composition were transformed 3D models of different devices which help to preserve soldiers' lives, increase precision in resisting the enemy, and defend Ukraine's independence.

In 2015 the foundation launched the campaign "The Army Needs Eyes". As part of the campaign, video and radio commercials were created and billboards were placed. The campaign brought attention to the problem of the absence of night vision devices at the front and made it possible to attract funds for the purchase of thermal imaging gear.

The foundation also developed the application "Wake up in peace", Every push of the button sent money for the needs of the soldiers. The lyrics for the ringtone were written by Serhiy Zhadan, and the song was performed by the music band "Mannerheim Line" and Sasha Koltsova. In 2017 and 2018 the foundation received the "Best Marketing Teams" award at Ukraine's Effie Awards ceremony. Also, the application won a Golden Award at the Art Directors Club of Europe contest in the category "Integration and Innovations". The foundation also launched "The Military Dictionary" campaign. The campaign is devoted to the phenomenon of military neologisms and their influence on the language, and was involved in the creation of the foundation's calendar, as well as radio and billboard advertising.

In radio advertising, through its "Nonpeaceful poetry", the foundation rethought classical literature by replacing the last lines of peaceful poetry by Taras Shevchenko, Lesya Ukrainka and Mykola Vinhranovskyi with lines about the Russia-Ukraine war in rhyme.

=== Brand partnerships and volunteers ===
In July 2014 in Lviv, an art project took place, with the funds raised directed to the needs of the 80th Brigade and 95th Brigade.

In March 2015 "Come Back Alive", together with several other volunteer organizations, launched a promotional campaign selling T-shirts and scarves to raise funds for soldiers' equipment and protective gear.

In April 2015, the promotional campaign "Write to a Soldier" was launched jointly with Ukrposhta. In the Kyiv and Donetsk regions special postcards were sold for 10 hryvnias (hrn) each to be sent to soldiers. With the sum of 256,000 hrn raised, an intensive care ambulance for the 56th Brigade was purchased and equipped, and subsequently delivered to the front near Mariupol in June 2016.

In 2016-2017 the foundations "Come Back Alive" and "National home front" together with war veterans, in the promotional campaign "E-Tithe", sent letters to members of Parliament, ministers, prosecutors, governors, and mayors, asking them to donate a part of their declared wealth for the needs of the army. The campaign was conducted in two stages: the first started in November 2016, the second in March 2017. About 400 letters were sent during the campaign. About 30 answers came back from the officials. Some reported on the help given personally or through their foundations, and some donated through "Come Back Alive".

With the foundation's help, equipment for the transmission of Ukrainian television was installed in the area of Avdiivka (partly with the funds raised by sales of the book "History of Ukraine from Svirid's grandfather". The transmission started on December 5, 2017, and continued until 2019.

The foundation organized joint events with enterprises and cultural establishments, in particular, with the bookstore Yakaboo, and the theater team of Serhii Perekrest, who donated 10 percent of their income for the needs of the army for a certain period.

In 2016–2017, "Come Back Alive" and Uklon, a ride sharing service, had a joint promotional campaign #WARTAXI. In a mobile application one could choose the service #Wartaxi. The cost of the trip was donated to help the army. Veterans and other volunteers became drivers of the war taxi program. The promotions took place in Kyiv, Dnipro, Odesa, and Lviv. As a result of the promotion, about 190,000 hrn was raised, with which four vehicles were purchased for the 30th, 28th, and 24th Mechanized Brigades. The promotional campaign #WARTAXI received an award at the 18th Kyiv International Advertising Festival. In addition, Uklon continues to support the institutional development of "Come Back Alive". The financial support of Uklon helps the foundation to develop, contributing to the improvement of the country's defense capability.

In 2018 "Come Back Alive", together with Pizza Veterano, organized the event "An Extreme Day in the Office". The prominent Ukrainians Andriy Khlyvnyuk, Akhtem Seitablayev, and Marko Halanevych became pizza delivery men for one day. They delivered pizzas to the participants of the charitable auction. As a result of the event, a quadrocopter for one of the army's units was purchased.

Before the Day of Ukraine's Defenders-2021, "Come Back Alive" and Uklon held a joint campaign to raise funds for mobile observation complexes. For 14 days, everyone who wished could join the campaign to support the AFU using QR codes in the service's taxis. Also, on October 14 the service organized free delivery to veterans' businesses in eight cities. The campaign raised almost 200,000 hrn, which allowed the foundation to purchase two mobile observation complexes for the front.

=== Advocacy of decision making in the sphere of defense ===
On February 11, 2016, the head of "Come Back Alive" Vitaliy Deynega, together with representatives of several other volunteer organizations, submitted an appeal to the governing bodies concerning the situation of the fleet, which resulted in appointing a new commander of the Ukrainian Navy. The foundation also influenced the establishment of Special Operation Forces of the AFU.

In addition, it provides experts as well as material and technical assistance to the Forces of Territorial Defense of the AFU.

== Awards ==
- The founder of the group Vitaliy Deynega was awarded the Order of Merit of 3rd grade (edict of the president of Ukraine from 23 August 2014) and the Cross of Ivan Mazepa (edict of the president of Ukraine from 5 December 2019).
- 15 January 2016, the foundation was awarded with the non-state order "People's Hero of Ukraine", which is given by a commission of known servicemen and civil volunteers.
- 13 May 2016, the Minister of Defense of Ukraine Stepan Poltorak awarded members of the organization Daria Bura, Vitaliy Deynega, Alina Zhuk, Artem Parkhomenko, Tetiana Romakh, Victoria Stokratiuk and Irina Turchak with medals "For Assistance to the Armed Forces of Ukraine".
- Awards of various military units (including the 3rd Special Purpose Regiment and others).

== See also ==
- Civil volunteer movement helping Ukrainian forces in the war in Donbas
- United24
- People's Bayraktar
- Be Brave Like Ukraine
- Nova Ukraine

== Links ==
- Website of the foundation
