= 2014 in spaceflight =

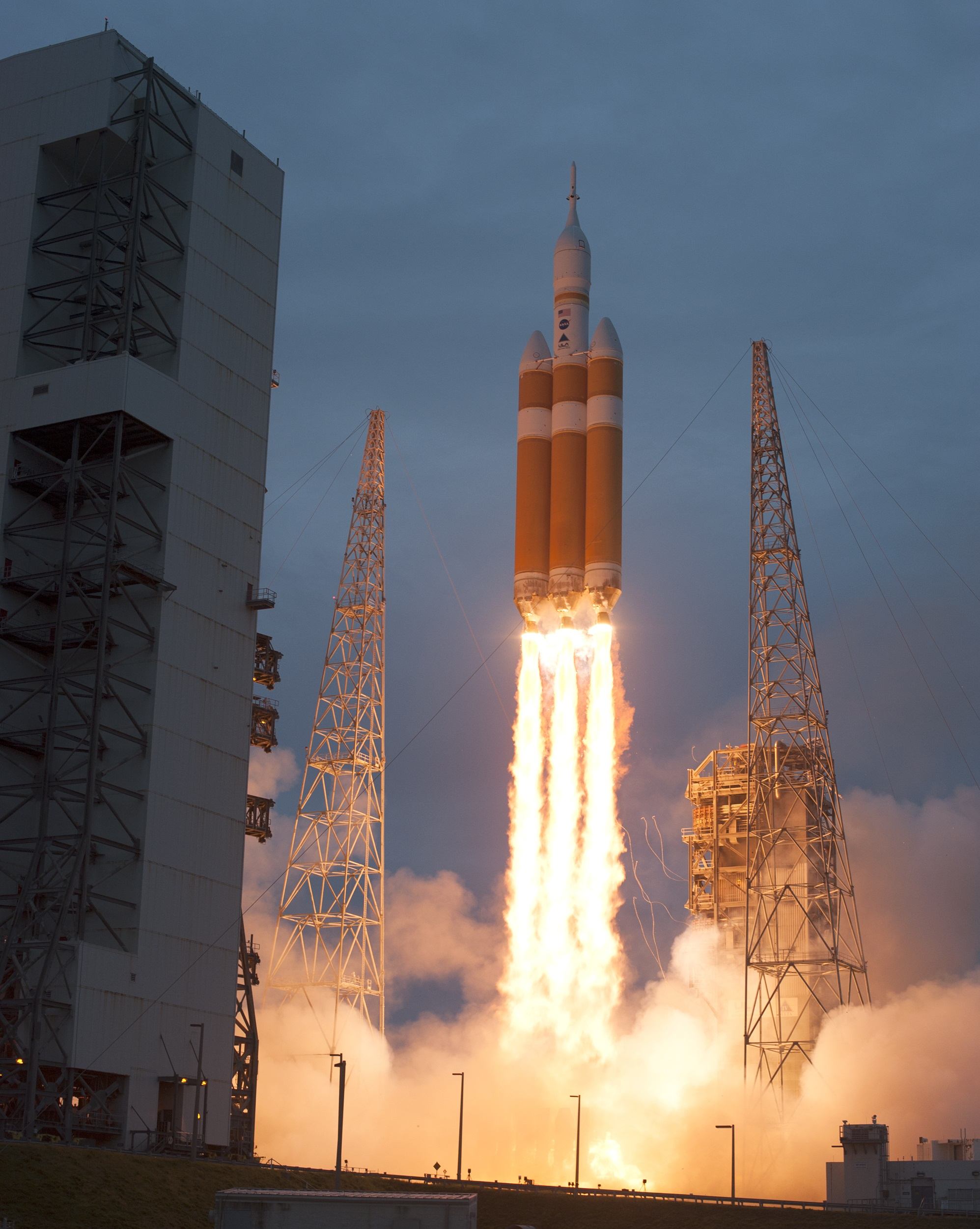
- Orion EFT-1, the first test flight of the Orion spacecraft, occurred on 5 December 2014.

Orbital launches
- First: 5 January
- Last: 31 December
- Total: 92
- Successes: 88
- Failures: 2
- Partial failures: 2
- Catalogued: 90

National firsts
- Satellite: Lithuania; Bermuda; Belgium; Iraq; Uruguay

Rockets
- Maiden flights: Angara A5; Antares 120; Antares 130; Long March 3C/E
- Retirements: Antares 120; Antares 130

Crewed flights
- Orbital: 4
- Total travellers: 12
- EVAs: 7

2014 in spaceflight

In 2014, the maiden flight of the Angara A5, Antares 120 and Antares 130 took place.

A total of 92 orbital launches were attempted in 2014, of which 88 were successful, two were partially successful and two were failures. The year also saw seven EVAs by ISS astronauts. The majority of the year's orbital launches were conducted by Russia, the United States and China, with 34, 23 and 16 launches respectively.

== Overview ==
An Ariane 5 ES launched the Georges Lemaître Automated Transfer Vehicle, the last one of the series, which also marked 60 successfully completed Ariane 5 launches in a row.

On 22 August 2014, Arianespace launched the first two Full Operational Capability Galileo satellites for the European satellite navigation system.

A number of significant events in planetary exploration occurred in 2014, including the entry of the Rosetta spacecraft into orbit around the comet 67P/Churyumov–Gerasimenko in August 2014 and the deployment of the Philae lander to its surface in November, which marked the first orbit of and landing on a comet, respectively, and featured prominently in social media. Another notable occurrence was the entry of India's Mars Orbiter Mission into Martian orbit in September, making India the first Asian nation to reach Mars.

On 5 December 2014, a United Launch Alliance Delta IV Heavy launched the first Orion spacecraft test mission for NASA, Exploration Flight Test 1.

== Orbital launches ==
- ← Jan
- Feb
- Mar
- Apr
- May
- Jun
- Jul
- Aug
- Sep
- Oct
- Nov
- Dec →

Date and time (UTC)	Rocket	Flight number	Launch site		LSP	
Date and time (UTC)	Payload (⚀ = CubeSat)	Operator	Orbit	Function	Decay (UTC)	Outcome
Date and time (UTC)	Remarks					
=== January ===
5 January; 10:48:00	(India) GSLV Mk II		(India) Satish Dhawan SLP		(India) ISRO	
5 January; 10:48:00	(India) GSAT-14	ISRO	Geosynchronous	Communications	In orbit	Operational
6 January; 22:06:00	(United States) Falcon 9 v1.1		(United States) Cape Canaveral SLC-40		(United States) SpaceX	
6 January; 22:06:00	(Thailand) Thaicom 6	Thaicom (Shin Corporation)	Geosynchronous	Communications	In orbit	Operational
9 January; 18:07:05	(United States) Antares 120		(United States) MARS LP-0A		(United States) Orbital Sciences	
9 January; 18:07:05	(United States) Cygnus CRS Orb-1; S.S. C. Gordon Fullerton	NASA	Low Earth (ISS)	ISS logistics	19 February 2014; 18:20	Successful
9 January; 18:07:05	⚀ (United States) ArduSat-2	NanoSatisfi	Low Earth	Technology demonstration	1 July 2014	
9 January; 18:07:05	⚀ (Lithuania) Lituanica SAT-1	VU	Low Earth	Technology demonstration	28 July 2014	
9 January; 18:07:05	⚀ (Lithuania) LitSat-1	LSA, KTU, VGTU	Low Earth	Technology demonstration	22 May 2014	
9 January; 18:07:05	⚀ (United States) SkyCube	SkyCube	Low Earth	Technology demonstration	8 November 2014	
9 January; 18:07:05	⚀ (Peru) UAPSat-1	UAP	Low Earth	Technology demonstration	22 May 2014	
9 January; 18:07:05	⚀ (United States) Flock-1 × 28	Planet Labs	Low Earth	Earth observation	First: 3 May 2014; Last: 29 October 2014	
9 January; 18:07:05	First Orbital Sciences CRS operational flight, maiden flight of Antares 120. All payloads other than Cygnus are CubeSats carried aboard the Cygnus for deployment from the ISS. CubeSats include first Lithuanian satellites. Largest number of satellites launched on a single rocket (33).					
24 January; 02:33:00	(United States) Atlas V 401		(United States) Cape Canaveral SLC-41		(United States) United Launch Alliance	
24 January; 02:33:00	(United States) TDRS-L (TDRS-12)	NASA	Geosynchronous	Communications / Data Relay	In orbit	Operational
← Jan; Feb; Mar; Apr; May; Jun; Jul; Aug; Sep; Oct; Nov; Dec →; === February ===
5 February; 16:23:32	(Russia) Soyuz-U		(Kazakhstan) Baikonur Site 1/5		(Russia) Roskosmos	
5 February; 16:23:32	(Russia) Progress M-22M / 54P	Roskosmos	Low Earth (ISS)	ISS logistics	18 April 2014; 15:46	Successful
5 February; 16:23:32	⚀ (Peru) Chasqui-1	Universidad Nacional de Ingeniería del Perú	Low Earth	Technology demonstration	15 January 2015	Spacecraft failure
5 February; 16:23:32	Chasqui-1 released from the ISS by cosmonauts during EVA on 18 August.					
6 February; 21:30:07	(France) Ariane 5 ECA		(France) Kourou ELA-3		(France) Arianespace	
6 February; 21:30:07	(Bermuda) ABS-2	ABS	Geosynchronous	Communications	In orbit	Operational
6 February; 21:30:07	(France) (Italy) Athena-Fidus	CNES / ASI	Geosynchronous	Communications	In orbit	Operational
14 February; 21:09:03	(Russia) Proton-M / Briz-M		(Kazakhstan) Baikonur Site 81/24		(Russia) (United States) International Launch Services	
14 February; 21:09:03	(Turkey) Türksat 4A	Türksat	Geosynchronous	Communications	In orbit	Operational
21 February; 01:59:00	(United States) Delta IV M+(4,2)		(United States) Cape Canaveral SLC-37B		(United States) United Launch Alliance	
21 February; 01:59:00	(United States) USA-248 (GPS IIF-5)	US Air Force	Medium Earth	Navigation	In orbit	Operational
21 February; 01:59:00	Named after Star Canopus.					
27 February; 18:37:00	(Japan) H-IIA 202		(Japan) Tanegashima Y1		(Japan) Mitsubishi Heavy Industries	
27 February; 18:37:00	(Japan) (United States) GPM-Core	JAXA / NASA	Low Earth	Environmental	In orbit	Operational
27 February; 18:37:00	(Japan) Ginrei (ShindaiSat)	Shinshu University	Low Earth	Technology demonstration	24 November 2014	Successful
27 February; 18:37:00	(Japan) STARS-II	Kagawa University	Low Earth	Technology demonstration	26 April 2014	
27 February; 18:37:00	(Japan) TeikyoSat-3	Teikyo University		Technology demonstration / Microbiology	25 October 2014	Successful
27 February; 18:37:00	⚀ (Japan) KSAT-2	Kagoshima University	Low Earth	Technology demonstration	18 May 2014	Successful
27 February; 18:37:00	⚀ (Japan) OPUSAT	OPU	Low Earth	Technology demonstration	24 July 2014	
27 February; 18:37:00	⚀ (Japan) INVADER	Tamabi	Low Earth	Amateur radio	2 September 2014	Successful
27 February; 18:37:00	⚀ (Japan) ITF-1	Tsukuba University	Low Earth	Amateur radio	29 June 2014	Spacecraft failure
27 February; 18:37:00	ITF-1 failed to communicate.					
← Jan; Feb; Mar; Apr; May; Jun; Jul; Aug; Sep; Oct; Nov; Dec →; === March ===
15 March; 23:08:00	(Russia) Proton-M / Briz-M		(Kazakhstan) Baikonur Site 81/24		(Russia) Khrunichev	
15 March; 23:08:00	(Russia) Ekspress-AT1	RSCC	Geosynchronous	Communications	In orbit	Operational
15 March; 23:08:00	(Russia) Ekspress-AT2	RSCC	Geosynchronous	Communications	In orbit	Operational
22 March; 22:04:07	(France) Ariane 5 ECA		(France) Kourou ELA-3		(France) Arianespace	
22 March; 22:04:07	(Luxembourg) Astra 5B	SES S.A.	Geosynchronous	Communications	In orbit	Operational
22 March; 22:04:07	(Spain) Amazonas 4A	Hispasat	Geosynchronous	Communications	In orbit	Operational
23 March; 22:54:03	(Russia) Soyuz-2.1b / Fregat		(Russia) Plesetsk Site 43/4		(Russia) RVSN RF	
23 March; 22:54:03	(Russia) Kosmos 2494 (GLONASS-M 754)	VKO	Medium Earth	Navigation	In orbit	Operational
25 March; 21:17:23	(Russia) Soyuz-FG		(Kazakhstan) Baikonur Site 1/5		(Russia) Roskosmos	
25 March; 21:17:23	(Russia) Soyuz TMA-12M	Roskosmos	Low Earth (ISS)	Expedition 39 / 40	11 September 2014; 02:23	Successful
25 March; 21:17:23	Crewed flight with three cosmonauts					
31 March; 02:46:03	(China) Long March 2C		(China) Jiuquan SLS-2		(China) CALT	
31 March; 02:46:03	(China) Shiajian 11-06	CASC	Low Earth (SSO)	Technology demonstration	In orbit	Operational
← Jan; Feb; Mar; Apr; May; Jun; Jul; Aug; Sep; Oct; Nov; Dec →; === April ===
3 April; 14:46:30	(United States) Atlas V 401		(United States) Vandenberg SLC-3E		(United States) United Launch Alliance	
3 April; 14:46:30	(United States) USA-249 (DMSP-5D3 F19)	US Air Force / NOAA	Low Earth (SSO)	Meteorology	In orbit	Spacecraft failure
3 April; 14:46:30	The spacecraft stopped responding to commands on 11 February 2016 due to a power failure affecting an encrypted command-and-control system.					
3 April; 21:02:26	(Russia) Soyuz-STA / Fregat		(France) Kourou ELS		(France) Arianespace	
3 April; 21:02:26	Sentinel-1A	ESA	Low Earth (SSO)	Earth observation	In orbit	Operational
4 April; 11:44:00	(India) PSLV-XL		(India) Satish Dhawan FLP		(India) ISRO	
4 April; 11:44:00	(India) IRNSS-1B	ISRO	Geosynchronous	Navigation	In orbit	Operational
9 April; 15:26:27	(Russia) Soyuz-U		(Kazakhstan) Baikonur Site 1/5		(Russia) Roskosmos	
9 April; 15:26:27	(Russia) Progress M-23M / 55P	Roskosmos	Low Earth (ISS)	ISS logistics	31 July 2014	Successful
9 April; 19:06:02	(Israel) Shavit		(Israel) Palmachim Airbase		Israel Aerospace Industries	
9 April; 19:06:02	(Israel) Ofeq 10	Israel Defense Forces	Low Earth	Reconnaissance	In orbit	Operational
10 April; 17:45:00	(United States) Atlas V 541		(United States) Cape Canaveral SLC-41		(United States) United Launch Alliance	
10 April; 17:45:00	(United States) USA-250 (NRO L-67)	NRO	Geosynchronous	ELINT (?)	In orbit	Operational
10 April; 17:45:00	NROL-67 mission.					
16 April; 16:20:00	(Russia) Soyuz-U		(Kazakhstan) Baikonur Site 31/6		(Russia) Roskosmos	
16 April; 16:20:00	(Egypt) EgyptSat 2	NARSSS	Low Earth	Remote sensing	14 April 2015	Spacecraft failure
18 April; 19:25:22	(United States) Falcon 9 v1.1		(United States) Cape Canaveral SLC-40		(United States) SpaceX	
18 April; 19:25:22	(United States) SpaceX CRS-3	NASA	Low Earth (ISS)	ISS logistics	18 May 2014; 19:05	Successful
18 April; 19:25:22	⚀ (United States) ALL-STAR/THEIA	Colorado / ALL-STAR	Low Earth	Technology demonstration	26 May 2014	Spacecraft failure
18 April; 19:25:22	⚀ (United States) KickSat	KickSat / Cornell	Low Earth	Technology demonstration	14 May 2014; 01:30	Spacecraft failure
18 April; 19:25:22	⚀ (United States) PhoneSat 2.5	NASA Ames	Low Earth	Technology demonstration	15 May 2014	
18 April; 19:25:22	⚀ (United States) SporeSat 1	NASA Ames / Purdue	Low Earth	Life sciences	4 June 2014	
18 April; 19:25:22	⚀ (United States) TestSat-Lite	Taylor University	Low Earth	Technology demonstration	28 May 2014	
18 April; 19:25:22	The ELaNa 5 mission, consisting of 5 cubesats, was launched on this flight. KickSat carried and failed to deploy 104 femtosatellites in low Earth orbit.					
28 April; 04:25:00	(Russia) Proton-M / Briz-M		(Kazakhstan) Baikonur Site 81/24		(Russia) Roscosmos	
28 April; 04:25:00	(Russia) Luch 5V	Gonets Satellite System	Geosynchronous	Communications / Data Relay	In orbit	Operational
28 April; 04:25:00	(Kazakhstan) KazSat-3	JSC KazSat	Geosynchronous	Communications	In orbit	Spacecraft failure
30 April; 01:35:15	(Italy) Vega		(France) Kourou ELV		(France) Arianespace	
30 April; 01:35:15	(Kazakhstan) KazEOSat 1	KGS	Low Earth (SSO)	Optical imaging	In orbit	Operational
← Jan; Feb; Mar; Apr; May; Jun; Jul; Aug; Sep; Oct; Nov; Dec →; === May ===
6 May; 13:49:35	(Russia) Soyuz-2.1a		(Russia) Plesetsk Site 43/4		(Russia) RVSN RF	
6 May; 13:49:35	(Russia) Kosmos 2495 (Kobalt-M)	VKO	Low Earth	Reconnaissance	3 September 2014	Successful
15 May; 21:42:00	(Russia) Proton-M / Briz-M		(Kazakhstan) Baikonur Site 200/39		(Russia) Khrunichev	
15 May; 21:42:00	(Russia) Ekspress-AM4R	RSCC	Intended: Geosynchronous	Communications	15 May 2014	Launch failure
15 May; 21:42:00	A third stage vernier thruster failed at T+542 seconds after the failure of the turbopump structural support caused damage to the oxidiser inlet line.					
17 May; 00:03:00	(United States) Delta IV M+(4,2)		(United States) Cape Canaveral SLC-37B		(United States) United Launch Alliance	
17 May; 00:03:00	(United States) USA-251 (GPS IIF-6)	U.S. Air Force	Medium Earth	Navigation	In orbit	Operational
17 May; 00:03:00	Named after Star Rigel.					
22 May; 13:09:00	(United States) Atlas V 401		(United States) Cape Canaveral SLC-41		(United States) United Launch Alliance	
22 May; 13:09:00	(United States) USA-252 (Quasar)	NRO	Geosynchronous	Communications	In orbit	Operational
22 May; 13:09:00	NRO Launch 33					
23 May; 05:27:54	(Russia) Rokot / Briz-KM		(Russia) Plesetsk Site 133/3		(Russia) VKO	
23 May; 05:27:54	(Russia) Kosmos 2496 (Strela-3M)	VKO	Low Earth	Communications	In orbit	Operational
23 May; 05:27:54	(Russia) Kosmos 2497 (Strela-3M)	VKO	Low Earth	Communications	In orbit	Operational
23 May; 05:27:54	(Russia) Kosmos 2498 (Strela-3M)	VKO	Low Earth	Communications	In orbit	Operational
23 May; 05:27:54	(Russia) Kosmos 2499	VKO	Low Earth	Technology demonstration / Satellite inspection (?)	In orbit	Destroyed
23 May; 05:27:54	Kosmos 2499 broke up in orbit on 4 January 2023.					
24 May; 03:05:14	(Japan) H-IIA 202		(Japan) Tanegashima Y1		(Japan) Mitsubishi Heavy Industries	
24 May; 03:05:14	(Japan) ALOS-2	JAXA	Low Earth (SSO)	Earth observation	In orbit	Operational
24 May; 03:05:14	(Japan) RISING-2	Tohoku	Low Earth (SSO)	Remote sensing	In orbit	Operational
24 May; 03:05:14	(Japan) UNIFORM-1	Wakayama University	Low Earth (SSO)	Remote sensing	In orbit	Operational
24 May; 03:05:14	(Japan) SOCRATES	AES	Low Earth (SSO)	Technology demonstration	In orbit	Successful
24 May; 03:05:14	(Japan) SPROUT	Nihon	Low Earth (SSO)	Technology demonstration / Amateur radio	In orbit	Operational
26 May; 21:09:59	(Ukraine) Zenit-3SL		(Norway) Odyssey		(United Nations) Sea Launch	
26 May; 21:09:59	(France) Eutelsat 3B	Eutelsat	Geosynchronous	Communications	In orbit	Operational
28 May; 19:57:41	(Russia) Soyuz-FG		(Kazakhstan) Baikonur Site 1/5		(Russia) Roskosmos	
28 May; 19:57:41	(Russia) Soyuz TMA-13M	Roskosmos	Low Earth (ISS)	Expedition 40 / 41	10 November 2014; 03:58	Successful
28 May; 19:57:41	Crewed flight with three cosmonauts					
← Jan; Feb; Mar; Apr; May; Jun; Jul; Aug; Sep; Oct; Nov; Dec →; === June ===
14 June; 17:16:48	(Russia) Soyuz-2.1b / Fregat		(Russia) Plesetsk Site 43/4		(Russia) RVSN RF	
14 June; 17:16:48	(Russia) Kosmos 2500 (GLONASS-M 755)	VKO	Medium Earth	Navigation	In orbit	Operational
19 June; 19:11:17	(Ukraine) Dnepr		(Russia) Dombarovsky Site 13		(Russia) (Ukraine) ISC Kosmotras	
19 June; 19:11:17	(United States) AprizeSat 9	SpaceQuest, Ltd.	Low Earth (SSO)	Communications	In orbit	Operational
19 June; 19:11:17	(United States) AprizeSat 10	SpaceQuest, Ltd.	Low Earth (SSO)	Communications	In orbit	Operational
19 June; 19:11:17	(Canada) BRITE-CA 1	UTIAS	Low Earth (SSO)	Photometry / Technology demonstration	In orbit	Operational
19 June; 19:11:17	(Canada) BRITE-CA 2	UTIAS	Low Earth (SSO)	Photometry / Technology demonstration	In orbit	Operational
19 June; 19:11:17	(Argentina) BugSat 1	Satellogic S.A.	Low Earth (SSO)	Technology demonstration / Earth observation	In orbit	Operational
19 June; 19:11:17	(Spain) Deimos-2	Deimos Space	Low Earth (SSO)	Earth observation	In orbit	Operational
19 June; 19:11:17	(Japan) Hodoyoshi 3	University of Tokyo	Low Earth (SSO)	Technology demonstration	In orbit	Operational
19 June; 19:11:17	(Japan) Hodoyoshi 4	University of Tokyo	Low Earth (SSO)	Technology demonstration	In orbit	Operational
19 June; 19:11:17	(Kazakhstan) KazEOSat 2	KGS	Low Earth (SSO)	Optical imaging	In orbit	Operational
19 June; 19:11:17	⚀ (United States) (Russia) Perseus-M 1	Canopus Systems US / Dauria Aerospace	Low Earth (SSO)	Technology demonstration	In orbit	Operational
19 June; 19:11:17	⚀ (United States) (Russia) Perseus-M 2	Canopus Systems US / Dauria Aerospace	Low Earth (SSO)	Technology demonstration	In orbit	Operational
19 June; 19:11:17	⚀ (Belgium) QB50P1	Von Karman Institute	Low Earth (SSO)	Thermosphere research	In orbit	Operational
19 June; 19:11:17	⚀ (Belgium) QB50P2	Von Karman Institute	Low Earth (SSO)	Thermosphere research	In orbit	Operational
19 June; 19:11:17	(Saudi Arabia) SaudiSat-4	KACST	Low Earth (SSO)	Technology demonstration	In orbit	Operational
19 June; 19:11:17	(Russia) TabletSat-Aurora	SPUTNIX	Low Earth (SSO)	Technology demonstration / Earth observation	In orbit	Operational
19 June; 19:11:17	(Italy) UniSat 6	La Sapienza	Low Earth (SSO)	Optical imaging, cubesat deployment	In orbit	Operational
19 June; 19:11:17	⚀ (United States) AeroCube 6	The Aerospace Corporation	Low Earth (SSO)	Technology demonstration	In orbit	Operational
19 June; 19:11:17	⚀ (Uruguay) ANTELSAT	UdelaR	Low Earth (SSO)	Technology demonstration	In orbit	Operational
19 June; 19:11:17	⚀ (Denmark) DTUSat 2	DTU	Low Earth (SSO)	Technology demonstration	In orbit	Operational
19 June; 19:11:17	⚀ (Israel) Duchifat-1	HSC	Low Earth (SSO)	Technology demonstration	In orbit	Operational
19 June; 19:11:17	⚀ (United States) Flock-1c × 11	Planet Labs	Low Earth (SSO)	Earth observation	In orbit	Operational
19 June; 19:11:17	⚀ (United States) Lemur-1	NanoSatisfi	Low Earth (SSO)	Earth observation	In orbit	Operational
19 June; 19:11:17	⚀ (Brazil) NanoSatC-Br 1	INPE	Low Earth (SSO)	Magnetosphere research	In orbit	Operational
19 June; 19:11:17	⚀ (Taiwan) PACE	NCKU	Low Earth (SSO)	Technology demonstration	In orbit	Operational
19 June; 19:11:17	⚀ (Ukraine) PolyITAN-1	KPI	Low Earth (SSO)	Technology demonstration	In orbit	Operational
19 June; 19:11:17	⚀ (Singapore) POPSAT-HIP 1	Microspace Rapid, Singapore	Low Earth (SSO)	Technology demonstration	In orbit	Operational
19 June; 19:11:17	⚀ (Iraq) (Italy) Tigrisat	MOST / La Sapienza	Low Earth (SSO)	Earth observation	In orbit	Operational
19 June; 19:11:17	Largest number of satellites launched on a single rocket (37). Include first Belgian (pair), Uruguay's and Iraqi satellites.					
30 June; 04:22:00	(India) PSLV-CA		(India) Satish Dhawan FLP		(India) ISRO	
30 June; 04:22:00	(France) SPOT 7	Spot Image	Low Earth (SSO)	Earth observation	In orbit	Operational
30 June; 04:22:00	(Canada) CanX-4	UTIAS	Low Earth (SSO)	Technology demonstration	In orbit	Operational
30 June; 04:22:00	(Canada) CanX-5	UTIAS	Low Earth (SSO)	Technology demonstration	In orbit	Operational
30 June; 04:22:00	(Germany) AISat	DLR	Low Earth (SSO)	Technology demonstration	In orbit	Operational
30 June; 04:22:00	⚀ (Singapore) VELOX-I	NTU	Low Earth (SSO)	Technology demonstration	In orbit	Operational
← Jan; Feb; Mar; Apr; May; Jun; Jul; Aug; Sep; Oct; Nov; Dec →; === July ===
2 July; 09:56:23	(United States) Delta II 7320-10C		(United States) Vandenberg SLC-2W		(United States) United Launch Alliance	
2 July; 09:56:23	(United States) OCO-2	NASA	Low Earth (SSO)	Climatology	In orbit	Operational
3 July; 12:43:52	(Russia) Rokot / Briz-KM		(Russia) Plesetsk Site 133/3		(Russia) VKO	
3 July; 12:43:52	(Russia) Gonets-M 8	Gonets Satellite System	Low Earth	Communications	In orbit	Operational
3 July; 12:43:52	(Russia) Gonets-M 9	Gonets Satellite System	Low Earth	Communications	In orbit	Operational
3 July; 12:43:52	(Russia) Gonets-M 10	Gonets Satellite System	Low Earth	Communications	In orbit	Operational
8 July; 15:58:28	(Russia) Soyuz-2.1b / Fregat		(Kazakhstan) Baikonur Site 31/6		(Russia) Roskosmos	
8 July; 15:58:28	(Russia) Meteor-M No.2	Roskosmos	Low Earth (SSO)	Meteorology	In orbit	Operational
8 July; 15:58:28	(Norway) AISSat-2	NDRE	Low Earth (SSO)	Technology demonstration	In orbit	Operational
8 July; 15:58:28	(Russia) DX-1	Dauria Aerospace	Low Earth (SSO)	Technology demonstration	In orbit	Operational
8 July; 15:58:28	(Russia) MKA-PN2 (Relek)	Roskosmos	Low Earth (SSO)	Magnetosphere research	In orbit	Spacecraft failure
8 July; 15:58:28	(United States) SkySat-2	Skybox Imaging	Low Earth (SSO)	Earth observation	In orbit	Operational
8 July; 15:58:28	(United Kingdom) TechDemoSat-1	UKSA	Low Earth (SSO)	Technology demonstration	In orbit	Operational
8 July; 15:58:28	⚀ (United Kingdom) UKube-1	UKSA	Low Earth (SSO)	Technology demonstration	In orbit	Operational
10 July; 18:55:56	(Russia) Soyuz-STB / Fregat		(France) Kourou ELS		(France) Arianespace	
10 July; 18:55:56	(Jersey) O3b FM3	O3b Networks	Medium Earth	Communications	In orbit	Operational
10 July; 18:55:56	(Jersey) O3b FM6	O3b Networks	Medium Earth	Communications	In orbit	Operational
10 July; 18:55:56	(Jersey) O3b FM7	O3b Networks	Medium Earth	Communications	In orbit	Operational
10 July; 18:55:56	(Jersey) O3b FM8	O3b Networks	Medium Earth	Communications	In orbit	Operational
13 July; 16:52:14	(United States) Antares 120		(United States) MARS LP-0A		(United States) Orbital Sciences	
13 July; 16:52:14	(United States) Cygnus CRS Orb-2; S.S. Janice Voss	NASA	Low Earth (ISS)	ISS logistics	17 August 2014	Successful
13 July; 16:52:14	⚀ (United States) Flock-1b × 28	Planet Labs	Low Earth	Optical imaging	First: 13 December 2014; Last: 16 October 2015	Successful
13 July; 16:52:14	⚀ (United States) GEARRS	Taylor University / USAF	Low Earth	Technology demonstration	8 November 2015	Successful
13 July; 16:52:14	⚀ (Greece) Lambdasat	Lambda Team	Low Earth	Technology demonstration	16 May 2015	Successful
13 July; 16:52:14	⚀ (United States) MicroMAS	MIT	Low Earth	Technology demonstration	1 August 2015	Successful
13 July; 16:52:14	⚀ (United States) TechEdSat-4	NASA Ames	Low Earth	Optical imaging	3 April 2015	Successful
13 July; 16:52:14	All payloads other than Cygnus are CubeSats carried aboard the Cygnus for deployment from the ISS. Flock-1b 3/4/13/14/19/20 were not deployed.					
14 July; 15:15:00	(United States) Falcon 9 v1.1		(United States) Cape Canaveral SLC-40		(United States) SpaceX	
14 July; 15:15:00	(United States) Orbcomm-2 F3	Orbcomm	Low Earth	Communications	In orbit	Operational
14 July; 15:15:00	(United States) Orbcomm-2 F4	Orbcomm	Low Earth	Communications	In orbit	Operational
14 July; 15:15:00	(United States) Orbcomm-2 F6	Orbcomm	Low Earth	Communications	In orbit	Operational
14 July; 15:15:00	(United States) Orbcomm-2 F7	Orbcomm	Low Earth	Communications	In orbit	Operational
14 July; 15:15:00	(United States) Orbcomm-2 F9	Orbcomm	Low Earth	Communications	In orbit	Operational
14 July; 15:15:00	(United States) Orbcomm-2 F11	Orbcomm	Low Earth	Communications	In orbit	Operational
18 July; 20:50:00	(Russia) Soyuz-2.1a		(Kazakhstan) Baikonur Site 31/6		(Russia) Roskosmos	
18 July; 20:50:00	(Russia) Foton-M No.4	Roscosmos	Low Earth	Microgravity science	1 September 2014; 09:18	Successful
23 July; 21:44:44	(Russia) Soyuz-U		(Kazakhstan) Baikonur Site 1/5		(Russia) Roskosmos	
23 July; 21:44:44	(Russia) Progress M-24M / 56P	Roskosmos	Low Earth (ISS)	ISS logistics	20 November 2014	Successful
28 July; 23:28:00	(United States) Delta IV M+(4,2)		(United States) Cape Canaveral SLC-37B		(United States) United Launch Alliance	
28 July; 23:28:00	(United States) USA-253 (GSSAP #1 )	U.S. Air Force	Geosynchronous	Space surveillance	In orbit	Operational
28 July; 23:28:00	(United States) USA-254 (GSSAP #2 )	U.S. Air Force	Geosynchronous	Space surveillance	In orbit	Successful
28 July; 23:28:00	(United States) ANGELS (USA-255)	AFRL	Geosynchronous	Technology demonstration	In orbit	Successful
28 July; 23:28:00	Air Force Space Command Launch 4. First launch for the USAF Geosynchronous Space Situational Awareness Program.					
29 July; 23:47:38	(France) Ariane 5 ES		(France) Kourou ELA-3		(France) Arianespace	
29 July; 23:47:38	Georges Lemaître ATV	ESA	Low Earth (ISS)	ISS logistics	15 February 2015	Successful
← Jan; Feb; Mar; Apr; May; Jun; Jul; Aug; Sep; Oct; Nov; Dec →; === August ===
2 August; 03:23:00	(United States) Atlas V 401		(United States) Cape Canaveral SLC-41		(United States) United Launch Alliance	
2 August; 03:23:00	(United States) USA-256 (GPS IIF-7)	U.S. Air Force	Medium Earth	Navigation	In orbit	Operational
2 August; 03:23:00	Named after Star Capella.					
5 August; 08:00:00	(United States) Falcon 9 v1.1		(United States) Cape Canaveral SLC-40		(United States) SpaceX	
5 August; 08:00:00	(Hong Kong) AsiaSat 8	AsiaSat	Geosynchronous	Communications	In orbit	Operational
9 August; 05:45:03	(China) Long March 4C		(China) Jiuquan SLS-2		(China) SAST	
9 August; 05:45:03	(China) Yaogan 20A	CAST	Low Earth	ELINT	In orbit	Operational
9 August; 05:45:03	(China) Yaogan 20B	CAST	Low Earth	ELINT	In orbit	Operational
9 August; 05:45:03	(China) Yaogan 20C	CAST	Low Earth	ELINT	In orbit	Operational
13 August; 18:30:30	(United States) Atlas V 401		(United States) Vandenberg SLC-3E		(United States) United Launch Alliance	
13 August; 18:30:30	(United States) WorldView-3	DigitalGlobe	Low Earth (SSO)	Earth observation	In orbit	Operational
19 August; 03:15:05	(China) Long March 4B		(China) Taiyuan LC-9		(China) SAST	
19 August; 03:15:05	(China) Gaofen 2	CNSA	Low Earth (SSO)	Earth observation	In orbit	Operational
19 August; 03:15:05	(Poland) Heweliusz (BRITE-PL2)	PAS	Low Earth (SSO)	Photometry	In orbit	Operational
22 August; 12:27:11	(Russia) Soyuz-STB / Fregat		(France) Kourou ELS		(France) Arianespace	
22 August; 12:27:11	Galileo FOC 1	ESA	Medium Earth	Navigation	In orbit	Partial launch failure Operational
22 August; 12:27:11	Galileo FOC 2	ESA	Medium Earth	Navigation	In orbit	Partial launch failure Operational
22 August; 12:27:11	Spacecraft in incorrect orbit due to an interruption of the Fregat's upper stage attitude control thrusters when its hydrazine propellant supply became frozen by a cold helium feed line incorrectly routed close to it. Both satellites were later moved to a usable orbit on their own power.					
← Jan; Feb; Mar; Apr; May; Jun; Jul; Aug; Sep; Oct; Nov; Dec →; === September ===
4 September; 00:15:04	(China) Long March 2D		(China) Jiuquan SLS-2		(China) SAST	
4 September; 00:15:04	(China) Chuangxin 1-04	CAS	Low Earth (SSO)	Communications	In orbit	Operational
4 September; 00:15:04	(China) Lingqiao	Tsinghua	Low Earth (SSO)	Communications / Technology demonstration	In orbit	Operational
7 September; 05:00:00	(United States) Falcon 9 v1.1		(United States) Cape Canaveral SLC-40		(United States) SpaceX	
7 September; 05:00:00	(Hong Kong) AsiaSat 6	AsiaSat	Geosynchronous	Communications	In orbit	Operational
8 September; 03:22:05	(China) Long March 4B		(China) Taiyuan LC-9		(China) SAST	
8 September; 03:22:05	(China) Yaogan 21	CAST	Low Earth (SSO)	Reconnaissance	In orbit	Operational
8 September; 03:22:05	(China) Tiantuo 2	NUDT	Low Earth (SSO)	Technology demonstration	In orbit	Operational
11 September; 22:05:07	(France) Ariane 5 ECA		(France) Kourou ELA-3		(France) Arianespace	
11 September; 22:05:07	(Malaysia) MEASAT 3b	MEASAT	Geosynchronous	Communications	In orbit	Operational
11 September; 22:05:07	(Australia) Optus 10	Optus	Geosynchronous	Communications	In orbit	Operational
17 September; 00:10:00	(United States) Atlas V 401		(United States) Cape Canaveral SLC-41		(United States) United Launch Alliance	
17 September; 00:10:00	(United States) USA-257 (CLIO / Nemesis 2)	NRO	Geosynchronous	COMINT	In orbit	Operational
21 September; 05:52:03	(United States) Falcon 9 v1.1		(United States) Cape Canaveral SLC-40		(United States) SpaceX	
21 September; 05:52:03	(United States) SpaceX CRS-4	NASA	Low Earth (ISS)	ISS logistics	25 October 2014	Successful
21 September; 05:52:03	(United States) SpinSat	NRL	Low Earth	Technology demonstration	In orbit	Operational
21 September; 05:52:03	SpinSat was deployed from the ISS on 28 November.					
25 September; 20:25:00	(Russia) Soyuz-FG		(Kazakhstan) Baikonur Site 1/5		(Russia) Roskosmos	
25 September; 20:25:00	(Russia) Soyuz TMA-14M	Roskosmos	Low Earth (ISS)	Expedition 41 / 42	12 March 2015; 02:07	Successful
25 September; 20:25:00	Crewed flight with three cosmonauts.					
27 September; 20:23:00	(Russia) Proton-M / Briz-M		(Kazakhstan) Baikonur Site 81/24		(Russia) Khrunichev	
27 September; 20:23:00	(Russia) Olymp-K (Luch)	VKO	Geosynchronous	SIGINT	In orbit	Successful
27 September; 20:23:00	Decommissioned in October 2025. Partially disintegrated in graveyard orbit on 30 January 2026.					
28 September; 05:13:03	(China) Long March 2C		(China) Jiuquan SLS-2		(China) CALT	
28 September; 05:13:03	(China) Shijian 11-07	CNSA	Low Earth (SSO)	Technology demonstration	In orbit	Operational
← Jan; Feb; Mar; Apr; May; Jun; Jul; Aug; Sep; Oct; Nov; Dec →; === October ===
7 October; 05:16:00	(Japan) H-IIA 202		(Japan) Tanegashima Y1		(Japan) Mitsubishi Heavy Industries	
7 October; 05:16:00	(Japan) Himawari 8	JMA	Geosynchronous	Meteorology	In orbit	Operational
15 October; 20:02:00	(India) PSLV-XL		(India) Satish Dhawan FLP		(India) ISRO	
15 October; 20:02:00	(India) IRNSS-1C	ISRO	Geosynchronous	Navigation	In orbit	Operational
16 October; 21:43:52	(France) Ariane 5 ECA		(France) Kourou ELA-3		(France) Arianespace	
16 October; 21:43:52	(United States) Intelsat 30	Intelsat	Geosynchronous	Communications	In orbit	Operational
16 October; 21:43:52	(Argentina) ARSAT-1	AR-SAT SA	Geosynchronous	Communications	In orbit	Operational
20 October; 06:31:04	(China) Long March 4C		(China) Taiyuan LC-9		(China) SAST	
20 October; 06:31:04	(China) Yaogan 22	CAST	Low Earth (SSO)	Reconnaissance	In orbit	Operational
21 October; 15:09:32	(Russia) Proton-M / Briz-M		(Kazakhstan) Baikonur Site 81/24		(Russia) Khrunichev	
21 October; 15:09:32	(Russia) Ekspress AM6	RSCC	Geosynchronous	Communications	In orbit	Partial launch failure Operational
21 October; 15:09:32	Upper stage underperformance resulted in lower than planned deployment orbit.					
23 October; 18:00:04	(China) Long March 3C/E		(China) Xichang LC-2		(China) CALT	
23 October; 18:00:04	(China) Chang'e 5-T1	CNSA	Lunar free-return trajectory	Technology demonstration	In orbit	Operational
23 October; 18:00:04	(China) Chang'e 5-T1 return capsule	CNSA	Lunar free-return trajectory	Technology demonstration	31 October; 22:42	Successful
23 October; 18:00:04	Testing of Chang'e 5 lunar sample return module in lunar free-return trajectory; main spacecraft later flew to Earth-Moon L2 Lagrange point.					
27 October; 06:59:03	(China) Long March 2C		(China) Jiuquan SLS-2		(China) CALT	
27 October; 06:59:03	(China) Shijian 11-08	CNSA	Low Earth (SSO)	Technology demonstration	In orbit	Operational
28 October; 22:22:38	(United States) Antares 130		(United States) MARS LP-0A		(United States) Orbital Sciences	
28 October; 22:22:38	(United States) Cygnus CRS Orb-3; S.S. Deke Slayton	NASA	Intended: Low Earth (ISS)	ISS logistics	T+15 seconds	Launch failure
28 October; 22:22:38	First stage failure; rocket crashed near launch pad; estimated US$20 million in repairs to rebuild Pad 0A. Only flight of Antares 130.					
29 October; 07:09:43	(Russia) Soyuz-2.1a		(Kazakhstan) Baikonur Site 31/6		(Russia) Roskosmos	
29 October; 07:09:43	(Russia) Progress M-25M / 57P	Roskosmos	Low Earth (ISS)	ISS logistics	26 April 2015	Successful
29 October; 17:21:00	(United States) Atlas V 401		(United States) Cape Canaveral SLC-41		(United States) United Launch Alliance	
29 October; 17:21:00	(United States) USA-258 (GPS IIF-8)	U.S. Air Force	Medium Earth	Navigation	In orbit	Operational
29 October; 17:21:00	Named after Star Spica.					
30 October; 01:42:52	(Russia) Soyuz-2.1a / Fregat		(Russia) Plesetsk Site 43/4		(Russia) RVSN RF	
30 October; 01:42:52	(Russia) Meridian 7	VKO	Molniya	Communications	In orbit	Operational
← Jan; Feb; Mar; Apr; May; Jun; Jul; Aug; Sep; Oct; Nov; Dec →; === November ===
6 November; 07:35:49	(Ukraine) Dnepr		(Russia) Dombarovsky Site 13		(Russia) (Ukraine) ISC Kosmotras	
6 November; 07:35:49	(Japan) Asnaro-1 (Sasuke)	USEF	Low Earth (SSO)	Remote sensing	In orbit	Operational
6 November; 07:35:49	(Japan) ChubuSat 1 (Kinshachi 1)	Nagoya University	Low Earth (SSO)	Technology demonstration	In orbit	Operational
6 November; 07:35:49	(Japan) Hodoyoshi 1	University of Tokyo	Low Earth (SSO)	Technology demonstration	In orbit	Operational
6 November; 07:35:49	(Japan) QSAT-EOS (Tsukushi)	Kyushu University	Low Earth (SSO)	Technology demonstration	3 December 2023	Successful
6 November; 07:35:49	(Japan) TSUBAME	TIT / JAXA	Low Earth (SSO)	Gamma-ray astronomy	In orbit	Operational
14 November; 18:53:05	(China) Long March 2C		(China) Taiyuan LC-9		(China) CALT	
14 November; 18:53:05	(China) Yaogan 23	CAST	Low Earth (SSO)	Reconnaissance	In orbit	Operational
20 November; 07:12:03	(China) Long March 2D		(China) Jiuquan SLS-2		(China) SAST	
20 November; 07:12:03	(China) Yaogan 24	CAST	Low Earth (SSO)	Reconnaissance	In orbit	Operational
21 November; 06:37:08	(China) Kuaizhou-1		(China) Jiuquan LS-95B		(China) CASIC	
21 November; 06:37:08	(China) Kuaizhou-2	CAS	Low Earth (SSO)	Optical imaging	9 October 2016	Successful
23 November; 21:01:14	(Russia) Soyuz-FG		(Kazakhstan) Baikonur Site 31/6		(Russia) Roskosmos	
23 November; 21:01:14	(Russia) Soyuz TMA-15M	Roskosmos	Low Earth (ISS)	Expedition 42 / 43	11 June 2015; 13:44	Successful
23 November; 21:01:14	Crewed flight with three cosmonauts.					
30 November; 21:52:26	(Russia) Soyuz-2.1b / Fregat		(Russia) Plesetsk Site 43/4		(Russia) RVSN RF	
30 November; 21:52:26	(Russia) Kosmos 2501 (GLONASS-K 702)	VKO	Medium Earth	Navigation	In orbit	Operational
← Jan; Feb; Mar; Apr; May; Jun; Jul; Aug; Sep; Oct; Nov; Dec →; === December ===
3 December; 04:22:04	(Japan) H-IIA 202		(Japan) Tanegashima Y1		(Japan) Mitsubishi Heavy Industries	
3 December; 04:22:04	(Japan) Hayabusa2	JAXA	Heliocentric	Asteroid sample return	In orbit	Operational
3 December; 04:22:04	(Japan) DCAM3	JAXA	Heliocentric	Asteroid probe	In orbit	Successful
3 December; 04:22:04	(Japan) MINERVA-II-1 Rover 1A	JAXA	Heliocentric (162173 Ryugu)	Asteroid lander	In orbit	Successful
3 December; 04:22:04	(Japan) MINERVA-II-1 Rover 1B	JAXA	Heliocentric (162173 Ryugu)	Asteroid lander	In orbit	Successful
3 December; 04:22:04	(Japan) MINERVA-II Rover 2	JAXA	Heliocentric (162173 Ryugu)	Asteroid lander	In orbit	Spacecraft failure
3 December; 04:22:04	(Germany) (France) MASCOT	DLR / CNES	Heliocentric (162173 Ryugu)	Asteroid lander	In orbit	Successful
3 December; 04:22:04	(Japan) Shin'en 2	Kyutech	Heliocentric	Technology demonstration		
3 December; 04:22:04	(Japan) Despatch (Artsat 2)	Tamabi / UT	Heliocentric	Technology demonstration	In orbit	Successful
3 December; 04:22:04	(Japan) PROCYON	UT	Heliocentric	Technology demonstration / Asteroid flyby	In orbit	Partial spacecraft failure
3 December; 04:22:04	DCAM3, MINERVA-II (Rover 1A, 1B, 2), and MASCOT are carried aboard Hayabusa2 to be deployed in proximity or onto the surface of asteroid 162173 Ryugu. MINERVA-II Rover 1A and 1B were deployed on 21 September 2018. MASCOT was deployed on 3 October 2018.					
5 December; 12:05:00	(United States) Delta IV Heavy		(United States) Cape Canaveral SLC-37B		(United States) United Launch Alliance	
5 December; 12:05:00	(United States) EFT-1	NASA	HEO	Technology demonstration	5 December 2014; 16:29	Successful
5 December; 12:05:00	First test flight of Orion spacecraft					
6 December; 20:40:07	(France) Ariane 5 ECA		(France) Kourou ELA-3		(France) Arianespace	
6 December; 20:40:07	(United States) DirecTV-14	DirecTV	Geosynchronous	Communications	In orbit	Operational
6 December; 20:40:07	(India) GSAT-16	ISRO	Geosynchronous	Communications	In orbit	Operational
7 December; 03:26:04	(China) Long March 4B		(China) Taiyuan LC-9		(China) SAST	
7 December; 03:26:04	(China) (Brazil) CBERS-4	CASC / INPE	Low Earth (SSO)	Remote sensing	In orbit	Operational
10 December; 19:33:03	(China) Long March 4C		(China) Jiuquan SLS-2		(China) SAST	
10 December; 19:33:03	(China) Yaogan 25A	CAST	Low Earth	ELINT	In orbit	Operational
10 December; 19:33:03	(China) Yaogan 25B	CAST	Low Earth	ELINT	In orbit	Operational
10 December; 19:33:03	(China) Yaogan 25C	CAST	Low Earth	ELINT	In orbit	Operational
13 December; 03:19:00	(United States) Atlas V 541		(United States) Vandenberg SLC-3E		(United States) United Launch Alliance	
13 December; 03:19:00	(United States) USA-259 (NRO L-35)	NRO	Molniya	ELINT	In orbit	Operational
13 December; 03:19:00	NRO Launch 35					
15 December; 00:16:00	(Russia) Proton-M / Briz-M		(Kazakhstan) Baikonur Site 81/24		(Russia) Khrunichev	
15 December; 00:16:00	(Russia) Yamal-401	Gazprom Space Systems	Geosynchronous	Communications	In orbit	Operational
18 December; 18:37:00	(Russia) Soyuz-STB / Fregat		(France) Kourou ELS		(France) Arianespace	
18 December; 18:37:00	(Jersey) O3b FM9	O3b Networks	Medium Earth	Communications	In orbit	Operational
18 December; 18:37:00	(Jersey) O3b FM10	O3b Networks	Medium Earth	Communications	In orbit	Operational
18 December; 18:37:00	(Jersey) O3b FM11	O3b Networks	Medium Earth	Communications	In orbit	Operational
18 December; 18:37:00	(Jersey) O3b FM12	O3b Networks	Medium Earth	Communications	In orbit	Operational
19 December; 04:43:33	(Russia) Strela		(Kazakhstan) Baikonur Site 175/59		(Russia) Roskosmos	
19 December; 04:43:33	(Russia) (South Africa) Kondor-E	Roskosmos / DoD	Low Earth	Synthetic-aperture radar imaging	22 October 2022	Successful
23 December; 05:57:00	(Russia) Angara A5 / Briz-M		(Russia) Plesetsk Site 35/1		(Russia) Khrunichev	
23 December; 05:57:00	(Russia) IPM №1 (MGM №1)	Khrunichev	Geosynchronous	Test flight	In orbit	Successful
23 December; 05:57:00	Maiden flight of Angara A5					
25 December; 03:01:13	(Russia) Soyuz-2.1b		(Russia) Plesetsk Site 43/4		(Russia) RVSN RF	
25 December; 03:01:13	(Russia) Kosmos 2502 (Lotos-S)	VKO	Low Earth	ELINT	In orbit	Operational
26 December; 18:55:50	(Russia) Soyuz-2.1b		(Kazakhstan) Baikonur Site 31/6		(Russia) Roskosmos	
26 December; 18:55:50	(Russia) Resurs-P No.2	Roskosmos	Low Earth (SSO)	Remote sensing	11 February 2025; 22:33	Successful
27 December; 03:22:04	(China) Long March 4B		(China) Taiyuan LC-9		(China) SAST	
27 December; 03:22:04	(China) Yaogan 26	CAST	Low Earth (SSO)	Reconnaissance	In orbit	Operational
27 December; 21:37:49	(Russia) Proton-M / Briz-M		(Kazakhstan) Baikonur Site 200/39		(Russia) (United States) International Launch Services	
27 December; 21:37:49	(Luxembourg) Astra 2G	SES S.A.	Geosynchronous	Communications	In orbit	Operational
31 December; 01:02:04	(China) Long March 3A		(China) Xichang LC-2		(China) CALT	
31 December; 01:02:04	(China) Fengyun 2G	CMA	Geosynchronous	Meteorology	In orbit	Operational

- ← Jan
- Feb
- Mar
- Apr
- May
- Jun
- Jul
- Aug
- Sep
- Oct
- Nov
- Dec →

== Suborbital flights ==
Date and time (UTC)	Rocket	Flight number	Launch site		LSP	
Date and time (UTC)	Payload (⚀ = CubeSat)	Operator	Orbit	Function	Decay (UTC)	Outcome
Date and time (UTC)	Remarks					
3 January	(Israel) Arrow III		(Israel) Negev		(Israel) IAI	
3 January		IAI / IDF	Suborbital	ABM Test	3 January	Successful
3 January	Second flight test of the Arrow-III					
7 January	(India) Prithvi II		(India) Integrated Test Range Launch Complex 3		(India) DRDO	
7 January		DRDO	Suborbital	Missile test	7 January	Successful
7 January	Apogee: ~100 kilometres (62 mi)					
15 January; 09:09	(United States) Terrier-Orion		(United States) Wallops Island		(United States) TBD	
15 January; 09:09		DOD	Suborbital	Classified	15 January	Successful
15 January; 09:09	FTX-18 target, apogee: ~130 kilometres (81 mi)?					
15 January; 09:09	(United States) Terrier-Orion		(United States) Wallops Island		(United States) TBD	
15 January; 09:09		DOD	Suborbital	Classified	15 January	Successful
15 January; 09:09	FTX-18 target, apogee: ~130 kilometres (81 mi)?					
15 January; 09:09	(United States) Terrier-Orion		(United States) Wallops Island		(United States) TBD	
15 January; 09:09		DOD	Suborbital	Classified	15 January	Successful
15 January; 09:09	FTX-18 target, apogee: ~130 kilometres (81 mi)?					
20 January; 05:22	(India) Agni-IV		(India) Integrated Test Range		(India) DRDO	
20 January; 05:22		DRDO	Suborbital	Missile Test	20 January	Successful
20 January; 05:22	Apogee: ~850 kilometres (530 mi)					
3 March; 11:09	(Canada) Black Brant IX		(United States) Poker Flat		(United States) NASA	
3 March; 11:09	(United States) GREECE	SwRI	Suborbital	Auroral research	3 March	Successful
3 March; 11:09	Apogee: 335 kilometres (208 mi)					
3 March	(North Korea) Hwasong-6		(North Korea) Kalma Airport		(North Korea) Korean People's Army Strategic Force	
3 March	(North Korea)	Korean People's Army Strategic Force	Suborbital	Missile test	3 March	Successful
3 March	Apogee: 150 kilometres (93 mi).					
4 March; 18:10	(Russia) RS-12M Topol		(Russia) Kapustin Yar		(Russia) RVSN	
4 March; 18:10		RVSN	Suborbital	Missile test	4 March	Successful
24 March	(India) K-4		(India) Visakhapatnam		(India) Indian Navy	
24 March		Indian Navy	Suborbital	Missile test	24 March	Successful
24 March	First launch of the new Indian K-4 SLBM					
26 March; 13:34	Taiwan Sounding Rocket	Sounding Rocket IX	(Taiwan) Jiu Peng Air Base		(Taiwan) NSPO	
26 March; 13:34		NSPO/NCU	Suborbital	Ionospheric research	26 March	Successful
26 March; 13:34	Apogee: 286 km (178 mi)					
26 March; 22:25	(Russia) MN-300		(Russia) Kapustin Yar		(Russia) Roshydromet	
26 March; 22:25	(Russia) MR-30	Roshydromet	Suborbital	Meteorology; Test flight	26 March	Launch failure
26 March; 22:25	Apogee: 300 kilometres (190 mi), rocket failed and landed near a village in an unplanned area of western Kazakhstan.					
26 March	(North Korea) Hwasong-7		(North Korea) Sunchon Airport		(North Korea) Korean People's Army Strategic Force	
26 March	(North Korea)	Korean People's Army Strategic Force	Suborbital	Missile test	26 March	Successful
26 March	Apogee: 150 kilometres (93 mi). 1 of 2.					
26 March	(North Korea) Hwasong-7		(North Korea) Sunchon Airport		(North Korea) Korean People's Army Strategic Force	
26 March	(North Korea)	Korean People's Army Strategic Force	Suborbital	Missile test	26 March	Successful
26 March	Apogee: 150 kilometres (93 mi). 2 of 2.					
11 April; 23:10	(India) Agni-I		(India) Integrated Test Range		(India) IDRDL	
11 April; 23:10		IDRDL	Suborbital	Missile test	11 April	Successful
11 April; 23:10	Apogee: ~500 kilometres (310 mi)?					
14 April; 06:40	(Russia) RS-24 Yars		(Russia) Plesetsk		(Russia) RVSN	
14 April; 06:40		RVSN	Suborbital	Missile test	14 April	Successful
22 April	(Pakistan) Ghaznavi		(Pakistan) Sonmiani		(Pakistan) ASFC	
22 April		ASFC	Suborbital	Missile test	22 April	Successful
27 April; 03:37	(India) Prithvi-3?		(India) INS, Bay of Bengal		(India) DRDO	
27 April; 03:37	(India) SLTGT-02	DRDO	Suborbital	Target	27 April	Successful
27 April; 03:37	Apogee: 150 kilometres (93 mi)Target for ABM test, successfully intercepted					
27 April; 03:40	(India) Prithvi-2?		(India) ITR IC-4		(India) DRDO	
27 April; 03:40	(India) PDV	DRDO	Suborbital	Interceptor	27 April	Successful
27 April; 03:40	Apogee: 120 kilometres (75 mi), successful intercept					
3 May; 08:00	(Canada) Black Brant IX		(United States) White Sands		(United States) NASA	
3 May; 08:00	(United States) HYPE	University of Arizona	Suborbital	Astronomy	3 May	Successful
3 May; 08:00	Apogee: 278 kilometres (173 mi)					
8 May	(Russia) RT-2PM Topol		(Russia) Plesetsk		(Russia) RVSN	
8 May		RVSN	Suborbital	Missile test	8 May	Successful
8 May	(Russia) R-29RMU Sineva		(Russia) K-114 Tula, Barents Sea		(Russia) VMF	
8 May		VMF	Suborbital	Missile test	8 May	Successful
8 May	(Russia) R-29R Volna		(Russia) K-223 Podolsk, Sea of Okhotsk		(Russia) VMF	
8 May		VMF	Suborbital	Missile test	8 May	Successful
8 May	(Pakistan) Ghaznavi		(Pakistan) Sonmiani		(Pakistan) ASFC	
8 May		ASFC	Suborbital	Missile test	8 May	Successful
20 May; 17:08	(Russia) RS-12M Topol		(Russia) Kapustin Yar		(Russia) RVSN	
20 May; 17:08		RVSN	Suborbital	Missile test	20 May	Successful
21 May; 05:35	(United States) SM-3-IB		(United States) Kauai		(United States) US Navy	
21 May; 05:35		US Navy	Suborbital	ABM test	21 May	Successful
21 May; 05:35	Maiden flight of Aegis Ashore Controlled Test Vehicle (AA CTV-01)					
24 May	(Canada) Black Brant IX		(United States) White Sands		(United States) NASA	
24 May	(United States) CHESS	CU Boulder	Suborbital	Astronomy	24 May	Successful
2 June	(United States) UGM-133 Trident II D5		(United States) USS West Virginia, ETR		(United States) US Navy	
2 June		US Navy	Suborbital	Test flight	2 June	Successful
2 June	Follow-on Commander's Evaluation Test ?					
2 June	(United States) UGM-133 Trident II D5		(United States) USS West Virginia, ETR		(United States) US Navy	
2 June		US Navy	Suborbital	Test flight	2 June	Successful
2 June	Follow-on Commander's Evaluation Test ?					
22 June; 18:49	(United States) UGM-96 Trident I C4 (LV-2)	FTG-06b	(Marshall Islands) Meck		(United States) MDA	
22 June; 18:49		MDA	Suborbital	ABM target	22 June	Successful
22 June; 18:55	(United States) Ground Based Interceptor	FTG-06b	(United States) Vandenberg LF-23		(United States) MDA	
22 June; 18:55		MDA	Suborbital	ABM test	22 June	Successful
22 June; 18:55	FTG-06b interceptor, successful intercept					
26 June; 11:21	(United States) Terrier Improved Orion		(United States) Wallops Island		(United States) NASA	
26 June; 11:21	(United States) RockOn	CU Boulder	Suborbital	Student experiments	26 June	Successful
26 June; 11:21	Apogee: ~118 kilometres (73 mi)					
29 June	(North Korea) Hwasong-6		(North Korea) Masikryong		(North Korea) Korean People's Army Strategic Force	
29 June	(North Korea)	Korean People's Army Strategic Force	Suborbital	Missile test	29 June	Successful
29 June	Apogee: 150 kilometres (93 mi). 1 of 2.					
29 June	(North Korea) Hwasong-6		(North Korea) Masikryong		(North Korea) Korean People's Army Strategic Force	
29 June	(North Korea)	Korean People's Army Strategic Force	Suborbital	Missile test	29 June	Successful
29 June	Apogee: 150 kilometres (93 mi). 2 of 2.					
2 July; 08:36	(United States) Terrier-Improved Malemute		(United States) Wallops Island		(United States) NASA	
2 July; 08:36	(United States) SubTec-6	NASA WFF	Suborbital	Student experiments	2 July	Launch failure
2 July; 08:36	Second stage failure after 19 seconds of flight					
9 July; 12:00:00	(Russia) Angara-1.2pp		(Russia) Plesetsk Site 35/1		(Russia) VKO	
9 July; 12:00:00		VKO	Suborbital	Test flight	9 July	Successful
9 July; 12:00:00	Maiden flight of Angara rocket family					
9 July	(North Korea) Hwasong-6		(North Korea) Hwangju		(North Korea) Korean People's Army Strategic Force	
9 July	(North Korea)	Korean People's Army Strategic Force	Suborbital	Missile test	9 July	Successful
9 July	Apogee: 100 kilometres (62 mi). 1 of 2.					
9 July	(North Korea) Hwasong-6		(North Korea) Hwangju		(North Korea) Korean People's Army Strategic Force	
9 July	(North Korea)	Korean People's Army Strategic Force	Suborbital	Missile test	9 July	Successful
9 July	Apogee: 100 kilometres (62 mi). 2 of 2.					
13 July	(North Korea) Hwasong-6		(North Korea) Kaesong		(North Korea) Korean People's Army Strategic Force	
13 July	(North Korea)	Korean People's Army Strategic Force	Suborbital	Missile test	13 July	Successful
13 July	Apogee: 120 kilometres (75 mi).					
14 July	(United States) GoFast		(United States) Black Rock Desert, Nevada, USA		(United States) CSXT	
14 July	(United States)	CSXT	Suborbital	Test spacecraft	14 July	Successful
14 July	Second GoFast amateur space launch (apogee: 117 km)					
22 July; 19:10	(Canada) Black Brant IX		(United States) White Sands		(United States) NASA	
22 July; 19:10	(United States) DFS	USC	Suborbital	Solar	22 July	Successful
22 July; 19:10	Apogee: 320 kilometres (200 mi)					
23 July	(China) B-611		(China) Shuangchengzi		(China) PLA	
23 July		PLA	Suborbital	ABM target	23 July	Successful
23 July	Target					
23 July	(China) SC-19		(China) Korla		(China) PLA	
23 July		PLA	Suborbital	ABM test	23 July	Successful
23 July	Interceptor, successful intercept					
4 August; 14:00:00	(Japan) S-310		(Japan) Uchinoura		(Japan) JAXA	
4 August; 14:00:00	(Japan)	University of Tokyo / JAXA / Waseda	Suborbital	Microgravity	4 August	Successful
4 August; 14:00:00	Apogee: 117 kilometres (73 mi)					
17 August; 10:10:00	(Japan) S-520		(Japan) Uchinoura		(Japan) JAXA	
17 August; 10:10:00	(Japan)	University of Tokyo / Hokkaido University / Tohoku University / TPU / Tokai / JAXA	Suborbital	Ionosphere research	17 August	Successful
17 August; 10:10:00	Apogee: 243 kilometres (151 mi)					
23 August; 13:13	(United States) Terrier-Lynx		(United States) Wallops Island		(United States) DoD	
23 August; 13:13	(United States) Shark	DoD	Suborbital	Radar target	23 August	Successful
23 August; 13:13	Apogee: ~150 kilometres (93 mi)?					
25 August; 08:25	(United States) UGM-27 Polaris (STARS)		(United States) Kodiak LP-2		(United States) US Air Force	
25 August; 08:25	(United States) AHW FT2	US Army	Suborbital	Technology demonstration	25 August	Launch failure
25 August; 08:25	Launch vehicle went off course and was destroyed four seconds after launch					
28 August; 09:00	(Canada) Black Brant IX		(United States) Wallops Island		(United States) NASA	
28 August; 09:00	(United States)	NASA WFF	Suborbital	Technology demonstration	28 August	Successful
28 August; 09:00	Apogee: ~350 kilometres (220 mi)					
2 September; 02:02	(Brazil) VS-30/EPL		(Brazil) Alcântara		(Brazil) AEB	
2 September; 02:02	(Brazil) EPL-ME	INPE	Suborbital	Test	2 September	Successful
2 September; 02:02	Apogee: 130 kilometres (81 mi)?					
9 September	(Israel) Blue Sparrow		F-15 Eagle, Israel		(Israel) IAF	
9 September		Israeli Air Force	Suborbital	ABM target	9 September	Successful
9 September	Arrow-2 target, intercept failed, Apogee: ~100 kilometres (62 mi)?					
10 September	(Russia) RSM-56 Bulava		(Russia) K-551 Vladimir Monomakh, White Sea		(Russia) VMF	
10 September		VMF	Suborbital	Missile test	10 September	Successful
11 September; 05:41	(India) Agni-I		(India) Integrated Test Range		(India) IDRDL	
11 September; 05:41		IDRDL	Suborbital	Missile test	11 September	Successful
11 September; 05:41	Apogee: ~500 kilometres (310 mi)?					
22 September; 13:00	(United States) UGM-133 Trident II D5		(United States) Submarine, Pacific Ocean		(United States) US Navy	
22 September; 13:00		US Navy	Suborbital	Missile test	22 September	Successful
22 September; 13:00	(United States) UGM-133 Trident II D5		(United States) Submarine, Pacific Ocean		(United States) US Navy	
22 September; 13:00		US Navy	Suborbital	Missile test	22 September	Successful
22 September; 13:00	(United States) UGM-133 Trident II D5		(United States) Submarine, Pacific Ocean		(United States) US Navy	
22 September; 13:00		US Navy	Suborbital	Missile test	22 September	Successful
23 September; 14:45	(United States) LGM-30G Minuteman III		(United States) Vandenberg LF-09		(United States) US Air Force	
23 September; 14:45		US Air Force	Suborbital	Test flight	23 September	Successful
23 September; 14:45	GT211GM, Apogee: ~1,300 kilometres (810 mi) ?					
30 September	(Canada) Black Brant IX		(United States) White Sands		(United States) NASA	
30 September	(United States) VAULT 2.0	NRL	Suborbital	Solar	30 September	Successful
30 September	Apogee: 290 kilometres (180 mi)					
7 October; 13:10	Taiwan Sounding Rocket	Sounding Rocket X	(Taiwan) Jiu Peng Air Base		(Taiwan) NSPO	
7 October; 13:10		NSPO	Suborbital	Ionospheric research	7 October	Successful
7 October; 13:10	Apogee: 286 km (178 mi)					
12 October; 04:27	(United States) Terrier-Lynx		(United States) Wallops Island		(United States) DoD	
12 October; 04:27	(United States) Shark	DoD	Suborbital	Radar target	12 October	Successful
12 October; 04:27	Apogee: ~150 kilometres (93 mi)?					
17 October; 07:08	(United States) MRBM-T3 ?		(United States) Kauai		(United States) MDA	
17 October; 07:08		MDA	Suborbital	Radar target	17 October	Successful
17 October; 07:08	Medium Range Ballistic Missile Target, Aegis radar target FTX-20					
23 October; 13:33	(United States) SpaceLoft XL		(United States) Spaceport America		(United States) UP Aerospace	
23 October; 13:33	(United States) FOP-3	NASA	Suborbital	Four technology experiments	23 October	Successful
23 October; 13:33	Mission SL-9, Apogee: 124 kilometres (77 mi), successfully recovered					
29 October; 17:27:00	(Russia) RSM-56 Bulava		(Russia) K-535 Yuri Dolgorukiy, White Sea		(Russia) VMF	
29 October; 17:27:00		VMF	Suborbital	Missile test	29 October	Successful
1 November; 06:20	(Russia) RS-12M Topol		(Russia) Plesetsk		(Russia) RVSN	
1 November; 06:20		RVSN	Suborbital	Missile test	1 November	Successful
5 November	(Russia) R-29RMU Sineva		(Russia) K-114 Tula, Barents Sea		(Russia) VMF	
5 November		VMF	Suborbital	Missile test	5 November	Successful
6 November; 19:07	(Canada) Black Brant IX		(United States) White Sands		(United States) NASA	
6 November; 19:07	(United States) RAISE 2	SwRI	Suborbital	Solar	6 November	Successful
6 November; 19:07	Apogee: 300 kilometres (190 mi)					
6 November; 22:03	(United States) Terrier-Oriole ?	FTM-25	(United States) Kauai		(United States) MDA	
6 November; 22:03		MDA	Suborbital	ABM target	6 November	Successful
6 November; 22:03	SM-3 Block 1B target					
6 November; 22:06	(United States) RIM-161C Standard Missile 3 Block 1B	FTM-25	(United States) USS John Paul Jones, Pacific Ocean		(United States) US Navy	
6 November; 22:06		US Navy	Suborbital	ABM test	6 November	Successful
6 November; 22:06	FTM-25 interceptor, successful intercept					
9 November; 04:10	(India) Agni II		(India) Integrated Test Range		(India) Indian Army / DRDO	
9 November; 04:10		Indian Army/DRDO	Suborbital	Missile test	9 November	Successful
13 November	(Pakistan) Shaheen-II		(Pakistan) Sonmiani		(Pakistan) ASFC	
13 November		ASFC	Suborbital	Missile test	13 November	Successful
14 November	(India) Prithvi II		(India) Integrated Test Range Launch Complex 3		(India) DRDO	
14 November		DRDO	Suborbital	Missile test	14 November	Successful
14 November	Apogee: ~100 kilometres (62 mi)					
14 November	(India) Dhanush		(India) Ship, Indian Ocean		(India) DRDO	
14 November		DRDO	Suborbital	Target	14 November	Successful
14 November	Apogee: ~100 kilometres (62 mi)					
17 November	(Pakistan) Shaheen-IA		(Pakistan) Sonmiani		(Pakistan) ASFC	
17 November		ASFC	Suborbital	Missile test	17 November	Successful
24 November; 08:05	(Canada) Black Brant XIIA		(Norway) Andøya		(United States) NASA	
24 November; 08:05	(United States) C-REX	UAF	Suborbital	Geospace	24 November	Successful
24 November; 08:05	Apogee: 486 kilometres (302 mi)					
28 November	(Russia) RSM-56 Bulava		(Russia) K-550 Aleksandr Nevskiy, White Sea		(Russia) VMF	
28 November		VMF	Suborbital	Missile test	28 November	Successful
2 December; 04:49	(India) Agni-IV		(India) Integrated Test Range		(India) DRDO	
2 December; 04:49		DRDO	Suborbital	Missile Test	2 December	Successful
2 December; 04:49	Apogee: ~850 kilometres (530 mi)?					
11 December; 19:11	(Canada) Black Brant IX		(United States) White Sands		(United States) NASA	
11 December; 19:11	(United States) FOXSI	UC Berkeley	Suborbital	Solar research	11 December	Successful
11 December; 19:11	Apogee: 338 kilometres (210 mi)					
16 December	(Israel) Blue Sparrow		F-15 Eagle, Israel		(Israel) IAF	
16 December		Israeli Air Force	Suborbital	ABM target	16 December	Successful
16 December	Arrow-3 target, launch of Interceptor was scrubbed, Apogee: ~100 kilometres (62 mi)?					
17 December	(United States) Improved Orion		(United States) White Sands		(United States) NASA	
17 December	(United States) CTREX	DOD	Suborbital	Test flight	17 December	Successful
17 December	(United States) Taurion		(United States) White Sands		(United States) NASA	
17 December	(United States) Sprint 1	DOD	Suborbital	Test flight	17 December	Successful
17 December	First launch of a Taurion missile, a special low performing vehicle configuration for the development of the Sprint target vehicle					
18 December; 04:00:00	(India) LVM3		(India) Satish Dhawan SLP		(India) ISRO	
18 December; 04:00:00	(India) CARE	ISRO	Suborbital	Test flight	18 December	Successful
18 December; 04:00:00	First flight of LVM3 (earlier called GSLV Mk III). Sub-orbital test flight with dummy upper stage and ISRO Orbital Vehicle boilerplate Apogee: 125.5 km					
26 December; 08:02	(Russia) RS-24 Yars		(Russia) Plesetsk		(Russia) RVSN	
26 December; 08:02		RVSN	Suborbital	Missile test	26 December	Successful

== Deep space rendezvous ==
Date (GMT)	Spacecraft	Event	Remarks
1 January	Cassini	98th flyby of Titan	Closest approach: 1,400 kilometres (870 mi).
2 February	Cassini	99th flyby of Titan	Closest approach: 1,236 kilometres (768 mi).
6 March	Cassini	100th flyby of Titan	Closest approach: 1,500 kilometres (930 mi).
7 April	Cassini	101st flyby of Titan	Closest approach: 963 kilometres (598 mi).
17 May	Cassini	102nd flyby of Titan	Closest approach: 2,994 kilometres (1,860 mi).
18 June	Cassini	103rd flyby of Titan	Closest approach: 3,659 kilometres (2,274 mi).
20 July	Cassini	104th flyby of Titan	Closest approach: 5,103 kilometres (3,171 mi).
6 August	Rosetta	Enters orbit of 67P/Churyumov–Gerasimenko	First artificial satellite of a comet. Initial orbit was 100 kilometres (62 mi)high and was reduced to 30 kilometres (19 mi) until 10 September.
10 August	ISEE-3/ICE	flyby of Earth and Moon	Closest approach Earth: 178,400 kilometres (110,900 mi), closest approach Moon: 15,938 kilometres (9,903 mi).
21 August	Cassini	105th flyby of Titan	Closest approach: 964 kilometres (599 mi).
21 September	Cassini	106th flyby of Titan	Closest approach: 1,400 kilometres (870 mi).
22 September	MAVEN	Areocentric orbit injection	Preliminary orbit was 380 kilometres (240 mi) x 44,600 kilometres (27,700 mi), inclined 75 deg to the equator.
24 September	Mars Orbiter Mission	Areocentric orbit injection	India's first mission to Mars, preliminary orbit was 422 kilometres (262 mi) x 76,994 kilometres (47,842 mi), inclined 150 deg to the equator.
23 October	Cassini	107th flyby of Titan	Closest approach: 1,013 kilometres (629 mi).
28 October	Chang'e 5-T1	lunar flyby on a free return trajectory	Closest approach: 13,000 kilometres (8,100 mi).
12 November	Philae	Landing on 67P/Churyumov–Gerasimenko	First soft landing on a comet nucleus. Mission cut short when landing conditions resulted in its solar panels being out of position, depleting the lander's batteries. Data was still collected.
10 December	Cassini	108th flyby of Titan	Closest approach: 980 kilometres (610 mi).

== Extra-Vehicular Activities (EVAs) ==
Start date/time	Duration	End time	Spacecraft	Crew	Remarks
27 January; 14:00	6 hours 8 minutes	20:08	Expedition 38 / 39 ISS Pirs	(Russia) Oleg Kotov (Russia) Sergey Ryazansky	Installed High Resolution Camera (HRC) on SM Plane IV; installed Medium Resolution Camera (MRC) on SM Plane IV; photographed electrical connectors on ФП11 and ФП19 connector patch panels of SM; removed Worksite Interfaces (WIF) adaptor from SSRMS LEE B; retrieved СКК #2-СО cassette container from DC-1.
23 April; 13:56	1 hours 36 minutes	15:32	Expedition 39 / 40 ISS Quest	(United States) Richard Mastracchio (United States) Steven Swanson	Replaced failed Multiplexer/Demultiplexer (MDM) unit on S0 truss; also removed two lanyards from Secondary Power Distribution Assembly (SPDA) doors.
19 June; 14:10	7 hours 23 minutes	21:33	Expedition 40 / 41 ISS Pirs	(Russia) Alexander Skvortsov (Russia) Oleg Artemyev	Installed an automated phased antenna array used for the Russian command and telemetry system, relocated a part of the Obstanovka experiment that monitors charged particles and plasma in Low Earth Orbit, verifying the correct installation of the universal work platform (URM-D), taking samples from one of Zvezda's windows, and jettisoning an experiment frame.
18 August; 14:02	5 hours 11 minutes	19:13	Expedition 40 / 41 ISS Pirs	(Russia) Alexander Skvortsov (Russia) Oleg Artemyev	Released Chasqui-1 cubesat into space; installed experiment packages (EXPOSE-R2 biological experiment, Plume Impingement and Deposit Monitoring unit), retrieved experiments (Vinoslivost materials exposure panel, Biorisk biological experiment), replaced cassette on SKK experiment and attached a handrail on an antenna.
7 October; 12:30	6 hours 13 minutes	18:43	Expedition 41 / 42 ISS Quest	(United States) Reid Wiseman (Germany) Alexander Gerst	Re-located a failed pump module to a permanent stowage position, installed a back-up power supply for the Mobile Transporter and replaced a light on the robotic arm.
15 October; 12:16	6 hours 34 minutes	18:50	Expedition 41 / 42 ISS Quest	(United States) Reid Wiseman (United States) Barry E. Wilmore	Replaced failed sequential shunt unit (SSU) for 3A power system, relocated articulating portable foot restraint/tool stanchion (APFR/TS), removed camera port (CP) 7, relocated wireless video system external transceiver assembly (WETA) from CP8 to CP11, installed external TV camera group at CP8.
22 October; 13:28	3 hours 38 minutes	17:06	Expedition 41 / 42 ISS Pirs	(Russia) Maksim Surayev (Russia) Aleksandr Samokutyayev	Removed and jettisoned Radiometriya experiment from Zvezda Plane II, removed EXPOSE-R experiment protective cover, took surface samples from Pirs extravehicular hatch 2 window (TEST experiment), removed and jettisoned two KURS antennas 2ACф1-1 and 2ACф1-2 from Poisk, photographed exterior of ISS Russian segment.

== Orbital launch statistics ==
=== By country ===
For the purposes of this section, the yearly tally of orbital launches by country assigns each flight to the country of origin of the rocket, not to the launch services provider or the spaceport. For example, Soyuz launches by Arianespace in Kourou are counted under Russia because Soyuz-2 is a Russian rocket.

Country	Launches	Successes	Failures	Partial failures
China	16	16	0	0
France	6	6	0	0
India	4	4	0	0
Israel	1	1	0	0
Italy	1	1	0	0
Japan	4	4	0	0
Russia	34 (Note: Includes four European Soyuz launches from Kourou, French Guiana by Arianespace)	31	1	2
Ukraine	3 (Note: Zenit and Dnepr rockets were launched from Russia)	3	0	0
United States	23	22	1	0
World	92	88	2	2

=== By rocket ===
- Antares 100
- Ariane 5
- Atlas V
- Delta II
- Delta IV
- Delta IV Heavy
- Falcon 9
- H-IIA
- H-IIB
- Long March 2
- Long March 3
- Long March 4
- PSLV
- Soyuz-U
- Soyuz-FG
- Soyuz-2 (Russia)
- Soyuz ST (Europe)
- Dnepr
- Proton-M
- Rokot
- Strela
- Others

==== By family ====
Family	Country	Launches	Successes	Failures	Partial failures	Remarks
Angara	Russia	1	1	0	0	Maiden flight
Antares	United States	3	2	1	0	
Ariane	France	6	6	0	0	
Atlas	United States	9	9	0	0	
Delta	United States	5	5	0	0	
Falcon	United States	6	6	0	0	
GSLV	India	1	1	0	0	
H-II	Japan	4	4	0	0	
Kuaizhou	China	1	1	0	0	
Long March	China	15	15	0	0	
PSLV	India	3	3	0	0	
R-7	Russia	22	21	0	1	
R-36	Ukraine	2	2	0	0	
Shavit	Israel	1	1	0	0	
Universal Rocket	Russia	11	9	1	1	
Vega	Italy	1	1	0	0	
Zenit	Ukraine	1	1	0	0	

==== By type ====
Rocket	Country	Family	Launches	Successes	Failures	Partial failures	Remarks
Angara A5	Russia	Angara	1	1	0	0	Maiden flight
Antares	United States	Antares	3	2	1	0	
Ariane 5	France	Ariane	6	6	0	0	
Atlas V	United States	Atlas	9	9	0	0	
Delta II	United States	Delta	1	1	0	0	
Delta IV	United States	Delta	4	4	0	0	
Dnepr	Ukraine	R-36	2	2	0	0	
Falcon 9	United States	Falcon	6	6	0	0	
GSLV	India	GSLV	1	1	0	0	
Kuaizhou 1	China	Kuaizhou	1	1	0	0	
H-IIA	Japan	H-II	4	4	0	0	
Long March 2	China	Long March	6	6	0	0	
Long March 3	China	Long March	2	2	0	0	
Long March 4	China	Long March	7	7	0	0	
Proton	Russia	Universal Rocket	8	6	1	1	
PSLV	India	PSLV	3	3	0	0	
Shavit	Israel	Shavit	1	1	0	0	
Soyuz	Russia	R-7	8	8	0	0	
Soyuz-2	Russia	R-7	14	13	0	1	
UR-100	Russia	Universal Rocket	3	3	0	0	
Vega	Italy	Vega	1	1	0	0	
Zenit	Ukraine	Zenit	1	1	0	0	

==== By configuration ====
Rocket	Country	Type	Launches	Successes	Failures	Partial failures	Remarks
Angara A5 / Briz-M	Russia	Angara A5	1	1	0	0	Maiden flight
Antares 120	United States	Antares	2	2	0	0	
Antares 130	United States	Antares	1	0	1	0	Maiden flight
Ariane 5 ECA	France	Ariane 5	5	5	0	0	
Ariane 5 ES	France	Ariane 5	1	1	0	0	
Atlas V 401	United States	Atlas V	7	7	0	0	
Atlas V 541	United States	Atlas V	2	2	0	0	
Delta II 7320	United States	Delta II	1	1	0	0	
Delta IV Medium+ (4,2)	United States	Delta IV	3	3	0	0	
Delta IV Heavy	United States	Delta IV	1	1	0	0	
Dnepr	Ukraine	Dnepr	2	2	0	0	
Falcon 9 v1.1	United States	Falcon 9	6	6	0	0	
GSLV Mk II	India	GSLV	1	1	0	0	First successful launch
H-IIA 202	Japan	H-IIA	4	4	0	0	
Kuahzhou 1	China	Kuaizhou 1	1	1	0	0	
Long March 2C	China	Long March 2	4	4	0	0	
Long March 2D	China	Long March 2	2	2	0	0	
Long March 3A	China	Long March 3	1	1	0	0	
Long March 3C/E	China	Long March 3	1	1	0	0	Maiden flight
Long March 4B	China	Long March 4	4	4	0	0	
Long March 4C	China	Long March 4	3	3	0	0	
Proton-M / Briz-M	Russia	Proton	8	6	1	1	
PSLV-CA	India	PSLV	1	1	0	0	
PSLV-XL	India	PSLV	2	2	0	0	
Rokot / Briz-KM	Russia	UR-100	2	2	0	0	
Shavit-2	Israel	Shavit	1	1	0	0	
Soyuz-2.1a or ST-A	Russia	Soyuz-2	3	3	0	0	
Soyuz-2.1a or ST-A / Fregat-M	Russia	Soyuz-2	2	2	0	0	
Soyuz-2.1b or ST-B	Russia	Soyuz-2	2	2	0	0	
Soyuz-2.1b / Fregat-M	Russia	Soyuz-2	4	4	0	0	
Soyuz ST-B / Fregat-MT	Russia	Soyuz-2	3	2	0	1	
Soyuz-FG	Russia	Soyuz	4	4	0	0	
Soyuz-U	Russia	Soyuz	4	4	0	0	
Strela	Russia	UR-100	1	1	0	0	
Vega	Italy	Vega	1	1	0	0	
Zenit-3SL	Ukraine	Zenit	1	1	0	0	

=== By spaceport ===
- Jiuquan
- Taiyuan
- Xichang
- Kourou
- Satish Dhawan
- Ocean Odyssey
- Palmachim
- Tanegashima
- Uchinoura
- Baikonur
- Dombarovsky
- Plesetsk
- Cape Canaveral
- Kennedy
- MARS
- Vandenberg

Site	Country	Launches	Successes	Failures	Partial failures	Remarks
Baikonur	Kazakhstan	21	19	1	1	
Cape Canaveral	United States	16	16	0	0	
Dombarovsky	Russia	2	2	0	0	
Jiuquan	China	8	8	0	0	
Kourou	France	11	10	0	1	
MARS	United States	3	2	1	0	
Ocean Odyssey	(United Nations) International waters	1	1	0	0	
Palmachim	Israel	1	1	0	0	
Plesetsk	Russia	9	9	0	0	
Satish Dhawan	India	4	4	0	0	
Taiyuan	China	6	6	0	0	
Tanegashima	Japan	4	4	0	0	
Vandenberg	United States	4	4	0	0	
Xichang	China	2	2	0	0	
Total		92	88	2	2	

=== By orbit ===
- Transatmospheric
- Low Earth
- Low Earth (ISS)
- Low Earth (SSO)
- Low Earth (retrograde)
- Medium Earth
- Geosychronous
  (transfer)
- Inclined GSO
- High Earth
- Heliocentric

Orbital regime	Launches	Achieved	Not achieved	Accidentally achieved	Remarks
Transatmospheric	1	1	0	0	Deployed into a transatmospheric orbit via low and medium Earth orbits
Low Earth	49	48	1	0	14 to ISS (1 failure)
Medium Earth / Molniya	12	12	0	0	
Geosynchronous / GTO	28	27	1	0	
High Earth / Lunar transfer	1	1	0	0	
Heliocentric / Planetary transfer	1	1	0	0	
Total	92	90	2	0	
