= ALE-2 =

- Mission type: Space entertainment, atmospheric science
- Operator: ALE Co., LTD
- COSPAR ID: 2019-084A
- SATCAT no.: 44824
- Website: https://star-ale.com/en/technology/

Start of mission
- Launch date: 6 December 2019, 08:18 UTC
- Rocket: Electron
- Launch site: Rocket Lab LC-1
- Contractor: Rocket Lab

End of mission
- Disposal: Orbital re-entry
- Decay date: 19 April 2023

Orbital parameters
- Reference system: Geocentric
- Regime: Low Earth
- Inclination: 96.8°

ALE-2 was a satellite built and operated by ALE Co., LTD for space entertainment and atmospheric science. ALE-2 was intended to release metal particles into Earth's atmosphere to generate artificial meteors, but plans were cancelled due to a malfunction of the deployment system. ALE-2's artificial meteors were to be used to study re-entry dynamics and upper atmosphere phenomena.

== Overview ==
ALE-2 is ALE Co., LTD's second satellite, following the ALE-1 launched in January 2019. While ALE-1 was a rideshare payload and needed to first descend to a lower altitude to release the artificial meteors, ALE-2 was launched as a primary payload and was deployed directly to an altitude ideal for releasing the artificial meteors. Thus ALE-2 became ALE Co., LTD's first attempt at creating artificial meteors. The satellite was designed to controllably release particles in the direction opposite to its motion, allowing them to re-enter Earth's atmosphere as artificial meteors. ALE-2 was developed by ALE Co., LTD, along with the Tohoku University Space Robotics Laboratory and Nihon University.

On 6 December 2019, an Electron rocket sent ALE-2 to low Earth orbit as part of the ″Running Out Of Fingers″ launch. ALE-2 was placed into a 400 km (250 mi) orbit, lower than the International Space Station to eliminate any possibility that particles released by ALE-2 would pose a risk to the astronauts at the station. Unlike ALE-1, which had no on board propulsion, ALE-2 was equipped with thrusters to counter atmospheric drag and keep its altitude between 375 to 400 km (233 to 249 mi), the optimal height to release the artificial meteor particles.

On 4 April 2023, ALE ended the operations of ALE-2 as the orbital altitude of the satellite decreased following the depletion of onboard fuel. ALE-2 decayed from orbit on 19 April 2023.

== Spacecraft ==
ALE-2's satellite bus was developed by Tohoku University. The ALE-2 satellite is covered in gold plating for better thermal control.

For propulsion, the satellite was equipped with an ALEx supercritical thruster manufactured by Patchedconics, LLC. The ALEx engine was made from COTS components, and used a non-toxic green propellant. ALEx had a total of four thruster nozzles.

== Operation in orbit ==
In February 2020, ALE announced that a malfunction of the shooting star deployment mechanism prevented ALE-2 from releasing artificial meteor particles. Nevertheless, a simulation of the deployment was conducted in orbit. The satellite's thrusters experienced power failures while the satellite was in eclipse, as the DC/DC converter for the thrusters did not function properly when the battery voltage was too low.

== See also ==
- Raijin-2
- RAIKO (satellite)
