= Tsubame =

Tsubame (燕, tsubame) is the Japanese name for the barn swallow.

Tsubame may also refer to:

- Tsubame, Niigata, a city in Japan
- Tsubame (train), the name of a Japanese train service
- Tsubame Ozuno, a character in the anime and manga series Urusei Yatsura
- Sanjō Tsubame, a character in the anime and manga series Rurouni Kenshin
- Tsubame Otori, a character in the anime and manga series Akihabara Dennou Gumi (Cyber Team in Akihabara)
- Two different satellites commonly referred to as Tsubame:
  - TSUBAME (satellite), a small gamma-ray observatory
  - Super Low Altitude Test Satellite, an experimental satellite in very low Earth orbit
- Tsubame (supercomputer), a supercomputer in Japan
- Tsubame Mizusaki (水崎ツバメ), a character in the anime and manga series Keep Your Hands Off Eizouken!
- Tsubame Koyasu (子安つばめ), a character in the anime and manga series Kaguya-sama: Love Is War
- "Tsubame" (song), by Yoasobi from the EP The Book 2
