= Raijin (disambiguation) =

Raijin may refer to:

- Raijin (雷神), also known as Kaminari-sama (雷様), Raiden-sama (雷電様), Narukami (鳴る神) and Raikou (雷公), a god of lightning, thunder and storms in Japanese mythology and the Shinto religion.
- Akira Raijin, (川畑 顕, Kawabata Akira) (born July 17, 1978), a Japanese professional wrestler
- Raijin Comics, a manga anthology published in North America by the now-defunct Gutsoon! Entertainment
- Raijin (雷神), ring name of Sho Tanaka, a Japanese professional wrestler
- Raijin, a character in Final Fantasy VIII
- Raijin (comics), a character from DC Comics
- Raijin-2, a microsatellite

== See also ==
- Raijū, (雷獣, "thunder animal" or "thunder beast"), a legendary creature from Japanese mythology.
