= Crowdfunded satellites =

Satellite funding model

Crowdfunded satellites are artificial satellites that have been funded by using crowdfunding, rather than more traditional methods of financing by governments or corporations. Crowdfunded satellites are an example of public participation to research.

Several crowdfunded satellites were launched in the 2010s, including SkyCube, KickSat, ArduSat, all of which resulted from successful Kickstarter campaigns. The Russian Mayak mission used the Russian Boomstarter platform.

The Planetary Society's LightSail 2 mission may be the best known. In 2015, the project raised $1.2 million on Kickstarter from over 23,000 backers. It launched aboard a SpaceX Falcon Heavy on June 25th, 2019. The 3U-sized cubesat deployed a large solar sail after reaching orbit, which it successfully used to maintain its altitude. The spacecraft stayed in orbit for over 3 years, much longer than originally planned.
