= Progress M-25M =

Russian cargo spacecraft

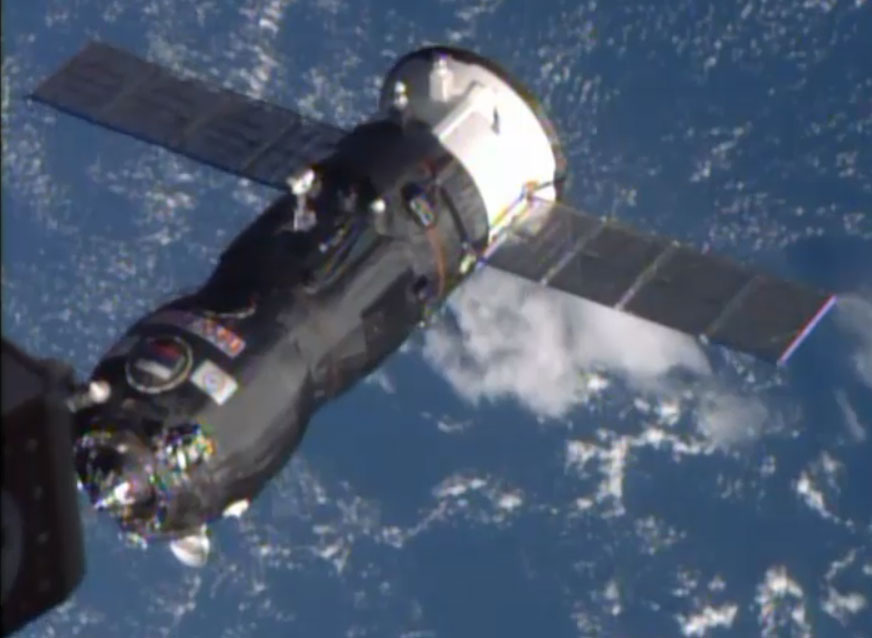
- Traveling at 420 km over the Atlantic Ocean, the Russian cargo ship docking to the Pirs module.
- Mission type: ISS resupply
- Operator: Roskosmos
- COSPAR ID: 2014-067A
- SATCAT no.: 40292
- Mission duration: 178 days

Spacecraft properties
- Spacecraft type: Progress-M s/n 425
- Manufacturer: RKK Energia
- Launch mass: 7290 kg

Start of mission
- Launch date: 29 October 2014, 07:09:43 UTC
- Rocket: Soyuz-2.1a
- Launch site: Baikonur, Site 31/6

End of mission
- Disposal: Deorbited
- Decay date: 26 April 2015, 13:00 UTC

Orbital parameters
- Reference system: Geocentric
- Regime: Low Earth
- Perigee altitude: 418.0 km
- Apogee altitude: 423.0 km
- Inclination: 51.67°
- Period: 92.85 minutes
- Epoch: 29 October 2014

Docking with ISS
- Docking port: Pirs
- Docking date: 29 October 2014, 13:08 UTC
- Undocking date: 25 April 2015, 06:41:14 UTC
- Time docked: 178 days

Cargo
- Mass: 2351 kg
- Pressurised: 1283 kg (dry cargo)
- Fuel: 880 kg
- Gaseous: 48 kg (oxygen and air)
- Water: 420 kg
- Progress ISS Resupply

Progress M-25M (Russian: Прогресс М-25М), identified by NASA as Progress 57P, is a Progress spacecraft used by Roskosmos to resupply the International Space Station (ISS) during 2014. Progress M-25M was launched on a six-hours rendezvous profile towards the ISS. The 25th Progress-M 11F615A60 spacecraft to be launched, it had the serial number 425 and was built by RKK Energia.

== Launch ==
The spacecraft was launched on 29 October 2014 at 07:09:43 UTC from the Baikonur Cosmodrome in Kazakhstan. This was the first time the upgraded Soyuz-2.1a rocket was used for an ISS mission launch.

== Docking ==
Traveling about 420 kilometres (260 mi) over the Atlantic Ocean, the unpiloted ISS Progress M-25M Russian cargo ship docked at 13:08 UTC on 29 October 2014 to the Pirs Docking Compartment of the International Space Station, less than six hours after launch.

== Cargo ==
The Progress spacecraft carries 2351 kg of cargo and supplies to the International Space Station. The craft is delivering food, fuel and supplies, including 880 kg of propellant; 22 kg of oxygen; 26 kg of air; 420 kg of water; and 1283 kg of spare parts, supplies and experiment hardware for the six members of the Expedition 41 crew currently living and working in space. Progress M-25M is scheduled to remain docked to Pirs for six months.

== See also ==
- 2014 in spaceflight
