= London Hackspace =

Non-profit hackerspace in United Kingdom

Coordinates: 51.5277788°N 0.2642050°W

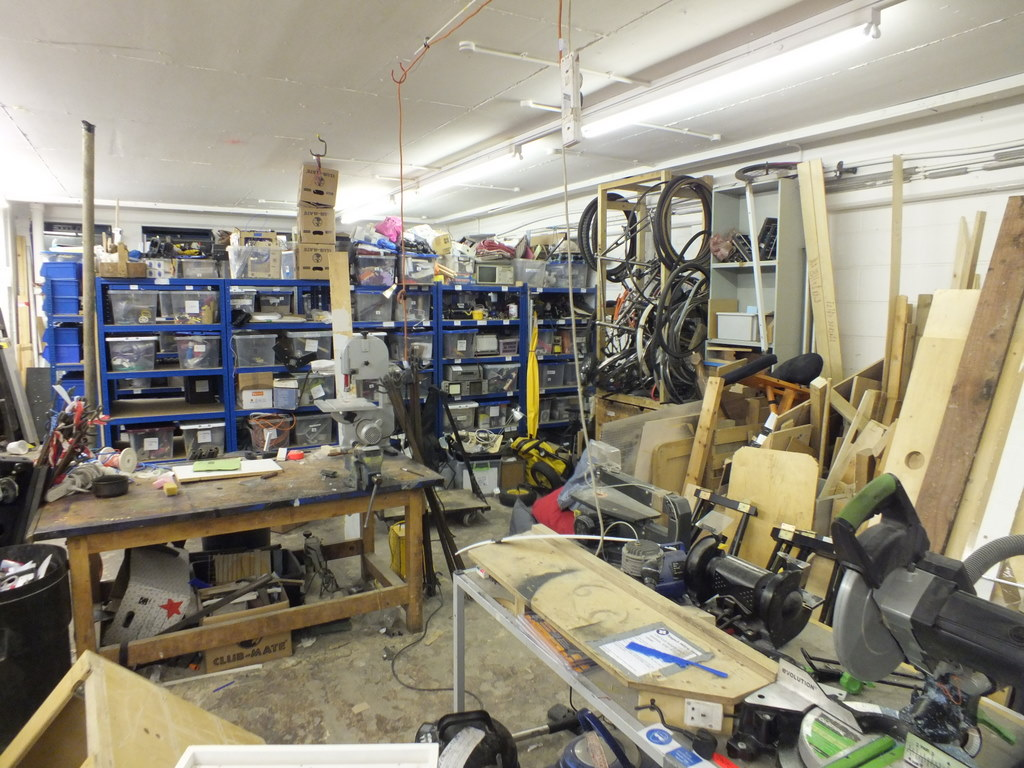
- The London Hackspace workshop
- Formation: 2009
- Purpose: Hacking, DIY
- Location: United Kingdom
- Origin: London
- Founders: Russ Garrett, Jonty Wareing
- Website: Homepage, Wiki

London Hackspace (abbreviated LHS) is a non–profit hackerspace in London, UK, established in 2009. Originally located in Islington, it moved to Hoxton in July 2010, and later to Park Royal. In 2012, it was the largest hackerspace in the United Kingdom by membership, with over 1000 paying members.

== Founding ==
The group held its first meeting at Ye Olde Cheshire Cheese on 10 February 2009.

== Organisational status ==
London Hackspace became the world's first virtualised non–profit corporation on 27 July 2011, when the members at the AGM voted to use the OneClickOrgs platform to carry out all the procedures of the board of directors.

== Facilities ==
London hackspace has a wide variety of facilities split across multiple sections, including equipment for electronics, 3D printing, craft, laser cutting, woodwork, metalwork, textile arts, amateur radio, robotics, and many other things. An incomplete list of equipment can be found on their wiki.

== Projects ==
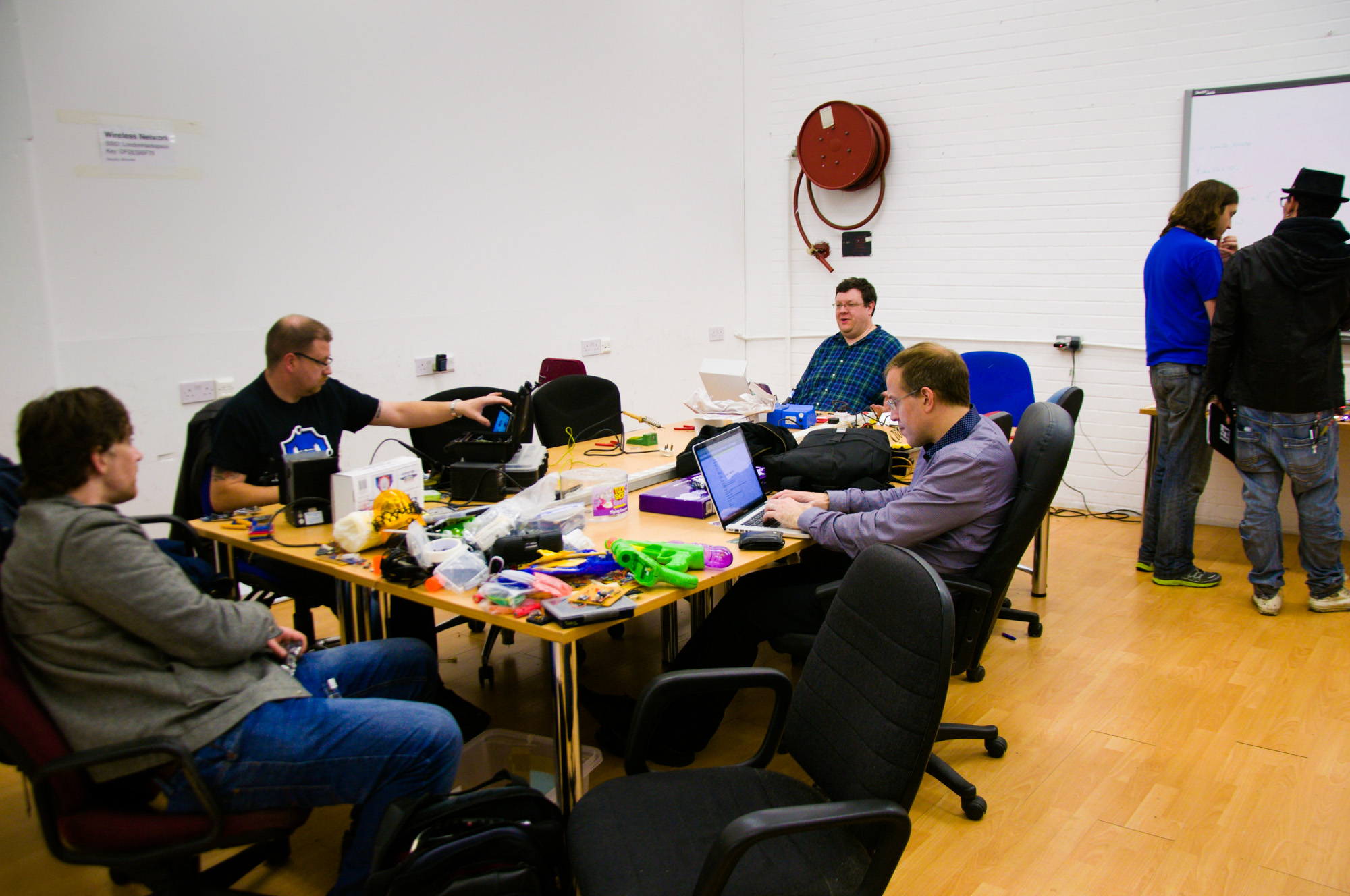
A soldering workshop at the Hackspace

- At Maker Faire 2011, members combined an Xbox Kinect and a pair of Tesla Coils to make an Evil Genius Simulator.
- HackSat One, a femtosatellite Sprite meant to be launched as part of the KickSat dispenser was developed at the space in 2013.
- The Nanode, a networked Arduino clone was developed at the space.

== Workshops & events ==
London Hackspace hosted regular workshops for Biohacking, Lockpicking, Amateur radio and Hacking on OneClickOrgs. Additional irregular workshops cover woodturning, machining, 3D printing, textile arts and welding.

There is also a regular Wednesday open evening event.
