= Lena Okajima =

- Born: February 19, 1979 (age 47); Tottori Prefecture, Japan
- Education: University of Tokyo, Ph.D. in Science
- Occupations: Founder and CEO of ALE Co,. Ltd

Lena Okajima (岡島 礼奈, Okajima Lena) is the founder and chief executive officer of ALE Co., Ltd.

== Career ==
Lena founded the Japanese space entertainment company, ALE Co., Ltd in 2011. Prior to ALE, she worked in bond investment and private equity at Goldman Sachs Japan.

She is also an entrepreneur who has founded an online gaming company and a business consulting company. She received her Ph.D. in Science from the University of Tokyo in 2008.

== ALE Co., Ltd. ==
ALE stands for Astro Live Experiences.

- 2001: Lena came up with an idea to create artificial shooting star while watching the Leonid meteor shower during her time as an undergraduate student at the University of Tokyo
- 2009: Started working on the artificial shooting star project
- 2011: Lena founded ALE Co., Ltd.
- 2015: Started full-scale commercialization of artificial shooting star technology
- 2019: Launch of first satellite ALE-1 on 18 January 2019 by an Epsilon rocket and launch of second satellite ALE-2 on 6 December 2019 by an Electron rocket.
- 2023: Premiering in Hiroshima

In 2020 it was published that the first artificial meteor shower would be delayed from 2020 to 2023 (to be conducted by the next satellite ALE-3) due to the malfunction of ALE-2 satellite; apparently also ALE-1 had malfunctioned (due to not being able to produce an artificial meteor shower).
