= KickSat =

Citizen science project

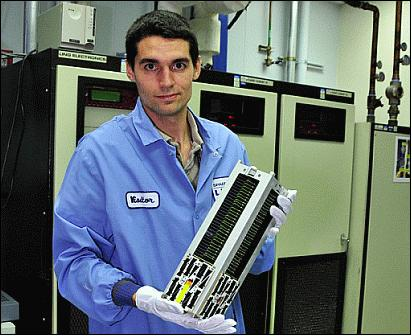
Zac Manchester and KickSat

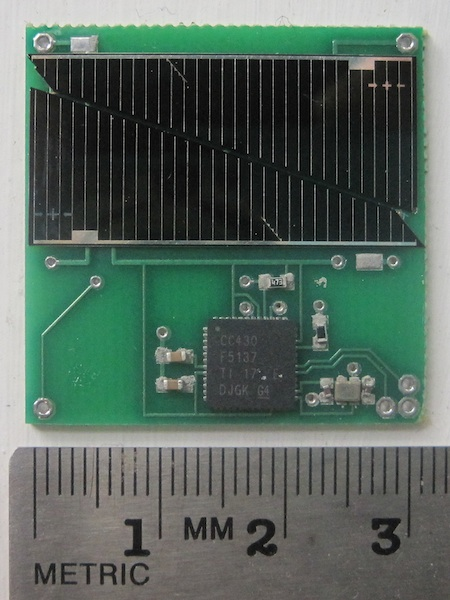
KickSat Sprite prototype

KickSat was a satellite dispenser for small-satellite (femtosatellite) project inaugurated in early October 2011, to launch many very small satellites from a 3U CubeSat. The satellites have been characterized as being the size of a large postage stamp. and also as "cracker size". The mission launch was originally scheduled for late 2013 and was launched April 18, 2014.

Kicksat reached its orbit and transmitted beacon signals that were received by radio amateurs. Telemetry data allowed the prediction of the orbit and the reentry on May 15, 2014, at about 01:30 UTC. Due to a non-redundant design, a timer reset while on-orbit and the femtosatellites were not deployed in time, and burned up inside the KickSat mothership when the undeployed satellite-deployment mechanism reentered Earth's atmosphere. It is one of several crowdfunded satellites launched during the 2010s.

== History ==
The project was crowdfunded through Kickstarter. The project was advertised with the goal of reducing the cost of spaceflight so that it could be affordable on an individual basis.

== Design ==
In its minimal configuration, each Sprite femtosatellite will be designed to send a very short message (a few bytes long) to a network of ground stations. The chipset of use is a TI CC430F5137 (MCU + RF) with codebase from panStamp. Firmware developer kits were sent to donors who contributed enough to qualify for customizing their own Sprite.

Sprites can be organized into fleets; one of them was to be named for the British Interplanetary Society. London Hackspace had begun work on its own ground station.

== Inaugural mission ==
KickSat launched on an ISS commercial resupply mission, SpaceX CRS-3, originally scheduled for late 2013, but ultimately delayed until April 18, 2014. On April 30, 2014, the microcontroller managing the master clock was found to have reset due to a technical problem, an effect of space radiation. This reset added two weeks to the deployment schedule for the sprites, and started a race against time to charge KickSat's battery enough to power deployment of the sprites before KickSat began atmospheric reentry. On May 14, 2014, KickSat reentered the atmosphere and burned up; all sprites were lost.

== Other missions ==
Sprites were launched on board the Space Shuttle Endeavour during STS-134 in May 2011, and spent three years mounted to the outside of the ISS as part of the eighth Materials International Space Station Experiment. Upon their return to Earth, they were still functional. This verified the design could survive the space environment for far longer than the planned nominal mission length.

In 2016, the KickSat Sprite was discussed as an early-stage prototype of the interstellar probe proposed for Breakthrough Starshot.

On June 23, 2017, the PSLV-C38 launch carried 31 satellites into low Earth orbit. Among them were Max Valier, built by OHB of (Germany) and Venta-1 which were carrying six sprite spacecraft as secondary payloads.

After being shortlisted in February 2015 by NASA under its CubeSat Launch Initiative, KickSat-2 was launched aboard Cygnus NG-10 SS John Glenn on November 17, 2018. After detaching from the ISS, the free-flying Cygnus spacecraft deployed KickSat-2 at an altitude of 300 km on February 13, 2019. KickSat-2 established communication with ground controllers soon after, reporting good health despite a weaker than expected signal. On March 18, 2019, KickSat-2 deployed 105 Sprites which successfully transmitted data before reentering the atmosphere.
