= Tethered formation flying =

Tethered formation flying is one of applications for space tethers. This sub-set represents an entire area of research using a non-conductive tether to connect multiple spacecraft.

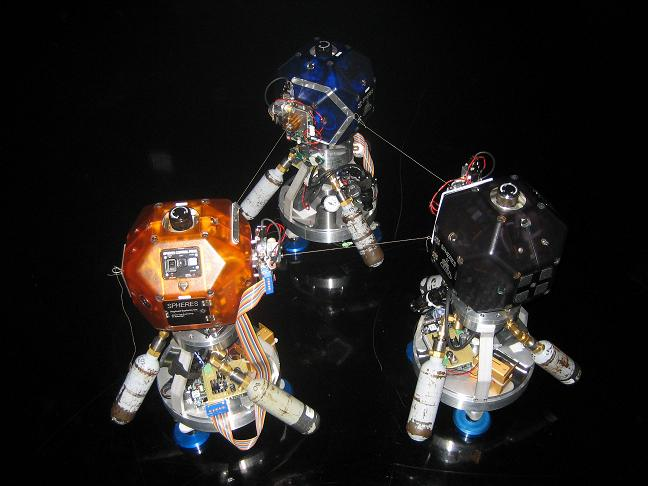
Tethered SPHERES nano-satellites developed by the MIT

Tethered SPHERES nano-satellites developed by the MIT

Spacecraft formation flight is becoming a key research area, where distributed computation and decentralized control schemes, as well as information flows between elements, are explored. One such example includes stellar interferometers in which multiple apertures, in controlled formation, collect the light for coherent interferometric beam combinations, thereby achieving a fine angular resolution comparable to a large monolithic aperture telescope. The possible architectures of spaceborne interferometers include a structurally connected interferometer (SCI) Space Interferometry Mission, which allows for very limited baseline changes, and a separated spacecraft interferometer (SSI) Terrestrial Planet Finder, where the usage of propellant can be prohibitively expensive. A tethered-formation flight interferometer represents a balance between SCI and SSI. Such a system is currently being considered for NASA's Submillimeter Probe of the Evolution of Cosmic Structure (SPECS) mission. The dynamics of SSI are coupled by the definition of relative attitude whereas tethered formation spacecraft exhibit inherently coupled nonlinear dynamics.

The MIT Space Systems Laboratory conducted ground experiments that tested a fully decentralized nonlinear control law, which eliminates the need for inter-satellite communications. Contraction theory was used to prove that a nonlinear control law stabilizing a single-tethered spacecraft can also stabilize arbitrarily large circular arrays of tethered spacecraft, as well as a three-spacecraft inline configuration. In order to validate the effectiveness of the decentralized control and estimation framework, a new suite of hardware has been designed and added to the SPHERES (Synchronize Position Hold Engage and Reorient Experimental Satellite) testbed. A 2007 PhD thesis introduced a novel relative attitude estimator, in which a series of Kalman filters incorporate the gyro, force-torque sensor, and relative distance measurements. The closed-loop control experiments can be viewed at. The MIT team also reported the first propellant-free underactuated control results for tethered formation flight. This is motivated by a controllability analysis that indicates that both array resizing and spin-up are fully controllable by the reaction wheels and the tether motor.
