= SkyCube (satellite) =

Crowdfunded satellite project

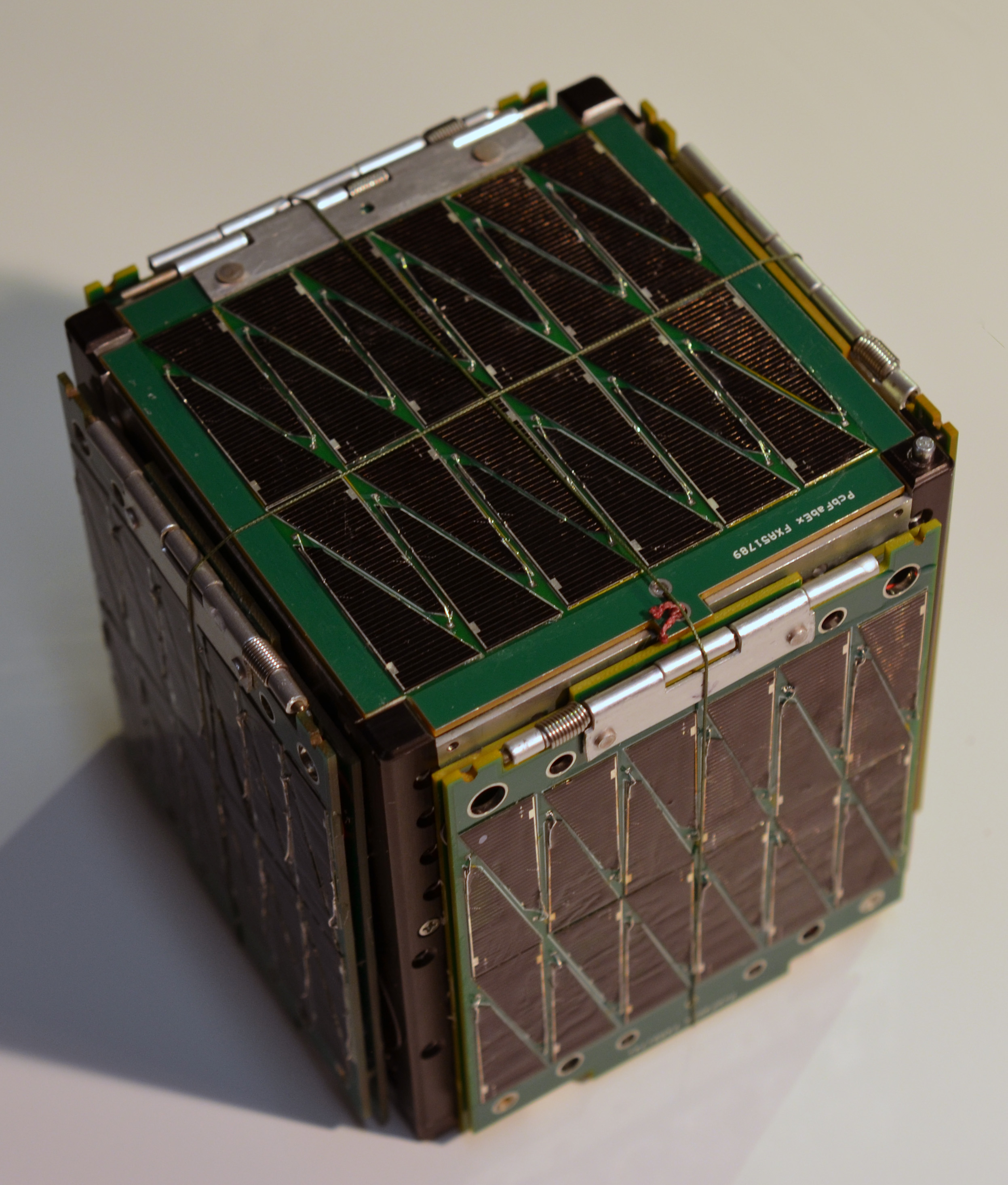
- SkyCube in undeployed state
- Mission type: Earth imaging
- Operator: Southern Stars
- COSPAR ID: 1998-067EN
- SATCAT no.: 39569
- Mission duration: 60–90 days (planned)

Spacecraft properties
- Spacecraft type: 1U CubeSat
- Manufacturer: Nanoracks
- Launch mass: 1.3 kg (2.9 lb)

Start of mission
- Launch date: 9 January 2014, 18:07:05 UTC
- Rocket: Antares 120
- Launch site: MARS, LP-0A
- Contractor: Orbital Sciences
- Deployed from: International Space Station
- Deployment date: 28 February 2014

End of mission
- Last contact: 27 March 2014
- Decay date: 9 November 2014

Orbital parameters
- Reference system: Geocentric orbit
- Regime: Low Earth orbit
- Perigee altitude: 408 km (254 mi)
- Apogee altitude: 414 km (257 mi)
- Inclination: 51.65°
- Period: 92.79 minutes

SkyCube was an American crowdsourced CubeSat. It was first announced on Kickstarter on 14 July 2012 and successfully funded on 12 September 2012, meeting its US$82,500 goal with a total of US$116,890. It was developed and built in 2012–2013, completed flight integration at Nanoracks in late 2013, and launched aboard the Cygnus CRS Orb-1 flight at the Mid-Atlantic Regional Spaceport on Wallops Island, Virginia on 9 January 2014. SkyCube was deployed from the International Space Station on 28 February 2014. Contact with the satellite was last made on 27 March 2014. SkyCube re-entered the Earth's atmosphere on 9 November 2014. It is one of several crowdfunded satellites launched during the 2010s.

== Mission ==
SkyCube had three major mission components: the broadcast of messages from its radio, the capture of pictures from space via its three cameras, and the deployment of a large balloon.

=== Messages ===
The SkyCube radio emitted periodic beaconing pings which contained 120-byte messages from the Kickstarter backers. These pings were transmitted at 915 MHz, using the AX.25 protocol at 9600 baud with BPSK modulation, with a callsign of WG9XMF.

=== Imaging ===
Using its three cameras, SkyCube intended to take pictures of the Earth from orbit. The cameras were VGA resolution and had lenses with three different fields of view (120°, 35°, and 6°), giving a variety of imaging possibilities. The images would have been transmitted back to Earth at 57.6 kbit/s. Kickstarter backers chose when the pictures were taken. National Oceanic and Atmospheric Administration (NOAA) granted a 90-day imaging license to SkyCube on 1 February 2013.

=== Balloon ===
SkyCube would have deployed a large (2 m (6 ft 7 in)) balloon at the end of its mission. The balloon was coated with reflective titanium dioxide and made it visible from the ground. The balloon increased the atmospheric drag on SkyCube, and within two weeks the orbit would have decayed enough for SkyCube to enter Earth's atmosphere and burn up safely. The inflation was intended to be triggered via 4-gram CO_{2} canister.

=== Mission failure ===
Several attempts were made to establish connection with the satellite, following its deployment. Initial attempts failed, but eventually basic telemetry was received, which indicated that at least one solar panel failed to deploy. However, subsequent communication attempts were made to send commands to the satellite, but none created a response. The fact that the satellite's orbit did not decay as quickly as those other CubeSats launched indicates that it experienced less drag, which also supports the conclusion that there was not a sufficient solar panel deployment.

== Technical specifications ==
Dimensions	10 × 10 × 11.3 cm CubeSat standard
Interface specification	ISIPOD 1.4I
Mass	1.3 kg (2.9 lb)
Expected lifetime	60 – 90 days
Attitude control system	Passive magnotorquers
Power	9 total panels: one roof panel and 8 deployable panels. Each panel consists of 24 Spectrolab triangular cells wired in series-parallel for a nominal 12 V.
Batteries	2 x Li-ion 18650 cells, 8.4 V 2300 mAh, Molicell ICR18650J.
Power bus	3.3 V, 5 V regulated. Constant-current driver for solar panel deployment (Nichrome burn wires).
Primary downlink	915 MHz, AX.25 protocol, BPSK modulation, 57.6 kbit/s
Telemetry/messaging downlink	915 MHz, AX.25 protocol, BPSK modulation, 9.6 kbit/s
Command uplink	450 MHz, AX.25 protocol, FSK modulation, 9.6 kbit/s

== Partnerships ==
SkyCube relied on several partners to provide necessary services:

Organization	Function
Naval Postgraduate School	Ground station services in North America and Hawaii
Saber Astronautics	Ground station and Mission Control services in Australia
Orbital Sciences	Launch provider
Nanoracks	Integrator
Astronautical Development, LLC	Radios and structural components

== See also ==
- List of CubeSats
