= Sunchon Airport =

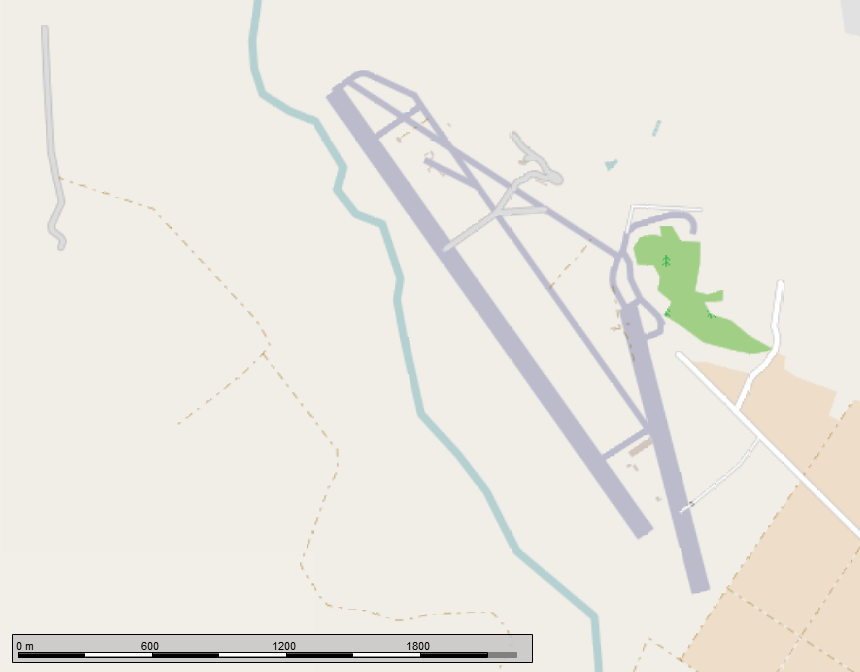
- IATA: none; ICAO: ZKSC

Summary
- Airport type: Military
- Serves: Sunchon, North Korea
- Elevation AMSL: 138 ft / 42 m
- Coordinates: 39°24′43.50″N 125°53′25.70″E

Map
- Location of airport in North Korea Sunchon (Asia) Sunchon (North Pacific ) Sunchon (Earth)

Runways
| Direction | Length | | Surface |
| Direction | ft | m | Surface |
|---|---|---|---|
| 15/33 | 8,150 | 2,484 | Concrete |

Sunchon Airport (순천비행장) is an airport in Pyongan-namdo, North Korea. It is 28mi or 45km northwest of Pyongyang, the capital of North Korea.

== Facilities ==
The airfield has a single concrete runway 15/33 that used to measure 8150 x 157 feet (2484 x 48 m). According to another source, it was recently expanded to 9186ft in length (2800m), with a possible extra 1300ft (~400m) extension being cleared. It has a full-length parallel taxiway with two aprons at the ends. One taxiway leads to possible underground storage. It is home to the 55th fighter regiment of Mikoyan-Gurevich MiG-29 and a ground attack regiment of Sukhoi Su-7 and Sukhoi Su-25 jets.
