= UAPSat-1 =

Peruvian student Cubesat

- Mission type: Technology
- Operator: UAP
- COSPAR ID: 1998-067EK
- SATCAT no.: 39566

Spacecraft properties
- Spacecraft type: 1U CubeSat
- Launch mass: 1 kilogram (2.2 lb)

Start of mission
- Launch date: January 9, 2014, 18:07:05 UTC
- Rocket: Antares 120
- Launch site: MARS LP-0B
- Contractor: Orbital Sciences

End of mission
- Decay date: 22 May 2014

Orbital parameters
- Reference system: Geocentric
- Regime: Low Earth

UAPSat-1 was a satellite situated in the earth orbit created and operated by students and staff at Universidad Alas Peruanas. It was launched on an Orbital Sciences Corporation Antares rocket alongside Cygnus CRS Orb-1. Orbital decay occurred on July 1, 2014.
