= TSUBAME (satellite) =

Microsatellite developed in Tokyo, Japan

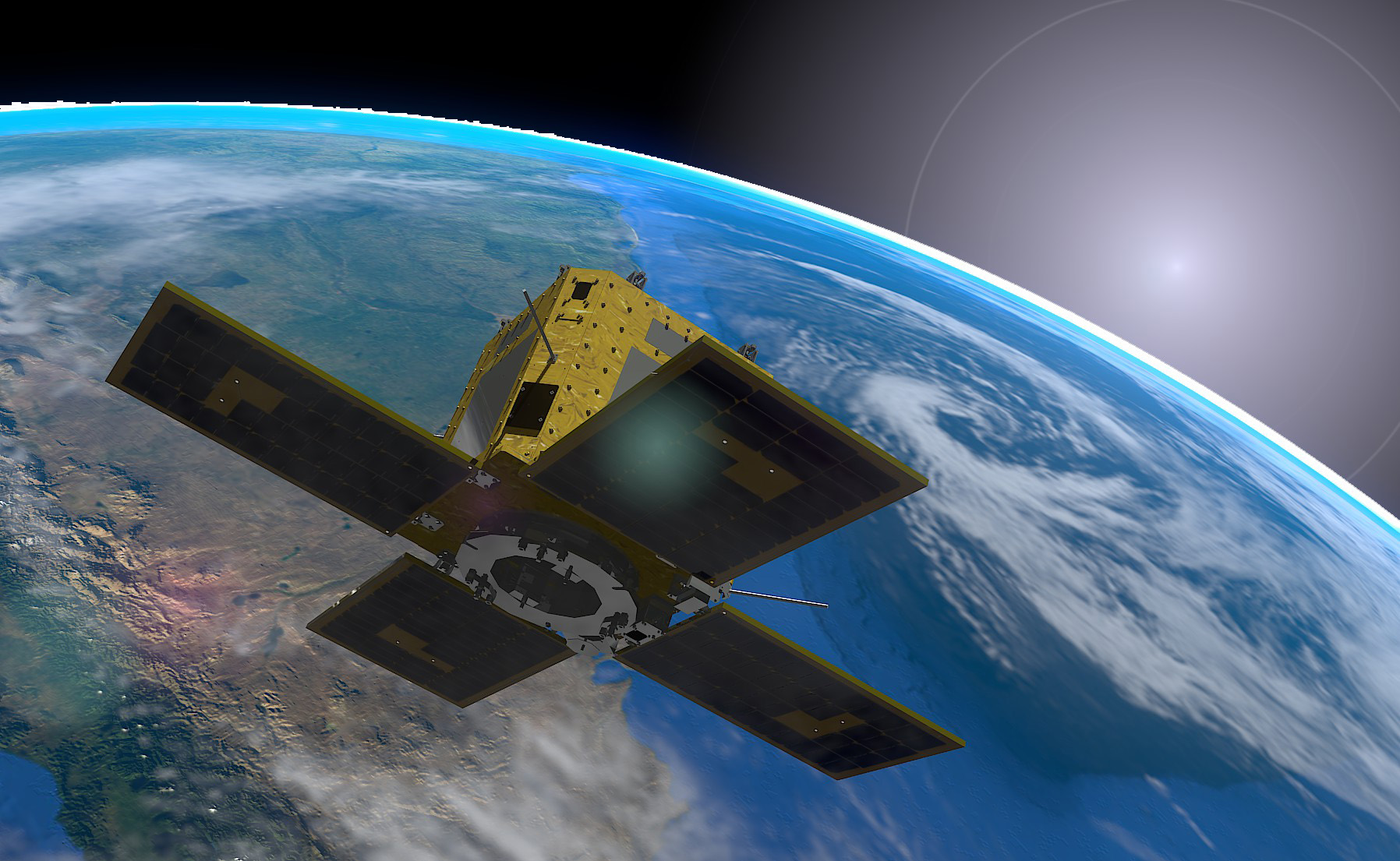
CG rendering of the TSUBAME satellite

TSUBAME was a microsatellite developed by the Tokyo Institute of Technology and Tokyo University of Science from a student design concept in 2004. The satellite was designed to demonstrate new technologies for rapid attitude control, observing gamma ray bursts, and Earth observation. The name, TSUBAME, means swift in Japanese and was chosen both because of the experimental attitude control system and to invoke another gamma ray observatory, the Swift Gamma-Ray Burst Mission, which launched shortly after TSUBAME's first design concept was published in 2004.

TSUBAME was launched with four other satellites from Yasny Cosmodrome on a Dnepr rocket on November 6, 2014. It was placed in a 500 km altitude Sun-synchronous orbit. A week after the launch, problems were reported with communication hardware and communication was lost with the satellite after three months of recovery efforts.

== Objectives ==
The TSUBAME mission included both engineering and scientific objectives. Primarily engineering objectives were successful demonstration of new compact control moment gyroscopes for rapid changes in spacecraft attitude and demonstration of a compact, 14-meter resolution optical camera. In addition to these engineering objectives, the mission also included a primarily scientific objective to observe ephemeral, high-energy phenomena, such as gamma ray bursts, using polarimetry of hard X-rays. Early concepts of the mission also included tether formation control experiments but this objective appears to have been dropped from the final design.

== History ==
The Matunaga space systems lab at the Tokyo Institute of Technology had launched several student-designed satellites before TSUBAME, including CUTE-1 in 2003, CUTE-1.7 + APD in 2006, and CUTE-1.7 + APD II in 2007. The first design concepts for the TSUBAME mission were entered into a student satellite design contest in 2004, where it won Grand Prix. TSUBAME was one of four small satellites to launch piggyback with ASNARO 1. The mission was launched from Yasny Cosmodrome on a Dnepr rocket on November 6, 2014. It was deployed into a 500 km Sun synchronous orbit.

Initially, TSUBAME's mission was expected to last one year. Early results from the check-in phase, where hardware is activated and vital functions checked, were positive, but a week after launch issues with RF command receiver (in the FM broadcast band) were observed. Later, issues developed with the satellite spin rate, S-band communications, GPS receiver, and battery voltage and temperature. About three months after launch, all communication was lost with the failure of the continuous wave transceiver. Subsequent analysis of communications with the satellite and laboratory reproduction have revealed that the ultimate loss of contact and some of the other issues were caused by a failure in a DC-DC converter. Several other issues and design flaws were revealed in the failure analysis.

== Description ==
The satellite bus was a rectangular prism 45 cm × 45 cm × 56 cm (1.48 ft × 1.48 ft × 1.84 ft) assembled from an internal structure of metal panels an exterior covered with carbon fibre reinforced polymer lattice. The spacecraft mass was approximately 49 kg (108 lb).

The miniature control moment gyroscopes demonstrated in TSUBAME each had a rotating flywheel driven by a synchronous motor, and a single stepper motor, which controlled the gimbal. These control moment gyros were arranged in a pyramid. The flywheels were 7.35 cm in diameter and weighed 1 kg. In addition to the control moment gyros, a magnetorquer was also used for attitude control. Navigation and attitude determination used a number of sensors including six Sun sensors, a three-direction magnetometer, three MEMS gyroscopes, and two star trackers. A field-programmable gate array contained the software for the attitude determination and control systems.

TSUBAME had multiple communication systems to cope with the limitations of the radio equipment available on the ground. Similar to other satellites developed by the space systems laboratory at Tokyo Institute of Technology, TSUBAME had an FM band receiver and ultra high frequency transmitter which could communicate with the university's ground station. The UHF transmitter broadcast continuously after deployment so that amateur radio operators could assist in tracking the satellite. The volume of data that TSUBAME was expected to produce (on the order of tens of megabytes) could not be quickly broadcast by the radio transmitter, so an additional S-band transceiver was also included, even though an S-band antenna was not immediately available to the university; it was hoped that Fukui University of Technology would allow use of a 10m parabolic antenna after the launch. Poor design of the antennas on TSUBAME were found to be a likely cause of many of the failures that occurred on orbit. The first communication issues that were observed were attributed to interference from radio waves reflected off the solar panels. Subsequent failures were attributed to a failure of a DC-DC converter powering the communication systems.

=== Instruments ===
The primary science objective measuring polarization of gamma ray bursts required two instruments. The Wide-Field Burst Monitors (WBMs) were used to help detect and localize events so the spacecraft can be pointed in the correct direction, while the Hard X-ray Compton Polarimeter (HXCP) was designed to make observations once correctly oriented. There were five WBM units at diverse locations on the TSUBAME. Each WBM was a tile of caesium iodide scintillator. When an increase in the count rate was detected by one or more scintillators, the main processor would determine the direction, initiate control systems of the satellite. The HXCP could measure polarization for photons from 30 to 200 keV. It comprised tiles of plastic scintillator to scatter incident photons, photomultiplier tubes, and a second caesium iodide based scintillator used as an absorber. Each scintillator tile was attached to an avalanche photodiode, which converts photons to an electric signal. To mitigate background noise, the HXCP was surrounded by metal composite shielding, and coincidence between the two scintillating materials could be compared and processed by onboard computers. The optical camera was developed by the Tokyo University of Science. It had a ground resolution of 14 meters per pixel and could take up to five images each second.
