= Chasqui I =

Nanosatellite, first to be hand-deployed

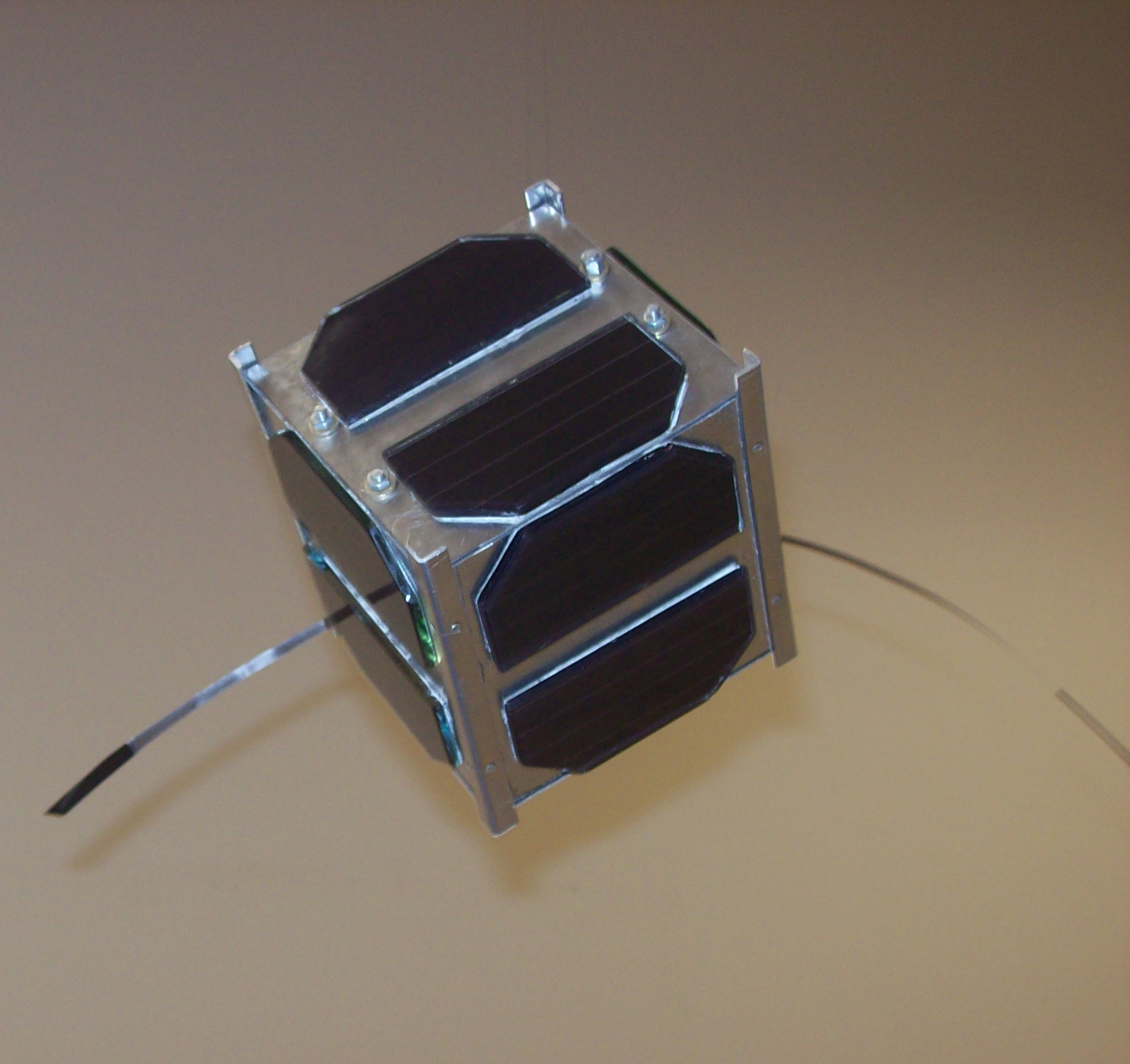
- Chasqui I
- Mission type: Scientific
- Operator: National University of Engineering
- COSPAR ID: 1998-067ET
- SATCAT no.: 40117
- Website: www.chasqui.uni.edu.pe

Spacecraft properties
- Bus: 1U CubeSat
- Launch mass: 1 kilogram (2.2 lb)

Start of mission
- Launch date: August 18, 2014

Orbital parameters
- Reference system: Geocentric
- Regime: Low Earth

Chasqui I is a one-kilogram nanosatellite developed by students at Peru's National University of Engineering (UNI) based on CubeSat technology. Developed with assistance from the Russian Southwest State University (SWSU), Kursk, it was part of an educational project to acquire the experience and ability in developing satellites.

The nanosatellite was launched from the International Space Station during a spacewalk on August 18, 2014. The concept satellite was equipped with two cameras—one for visible light and one for infrared—to take photos of Earth.

The name of the project refers to the chasqui, who served as messengers in the Inca Empire.

== General objectives ==
Most of UNI's objectives in satellite technology were completed through the CubeSat nanosatellites. Plans for Chasqui I included taking pictures of the Earth, with transmission to a ground station.

Specific objectives of the project were to (1) establish contact and support other universities and institutions involved in such projects; (2) deepen the knowledge in emerging information and communications technologies; (3) lead projects within Latin America; and (4) demonstrate and validate new technologies.

The stated goals of the project were:

- Design of the project profile
- Funding
- Capacity building
- Implementation of the laboratory
- Development of the project
- Testing integration
- Guidelines
- Operation

== Project ==
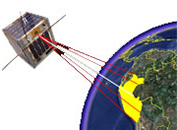
Chasqui I in space

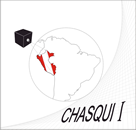
Chasqui I logo

Chasqui I is a student research project nanosatellite, weighing less than 1 kg and having a volume of up to 1 Lt. It was designed to image Peruvian land using a CMOS camera that seeks to distinguish between fertile land and uncultivated areas. As a student project, Chasqui I was constructed using commercial components. It uses amateur radio frequency, making it possible to be located throughout the country. The Chasqui I students also developed a ground station that allows for remote monitoring of the satellite, as well as satellites of other universities.

Peru has large geographical diversity, which makes it very difficult to constantly monitor the situation of natural and man-made events, such as permanent snow melting, deforestation of the Amazon, the protection of habitats of endangered species, combating narco-terrorism, surveillance of borders and territorial sea, and the prediction and mitigation of natural disasters. UNI, with its project Chasqui I, are taking steps in the process of addressing problems such as crop monitoring and telecommunications areas.

== Project modules ==
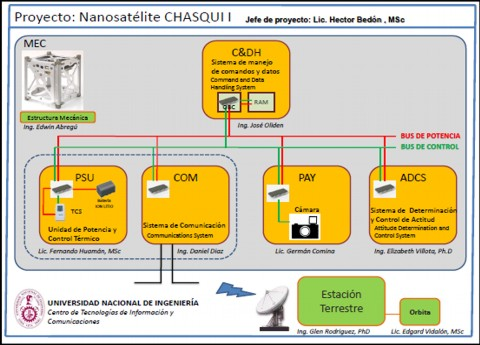
Outline of the project development modules

=== Mechanical Structure – EMEC ===
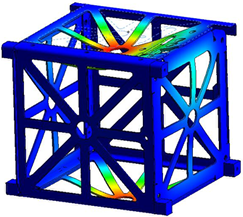
Simulation of displacements in the satellite's internal frame

The mechanical structure (EMEC) module was responsible for reviewing the state of field, comparing existing nanosatellite designs, and manufacturing the satellite based on the standard CubeSat format.

=== Central Control and Information Management – CCIM ===
This subsystem manages and monitors information from all subsystems of Chasqui I. It contains a processor called the on-board computer (OBC), which fulfills the computing functions of all other subsystems.

=== Power and Thermal Control – PCT ===
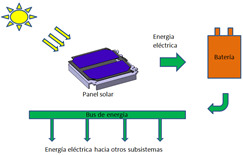
Energy cycle of Chasqui I

The Power subsystem is responsible for receiving, processing, storing, and distributing power to other subsystems in the satellite. The objective of this subsystem is to ensure the necessary supply of electricity.

The Thermal Control subsystem is responsible for maintaining the proper temperature of the satellite components. The most critical task of this subsystem is to maintain the batteries within their operating limits of 0 °C–20 °C.

These subsystems also manage and monitor the state of the satellite, such as temperature, voltage and current. Both subsystems, including the heaters, were designed and built at UNI.

=== Communication System – SICOM ===
This subsystem is responsible for providing a means of communication between the satellite and the ground station.

=== Image Acquisition System – SIMA ===
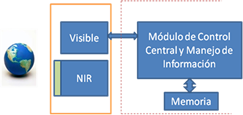
Block diagram of SIMA

This subsystem obtains photographs of the Earth using two cameras: one in the visible and the other in the near-infrared. Digital information is collected by the CCIM and then sent to the ground station (ESTER). Additionally, the module is responsible for processing digital images obtained.

=== System Identification and Attitude Control – SDCA ===
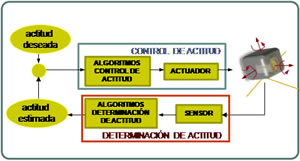
Block diagram of SDCA

This subsystem maintains the nanosatellite's stabilization and orientation, adjusting the orientation when necessary. Specifically, the module

- stabilizes the nanosatellite after leaving the deployer through reduction (within 0.1rad / s) and control of angular velocities;
- maintains a pointing accuracy of 3° for taking pictures of Peru and, if technically possible, having a wide coverage of South America through maneuvers of 30° roll and 30° pitch;
- maintains a less demanding pointing accuracy (e.g. 20°) to enable data exchange between the satellite and ground station.

The SDCA enables Chasqui I to determine its attitude, calculate the correction required to achieve the desired orientation, and execute the necessary maneuvers using the actuators. The attitude determination system uses magnetometers, Sun sensors, and attitude determination algorithms for estimating positions and angular velocities. Using GPS and gyroscopes as sensors for determining attitude was also evaluated. The attitude control system uses electromagnetic coils and permanent magnets as actuators, forming what are known as magnetorquers. The magnetorquers are especially important for the stabilization of the nanosatellite once it leaves the deployer. The inclusion of the permanent magnet creates a system of active-passive control. The use of magnetic materials and magnetic hysteresis were also evaluated.

=== Ground Station – ESTER ===
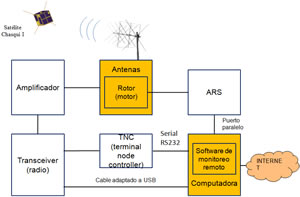
Block diagram of ESTER

This ground-based subsystem consists of the facilities and wireless communication (radio) needed to communicate with the Chasqui I (and any other satellite). Its main functions are:

- Follow-up: radio for or hear the beacon or satellite for its position
- Telemetry: request state variables (such as temperature or voltage) to monitor and validate the satellite orbit calculation
- Commando: order to extend the satellite antenna, reset the system, or take and send photos

=== System Orbits – SORS ===
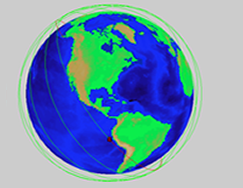
Chasqui I trajectory and orbit

This module aims to simulate the trajectory and orbit of Chasqui I, which is calculated solving differential equations of motion in parallel using two programs: DelPhi and MATLAB.

This simulation is performed by considering three phases:

1. Obtain nonlinear equations of motion by considering the Earth as an inertial reference system, the quadrupole term of the gravitational potential, and using Newton's second law
2. Solve the equations of motion (energy remaining constant) using a Runge-Kutta method of order 4
3. Perform trajectory simulations using MATLAB

=== Module Integration and Testing – MIP ===
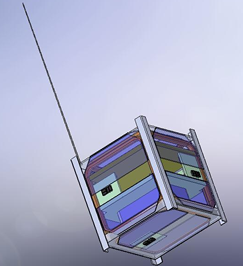
MIP rendering of the subsystems of Chasqui I

This module was responsible for the assembly of all the satellite components such as circuit boards, cameras, batteries, antennas, sensors, and magnetorquers. Subsequent goals included optimizing surfaces, volumes, masses; finding the center of mass; planning and conducting standardized testing requirements; and performing field tests.

== See also ==
- List of CubeSats
