= Raijin-2 =

Japanese micro-satellite

- Names: Rising-2; SpriteSat
- Mission type: Earth observation
- Operator: Tohoku University
- COSPAR ID: 2014-029D
- SATCAT no.: 39769
- Website: At tohoku.ac.jp
- Mission duration: 11 years, 5 months and 21 days (ongoing)

Spacecraft properties
- Launch mass: 42 kg (93 lb)

Start of mission
- Launch date: 03:05, May 24, 2014 (UTC)
- Rocket: H-IIA 202
- Launch site: Tanegashima Space Center

Orbital parameters
- Reference system: Geocentric
- Eccentricity: 0.0013
- Perigee altitude: 629.8 km (391.3 mi)
- Apogee altitude: 647.4 km (402.3 mi)
- Inclination: 97.9°
- Period: 97.5 min

Raijin-2 (Rising-2) is a Japanese micro-satellite launched in 2014. The satellite is built around a 10 cm diameter, 1m focal length Cassegrain telescope and features the following instruments:

- HPT - main telescope with 5m resolution at nadir, operating in visible and near-infrared bands
- BOL - bolometer array camera for cloud temperature measurement
- WFC - wide field-of-view CCD camera
- LSI-N and LSI-W - 2 CMOS medium field-of-view cameras for near-infrared imaging
- VLF-ANT, R - radio antenna to receive signatures of lighting events

All instruments are powered by GaAs solar cells mounted on the spacecraft body, with estimated electrical power of 47.6W. The spacecraft features an unusual central-pillar bus, inherited from the Sprite-Sat satellite. The attitude control is done by means of reaction wheels and magneto-torquers, and qualified for 0.1 degrees angular accuracy.

== Launch ==
RISING-2 was launched from Tanegashima, Japan, on 24 May 2014 by a H-IIA rocket.

== Mission ==
The satellite is intended for atmosphere research, especially for gathering statistics on cloud formation and the occurrence of sprites in the upper atmosphere. Mission data are down-linked in S-band with maximal data rate of 38.4 kbit/s.

== See also ==
- 2014 in spaceflight
- RAIKO (satellite)
