= 2003 in spaceflight =

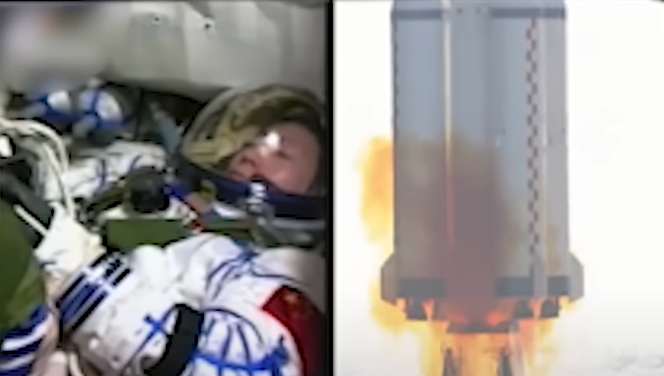
- Launch of Shenzhou 5, the first Chinese human spaceflight mission, this mission has made China the 3rd country to have independent human spaceflight capability after the USSR and the US.

Orbital launches
- First: 11 January
- Last: 29 December
- Total: 63
- Successes: 60
- Failures: 3
- Partial failures: 0
- Catalogued: 61

National firsts
- Satellite: Greece; Nigeria
- Space traveller: China; Israel

Rockets
- Maiden flights: Atlas V 521; Delta II Heavy; Delta IV Medium; Strela
- Retirements: Ariane 4 44L; Ariane 5G; Space Shuttle Columbia; Titan 23G

Crewed flights
- Orbital: 4
- Total travellers: 13

2003 in spaceflight

This article outlines notable events occurring in 2003 in spaceflight, including major launches and EVAs.

== Space Shuttle Columbia disaster ==
On February 1, 2003, Space Shuttle Columbia disintegrated as it re-entered the atmosphere over Texas and Louisiana, killing all seven astronauts on board. It was the second of two Space Shuttle missions to end in disaster, after the loss of Challenger and crew in 1986.

Final Columbia mission
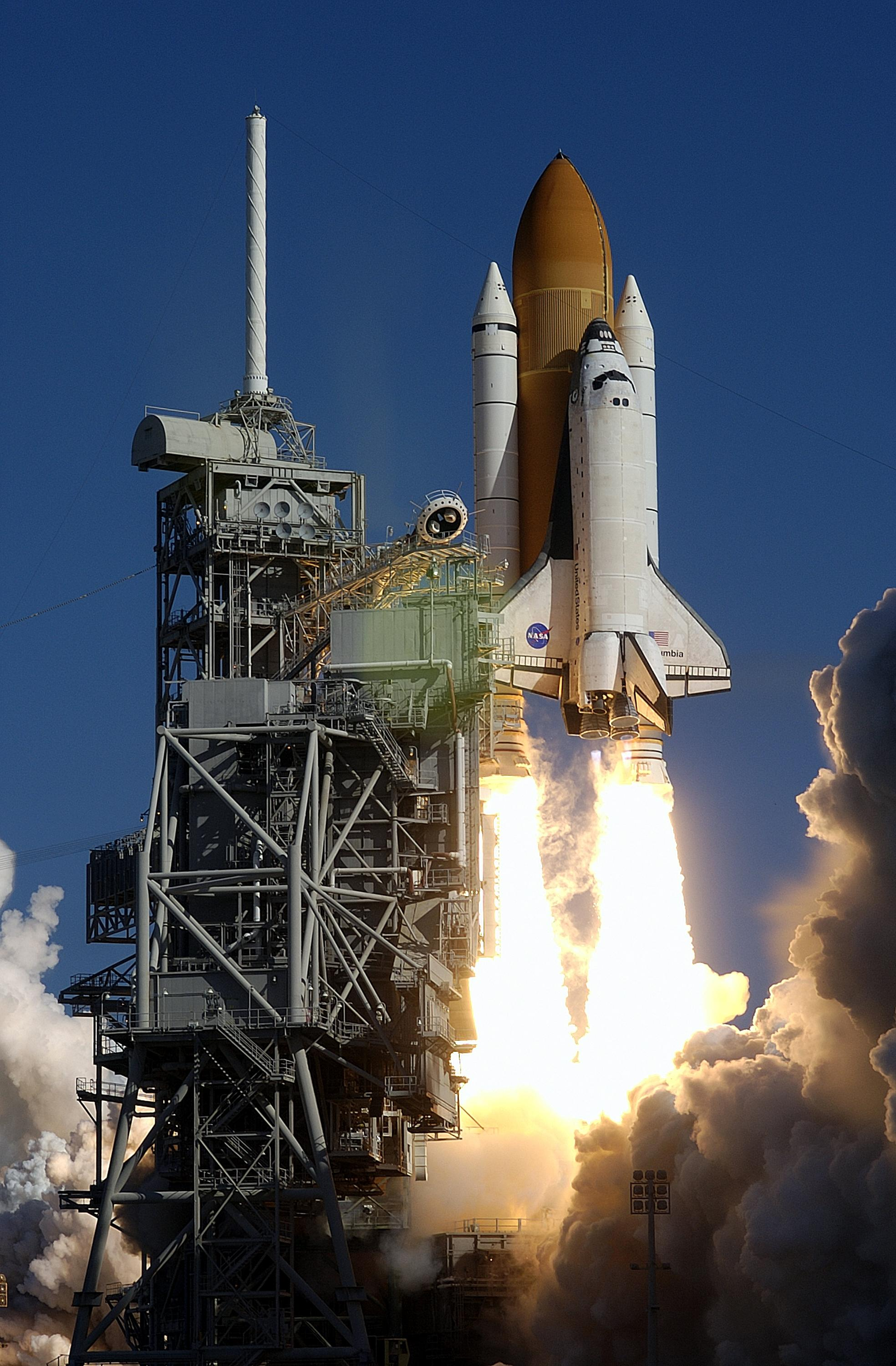
Space Shuttle Columbia launches on its last mission, STS-107.

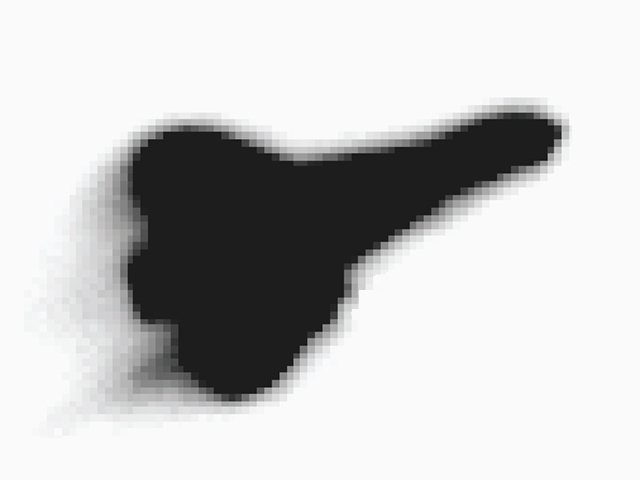
Columbia at approximately 13:57 UTC on 1 February. Debris is starting to come off from the left wing.

== First human spaceflight mission from China ==
Shenzhou 5 (Chinese: 神舟五号; pinyin: Shénzhōu Wǔ Hào, see § Etymology) was the first human spaceflight mission of the Chinese space program, launched on 15 October 2003. The Shenzhou spacecraft was launched on a Long March 2F launch vehicle. There had been four previous flights of uncrewed Shenzhou missions since 1999. China became the third country in the world to have independent human spaceflight capability after the Soviet Union/Russia and the United States. As of November 2026, this mission marks the last recent time an astronaut was launched alone to conduct an entirely solo orbital mission.

== Orbital launches ==
- ← Jan
- Feb
- Mar
- Apr
- May
- Jun
- Jul
- Aug
- Sep
- Oct
- Nov
- Dec →

| Date and time (UTC) | Rocket | Flight number | Launch site | | LSP | |
| Date and time (UTC) | Payload (⚀ = CubeSat) | Operator | Orbit | Function | Decay (UTC) | Outcome |
| Date and time (UTC) | Remarks | | | | | |
|---|---|---|---|---|---|---|
=== January ===
| 6 January; 14:19 | (United States) Titan 23G | | (United States) Vandenberg SLC-4W | | (United States) Lockheed Martin | |
| 6 January; 14:19 | (United States) Coriolis | US Air Force | Low Earth | Technology development | In orbit | Operational |
| 13 January; 00:45 | (United States) Delta II 7320-10C | | (United States) Vandenberg SLC-2W | | (United States) Boeing IDS | |
| 13 January; 00:45 | (United States) ICESat | NASA | Low Earth | Oceanography | 30 August 2010; 09:00 | Partial spacecraft failure |
| 13 January; 00:45 | (United States) CHIPSat | NASA | Low Earth | Astrophysics | In orbit | Operational |
| 13 January; 00:45 | Laser reliability issues limited ICESat operations. ICESat deactivated in February 2010 following failure of last laser in October 2009. | | | | | |
| 16 January; 20:39 | (United States) Space Shuttle Columbia | | (United States) Kennedy Space Center LC-39A | | (United States) United Space Alliance | |
| 16 January; 20:39 | (United States) STS-107 | NASA | Low Earth | Research | 1 February; 13:59 | Failure |
| 16 January; 20:39 | (United States) Spacehab-RDM | NASA | Low Earth (Columbia) | Microgravity and Earth science research | 1 February; 13:59 | Failure |
| 16 January; 20:39 | (United States) EDO Pallet | NASA | Low Earth (Columbia) | Cryogenic mission duration extension pallet | 1 February; 13:59 | Failure |
| 16 January; 20:39 | Crewed orbital flight with 7 astronauts, including the first Israeli space traveler Final flight of Space Shuttle Columbia, disintegrated during re-entry resulting in loss of crew and vehicle. | | | | | |
| 25 January; 20:13 | (United States) Pegasus-XL | | (United States) Stargazer, Cape Canaveral | | (United States) Orbital Sciences | |
| 25 January; 20:13 | (United States) SORCE | NASA | Low Earth | investigate total solar irradiance | In orbit | Operational |
| 29 January; 18:06 | (United States) Delta II 7925-9.5 | | (United States) Cape Canaveral SLC-17B | | (United States) Boeing IDS | |
| 29 January; 18:06 | (United States) GPS IIR-8 (USA-166) | US Air Force | Medium Earth | Navigation | In orbit | Operational |
| 29 January; 18:06 | (United States) XSS-10 | US Air Force | Low Earth | Technology demonstration | In orbit | Successful |
| 29 January; 18:06 | XSS-10 deactivated 30 January 2003 | | | | | |
=== February ===
| 2 February; 12:59 | (Russia) Soyuz-U | | (Kazakhstan) Baikonur Site 1/5 | | (Russia) Roskosmos | |
| 2 February; 12:59 | (Russia) Progress M-47 | Roskosmos | Low Earth (ISS) | Logistics | 27 August | Successful |
| 2 February; 12:59 | ISS flight 10P | | | | | |
| 15 February; 07:00 | (France) Ariane 4 44L | | (France) Kourou ELA-2 | | (France) Arianespace | |
| 15 February; 07:00 | (United Nations) Intelsat 907 | Intelsat | Geosynchronous | Communications | In orbit | Operational |
| 15 February; 07:00 | Final flight of Ariane 4 44L | | | | | |
=== March ===
| 11 March; 00:59 | (United States) Delta IV Medium | | (United States) Cape Canaveral SLC-37B | | (United States) Boeing IDS | |
| 11 March; 00:59 | (United States) DSCS III A-3 (USA-167) | US Air Force | Geosynchronous | Communications | In orbit | Operational |
| 11 March; 00:59 | Maiden flight of Delta IV Medium | | | | | |
| 28 March; 01:27 | (Japan) H-IIA 2024 | | (Japan) Tanegashima LA-Y1 | | (Japan) | |
| 28 March; 01:27 | (Japan) IGS-1A | Japanese Government | Low Earth | Reconnaissance | 18 July 2014 | Successful |
| 28 March; 01:27 | (Japan) IGS-1B | Japanese Government | Low Earth | Reconnaissance | 26 July 2012 | Partial spacecraft failure |
| 28 March; 01:27 | IGS-1B lost power in 2007, and concluded operations after just over half of its design life | | | | | |
| 31 March; 22:09 | (United States) Delta II 7925-9.5 | | (United States) Cape Canaveral SLC-17A | | (United States) Boeing IDS | |
| 31 March; 22:09 | (United States) GPS IIR-9 (USA-168) | US Air Force | Medium Earth | Navigation | In orbit | Operational |
=== April ===
| 2 April; 01:53 | (Russia) Molniya-M | | (Russia) Plesetsk Site 16/2 | | (Russia) VKS | |
| 2 April; 01:53 | (Russia) Molniya 1-92 | VKS | Molniya | Communications | In orbit | Operational |
| 8 April; 14:43 | (United States) Titan IVB (401)/Centaur | | (United States) Cape Canaveral SLC-40 | | (United States) Lockheed Martin | |
| 8 April; 14:43 | (United States) Milstar 6 (USA-169) | US Air Force | Geosynchronous | Communications | In orbit | Operational |
| 9 April; 22:52 | (France) Ariane 5G | | (France) Kourou ELA-3 | | (France) Arianespace | |
| 9 April; 22:52 | (India) INSAT 3A | ISRO | Geosynchronous | Communications | In orbit | Operational |
| 9 April; 22:52 | (United States) Galaxy 12 | PanAmSat | Geosynchronous | Communications | In orbit | Operational |
| 12 April; 00:47 | (United States) Atlas IIIB | | (United States) Cape Canaveral SLC-36B | | (Russia) (United States) International Launch Services | |
| 12 April; 00:47 | (China) AsiaSat 4 | AsiaSat | Geosynchronous | Communications | In orbit | Operational |
| 26 April; 03:53 | (Russia) Soyuz-FG | | (Kazakhstan) Baikonur Site 1/5 | | (Russia) Roskosmos | |
| 26 April; 03:53 | (Russia) Soyuz TMA-2 | Roskosmos | Low Earth (ISS) | ISS Expedition 7 | 28 October | Successful |
| 26 April; 03:53 | Crewed orbital flight with 2 cosmonauts | | | | | |
| 24 April; 04:23 | (Russia) Proton-K/DM-2 | | (Kazakhstan) Baikonur Site 81/24 | | (Russia) VKS | |
| 24 April; 04:23 | (Russia) Kosmos 2397 | VKS | Geosynchronous | Missile warning | In orbit | Operational |
| 28 April; 12:00 | (United States) Pegasus-XL | | (United States) Stargazer, Cape Canaveral | | (United States) Orbital Sciences | |
| 28 April; 12:00 | (United States) GALEX | NASA | Low Earth | Ultraviolet astronomy | In orbit | Operational |
=== May ===
| 8 May; 11:28 | (India) GSLV | | (India) Satish Dhawan FLP | | (India) ISRO | |
| 8 May; 11:28 | (India) GSAT-2 | ISRO | Geosynchronous | Communications | In orbit | Operational |
| 9 May; 04:29 | (Japan) M-V | | (Japan) Uchinoura | | (Japan) | |
| 9 May; 04:29 | (Japan) Hayabusa (MUSES-C) | ISAS | Heliocentric | Asteroid sample-return probe | 13 June 2010 | Partial spacecraft failure |
| 9 May; 04:29 | (Japan) MINERVA | ISAS | Heliocentric | Asteroid lander | In orbit | Spacecraft failure |
| 9 May; 04:29 | Explored asteroid 1998 SF36 | | | | | |
| 13 May; 22:10 | (United States) Atlas V 401 | | (United States) Cape Canaveral SLC-41 | | (Russia) (United States) International Launch Services | |
| 13 May; 22:10 | (Greece) HellasSat 2 | Hellas-Sat | Geosynchronous | Communications | In orbit | Operational |
| 13 May; 22:10 | First Greek satellite | | | | | |
| 24 May; 16:34 | (China) Long March 3A | | (China) Xichang | | (China) | |
| 24 May; 16:34 | (China) Beidou 2A | | Geosynchronous | Navigation | In orbit | Operational |
=== June ===
| 2 June; 17:45 | (Russia) Soyuz-FG/Fregat | | (Kazakhstan) Baikonur Site 31/6 | | (France) (Russia) Starsem | |
| 2 June; 17:45 | Mars Express | ESA | Areocentric | Mars probe | In orbit | Operational |
| 2 June; 17:45 | (United Kingdom) Beagle 2 | ESA | Heliocentric | Mars lander | 25 December 2003 | Spacecraft failure |
| 2 June; 17:45 | Maiden flight of Soyuz-FG/Fregat; Beagle 2 failed to contact Earth after landing on Mars | | | | | |
| 4 June; 19:23 | (Russia) Kosmos-3M | | (Russia) Plesetsk Site 132/1 | | (Russia) VKS | |
| 4 June; 19:23 | (Russia) Kosmos 2398 | MO RF | Low Earth | | In orbit | Operational |
| 6 June; 22:15 | (Russia) Proton-K/Briz-M | | (Kazakhstan) Baikonur Site 200/39 | | (Russia) (United States) International Launch Services | |
| 6 June; 22:15 | (United States) AMC-9 | SES Americom | Geosynchronous | Communications | In orbit | Operational |
| 8 June; 10:34 | (Russia) Soyuz-U | | (Kazakhstan) Baikonur Site 1/5 | | (Russia) Roskosmos | |
| 8 June; 10:34 | (Russia) Progress M1-10 | Roskosmos | Low Earth (ISS) | Logistics; Earth observation | 3 October | Successful |
| 8 June; 10:34 | ISS flight 11P | | | | | |
| 10 June; 13:55 | (Ukraine) Zenit-3SL | | (Norway) Ocean Odyssey | | (United Nations) Sea Launch | |
| 10 June; 13:55 | (United Arab Emirates) Thuraya 2 | Thuraya | Geosynchronous | Communications | In orbit | Operational |
| 10 June; 17:58 | (United States) Delta II 7925 | | (United States) Cape Canaveral SLC-17A | | (United States) Boeing IDS | |
| 10 June; 17:58 | (United States) Spirit (MER-A/MER-2) | NASA | Heliocentric | Mars rover | 4 January 2004 | Operational |
| 10 June; 17:58 | (United States) Spirit lander | NASA | Heliocentric | Mars lander | 4 January 2004 | Successful |
| 11 June; 22:38 | (France) Ariane 5G | | (France) Kourou ELA-3 | | (France) Arianespace | |
| 11 June; 22:38 | (Australia) Optus C1 | Optus/Australian Government | Geosynchronous | Communications | In orbit | Operational |
| 11 June; 22:38 | (Japan) BSAT-2C | BSAT | Geosynchronous | Communications | In orbit | Operational |
| 19 June; 20:00 | (Russia) Molniya-M | | (Russia) Plesetsk Site 43/3 | | (Russia) VKS | |
| 19 June; 20:00 | (Russia) Molniya 3-53 | VKS | Molniya | Communications | In orbit | Operational |
| 26 June; 18:55 | (United States) Pegasus-XL | | (United States) Stargazer, Vandenberg | | (United States) Orbital Sciences | |
| 26 June; 18:55 | (United States) Orbview 3 | Orbview | Low Earth | Imaging | 3 March 2011 | Satellite failure |
| 26 June; 18:55 | Ceased operations on 4 March 2007 after camera malfunction | | | | | |
| 30 June; 14:15 | (Russia) Rokot/Briz-KM | | (Russia) Plesetsk | | (France) (Russia) Eurockot | |
| 30 June; 14:15 | (Czech Republic) MIMOSA | | Low Earth | | 18 December 2011 | Successful |
| 30 June; 14:15 | DTUSat | | Low Earth | | In orbit | Operational |
| 30 June; 14:15 | (Canada) MOST | | Low Earth | Space telescope | In orbit | Operational |
| 30 June; 14:15 | Cute-I | | Low Earth | | In orbit | Operational |
| 30 June; 14:15 | (United States) QuakeSat | Stanford University | Low Earth | Earth observation | In orbit | Operational |
| 30 June; 14:15 | AAU-Cubesat | | Low Earth | | In orbit | Operational |
| 30 June; 14:15 | Can X-1 | | Low Earth | | In orbit | Operational |
| 30 June; 14:15 | Cubesat XI | | Low Earth | | In orbit | Operational |
| 30 June; 14:15 | Cubesat XII | | Low Earth | | In orbit | Operational |
| 30 June; 14:15 | Cubesat XIII | | Low Earth | | In orbit | Operational |
| 30 June; 14:15 | Cubesat XIV | | Low Earth | | In orbit | Operational |
| 30 June; 14:15 | (Russia) Monitor-E | | Low Earth | | In orbit | Operational |
=== July ===
| 8 July; 04:18 | (United States) Delta II 7925H | | (United States) Cape Canaveral SLC-17B | | (United States) Boeing IDS | |
| 8 July; 04:18 | (United States) Opportunity (MER-B/MER-1) | NASA | Heliocentric | Mars rover | In orbit | Operational |
| 8 July; 04:18 | (United States) Opportunity lander | NASA | Heliocentric | Mars lander | In orbit | Successful |
| 8 July; 04:18 | Maiden flight of Delta II Heavy | | | | | |
| 17 July; 23:45 | (United States) Atlas V 521 | | (United States) Cape Canaveral SLC-41 | | (Russia) (United States) International Launch Services | |
| 17 July; 23:45 | (United States) Rainbow-1 | Cablevision | Geosynchronous | Communications | In orbit | Operational |
| 17 July; 23:45 | Maiden flight of Atlas V 521 | | | | | |
=== August ===
| 8 August; 03:31 | (Ukraine) Zenit-3SL | | (Norway) Ocean Odyssey | | (United Nations) Sea Launch | |
| 8 August; 03:31 | (United States) Echostar 9 (Telstar 13) | EchoStar | Geosynchronous | Communications | In orbit | Operational |
| 12 August; 14:20 | (Russia) Soyuz-U | | (Kazakhstan) Baikonur Site 31/6 | | (Russia) VKS | |
| 12 August; 14:20 | (Russia) Kosmos 2399 | | Low Earth | Reconnaissance | 9 December | Failure |
| 12 August; 14:20 | Film capsule failed to deorbit | | | | | |
| 13 August; 02:09 | (United States) Pegasus-XL | | (United States) Stargazer, Vandenberg | | (United States) Orbital Sciences | |
| 13 August; 02:09 | (Canada) SCISAT-1 | CSA | Low Earth | Atmospheric research | In orbit | Operational |
| 19 August; 10:50 | (Russia) Kosmos-3M | | (Russia) Plesetsk Site 132/1 | | (Russia) VKS | |
| 19 August; 10:50 | (Russia) Kosmos 2400 (Strela 3) | | Low Earth | | In orbit | Operational |
| 19 August; 10:50 | (Russia) Kosmos 2401 (Strela 3) | | Low Earth | | In orbit | Operational |
| 22 August; 16:30 | (Brazil) VLS-1 | V03 | (Brazil) Alcântara | | (Brazil) Brazilian Space Agency | |
| 22 August; 16:30 | (Brazil) SATEC | INPE | Intended: Low Earth | Launch vehicle evaluation | Never left ground | Precluded |
| 22 August; 16:30 | (Brazil) UNOSAT | INPE | Intended: Low Earth | | Never left ground | Precluded |
| 22 August; 16:30 | Solid rocket booster ignition 3 days before the launch resulted in the catastrophic explosion, destroying the launch pad and killing 21 people. VLS-1 never had a new attempt and its development was extinguished in 2016. | | | | | |
| 25 August; 05:35 | (United States) Delta II 7920H | | (United States) Cape Canaveral SLC-17B | | (United States) Boeing IDS | |
| 25 August; 05:35 | (United States) Spitzer Space Telescope (SIRTF) | NASA | Heliocentric | Infrared astronomy | In orbit | Operational |
| 29 August; 01:47 | (Russia) Soyuz-U | | (Kazakhstan) Baikonur Site 1/5 | | (Russia) Roskosmos | |
| 29 August; 01:47 | (Russia) Progress M-48 | Roskosmos | Low Earth (ISS) | Logistics | 28 January 2004 | Successful |
| 29 August; 01:47 | ISS flight 12P | | | | | |
| 29 August; 23:13 | (United States) Delta IV Medium | | (United States) Cape Canaveral SLC-37B | | (United States) Boeing IDS | |
| 29 August; 23:13 | (United States) DSCS III B-6 (USA-170) | US Air Force | Geosynchronous | Communications | In orbit | Operational |
=== September ===
| 9 September; 04:29 | (United States) Titan IVB (401)/Centaur | | (United States) Cape Canaveral SLC-40 | | (United States) Lockheed Martin | |
| 9 September; 04:29 | (United States) USA-171 / Orion 5 | NRO | Geosynchronous | ELINT | In orbit | Operational |
| 9 September; 04:29 | NROL-26 mission. | | | | | |
| 16 September | (China) Kaituozhe-1 | | (China) Taiyuan | | (China) | |
| 16 September | (China) PS-2 | | Intended: Low Earth | Microsat | 16 September | Launch failure |
| 16 September | Fourth stage failed to ignite | | | | | |
| 27 September; 06:11 | (Russia) Kosmos-3M | | (Russia) Plesetsk Site 132/1 | | (Russia) VKS | |
| 27 September; 06:11 | (Russia) Mozhaets-4 | | Low Earth | | In orbit | Operational |
| 27 September; 06:11 | (Nigeria) NigeriaSat-1 | | Low Earth | | In orbit | Operational |
| 27 September; 06:11 | (United Kingdom) UK-DMC | | Low Earth | | In orbit | Operational |
| 27 September; 06:11 | (Turkey) BILSAT-1 | | Low Earth | | In orbit | Operational |
| 27 September; 06:11 | Larets | | Low Earth | | In orbit | Operational |
| 27 September; 06:11 | (South Korea) STSat-1 | | Low Earth | | In orbit | Operational |
| 27 September; 06:11 | Rubin-4-DSI | | Low Earth | | In orbit | Operational |
| 27 September; 06:11 | NigeriaSat-1 is the first Nigerian satellite | | | | | |
| 27 September; 23:14 | (France) Ariane 5G | | (France) Kourou ELA-3 | | (France) Arianespace | |
| 27 September; 23:14 | (France) Eurobird 3 | Eutelsat | Geosynchronous | Communications | In orbit | Operational |
| 27 September; 23:14 | (India) INSAT 3E | ISRO | Geosynchronous | Communications | In orbit | Successful |
| 27 September; 23:14 | SMART-1 | ESA | Selenocentric | Lunar probe | 27 September 2006; 05:42:22 | Successful |
| 27 September; 23:14 | Final flight of Ariane 5G | | | | | |
=== October ===
| 1 October; 04:02 | (Ukraine) Zenit-3SL | | (Norway) Ocean Odyssey | | (United Nations) Sea Launch | |
| 1 October; 04:02 | (Japan) (United States) Galaxy 13 (Horizons 1) | PanAmSat | Geosynchronous | Communications | In orbit | operational |
| 15 October; 01:00 | (China) Long March 2F | | (China) Jiuquan | | (China) | |
| 15 October; 01:00 | (China) Shenzhou 5 | CMSA | Low Earth | | 15 October; 22:53 | Successful |
| 15 October; 01:00 | (China) Shenzhou spacecraft orbital module | CMSA | Low Earth | Reconnaissance | 30 May 2004 | Successful |
| 15 October; 01:00 | Crewed orbital flight with 1 astronaut (Yang Liwei), first Chinese space traveller and indigenous crewed spaceflight | | | | | |
| 17 October; 04:54 | (India) PSLV | | (India) Satish Dhawan FLP | | (India) ISRO | |
| 17 October; 04:54 | (India) RESOURCESAT-1 (IRS-P6) | ISRO | Low Earth | Earth observation | In orbit | Operational |
| 18 October; 05:38 | (Russia) Soyuz-FG | | (Kazakhstan) Baikonur Site 1/5 | | (Russia) Roskosmos | |
| 18 October; 05:38 | (Russia) Soyuz TMA-3 | Roskosmos | Low Earth (ISS) | ISS Expedition 8 | 30 April 2004 | Successful |
| 18 October; 05:38 | Crewed orbital flight with 3 cosmonauts | | | | | |
| 18 October; 16:17 | (United States) Titan 23G/Star 37 | | (United States) Vandenberg SLC-4W | | (United States) Lockheed Martin | |
| 18 October; 16:17 | (United States) DMSP 5D-2 (USA-172) | US Air Force | Low Earth | Weather satellite | In orbit | Operational |
| 18 October; 16:17 | Final flight of Titan 23G | | | | | |
| 21 October; 03:16 | (China) Long March 4B | | (China) Taiyuan | | (China) | |
| 21 October; 03:16 | (China) / (Brazil) Zi Yuan 1-2 (CBERS-2) | CAAC/INPE | Low Earth | Earth resources | In orbit | Operational |
| 21 October; 03:16 | (China) Chuangxin-1 | CAS | Low Earth | Communications | In orbit | Operational |
| 30 October; 13:43 | (Russia) Rockot/Briz-KM | | (Russia) Plesetsk Site 133 | | (France) (Russia) Eurockot | |
| 30 October; 13:43 | (Japan) SERVIS-1 | | Low Earth | | In orbit | Operational |
=== November ===
| 3 November; 07:20 | (China) Long March 2D | | (China) Jiuquan | | (China) | |
| 3 November; 07:20 | (China) FSW-18 (FSW-3) | SAST | Low Earth | Imaging | 18 December | Successful |
| 14 November; 16:34 | (China) Long March 3A | | (China) Xichang | | (China) | |
| 14 November; 16:34 | (China) Zhongxing 20 | | Geosynchronous | Communications | In orbit | Operational |
| 24 November; 06:22 | (Russia) Proton-K/DM-2M | | (Kazakhstan) Baikonur Site 81/23 | | (Russia) VKS | |
| 24 November; 06:22 | (Russia) Yamal-201 | Gazprom | Geosynchronous | Communications | In orbit | Operational |
| 24 November; 06:22 | (Russia) Yamal 202 | Gazprom | Geosynchronous | Communications | In orbit | Operational |
| 29 November; 04:33 | (Japan) H-IIA 2024 | | (Japan) Tanegashima LA-Y1 | | (Japan) | |
| 29 November; 04:33 | (Japan) IGS-2A | Japanese Government | Low Earth | Reconnaissance | T+60 seconds | Launch failure |
| 29 November; 04:33 | (Japan) IGS-2B | | Low Earth | Reconnaissance | T+60 seconds | Launch failure |
| 29 November; 04:33 | SRB failed to separate. Destroyed by RSO. | | | | | |
=== December ===
| 2 December; 10:04 | (United States) Atlas IIAS | | (United States) Vandenberg SLC-3E | | (United States) | |
| 2 December; 10:04 | (United States) NOSS-3 (USA-173) | NRO | Low Earth | Naval SIGINT | In orbit | Operational |
| 2 December; 10:04 | (United States) NOSS-3 (USA-173) | NRO | Low Earth | Naval SIGINT | In orbit | Operational |
| 2 December; 10:04 | NRO launch 18 | | | | | |
| 5 December; 06:00 | (Russia) Strela | | (Kazakhstan) Baikonur Site 175 | | (Russia) VKS | |
| 5 December; 06:00 | (Russia) Gruzomaket | | Low Earth | Boilerplate | In orbit | Successful |
| 5 December; 06:00 | Maiden flight of Strela rocket | | | | | |
| 10 December; 17:42 | (Russia) Proton-K/Briz-M | | (Kazakhstan) Baikonur Site 81/24 | | (Russia) VKS | |
| 10 December; 17:42 | (Russia) Kosmos 2402 (GLONASS) | KNITs | Medium Earth | Navigation | In orbit | Operational |
| 10 December; 17:42 | (Russia) Kosmos 2403 (GLONASS) | KNITs | Medium Earth | Navigation | In orbit | Operational |
| 10 December; 17:42 | (Russia) Kosmos 2404 (GLONASS) | KNITs | Medium Earth | Navigation | In orbit | Operational |
| 18 December; 02:30 | (United States) Atlas IIIB | | (United States) Cape Canaveral SLC-36B | | (Russia) (United States) International Launch Services | |
| 18 December; 02:30 | (United States) UHF F/O F11 (USA-174) | US Navy | Geosynchronous | Communications | In orbit | Operational |
| 21 December; 08:05 | (United States) Delta II 7925-9.5 | | (United States) Cape Canaveral SLC-17A | | (United States) Boeing IDS | |
| 21 December; 08:05 | (United States) GPS IIR-10 (USA-175) | US Air Force | Medium Earth | Navigation | In orbit | Operational |
| 27 December; 21:30 | (Russia) Soyuz-FG/Fregat | | (Kazakhstan) Baikonur Site 31/6 | | (France) (Russia) Starsem | |
| 27 December; 21:30 | (Israel) AMOS-2 | Spacecom | Geosynchronous | Communications | In orbit | Operational |
| 28 December; 20:37 | (Russia) Proton-K/DM-2M | | (Kazakhstan) Baikonur Site 200/39 | | (Russia) VKS | |
| 28 December; 20:37 | (Russia) Ekspress AM22 | RSCC | Geosynchronous | Communications | In orbit | Operational |
| 29 December; 19:06 | (China) Long March 2C | | (China) Xichang | | (China) | |
| 29 December; 19:06 | (China) Tan Ce 1 (Double Star 1) | CNSA/ESA | High Earth (High-eccentricity) | Magnetosphere research | 14 October 2007 | Successful |

- ← Jan
- Feb
- Mar
- Apr
- May
- Jun
- Jul
- Aug
- Sep
- Oct
- Nov
- Dec →

== Suborbital launches ==
- ← Jan
- Feb
- Mar
- Apr
- May
- Jun
- Jul
- Aug
- Sep
- Oct
- Nov
- Dec →

| Date and time (UTC) | Rocket | Flight number | Launch site | | LSP | |
| Date and time (UTC) | Payload (⚀ = CubeSat) | Operator | Orbit | Function | Decay (UTC) | Outcome |
| Date and time (UTC) | Remarks | | | | | |
|---|---|---|---|---|---|---|
=== January ===
| 9 January; 03:17 | (India) Agni-I | | (India) Balasore IC-4 | | (India) IDRDL | |
| 9 January; 03:17 | | IDRDL | Suborbital | Missile test | 9 January | Successful |
=== March ===
| 26 March; 06:00 | (India) Prithvi-2 | | (India) Balasore | | (India) IDRDL | |
| 26 March; 06:00 | | IDRDL | Suborbital | Missile test | 26 March | Successful |
=== April ===
| 29 April; 05:50 | (India) Prithvi-2 | | (India) Balasore | | (India) IDRDL | |
| 29 April; 05:50 | | IDRDL | Suborbital | Missile test | 29 April | Successful |
=== December ===
| 24 December | Taiwan Sounding Rocket | Sounding Rocket III | (Taiwan) Jiu Peng Air Base | | (Taiwan) NSPO | |
| 24 December | (Taiwan) TMA release experiment | NSPO | Suborbital | Ionospheric research | 24 December; T+508 seconds | Successful |
| 24 December | Apogee: 265 km (165 mi) | | | | | |

- ← Jan
- Feb
- Mar
- Apr
- May
- Jun
- Jul
- Aug
- Sep
- Oct
- Nov
- Dec →

== Deep Space Rendezvous ==
| Date (GMT) | Spacecraft | Event | Remarks |
|---|---|---|---|
| 19 June | Nozomi | 3rd flyby of the Earth | |
| 21 September | Galileo | Deorbited into the Jovian atmosphere | |
| 9 December | Nozomi | Flyby of Mars | Damaged by solar flares |
| 24 December | Beagle 2 | Crashed at Isidis Planitia, Mars | |
| 24 December | Mars Express | Areocentric orbit injection | |

== EVAs ==
| Start date/time | Duration | End time | Spacecraft | Crew | Function | Remarks |
|---|---|---|---|---|---|---|
| 15 January; 12:50 | 6 hours 51 minutes | 19:41 | Expedition 6 ISS Quest | (United States) Kenneth Bowersox (United States) Donald Pettit | Released the remaining launch locks on the P1 radiator assembly, removed debris on a sealing ring of Unity's docking port, and tested an ammonia reservoir on the station's P6 truss. | |
| 8 April; 12:40 | 6 hours 26 minutes | 19:06 | Expedition 6 ISS Quest | (United States) Kenneth Bowersox (United States) Donald Pettit | Reconfigured cables on the S0 (S-Zero), S1 and P1 trusses, replaced a Power Control Module on the Mobile Transporter, installed Spool Positioning Devices on Destiny, and reinstalled a thermal cover on an S1 Radiator Beam Valve Module. | |

== Orbital launch statistics ==
=== By country ===
For the purposes of this section, the yearly tally of orbital launches by country assigns each flight to the country of origin of the rocket, not to the launch services provider or the spaceport.

| Country | Launches | Successes | Failures | Partial failures |
|---|---|---|---|---|
| Brazil | 1 | 0 | 1 | 0 |
| China | 7 | 6 | 1 | 0 |
| France | 4 | 4 | 0 | 0 |
| India | 2 | 2 | 0 | 0 |
| Japan | 3 | 2 | 1 | 0 |
| Russia | 21 | 21 | 0 | 0 |
| Ukraine | 3 | 3 | 0 | 0 |
| United States | 23 | 22 | 1 | 0 |
| World | 64 | 60 | 4 | 0 |

=== By rocket ===
- Ariane 4
- Ariane 5
- Atlas II
- Atlas III
- Atlas V
- Delta II
- Delta IV
- H-IIA
- Long March 2
- Long March 3
- Long March 4
- Pegasus
- Molniya-M
- Soyuz-U
- Soyuz-FG
- Kosmos-3M
- Titan 23G
- Titan IV
- Proton-K
- Rokot
- Strela
- Zenit-3SL
- Others

==== By family ====
| Family | Country | Launches | Successes | Failures | Partial failures | Remarks |
|---|---|---|---|---|---|---|
| Ariane | France | 4 | 4 | 0 | 0 | |
| Atlas | United States | 5 | 5 | 0 | 0 | |
| Delta | United States | 9 | 9 | 0 | 0 | |
| GSLV | India | 1 | 1 | 0 | 0 | |
| H-II | Japan | 2 | 1 | 1 | 0 | |
| Kaituozhe | China | 1 | 0 | 1 | 0 | |
| Long March | China | 6 | 6 | 0 | 0 | |
| Mu | Japan | 1 | 1 | 0 | 0 | |
| Pegasus | United States | 4 | 4 | 0 | 0 | |
| PSLV | India | 1 | 1 | 0 | 0 | |
| R-7 | Russia | 10 | 10 | 0 | 0 | |
| R-14 | Russia | 3 | 3 | 0 | 0 | |
| Space Shuttle | United States | 1 | 0 | 1 | 0 | Columbia disintegrated on reentry |
| Titan | United States | 4 | 4 | 0 | 0 | |
| Universal Rocket | Russia | 8 | 8 | 0 | 0 | |
| Zenit | Ukraine | 3 | 3 | 0 | 0 | |

==== By type ====
| Rocket | Country | Family | Launches | Successes | Failures | Partial failures | Remarks |
|---|---|---|---|---|---|---|---|
| Ariane 4 | France | Ariane | 1 | 1 | 0 | 0 | Final flight |
| Ariane 5 | France | Ariane | 3 | 3 | 0 | 0 | |
| Atlas II | United States | Atlas | 1 | 1 | 0 | 0 | |
| Atlas III | United States | Atlas | 2 | 2 | 0 | 0 | |
| Atlas V | United States | Atlas | 2 | 2 | 0 | 0 | |
| Delta II | United States | Delta | 7 | 7 | 0 | 0 | |
| Delta IV | United States | Delta | 2 | 2 | 0 | 0 | |
| GSLV | India | GSLV | 1 | 1 | 0 | 0 | |
| H-IIA | Japan | H-II | 2 | 1 | 1 | 0 | |
| Kaituozhe-1 | China | Kaituozhe | 1 | 0 | 1 | 0 | |
| Kosmos | Russia | R-12/R-14 | 3 | 3 | 0 | 0 | |
| Long March 2 | China | Long March | 3 | 3 | 0 | 0 | |
| Long March 3 | China | Long March | 2 | 2 | 0 | 0 | |
| Long March 4 | China | Long March | 1 | 1 | 0 | 0 | |
| Molniya | Russia | R-7 | 2 | 2 | 0 | 0 | |
| M-V | Japan | Mu | 1 | 1 | 0 | 0 | |
| Pegasus | United States | Pegasus | 4 | 4 | 0 | 0 | |
| PSLV | India | PSLV | 1 | 1 | 0 | 0 | |
| Proton | Russia | Universal Rocket | 5 | 5 | 0 | 0 | |
| Soyuz | Russia | R-7 | 8 | 8 | 0 | 0 | |
| Space Shuttle | United States | Space Shuttle | 1 | 0 | 1 | 0 | |
| Titan II | United States | Titan | 2 | 2 | 0 | 0 | Final flight |
| Titan IV | United States | Titan | 2 | 2 | 0 | 0 | |
| UR-100 | Russia | Universal Rocket | 3 | 3 | 0 | 0 | |
| Zenit | Ukraine | Zenit | 3 | 3 | 0 | 0 | |

==== By configuration ====
| Rocket | Country | Type | Launches | Successes | Failures | Partial failures | Remarks |
|---|---|---|---|---|---|---|---|
| Ariane 4 44L | France | Ariane 4 | 1 | 1 | 0 | 0 | Final flight |
| Ariane 5G | France | Ariane 5 | 3 | 3 | 0 | 0 | Final flight |
| Atlas IIAS | United States | Atlas II | 1 | 1 | 0 | 0 | |
| Atlas IIIB | United States | Atlas III | 2 | 2 | 0 | 0 | |
| Atlas V 401 | United States | Atlas V | 1 | 1 | 0 | 0 | |
| Atlas V 521 | United States | Atlas V | 1 | 1 | 0 | 0 | Maiden flight |
| Delta II 7320-10C | United States | Delta II | 1 | 1 | 0 | 0 | |
| Delta II 7920H | United States | Delta II | 1 | 1 | 0 | 0 | |
| Delta II 7925H | United States | Delta II | 2 | 2 | 0 | 0 | |
| Delta II 7925–9.5 | United States | Delta II | 3 | 3 | 0 | 0 | |
| Delta IV Medium | United States | Delta IV | 2 | 2 | 0 | 0 | Maiden flight |
| GSLV Mk I | India | GSLV | 1 | 1 | 0 | 0 | |
| H-IIA 2024 | Japan | H-IIA | 2 | 1 | 1 | 0 | |
| Kaituozhe-1 | China | Kaituozhe-1 | 1 | 0 | 1 | 0 | |
| Kosmos-3M | Russia | Kosmos | 3 | 3 | 0 | 0 | |
| Long March 2C | China | Long March 2 | 1 | 1 | 0 | 0 | |
| Long March 2D | China | Long March 2 | 1 | 1 | 0 | 0 | |
| Long March 2F | China | Long March 2 | 1 | 1 | 0 | 0 | |
| Long March 3A | China | Long March 3 | 2 | 2 | 0 | 0 | |
| Long March 4B | China | Long March 4 | 1 | 1 | 0 | 0 | |
| Molniya-M | Russia | Molniya | 2 | 2 | 0 | 0 | |
| M-V | Japan | M-V | 1 | 1 | 0 | 0 | |
| Pegasus-XL | United States | Pegasus | 4 | 4 | 0 | 0 | |
| PSLV-G | India | PSLV | 1 | 1 | 0 | 0 | |
| Proton-K / DM-2 | Russia | Proton | 3 | 3 | 0 | 0 | |
| Proton-K / Briz-M | Russia | Proton | 2 | 2 | 0 | 0 | |
| Rokot / Briz-KM | Russia | UR-100 | 2 | 2 | 0 | 0 | |
| Soyuz-U | Russia | Soyuz | 4 | 4 | 0 | 0 | |
| Soyuz-FG | Russia | Soyuz | 2 | 2 | 0 | 0 | |
| Soyuz-FG / Fregat | Russia | Soyuz | 2 | 2 | 0 | 0 | |
| Space Shuttle | United States | Space Shuttle | 1 | 0 | 1 | 0 | |
| Strela | Russia | UR-100 | 1 | 1 | 0 | 0 | Maiden flight |
| Titan 23G | United States | Titan II | 1 | 1 | 0 | 0 | Final flight |
| Titan 23G / Star 37 | United States | Titan II | 1 | 1 | 0 | 0 | Final flight |
| Titan IV-B (401B) / Centaur | United States | Titan IV | 2 | 2 | 0 | 0 | Final flight |
| Zenit-3SL | Ukraine | Zenit | 3 | 3 | 0 | 0 | |

=== By spaceport ===
- Alcântara
- Jiuquan
- Taiyuan
- Xichang
- Kourou
- Satish Dhawan
- Ocean Odyssey
- Tanegashima
- Uchinoura
- Baikonur
- Plesetsk
- Cape Canaveral
- Kennedy
- Vandenberg

| Site | Country | Launches | Successes | Failures | Partial failures | Remarks |
|---|---|---|---|---|---|---|
| Alcântara | Brazil | 1 | 0 | 1 | 0 | |
| Baikonur | Kazakhstan | 14 | 14 | 0 | 0 | |
| Cape Canaveral | United States | 16 | 16 | 0 | 0 | Two launches used Stargazer aircraft |
| Jiuquan | China | 2 | 2 | 0 | 0 | |
| Kennedy | United States | 1 | 0 | 1 | 0 | |
| Kourou | France | 4 | 4 | 0 | 0 | |
| Ocean Odyssey | (United Nations) International waters | 3 | 3 | 0 | 0 | |
| Plesetsk | Russia | 7 | 7 | 0 | 0 | |
| Satish Dhawan | India | 2 | 2 | 0 | 0 | |
| Taiyuan | China | 2 | 1 | 1 | 0 | |
| Tanegashima | Japan | 2 | 1 | 1 | 0 | |
| Uchinoura | Japan | 1 | 1 | 0 | 0 | |
| Vandenberg | United States | 6 | 6 | 0 | 0 | Two launches used Stargazer aircraft |
| Xichang | China | 3 | 3 | 0 | 0 | |
| Total | | 64 | 60 | 4 | 0 | |

=== By orbit ===
- Transatmospheric
- Low Earth
- Low Earth (ISS)
- Low Earth (SSO)
- Low Earth (retrograde)
- Medium Earth
- Geosychronous
  (transfer)
- Inclined GSO
- High Earth
- Heliocentric

| Orbital regime | Launches | Successes | Failures | Accidentally achieved | Remarks |
|---|---|---|---|---|---|
| Transatmospheric | 0 | 0 | 0 | 0 | |
| Low Earth | 29 | 26 | 3 | 0 | 5 to ISS |
| Medium Earth / Molniya | 6 | 6 | 0 | 0 | |
| Geosynchronous / GTO | 23 | 23 | 0 | 0 | |
| High Earth / Lunar transfer | 1 | 1 | 0 | 0 | |
| Heliocentric / Planetary transfer | 5 | 5 | 0 | 0 | |
| Total | 64 | 61 | 3 | 0 | |
