= 2002 in spaceflight =

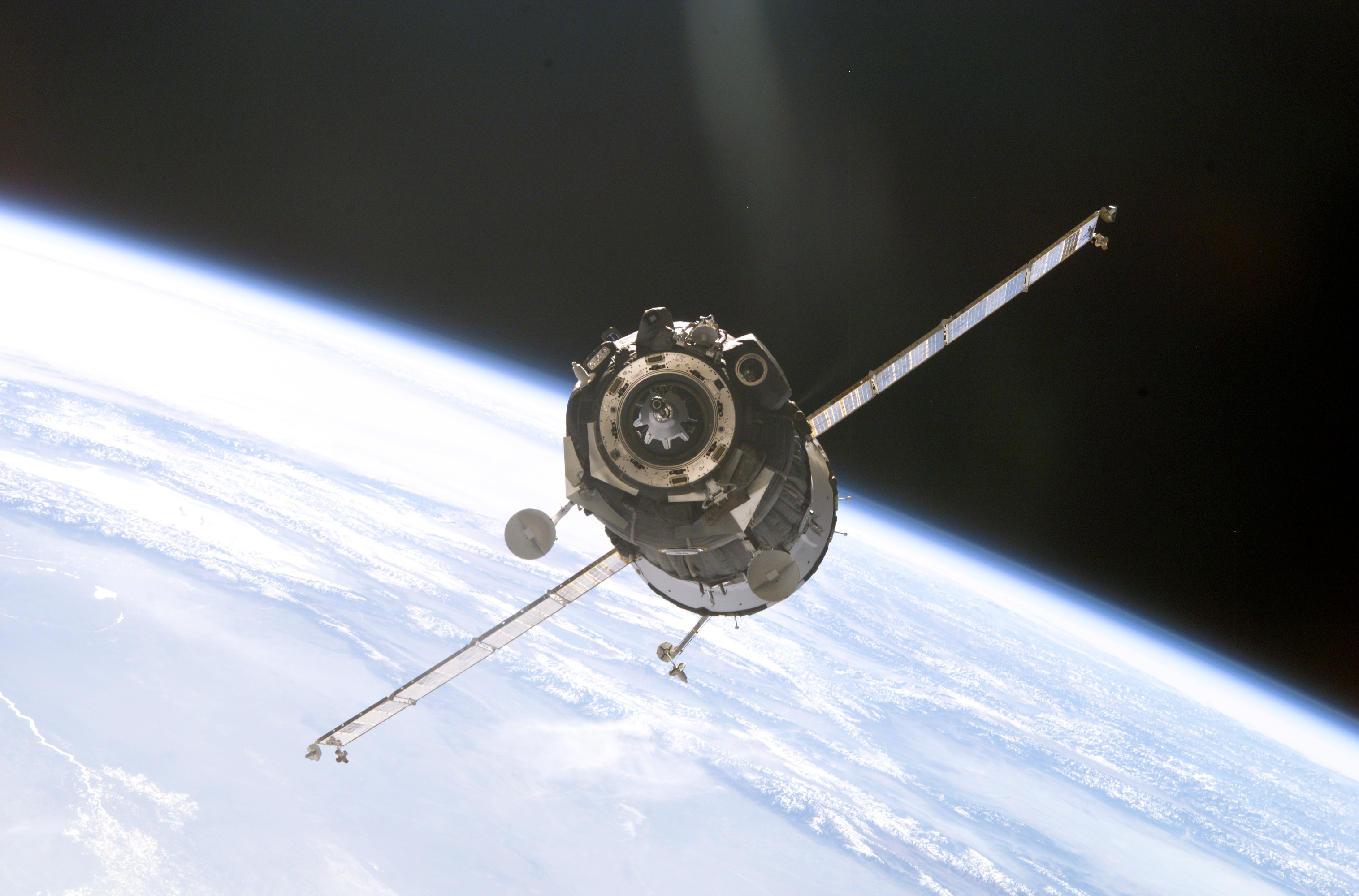
- Soyuz TMA-1, the first Soyuz-TMA spacecraft, approaches the International Space Station in November

Orbital launches
- First: 16 January
- Last: 29 December
- Total: 65
- Successes: 60
- Failures: 5
- Catalogued: 62

National firsts
- Satellite: Algeria
- Space traveller: South Africa

Rockets
- Maiden flights: Ariane 5ECA; Atlas IIIB; Atlas V 401; Delta IV-M+ (4,2); H-IIA 2024; Kaituozhe-1
- Retirements: Ariane 4 42L; Ariane 4 42P; Atlas IIA

Crewed flights
- Orbital: 7
- Total travellers: 40

This article outlines notable events occurring in 2002 in spaceflight, including major launches and EVAs.

2002 in spaceflight

== Launches ==
- ← Jan
- Feb
- Mar
- Apr
- May
- Jun
- Jul
- Aug
- Sep
- Oct
- Nov
- Dec →

Date and time (UTC)	Rocket	Flight number	Launch site		LSP	
Date and time (UTC)	Payload (⚀ = CubeSat)	Operator	Orbit	Function	Decay (UTC)	Outcome
Date and time (UTC)	Remarks					
=== January ===
16 January; 00:30	(United States) Titan IVB (401)/Centaur		(United States) Cape Canaveral SLC-40		(United States) Lockheed Martin	
16 January; 00:30	(United States) Milstar DFS-5 (USA-164)	US Air Force	Geosynchronous	Communications	In orbit	Operational
23 January; 23:46	(France) Ariane 4 42L		(France) Kourou ELA-2		(France) Arianespace	
23 January; 23:46	(India) INSAT-3C	ISRO	Geosynchronous	Communications	In orbit	Operational
23 January; 23:46	Final flight of Ariane 4 42L					
=== February ===
4 February; 02:45	(Japan) H-IIA 2024		(Japan) Tanegashima LA-Y1		(Japan) MHI	
4 February; 02:45	(Japan) MDS-1	NASDA	Geostationary transfer orbit	Technology demonstration	In orbit	Successful
4 February; 02:45	(Japan) DASH	ISAS	Geostationary transfer orbit	Re-entry demonstration	In orbit	Spacecraft failure
4 February; 02:45	(Japan) VEP-3	NASDA	Geostationary transfer orbit	Launch vehicle evaluation	In orbit	Successful
4 February; 02:45	Maiden flight of H-IIA 2024. DASH failed to separate from VEP-3 instrumented payload adapter.					
5 February; 20:58	(United States) Pegasus-XL		(United States) Stargazer, Cape Canaveral		(United States) Orbital Sciences	
5 February; 20:58	(United States) RHESSI	NASA	Low Earth	Heliophysics	In orbit	Successful
11 February; 17:45	(United States) Delta II 7920-10C		(United States) Vandenberg SLC-2W		(United States) Boeing IDS	
11 February; 17:45	(United States) Iridium 91	Iridium	Low Earth	Communications	13 March 2019	Successful
11 February; 17:45	(United States) Iridium 90	Iridium	Low Earth	Communications	23 January 2019	Successful
11 February; 17:45	(United States) Iridium 94	Iridium	Low Earth	Communications	18 April 2018	Successful
11 February; 17:45	(United States) Iridium 95	Iridium	Low Earth	Communications	25 March 2019	Successful
11 February; 17:45	(United States) Iridium 96	Iridium	Low Earth	Communications	30 May 2020	Successful
21 February; 12:43	(United States) Atlas IIIB-DEC	AC-204	(United States) Cape Canaveral SLC-36B		(Russia) (United States) International Launch Services	
21 February; 12:43	(United States) Echostar 7	Echostar	Geosynchronous	Communications	In orbit	Operational
21 February; 12:43	Maiden flight of Atlas IIIB.					
23 February; 06:59	(France) Ariane 4 44L		(France) Kourou ELA-2		(France) Arianespace	
23 February; 06:59	(United Nations) Intelsat 904	Intelsat	Geosynchronous	Communications	In orbit	Operational
25 February; 17:26	(Russia) Soyuz-U		(Russia) Plesetsk Site 43/3		(Russia) VKS	
25 February; 17:26	(Russia) Kosmos 2387 (Yantar-4K2/Kobalt #81)	GRU	Low Earth	Reconnaissance	27 June; 02:30	Successful
=== March ===
1 March; 01:07	(France) Ariane 5G		(France) Kourou ELA-3		(France) Arianespace	
1 March; 01:07	Envisat	ESA	Sun-synchronous	Environmental research	In orbit	Successful
1 March; 11:22	(United States) Space Shuttle Columbia		(United States) Kennedy LC-39A		(United States) United Space Alliance	
1 March; 11:22	(United States) STS-109	NASA	Low Earth (HST)	HST servicing	12 March	Operational
1 March; 11:22	Crewed orbital flight with 7 astronauts Hubble Space Telescope servicing mission 3B					
8 March; 22:59	(United States) Atlas IIA		(United States) Cape Canaveral SLC-36A		(Russia) (United States) International Launch Services	
8 March; 22:59	(United States) TDRS-9 (TDRS-I)	NASA	Geosynchronous	Communications	In orbit	Partial spacecraft failure Operational
8 March; 22:59	Propellant issues shortly after launch halved spacecraft fuel supply					
17 March; 09:21	(Russia) Rockot/Briz-KM		(Russia) Plesetsk Site 133/3		(France) (Russia) Eurockot	
17 March; 09:21	(United States) (Germany) GRACE 1	NASA/DLR	Sun-synchronous	Gravity research	10 March 2018; 06:09 UTC	Successful
17 March; 09:21	(United States) (Germany) GRACE 2	NASA/DLR	Sun-synchronous	Gravity research	24 December 2017; 00:16 UTC	Successful
21 March; 20:13	(Russia) Soyuz-U		(Kazakhstan) Baikonur Site 1/5		(Russia) Roskosmos	
21 March; 20:13	(Russia) Progress M1-8	Roskosmos	Low Earth (ISS)	Logistics	25 June; 12:13	Successful
21 March; 20:13	ISS flight 7P					
25 March; 14:15	(China) Long March 2F		(China) Jiuquan		(China) CAAC	
25 March; 14:15	(China) Shenzhou 3	CMSA	Low Earth	Test spacecraft	1 April; 08:51	Successful
25 March; 14:15	(China) Shenzhou spacecraft orbital module	CMSA	Low Earth	Scientific research	12 November	Successful
29 March; 01:29	(France) Ariane 4 44L		(France) Kourou ELA-2		(France) Arianespace	
29 March; 01:29	(Luxembourg) Astra 3A	SES Astra	Geosynchronous	Communications	In orbit	Operational
29 March; 01:29	(Japan) JCSAT 8	JSAT	Geosynchronous	Communications	In orbit	Operational
30 March; 17:25	(Russia) Proton-K/DM-2M		(Kazakhstan) Baikonur Site 81/23		(Russia) (United States) International Launch Services	
30 March; 17:25	(United Nations) Intelsat 903	Intelsat	Geosynchronous	Communications	In orbit	Operational
=== April ===
1 April; 22:06	(Russia) Molniya-M/Blok 2BL		(Russia) Plesetsk Site 16/2		(Russia) VKS	
1 April; 22:06	(Russia) Kosmos 2388 (US-K #81)	VKS	Molniya	Missile early warning	14 September 2011	Operational
8 April; 20:44	(United States) Space Shuttle Atlantis		(United States) Kennedy LC-39B		(United States) United Space Alliance	
8 April; 20:44	(United States) STS-110	NASA	Low Earth (ISS)	ISS assembly	19 April	Successful
8 April; 20:44	(United Nations) S0 Truss	NASA	Low Earth (ISS)	ISS component	In orbit	Operational
8 April; 20:44	Crewed orbital flight with 7 astronauts					
16 April; 23:02	(France) Ariane 4 44L		(France) Kourou ELA-2		(France) Arianespace	
16 April; 23:02	(Netherlands) NSS 7	SES New Skies	Geosynchronous	Communications	In orbit	Operational
25 April; 06:26	(Russia) Soyuz-U		(Kazakhstan) Baikonur Site 1/5		(Russia) Roskosmos	
25 April; 06:26	(Russia) Soyuz TM-34	Roskosmos	Low Earth (ISS)	ISS escape craft	10 November	Successful
25 April; 06:26	Crewed orbital flight with 3 cosmonauts including one space tourist and the first South African space traveller Final flight of Soyuz-TM spacecraft					
=== May ===
4 May; 01:31	(France) Ariane 4 42P	V151	(France) Kourou ELA-2		(France) Arianespace	
4 May; 01:31	(France) SPOT 5	CNES	Low Earth	Earth imaging	In orbit	Operational
4 May; 01:31	(France) BreizhSat-Oscar 47 (Indefix)	AMSAT	Low Earth	Amateur radio	In orbit	Operational
4 May; 01:31	(France) BreizhSat-Oscar 48 (Indefix)	AMSAT	Low Earth	Amateur radio	In orbit	Operational
4 May; 01:31	Final flight of Ariane 4 42P. Both Indefix payloads were permanently attached to the third stage of Ariane 4					
4 May; 09:54	(United States) Delta II 7920-10L	D-291	(United States) Vandenberg SLC-2W		(United States) Boeing IDS	
4 May; 09:54	(United States) Aqua	NASA	Sun-synchronous (A-train)	Environmental research	In orbit	Operational
7 May; 17:00	(Russia) Proton-K/Blok DM3		(Kazakhstan) Baikonur Site 81/23		(Russia) (United States) International Launch Services	
7 May; 17:00	(United States) DirecTV-5	DirecTV	Geosynchronous	Communications	In orbit	Operational
15 May; 01:50	(China) Long March 4B	Y5	(China) Taiyuan LA-7		(China)	
15 May; 01:50	(China) Hai Yang 1	CASC	Low Earth	Earth observation	In orbit	Operational
15 May; 01:50	(China) Feng Yun 1D	CASC	Low Earth	Weather satellite	In orbit	Operational
28 May; 15:25	(Israel) Shavit-1		(Israel) Palmachim		(Israel) IAI	
28 May; 15:25	(Israel) Ofeq-5		Low Earth (retrograde)	Reconnaissance	21 February 2024	Operational
28 May; 18:14	(Russia) Kosmos-3M		(Russia) Plesetsk Site 132/1		(Russia) VKS	
28 May; 18:14	(Russia) Kosmos 2389 (Parus #93)		Low Earth	Navigation	In orbit	Operational
=== June ===
5 June; 06:44	(France) Ariane 4 44L		(France) Kourou ELA-2		(France) Arianespace	
5 June; 06:44	(United Nations) Intelsat 905	Intelsat	Geosynchronous	Communications	In orbit	Operational
5 June; 21:22	(United States) Space Shuttle Endeavour		(United States) Kennedy LC-39A		(United States) United Space Alliance	
5 June; 21:22	(United States) STS-111	NASA	Low Earth (ISS)	ISS assembly	19 June	Successful
5 June; 21:22	(Italy) (United States) Leonardo MPLM	ASI / NASA	Low Earth (ISS)	ISS logistics	19 June	Successful
5 June; 21:22	(Canada) Canadarm2 Mobile Base Structure	CSA / NASA	Low Earth (ISS)	ISS component	In orbit	Operational
5 June; 21:22	Crewed orbital flight with 7 astronauts ISS crew exchange (launched Expedition 5)					
10 June; 01:14	(Russia) Proton-K / DM-2M		(Kazakhstan) Baikonur Site 200/39		(Russia) Khrunichev	
10 June; 01:14	(Russia) Ekspress A4 (A1R)	RSCC	Geosynchronous	Communications	In orbit	Successful
10 June; 01:14	Guidance error during ascent, recovered and placed in correct orbit using upper stage. Decommissioned in early 2020 after seventeen years in service.					
15 June; 22:39	(Ukraine) Zenit-3SL		(Norway) Ocean Odyssey		(United Nations) Sea Launch	
15 June; 22:39	(United States) Galaxy 3C	PanAmSat	Geosynchronous	Communications	In orbit	Operational
20 June; 09:33	(Russia) Rockot / Briz-KM		(Russia) Plesetsk Site 133/3		(France) (Russia) Eurockot	
20 June; 09:33	(United States) Iridium 97	Iridium	Low Earth	Communications	27 December 2019; 17:30	Successful
20 June; 09:33	(United States) Iridium 98	Iridium	Low Earth	Communications	24 August 2018	Successful
24 June; 18:23	(United States) Titan 23G		(United States) Vandenberg SLC-4W		(United States) Lockheed Martin	
24 June; 18:23	(United States) NOAA-17 (NOAA-M)	NOAA	Low Earth (SSO)	Meteorology	In orbit	Successful
24 June; 18:23	Decommissioned on 10 April 2013. Disintegrated in orbit on 10 March 2021, with 16 associated pieces of space debris being tracked.					
26 June; 05:36	(Russia) Soyuz-U		(Kazakhstan) Baikonur Site 1/5		(Russia) Roscosmos	
26 June; 05:36	(Russia) Progress M-46	Roscosmos	Low Earth (ISS)	ISS logistics	14 October	Successful
26 June; 05:36	ISS flight 8P					
=== July ===
3 July; 06:47	(United States) Delta II 7425-9.5		(United States) Cape Canaveral SLC-17A		(United States) Boeing IDS	
3 July; 06:47	(United States) CONTOUR	NASA	Intended: Heliocentric	Comet probe	In orbit	Spacecraft failure
3 July; 06:47	Exploded during injection into Heliocentric orbit Intended to visit comet 2P/Encke					
5 July; 23:22	(France) Ariane 5G		(France) Kourou ELA-3		(France) Arianespace	
5 July; 23:22	(France) Stellat 5	Stellat	Geosynchronous	Communications	In orbit	Operational
5 July; 23:22	(France) N-STAR c	Stellat	Geosynchronous	Communications	In orbit	Operational
8 July; 06:35	(Russia) Kosmos-3M		(Russia) Plesetsk Site 132/1		(Russia) VKS	
8 July; 06:35	(Russia) Kosmos 2390 (Strela-3 #131)		Low Earth	Communications	In orbit	Operational
8 July; 06:35	(Russia) Kosmos 2391 (Strela-3 #132)		Low Earth	Communications	In orbit	Operational
25 July; 15:13	(Russia) Proton-K/Blok DM-5 (17S40)		(Kazakhstan) Baikonur Site 81/24		(Russia) VKS	
25 July; 15:13	(Russia) Kosmos 2392 (Araks-N #2)		Low Earth	Reconnaissance	In orbit	Successful
=== August ===
21 August; 22:05	(United States) Atlas V 401		(United States) Cape Canaveral SLC-41		(Russia) (United States) International Launch Services	
21 August; 22:05	(France) Hot Bird 6	Eutelsat	Geosynchronous	Communications	In orbit	Operational
21 August; 22:05	Maiden flight of Atlas V and the first launch of an EELV class rocket					
22 August; 05:15	(Russia) Proton-K/DM-2M		(Kazakhstan) Baikonur Site 81/23		(Russia) (United States) International Launch Services	
22 August; 05:15	(United States) Echostar 8	Echostar	Geosynchronous	Communications	In orbit	Operational
28 August; 22:45	(France) Ariane 5G		(France) Kourou ELA-3		(France) Arianespace	
28 August; 22:45	(France) Atlantic Bird 1	Eutelsat	Geosynchronous	Communications	In orbit	Operational
28 August; 22:45	Meteosat 8	Eumetsat	Geosynchronous	Weather satellite	In orbit	Operational
=== September ===
6 September; 06:44	(France) Ariane 4 44L		(France) Kourou ELA-2		(France) Arianespace	
6 September; 06:44	(United Nations) Intelsat 906	Intelsat	Geosynchronous	Communications	In orbit	Operational
10 September; 08:20	(Japan) H-IIA 2024		(Japan) Tanegashima LA-Y1		(Japan)	
10 September; 08:20	(Japan) USERS	JAXA	Low Earth	Microgravity experiments	15 June 2007; 19:56	Successful
10 September; 08:20	(Japan) DRTS	NASDA	Geostationary	Communications	In orbit	Successful
12 September; 10:23	(India) PSLV-C		(India) Satish Dhawan FLP		(India) ISRO	
12 September; 10:23	(India) Kalpana-1 (METSAT 1)	ISRO	Geostationary	Weather satellite	In orbit	Operational
15 September; 10:30	(China) Kaituozhe-1		(China) Taiyuan		(China)	
15 September; 10:30	(China) HTSTL-1	Tsinghua University	Intended: Low Earth	Experimental	15 September	Launch failure
15 September; 10:30	Maiden flight of Kaituozhe-1. Second stage malfunction					
18 September; 22:04	(United States) Atlas IIAS		(United States) Cape Canaveral SLC-36A		(Russia) (United States) International Launch Services	
18 September; 22:04	(Spain) Hispasat 1D	Hispasat	Geosynchronous	Communications	In orbit	Operational
25 September; 16:58	(Russia) Soyuz-FG		(Kazakhstan) Baikonur Site 1/5		(Russia) Roskosmsos	
25 September; 16:58	(Russia) Progress M1-9	Roskosmos	Low Earth (ISS)	Logistics	1 February 2003	Successful
25 September; 16:58	ISS flight 9P					
26 September; 14:27	(Russia) Kosmos-3M		(Russia) Plesetsk Site 132/1		(Russia) VKS	
26 September; 14:27	(Russia) Nadezhda-M	VKS	Low Earth	Navigation	In orbit	Operational
=== October ===
7 October; 10:46	(United States) Space Shuttle Atlantis		(United States) Kennedy LC-39B		(United States) United Space Alliance	
7 October; 10:46	(United States) STS-112	NASA	Low Earth (ISS)	ISS assembly	18 October	Successful
7 October; 10:46	(United Nations) S1 Truss	NASA	Low Earth (ISS)	ISS component	In orbit	Operational
7 October; 10:46	(United Nations) CETA	NASA	Low Earth (ISS)	ISS component	In orbit	Operational
7 October; 10:46	Crewed orbital flight with 6 astronauts					
15 October; 18:20	(Russia) Soyuz-U		(Russia) Plesetsk Site 43/3		(Russia)	
15 October; 18:20	(Russia) Foton-M1	ESA	Intended: Low Earth	Microgravity experiments	T+29 seconds	Launch failure
15 October; 18:20	LRB exploded					
17 October; 04:41	(Russia) Proton-K/Blok DM-2		(Kazakhstan) Baikonur Site 81/23		(Russia)	
17 October; 04:41	INTEGRAL	ESA	High Earth (High eccentricity)	Astrophysics	In orbit	Operational
27 October; 03:17	(China) Long March 4B	Y6	(China) Taiyuan LA-7		(China)	
27 October; 03:17	(China) Ziyuan II-02	CAST	Sun-synchronous	Earth observation Reconnaissance (alleged)	22 January 2015	Successful
30 October; 03:11	(Russia) Soyuz-FG		(Kazakhstan) Baikonur Site 1/5		(Russia) Roskosmos	
30 October; 03:11	(Russia) Soyuz TMA-1	Roskosmos	Low Earth (ISS)	ISS escape craft	4 May 2003	Successful
30 October; 03:11	Crewed orbital flight with 3 cosmonauts Maiden flight of Soyuz-TMA spacecraft					
=== November ===
20 November; 22:39	(United States) Delta IV-M+ (4,2) (9240)		(United States) Cape Canaveral SLC-37B		(United States) Boeing IDS	
20 November; 22:39	(France) Eutelsat W5	Eutelsat	Geosynchronous	Communications	In orbit	Operational
20 November; 22:39	Maiden flight of Delta IV					
24 November; 00:49	(United States) Space Shuttle Endeavour		(United States) Kennedy LC-39A		(United States) United Space Alliance	
24 November; 00:49	(United States) STS-113	NASA	Low Earth (ISS)	ISS assembly	7 December	Successful
24 November; 00:49	(United Nations) P1 Truss	NASA	Low Earth (ISS)	ISS component	In orbit	Operational
24 November; 00:49	(United States) MEPSI	NASA	Low Earth	Technology demonstration	31 January 2003	Successful
24 November; 00:49	Crewed orbital flight with 7 astronauts ISS crew exchange (launched Expedition 6); MEPSI is 2 picosatellites connected by a 15 meter tether					
25 November; 23:04	(Russia) Proton-K/DM-2M		(Kazakhstan) Baikonur Site 81/23		(Russia) (United States) International Launch Services	
25 November; 23:04	(Luxembourg) Astra 1K	SES Astra	Intended: Geosynchronous; Attained: Low Earth	Communications	10 December	Launch failure
25 November; 23:04	Upper stage malfunction resulted in satellite being placed into an unusable parking orbit. Intentionally de-orbited.					
28 November; 06:07	(Russia) Kosmos-3M		(Russia) Plesetsk Site 132/1		(Russia) VKS	
28 November; 06:07	(Algeria) AlSat-1	CNTS	Low Earth	Disaster monitoring	In orbit	Operational
28 November; 06:07	(Russia) Mozhayets-3	Mozhaisky	Low Earth	Technology demonstration	In orbit	Operational
28 November; 06:07	(Germany) Rubin-3-DSI	OHB System	Low Earth	Measure carrier rocket performance	In orbit	Successful
28 November; 06:07	AlSat was first Algerian satellite, Rubin intentionally remained attached to upper stage					
=== December ===
5 December; 02:42	(United States) Atlas IIA		(United States) Cape Canaveral SLC-36A		(Russia) (United States) International Launch Services	
5 December; 02:42	(United States) TDRS-10 (TDRS-J)	NASA	Geosynchronous	Communications	In orbit	Operational
5 December; 02:42	Final flight of Atlas IIA					
11 December; 22:22	(France) Ariane 5ECA		(France) Kourou ELA-3		(France) Arianespace	
11 December; 22:22	(France) Hot Bird 7	Eutelsat	Intended: Geosynchronous	Communications	T+178 seconds	Launch failure
11 December; 22:22	(France) Stentor	Eutelsat	Intended: Geosynchronous	Communications	T+178 seconds	Launch failure
11 December; 22:22	Engine failure leading to loss of control, self-destruct activated Maiden flight of Ariane 5ECA					
14 December; 23:04	(Japan) H-IIA 202		(Japan) Tanegashima LA-Y1		(Japan)	
14 December; 23:04	(Japan) Adeos 2	NASDA	Low Earth	Environmental research	In orbit	Operational
14 December; 23:04	(Japan) Mu-Labsat	NASDA	Low Earth	Technology development	In orbit	Operational
14 December; 23:04	(Japan) RITE	NASDA	Low Earth	Technology development	In orbit	Operational
14 December; 23:04	(Japan) RITE	NASDA	Low Earth	Technology development	In orbit	Operational
14 December; 23:04	(Australia) FedSat	Centre for Satellite Systems	Low Earth	Communications	In orbit	Operational
14 December; 23:04	(Japan) WEOS (Kanta-Kun)	Chiba Institute of Technology	Low Earth	Whale monitoring	In orbit	Operational
14 December; 23:04	RITE deployed by Mu-Labsat on 14 March 2003 at 01:40 and 01:50 UTC					
17 December; 23:04	(France) Ariane 4 44L		(France) Kourou ELA-2		(France) Arianespace	
17 December; 23:04	(Netherlands) NSS-6	SES New Skies	Geosynchronous	Communications	In orbit	Operational
20 December; 17:00	(Ukraine) Dnepr		(Kazakhstan) Baikonur Site 109/95		(Russia) ISC Kosmotras	
20 December; 17:00	(Argentina) LatinSat 1	Aprize	Low Earth	Communications	In orbit	Operational
20 December; 17:00	(Argentina) LatinSat 2	Aprize	Low Earth	Communications	In orbit	Operational
20 December; 17:00	(Saudi Arabia) SaudiSat 1S	RSRI	Low Earth	Communications	In orbit	Operational
20 December; 17:00	(Italy) UniSat 2	University of Rome La Sapienza	Low Earth	Technology development	In orbit	Operational
20 December; 17:00	(Germany) Rubin 2	OHB System	Low Earth	Communications	In orbit	Operational
24 December; 12:20	(Russia) Molniya-M/Blok 2BL		(Russia) Plesetsk Site 16/2		(Russia) VKS	
24 December; 12:20	(Russia) Kosmos 2393 (US-K #82)	VKS	Molniya	Missile early warning	22 December 2013	Successful
25 December; 10:37	(Russia) Proton-K/DM-2		(Kazakhstan) Baikonur Site 81/23		(Russia) VKS	
25 December; 10:37	(Russia) Kosmos 2394 (GLONASS)	KNITs	Medium Earth	Navigation	In orbit	Operational
25 December; 10:37	(Russia) Kosmos 2395 (GLONASS)	KNITs	Medium Earth	Navigation	In orbit	Operational
25 December; 10:37	(Russia) Kosmos 2396 (GLONASS)	KNITs	Medium Earth	Navigation	In orbit	Operational
29 December; 16:40	(China) Long March 2F		(China) Jiuquan		(China)	
29 December; 16:40	(China) Shenzhou 4	CMSA	Low Earth	Test spacecraft	5 January 2003; 11:16	Successful
29 December; 16:40	(China) Shenzhou spacecraft orbital module	CMSA	Low Earth	Test spacecraft	9 September 2003	Successful
29 December; 23:16	(Russia) Proton-M/Briz-M		(Kazakhstan) Baikonur Site 81/24		(Russia) (United States) International Launch Services	
29 December; 23:16	(Canada) Nimiq 2	Telesat	Geosynchronous	Communications	In orbit	Operational

- ← Jan
- Feb
- Mar
- Apr
- May
- Jun
- Jul
- Aug
- Sep
- Oct
- Nov
- Dec →

== Deep Space Rendezvous ==
Date (GMT)	Spacecraft	Event	Remarks
17 January	Galileo	5th flyby of Io	
2 November	Stardust	Flyby of 5535 Annefrank	
5 November	Galileo	Flyby of Amalthea	
20 December	Nozomi	2nd flyby of the Earth	

== EVAs ==
Start date/time	Duration	End time	Spacecraft	Crew	Function	Remarks
14 January; 20:59	6 hours 3 minutes	15 January; 03:02	Expedition 4 ISS Pirs	(Russia) Yuri Onufriyenko (United States) Carl E. Walz	Moved the cargo boom for the Russian Strela crane from PMA-1 to the exterior of Pirs, installed an amateur radio antenna onto the end of Zvezda.	
25 January; 15:19	5 hours 59 minutes	21:18	Expedition 4 ISS Pirs	(Russia) Yuri Onufriyenko (United States) Daniel W. Bursch	Installed six deflector shields for Zvezda's jet thrusters, installed a second amateur radio antenna, attached four science experiments, and retrieved and replaced a device to measure material from the thrusters.	
20 February; 11:38	5 hours 47 minutes	17:25	Expedition 4 ISS Quest	(United States) Carl E. Walz (United States) Daniel W. Bursch	Tested the Quest airlock, and prepared it for the four spacewalks that will be performed during STS-110.	First Quest-based EVA without a Space Shuttle at the station.
4 March; 06:37	7 hours 1 minute	13:38	STS-109; Columbia	(United States) John M. Grunsfeld (United States) Richard M. Linnehan	Removed the starboard solar array and replaced it with a new, smaller and more powerful third generation solar array. The old array was stowed in the payload bay for return to Earth.	Hubble Space Telescope servicing
5 March; 06:40	7 hours 16 minutes	13:56	STS-109; Columbia	(United States) James H. Newman (United States) Michael J. Massimino	Removed the port solar array and replaced it with a new third generation solar array. The old array was stowed in the payload bay for return to Earth. Removed and replaced the Reaction Wheel Assembly (RWA).	Hubble Space Telescope servicing
6 March; 08:28	6 hours 48 minutes	15:16	STS-109; Columbia	(United States) John M. Grunsfeld (United States) Richard M. Linnehan	The spacewalk was delayed 2 hours by a leak in Grunsfeld's spacesuit. The Power Control Unit (PCU) was removed and stowed for return to Earth. A new, more powerful PCU, sized to match the more productive solar arrays, was installed.	Hubble Space Telescope servicing
7 March; 09:00	7 hours 30 minutes	16:30	STS-109; Columbia	(United States) James H. Newman (United States) Michael J. Massimino	Removed the Faint Object Camera from the aft shroud and installed the Advanced Camera for Surveys in the same location. After stowing the Faint Object Camera in the payload bay for return to Earth, the Electronic Support Module was installed in the aft shroud.	Hubble Space Telescope servicing
8 March; 08:46	7 hours 20 minutes	16:06	STS-109; Columbia	(United States) John M. Grunsfeld (United States) Richard M. Linnehan	Installed an experimental Cryocooler for NICMOS inside the aft shroud of and connected it to the Electronic Support Module installed the day before. Installed the Cooling System Radiator and connected it to the NICMOS.	Hubble Space Telescope servicing
11 April; 14:36	7 hours 48 minutes	22:24	STS-110; ISS Quest	(United States) Steven Smith (United States) Rex J. Walheim	Began installing the S0 Truss onto Destiny, initial power and data connections installed between the station and S0, and installed two forward struts that permanently hold the truss in place.	
13 April; 14:09	7 hours 30 minutes	21:39	STS-110; ISS Quest	(United States) Jerry L. Ross (United States) Lee M.E. Morin	Continued S0 Truss installation, power and data cable connections installed between S0 and the station, and installed two aft struts that permanently hold the truss in place.	
14 April; 13:48	6 hours 27 minutes	20:15	STS-110; ISS Quest	(United States) Steven Smith (United States) Rex J. Walheim	Released the claw that was used in the initial attachment of the S0 Truss, installed connectors that will be used to route power to Canadarm2 when it is on the truss, released launch restraints from the Mobile Transporter, and removed a small thermal cover the Mobile Transporter's radiator.	
16 April; 14:29	6 hours 37 minutes	21:06	STS-110; ISS Quest	(United States) Jerry L. Ross (United States) Lee M.E. Morin	Pivoted the "Airlock Spur", which will be used by spacewalkers in the future as a path from the airlock to the truss, installed handrails onto S0, partially assembled a platform, and installed two floodlights.	
9 June; 15:27	7 hours 14 minutes	22:41	STS-111; ISS Quest	(United States) Franklin Chang-Diaz (France) Philippe Perrin	Attached a Power Data Grapple Fixture to the P6 truss, removed debris panels from the payload bay and attached them to a temporary location on PMA-1, and removed thermal blankets to prepare the Mobile Base System for installation onto the station's Mobile Transporter.	
11 June; 15:20	5 hours	20:20	STS-111; ISS Quest	(United States) Franklin Chang-Diaz (France) Philippe Perrin	Attached Mobile Base System to the Mobile Transporter, attached power, data and video cables from the station to the MBS.	
13 June; 15:16	7 hours 17 minutes	22:33	STS-111; ISS Quest	(United States) Franklin Chang-Diaz (France) Philippe Perrin	Replaced Canadarm2's wrist roll joint, and stowed the old joint in the shuttle's payload bay to be returned to Earth.	
16 August; 09:25	4 hours 23 minutes	13:48	Expedition 5 ISS Pirs	(Russia) Valery Korzun (United States) Peggy Whitson	Installed six micro meteoroid debris panels onto Zvezda.	Whitson became the 6th American and the 7th female spacewalker.
26 August; 05:27	5 hours 21 minutes	10:48	Expedition 5 ISS Pirs	(Russia) Valery Korzun (Russia) Sergei Treshchyov	Installed a frame on the outside of Zarya for spacewalk assembly tasks, installed new samples on a pair of Japanese Space Agency experiments housed on Zvezda, installed devices on Zvezda that would simplify the routing of tethers during future spacewalks, and installed two additional ham radio antennas on Zvezda.	
10 October; 15:21	7 hours 1 minute	20:35	STS-112; ISS Quest	(United States) David Wolf (United Kingdom) / (United States) Piers Sellers	Released launch locks that held the S1 truss radiators in place during launch, attached power, data and fluid lines between the S1 truss and S0, deployed the station's second S-Band communications system, installed the first of two external camera systems, and released launch restraints on the truss' mobile spacewalk workstation, Crew and Equipment Translation Aid (CETA).	
12 October; 14:31	6 hours 4 minutes	20:35	STS-112; ISS Quest	(United States) David Wolf (United Kingdom) / (United States) Piers Sellers	Installed a second camera system, released more radiator launch locks, removed insulation covers on quick-disconnect fittings near the Z1 and P6 junction and to install Spool Positioning Devices, released starboard-side launch restraints on the CETA cart, and attached Ammonia Tank Assembly cables.	
14 October; 14:08	6 hours 36 minutes	20:44	STS-112; ISS Quest	(United States) David Wolf (United Kingdom) / (United States) Piers Sellers	Removed and replaced the Interface Umbilical Assembly on the station's Mobile Transporter, installed two jumpers that will allow ammonia coolant to flow between the S1 and S0 Trusses, released a drag link and stowed it, and installed Spool Positioning Devices (SPD) on ammonia lines.	
26 November; 19:49	6 hours 45 minutes	27 November; 02:34	STS-113; ISS Quest	(United States) Michael Lopez-Alegria (United States) John Herrington	Initial installation of the P1 truss, installed connections between the P1 and the S0 truss, released launch restraints on the CETA cart, installed Spool Positioning Devices (SPDs) onto the station, removed a drag link on P1 that served as a launch restraint, and installed a Wireless video system External Transceiver Assembly onto the Unity node.	
28 November; 18:36	6 hours 10 minutes	29 November; 00:46	STS-113; ISS Quest	(United States) Michael Lopez-Alegria (United States) John Herrington	nstalled fluid jumpers where the S0 and the P1 are attached to each other, removed the P1's starboard keel pin, installed another Wireless video system External Transceiver Assembly onto the P1, and relocated the CETA cart from the P1 to the S1 truss.	
30 November; 19:25	7 hours	1 December; 02:25	STS-113; ISS Quest	(United States) Michael Lopez-Alegria (United States) John Herrington	Installed more Spool Positioning Devices, reconfigured electrical harnesses that route power through the Main Bus Switching Units, and attached Ammonia Tank Assembly lines.	

== Orbital launch statistics ==
=== By country ===
For the purposes of this section, the yearly tally of orbital launches by country assigns each flight to the country of origin of the rocket, not to the launch services provider or the spaceport.

Country	Launches	Successes	Failures	Partial failures
China	5	4	1	0
France	12	11	1	0
India	1	1	0	0
Israel	1	1	0	0
Japan	3	3	0	0
Russia	24	22	2	0
Ukraine	2	2	0	0
United States	17	16	1	0
World	65	60	5	0

=== By rocket ===
- Ariane 4
- Ariane 5
- Atlas II
- Atlas III
- Atlas V
- Delta II
- Delta IV
- H-IIA
- Long March 2
- Long March 4
- Molniya-M
- Soyuz-U
- Soyuz-FG
- Kosmos-3M
- Space Shuttle
- Titan 23G
- Titan IV
- Proton-K
- Proton-M
- Rokot
- Others

==== By family ====
Family	Country	Launches	Successes	Failures	Partial failures	Remarks
Ariane	Europe	12	11	1	0	
Atlas	United States	5	5	0	0	
Delta	United States	4	3	1	0	
H-II	Japan	3	3	0	0	
Kaituozhe	China	1	0	1	0	Maiden flight
Long March	China	4	4	0	0	
Pegasus	United States	1	1	0	0	
PSLV	India	1	1	0	0	
R-7	Russia	9	8	1	0	
R-14	Russia	4	4	0	0	
R-36	Ukraine	1	1	0	0	
Shavit	Israel	1	1	0	0	
Space Shuttle	United States	5	5	0	0	
Titan	United States	2	2	0	0	
Universal Rocket	Russia	11	10	1	0	
Zenit	Ukraine	1	1	0	0	

==== By type ====
Rocket	Country	Family	Launches	Successes	Failures	Partial failures	Remarks
Ariane 4	Europe	Ariane	8	8	0	0	
Ariane 5	Europe	Ariane	4	3	1	0	
Atlas II	United States	Atlas	3	3	0	0	
Atlas III	United States	Atlas	1	1	0	0	
Atlas V	United States	Atlas	1	1	0	0	Maiden flight
Delta II	United States	Delta	3	2	1	0	
Delta IV	United States	Delta	1	1	0	0	Maiden flight
Dnepr	Ukraine	R-36	1	1	0	0	
H-IIA	Japan	H-II	3	3	0	0	
Kaituozhe-1	China	Kaituozhe	1	0	1	0	Maiden flight
Kosmos	Russia	R-14	4	4	0	0	
Long March 2	China	Long March	2	2	0	0	
Long March 4	China	Long March	2	2	0	0	
Molniya	Russia	R-7	2	2	0	0	
Pegasus	United States	Pegasus	1	1	0	0	
PSLV	India	PSLV	1	1	0	0	
Proton	Russia	UR	9	8	1	0	
Shavit	Israel	Shavit	1	1	0	0	
Soyuz	Russia	R-7	7	6	1	0	
Space Shuttle	United States	Space Shuttle	5	5	0	0	
Titan II	United States	Titan	1	1	0	0	
Titan IV	United States	Titan	1	1	0	0	
UR-100	Russia	UR	2	2	0	0	
Zenit	Ukraine	Zenit	1	1	0	0	

==== By configuration ====
Rocket	Country	Type	Launches	Successes	Failures	Partial failures	Remarks
Ariane 4 42P	Europe	Ariane 4	1	1	0	0	Final flight
Ariane 4 42L	Europe	Ariane 4	1	1	0	0	Final flight
Ariane 4 44L	Europe	Ariane 4	6	6	0	0	
Ariane 5G	Europe	Ariane 5	3	3	0	0	
Ariane 5ECA	Europe	Ariane 5	1	0	1	0	Maiden flight
Atlas IIA	United States	Atlas II	2	2	0	0	Final flight
Atlas IIAS	United States	Atlas II	1	1	0	0	
Atlas IIIB	United States	Atlas III	1	1	0	0	Maiden flight
Atlas V 401	United States	Atlas V	1	1	0	0	Maiden flight
Delta II 7425-9.5	United States	Delta II	1	0	1	0	
Delta II 7920-10C	United States	Delta II	1	1	0	0	
Delta II 7920-10L	United States	Delta II	1	1	0	0	
Delta IV-M+ (4,2)	United States	Delta IV	1	1	0	0	Maiden flight
Dnepr	Ukraine	Dnepr	1	1	0	0	
H-IIA 202	Japan	H-IIA	1	1	0	0	
H-IIA 2024	Japan	H-IIA	2	2	0	0	Maiden flight
Kaituozhe-1	China	Kaituozhe-1	1	0	1	0	Maiden flight
Kosmos-3M	Russia	Kosmos	4	4	0	0	
Long March 2F	China	Long March 2	2	2	0	0	
Long March 4B	China	Long March 4	2	2	0	0	
Molniya-M	Russia	Molniya	2	2	0	0	
Pegasus-XL	United States	Pegasus	1	1	0	0	
PSLV-G	India	PSLV	1	1	0	0	
Proton-K / 17S40	Russia	Proton	2	2	0	0	Final flight
Proton-K / Blok DM-2	Russia	Proton	1	1	0	0	
Proton-K / Blok DM-2M	Russia	Proton	5	4	1	0	
Proton-M / Briz-M	Russia	Proton	1	1	0	0	
Rokot / Briz-KM	Russia	UR-100	2	2	0	0	
Shavit 1	Israel	Shavit	1	1	0	0	
Soyuz-U	Russia	Soyuz	5	4	1	0	
Soyuz-FG	Russia	Soyuz	2	2	0	0	
Space Shuttle	United States	Space Shuttle	5	5	0	0	
Titan 23G	United States	Titan II	1	1	0	0	
Titan IVB / Centaur-T	United States	Titan IV	1	1	0	0	
Zenit-3SL	Ukraine	Zenit	1	1	0	0	

=== By spaceport ===
- Jiuquan
- Taiyuan
- Kourou
- Satish Dhawan
- Ocean Odyssey
- Palmachim
- Tanegashima
- Baikonur
- Plesetsk
- Cape Canaveral
- Kennedy
- Vandenberg

Site	Country	Launches	Successes	Failures	Partial failures	Remarks
Baikonur	Kazakhstan	15	14	1	0	
Cape Canaveral	United States	9	8	1	0	
Jiuquan	China	2	2	0	0	
Kennedy	United States	5	5	0	0	
Kourou	France	12	11	1	0	
Ocean Odyssey	(United Nations) International waters	1	1	0	0	
Palmachim	Israel	1	1	0	0	
Plesetsk	Russia	10	9	1	0	
Satish Dhawan	India	1	1	0	0	
Taiyuan	China	3	2	1	0	
Tanegashima	Japan	3	3	0	0	
Vandenberg	United States	3	3	0	0	
Total		65	60	5	0	

=== By orbit ===
- Low Earth
- Low Earth (ISS)
- Low Earth (retrograde)
- Low Earth (SSO)
- Medium Earth
- Molniya
- Geosynchronous
- High Earth

Orbital regime	Launches	Achieved	Not achieved	Accidentally achieved	Remarks
Low Earth / Sun-synchronous	33	31	2	1	Including flights to ISS
Geosynchronous /GTO	27	25	2	0	
Medium Earth / Molniya	3	3	0	0	
High Earth	1	1	0	0	
Heliocentric orbit / Planetary transfer	1	0	1	0	
Total	65	60	5	1	
