= 2004 in spaceflight =

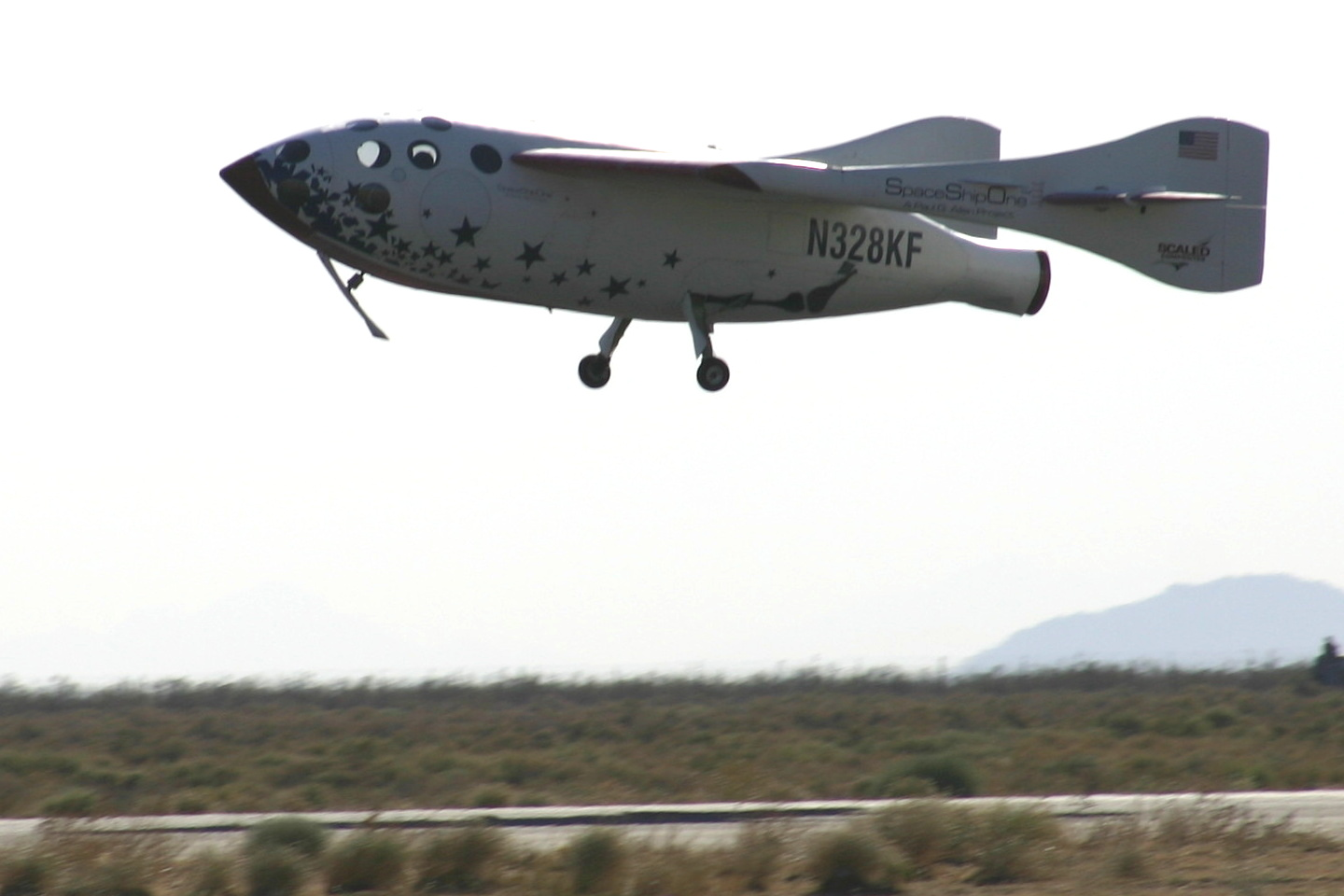
- SpaceShipOne landing after Flight 15P, the first privately funded crewed spaceflight

Orbital launches
- First: 11 January
- Last: 26 December
- Total: 54
- Successes: 50
- Failures: 1
- Partial failures: 3
- Catalogued: 53

Rockets
- Maiden flights: Ariane 5G+ Delta IV Heavy; Soyuz-2.1a (suborbital)
- Retirements: Ariane 5G+ Atlas IIAS; Atlas IIIA; Atlas V 521

Crewed flights
- Orbital: 2
- Suborbital: 3
- Total travellers: 8

2004 in spaceflight

This article outlines notable events occurring in 2004 in spaceflight, including major launches and EVAs.

== First privately funded human spaceflight ==
Flight 15P of SpaceShipOne (X0) was the first privately funded human spaceflight. It took place on June 21, 2004. It was the fourth powered test flight of the Tier One program, with the previous three test flights reaching much lower altitudes. The flight carried only its pilot, Mike Melvill, who thus became the first non-governmental astronaut.

== First Delta IV Heavy ==
Its maiden flight on December 21, 2004 carried a boilerplate payload and ended in partial failure when cavitation in liquid-oxygen lines caused premature shutdown of the engines, leaving the test article in a lower-than-intended orbit. The rocket achieved its first fully successful operational flight in 2007 with the launch of the DSP-23 satellite, and subsequently deployed several reconnaissance satellites for the National Reconnaissance Office (NRO).

== Launches ==
- ← Jan
- Feb
- Mar
- Apr
- May
- Jun
- Jul
- Aug
- Sep
- Oct
- Nov
- Dec →

Date and time (UTC)	Rocket	Flight number	Launch site		LSP	
Date and time (UTC)	Payload (⚀ = CubeSat)	Operator	Orbit	Function	Decay (UTC)	Outcome
Date and time (UTC)	Remarks					
=== January ===
11 January; 04:13	(Ukraine) Zenit-3SL		(Norway) Ocean Odyssey		(United Nations) Sea Launch	
11 January; 04:13	Estrela do Sul 1 (Telstar 14)		Geosynchronous	Communications	In orbit	Operational; Partial spacecraft failure
11 January; 04:13	One of the payload's solar panels did not deploy, and several transponders were disabled. Its replacement, Telstar 14R, launched in 2011, suffered a similar issue.					
29 January; 11:58	(Russia) Soyuz-U		(Kazakhstan) Baikonur Site 1/5		(Russia) Roskosmos	
29 January; 11:58	(Russia) Progress M1-11	Roskosmos	Low Earth (ISS)	Logistics	3 June	Successful
29 January; 11:58	ISS flight 13P					
=== February ===
5 February; 23:46	(United States) Atlas IIAS		(United States) Cape Canaveral SLC-36A		(Russia) (United States) International Launch Services	
5 February; 23:46	(United States) AMC-10	SES Americom	Geosynchronous	Communications	In orbit	Operational
14 February; 18:50	(United States) Titan IVB (402)/IUS		(United States) Cape Canaveral SLC-40		(United States) Lockheed Martin	
14 February; 18:50	(United States) DSP-22	US Air Force	Geosynchronous	Missile warning	In orbit	Operational
18 February; 07:05	(Russia) Molniya-M		(Russia) Plesetsk Site 16/2		(Russia) VKS	
18 February; 07:05	(Russia) Kosmos 2405		Molniya	Missile warning	In orbit	Operational
=== March ===
2 March; 07:17	(France) Ariane 5G+		(France) Kourou ELA-3		(France) Arianespace	
2 March; 07:17	Rosetta	ESA	Heliocentric	Comet probe	30 September 2016	Successful
2 March; 07:17	Philae	ESA	Heliocentric	Comet lander	9 July 2015	Successful
2 March; 07:17	Maiden flight of Ariane 5G+ Studied the comet 67P/Churyumov-Gerasimenko and asteroids 2867 Šteins and 21 Lutetia					
13 March; 05:40	(United States) Atlas IIIA		(United States) Cape Canaveral SLC-36B		(Russia) (United States) International Launch Services	
13 March; 05:40	MBSat	MBSAT	Geosynchronous	Communications	In orbit	Operational
13 March; 05:40	Final flight of Atlas IIIA					
15 March; 23:06	(Russia) Proton-M/Briz-M		(Kazakhstan) Baikonur Site 81/24		(Russia) (United States) International Launch Services	
15 March; 23:06	(France) Eutelsat W3A	Eutelsat	Geosynchronous	Communications	In orbit	Operational
20 March; 17:53	(United States) Delta II 7925		(United States) Cape Canaveral SLC-17B		(United States) Boeing IDS	
20 March; 17:53	(United States) GPS IIR-11	US Air Force	Medium Earth	Navigation	In orbit	Operational
27 March; 03:30	(Russia) Proton-K/DM-2		(Kazakhstan) Baikonur Site 81/23		(Russia) VKS	
27 March; 03:30	(Russia) Kosmos 2406 (Raduga-1)	Russian military	Geosynchronous	Communications	In orbit	Operational
=== April ===
16 April; 00:45	(United States) Atlas IIAS		(United States) Cape Canaveral SLC-36A		(Russia) (United States) International Launch Services	
16 April; 00:45	(Japan) Superbird 6	SCC	Geosynchronous	Communications	In orbit	Operational
18 April; 15:59	(China) Long March 2C		(China) Jiuquan		(China)	
18 April; 15:59	(China) Tansuo 1 (Shiyan 1)	University of Harbin	Low Earth	Land resource mapping	In orbit	Operational
18 April; 15:59	(China) Naxing 1	Tsinghua University	Low Earth	Earth imaging	In orbit	Operational
19 April; 03:19	(Russia) Soyuz-FG		(Kazakhstan) Baikonur Site 1/5		(Russia) Roskosmos	
19 April; 03:19	(Russia) Soyuz TMA-4	Roskosmos	Low Earth (ISS)	ISS Expedition 9	24 October	Successful
19 April; 03:19	Crewed orbital flight with 3 cosmonauts					
20 April; 16:57	(United States) Delta II 7920		(United States) Vandenberg SLC-2W		(United States) Boeing IDS	
20 April; 16:57	(United States) Gravity Probe B	NASA	Low Earth	Test Einstein's Theory of relativity	In orbit	Successful
26 April; 20:37	(Russia) Proton-K/DM-2M		(Kazakhstan) Baikonur Site 200/39			
26 April; 20:37	(Russia) Ekspress AM11	RSCC	Geosynchronous	Communications	In orbit	Decommissioned
=== May ===
4 May; 12:42	(Ukraine) Zenit-3SL		(Norway) Ocean Odyssey		(United Nations) Sea Launch	
4 May; 12:42	(United States) DirecTV-7S	DirecTV	Geosynchronous	Communications	In orbit	Operational
17 May; 11:12	(United States) GoFast		(United States) Black Rock Desert, Nevada, USA		(United States) CSXT	
17 May; 11:12	(United States)	CSXT	Suborbital	Test spacecraft	17 May	Successful
17 May; 11:12	First amateur space launch (apogee: 116 km)					
19 May; 22:22	(United States) Atlas IIAS		(United States) Cape Canaveral SLC-36B		(Russia) (United States) International Launch Services	
19 May; 22:22	(United States) AMC-11	SES Americom	Geosynchronous	Communications	In orbit	Operational
20 May; 17:47	(United States) Taurus 3120		(United States) Vandenberg LC-576E		(United States) Orbital Sciences	
20 May; 17:47	(Taiwan) FORMOSAT-2 (ROCSAT-2)	NSPO	Low Earth	Earth imaging	In orbit	Operational
25 May; 12:34	(Russia) Soyuz-U		(Kazakhstan) Baikonur Site 1/5		(Russia) Roskosmos	
25 May; 12:34	(Russia) Progress M-49	Roskosmos	Low Earth (ISS)	Logistics	30 July	Successful
25 May; 12:34	ISS flight 14P					
28 May; 06:00	(Ukraine) Tsyklon-2		(Kazakhstan) Baikonur Site 90/20		(Russia) VKS	
28 May; 06:00	(Russia) Kosmos 2405	VMF	Low Earth	Reconnaissance	In orbit	Operational
=== June ===
10 June; 01:28	(Ukraine) Zenit-2		(Kazakhstan) Baikonur Site 45/1		(Russia) VKS	
10 June; 01:28	(Russia) Kosmos 2406	VKS	Low Earth	Signals intelligence	In orbit	Operational
16 June; 22:27	(Russia) Proton-M/Briz-M		(Kazakhstan) Baikonur Site 200/39		(Russia) (United States) International Launch Services	
16 June; 22:27	(United Nations) Intelsat 10-02	Intelsat	Geosynchronous	Communications	In orbit	Operational
21 June; 14:47	(United States) SpaceShipOne		(United States) White Knight, Mojave Spaceport		(United States) Scaled Composites	
21 June; 14:47	(United States) Flight 15P	Scaled Composites	Suborbital	Test spacecraft	21 June	Successful
21 June; 14:47	Crewed sub-orbital flight with 1 astronaut (Mike Melvill); First privately funded crewed spaceflight Maiden flight of SpaceShipOne as a spacecraft					
23 June; 22:54	(United States) Delta II 7925		(United States) Cape Canaveral SLC-17B		(United States) Boeing IDS	
23 June; 22:54	(United States) GPS IIR-12	US Air Force	Medium Earth	Navigation	In orbit	Operational
29 June; 03:59	(Ukraine) Zenit-3SL		(Norway) Ocean Odyssey		(United Nations) Sea Launch	
29 June; 03:59	Telstar 18	Loral/Apstar	Intended: Geosynchronous; Achieved: Medium Earth	Communications	In orbit	Partial launch failure
29 June; 03:59	Premature cutout left payload in useless orbit					
29 June; 06:30	(Ukraine) Dnepr		(Kazakhstan) Baikonur Site 109/95		(Russia) ISC Kosmotras	
29 June; 06:30	LatinSat D (AprizeSat 2)	Aprize	Low Earth	Communications	In orbit	Operational
29 June; 06:30	(France) Demeter	CNES	Low Earth	Seismology	In orbit	Operational
29 June; 06:30	(Saudi Arabia) SaudiComsat 1	RSRI	Low Earth	Communications	In orbit	Operational
29 June; 06:30	(Saudi Arabia) SaudiComsat 2	RSRI	Low Earth	Communications	In orbit	Operational
29 June; 06:30	(Saudi Arabia) SaudiSat 2	RSRI	Low Earth	Earth imaging	In orbit	Operational
29 June; 06:30	LatinSat C (AprizeSat 1)	Aprize	Low Earth	Communications	In orbit	Operational
29 June; 06:30	(Italy) Unisat 3	Sapienza University of Rome	Low Earth	Technology development	In orbit	Operational
29 June; 06:30	(United States) Amsat Echo	AMSAT	Low Earth	Communications	In orbit	Operational
=== July ===
15 July; 10:02	(United States) Delta II 7920-10L		(United States) Vandenberg SLC-2W		(United States) Boeing IDS	
15 July; 10:02	(United States) Aura	NASA	Sun-synchronous (A-train)	Atmospheric research	In orbit	Operational
18 July; 00:44	(France) Ariane 5G+		(France) Kourou ELA-3		(France) Arianespace	
18 July; 00:44	(Canada) Anik F2	Telesat	Geosynchronous	Communications	In orbit	Operational
22 July; 17:46	(Russia) Kosmos-3M		(Russia) Plesetsk Site 132/1		(Russia) VKS	
22 July; 17:46	(Russia) Kosmos 2409 (Parus)		Low Earth	Navigation	In orbit	Operational
25 July; 07:05	(China) Long March 2C		(China) Taiyuan		(China)	
25 July; 07:05	(China) Tan Ce 2	CASC/ESA	High Earth (High-eccentricity)	Magnetosphere research	In orbit	Operational
=== August ===
3 August; 07:18	(United States) Delta II 7925H		(United States) Cape Canaveral SLC-17B		(United States) Boeing IDS	
3 August; 07:18	(United States) MESSENGER	NASA	Mercurian	Mercury probe	30 April 2015	Successful
3 August; 07:18	Became the first spacecraft to orbit Mercury on 4 April 2011					
4 August; 22:32	(Russia) Proton-M/Briz-M		(Kazakhstan) Baikonur Site 200/39		(Russia) (United States) International Launch Services	
4 August; 22:32	(Spain) Amazonas	Hispasat	Geosynchronous	Communications	In orbit	Operational
11 August; 05:03	(Russia) Soyuz-U		(Kazakhstan) Baikonur Site 1/5		(Russia) Roskosmos	
11 August; 05:03	(Russia) Progress M-50	Roskosmos	Low Earth (ISS)	Logistics	22 December	Successful
11 August; 05:03	ISS flight 15P					
29 August; 07:50	(China) Long March 2C		(China) Jiuquan		(China)	
29 August; 07:50	(China) FSW-19 (FSW-2)		Geosynchronous	Earth imaging	7 November; 23:55	Successful
31 August; 23:17	(United States) Atlas IIAS		(United States) Cape Canaveral SLC-36A		(Russia) (United States) International Launch Services	
31 August; 23:17	(United States) SDS-3-4 (USA-179)	NRO	Geosynchronous	Classified	In orbit	Operational
31 August; 23:17	Final flight of Atlas IIAS					
=== September ===
6 September; 10:35	(Israel) Shavit-1		(Israel) Palmachim		(Israel)	
6 September; 10:35	(Israel) Ofeq-6		Intended: Low Earth (retrograde)	Reconnaissance	T+270	Launch failure
6 September; 10:35	Loss of control during third stage burn					
8 September; 23:14	(China) Long March 4B		(China) Taiyuan		(China)	
8 September; 23:14	(China) Shijian 6-01A	CASC	Low Earth	Technology demonstration	In orbit	Operational
8 September; 23:14	(China) Shijian 6-01B	CASC	Low Earth	Technology demonstration	In orbit	Operational
20 September; 10:31	(India) GSLV		(India) Satish Dhawan FLP		(India) ISRO	
20 September; 10:31	(India) EDUSAT (GSAT-3)	ISRO	Geosynchronous	Communications	In orbit	Operational
23 September; 15:07	(Russia) Kosmos-3M		(Russia) Plesetsk Site 132/1		(Russia) VKS	
23 September; 15:07	(Russia) Kosmos 2408	Russian military	Low Earth	Communications	In orbit	Operational
23 September; 15:07	(Russia) Kosmos 2409	Russian military	Low Earth	Communications	In orbit	Operational
24 September; 16:50	(Russia) Soyuz-U		(Russia) Plestsk Site 16/2		(Russia) VKS	
24 September; 16:50	(Russia) Kosmos 2410	Russian military	Low Earth	Reconnaissance	9 January 2005	Failure
24 September; 16:50	Re-entry capsule could not be located					
27 September; 08:00	(China) Long March 2D		(China) Jiuquan		(China)	
27 September; 08:00	(China) FSW-20 (FSW-3)		Low Earth	Earth imaging	In orbit	Operational
29 September; 15:12	(United States) SpaceShipOne		(United States) White Knight, Mojave Spaceport		(United States) Scaled Composites	
29 September; 15:12	(United States) Flight 16P	Scaled Composites	Suborbital	Ansari X Prize qualification	29 September	Successful
29 September; 15:12	Crewed sub-orbital flight with 1 astronaut (Mike Melvill)					
=== October ===
4 October; 14:49	(United States) SpaceShipOne		(United States) White Knight, Mojave Spaceport		(United States) Scaled Composites	
4 October; 14:49	(United States) Flight 17P	Scaled Composites	Suborbital	Ansari X Prize qualification	4 October	Successful
4 October; 14:49	Crewed sub-orbital flight with 1 astronaut (Brian Binnie); Final flight of SpaceShipOne					
14 October; 03:06	(Russia) Soyuz-FG		(Kazakhstan) Baikonur Site 1/5		(Russia) Roskosmos	
14 October; 03:06	(Russia) Soyuz TMA-5	Roskosmos	Low Earth (ISS)	ISS Expedition 10	24 April 2005	Successful
14 October; 03:06	Crewed orbital flight with 3 cosmonauts					
14 October; 21:23	(Russia) Proton-M/Briz-M		(Kazakhstan) Baikonur Site 200/39		(Russia) (United States) International Launch Services	
14 October; 21:23	(United States) AMC-15	SES Americom	Geosynchronous	Communications	In orbit	Operational
19 October; 01:20	(China) Long March 3A		(China) Xichang		(China)	
19 October; 01:20	(China) Feng Yun 2C		Geosynchronous	Weather satellite	In orbit	Operational
29 October; 22:11	(Russia) Proton-K/DM-2M		(Kazakhstan) Baikonur Site 200/39		(Russia)	
29 October; 22:11	(Russia) Ekspress AM-1	RSCC	Geosynchronous	Communications	In orbit	Operational
=== November ===
6 November; 03:10	(China) Long March 4B		(China) Taiyuan		(China)	
6 November; 03:10	(China) Zi Yuan 2C		Geosynchronous	Earth imaging	In orbit	Operational
6 November; 05:39	(United States) Delta II 7925		(United States) Cape Canaveral SLC-17B		(United States) Boeing IDS	
6 November; 05:39	(United States) GPS IIR-13	US Air Force	Medium Earth	Navigation	In orbit	Operational
8 November; 18:30	(Russia) Soyuz-2.1a		(Russia) Plesetsk Site 43/4		(Russia)	
8 November; 18:30	(Russia) Zenit-8 (Obilik)		Suborbital	Test carrier rocket	8 November	Successful
8 November; 18:30	Maiden flight of Soyuz-2.1a					
18 November; 10:45	(China) Long March 2C		(China) Xichang		(China)	
18 November; 10:45	(China) Shiyan 2		Low Earth	Earth observation	In orbit	Operational
20 November; 17:16	(United States) Delta II 7320		(United States) Cape Canaveral SLC-17A		(United States) Boeing IDS	
20 November; 17:16	(United States) Swift	NASA	Low Earth	Gamma-ray research	In orbit	Operational
=== December ===
14 December	Taiwan Sounding Rocket	Sounding Rocket IV	(Taiwan) Jiu Peng Air Base		(Taiwan) NSPO	
14 December	(Taiwan) Airglow photometer, GPS receiver	NSPO	Suborbital	Airglow research, technology test	14 December	Successful
14 December	Apogee: ~280 km (174 mi)					
17 December; 12:07	(United States) Atlas V 521		(United States) Cape Canaveral SLC-41		(Russia) (United States) International Launch Services	
17 December; 12:07	(United States) AMC-16	SES Americom	Geosynchronous	Communications	In orbit	Operational
18 December; 16:26	(France) Ariane 5G+		(France) Kourou ELA-3		(France) Arianespace	
18 December; 16:26	(France) Helios 2A	DGA	Low Earth	Reconnaissance	In orbit	Operational
18 December; 16:26	(Spain) Nanosat 01	INTA	Low Earth	Technology demonstration	In orbit	Operational
18 December; 16:26	(France) Essaim 1	DGA	Low Earth	ELINT	In orbit	Operational
18 December; 16:26	(France) Essaim 2	DGA	Low Earth	ELINT	In orbit	Operational
18 December; 16:26	(France) Essaim 3	DGA	Low Earth	ELINT	In orbit	Operational
18 December; 16:26	(France) Essaim 4	DGA	Low Earth	ELINT	In orbit	Operational
18 December; 16:26	(France) Parasol	CNES	Sun-synchronous (A-train)	Aeronomy	In orbit	Operational
18 December; 16:26	Final flight of Ariane 5G+					
21 December; 21:50	(United States) Delta IV Heavy 9250H		(United States) Cape Canaveral SLC-37B		(United States) Boeing IDS	
21 December; 21:50	(United States) DemoSat (USA-181)	US Air Force	Intended: Subsynchronous; Actual: Medium Earth	Test launch vehicle	In orbit	Partial launch failure
21 December; 21:50	(United States) Sparkie (3CSat1)	US Air Force	Low Earth	Cloud imaging	22 December	Satellite failure
21 December; 21:50	(United States) Ralphie (3CSat2)	US Air Force	Low Earth	Cloud imaging	22 December	Satellite failure
21 December; 21:50	Maiden flight of Delta IV Heavy; Premature cut-off of second stage (burn one) left all payloads in wrong orbits. Both nanosats failed to contact ground after separation					
22 December	(Russia) R-36		(Russia) Dombarovskiy		(Russia) RVSN	
22 December	(Russia) Dummy warhead	RVSN	Suborbital	Missile test	22 December	Successful
23 December; 22:19	(Russia) Soyuz-U		(Kazakhstan) Baikonur Site 1/5		(Russia) Roskomsos	
23 December; 22:19	(Russia) Progress M-51	Roskosmos	Low Earth (ISS)	Logistics	9 March 2005	Successful
23 December; 22:19	ISS flight 16P					
24 December; 11:20	(Ukraine) Tsyklon-3		(Russia) Plesetsk Site 32/2		(Russia) VKS	
24 December; 11:20	(Ukraine) Sich-1M	NKAU	Low Earth	Earth observation	In orbit	Partial launch failure
24 December; 11:20	(Ukraine) MK-1TS	NKAU	Low Earth	Earth observation		Partial launch failure
24 December; 11:20	Both satellites placed into incorrect orbits due to premature third stage cutoff					
26 December; 13:53	(Russia) Proton-K/DM-2		(Kazakhstan) Baikonur Site 200/39		(Russia) VKS	
26 December; 13:53	(Russia) Kosmos 2411 (GLONASS)	KNITs	Medium Earth	Navigation	In orbit	Operational
26 December; 13:53	(Russia) Kosmos 2412 (GLONASS)	KNITs	Medium Earth	Navigation	In orbit	Operational
26 December; 13:53	(Russia) Kosmos 2413 (GLONASS)	KNITs	Medium Earth	Navigation	In orbit	Operational

- ← Jan
- Feb
- Mar
- Apr
- May
- Jun
- Jul
- Aug
- Sep
- Oct
- Nov
- Dec →

== Deep Space Rendezvous ==
Date (GMT)	Spacecraft	Event	Remarks
2 January	Stardust	Flyby of 81P/Wild (Wild 2)	Dust collection (samples returned to Earth in 2006)
3 January	Spirit	Landing on Mars	Gusev Crater
24 January	Opportunity	Landing on Mars	Meridiani Planum
4 February	Ulysses	2nd flyby of Jupiter	
19 May	Hayabusa	Flyby of the Earth	
11 June	Cassini	Flyby of Phoebe	Closest approach: 2,000 kilometres (1,200 mi)
1 July	Cassini	First orbiter of Saturn	Saturnian orbit injection
8 September	Genesis	Capsule crash-landing on Earth	0.4 milligrams (0.0062 gr) of solar sample aboard
26 October	Cassini	Flyby of Titan	Closest approach: 1,200 kilometres (750 mi)
15 November	SMART-1	Selenocentric orbit injection	First European Lunar mission
13 December	Cassini	Flyby of Titan	Closest approach: 2,336 kilometres (1,452 mi)

== EVAs ==
Start date/time	Duration	End time	Spacecraft	Crew	Function	Remarks
26 February; 21:17	3 hours 55 minutes	27 February; 01:12	Expedition 8 ISS Pirs	(United Kingdom) / (United States) Michael Foale (Russia) Alexander Kaleri	Replaced microgravity experiment cassette containers, attached the Russian experiment Matryoshka to Zvezda, and removed a JAXA micro-meteor impact experiment.	Reduced duration due a cooling system malfunction in Kaleri's spacesuit.
24 June; 21:56	14 minutes	22:10	Expedition 9 ISS Pirs	(Russia) Gennady Padalka (United States) Michael Fincke	Spacewalk cut short due to a pressure problem in Fincke's prime oxygen tank in his spacesuit.	Rescheduled for 30 June.
30 June; 21:19	5 hours 40 minutes	1 July; 02:59	Expedition 9 ISS Pirs	(Russia) Gennady Padalka (United States) Michael Fincke	Replaced a Remote Power Controller (RPC) that failed in late April, causing a loss of power in Control Moment Gyroscope No. 2 (CMG 2).	
3 August; 06:58	4 hours 30 minutes	11:28	Expedition 9 ISS Pirs	(Russia) Gennady Padalka (United States) Michael Fincke	Removed laser retro reflectors from the Zvezda assembly compartment, and installed three updated laser retro reflectors and one internal videometer target in preparation for the Automated Transfer Vehicle (ATV). Installed two antennas, and removed and replaced Kromka experiment packages.	
3 September; 16:43	5 hours 20 minutes	22:04	Expedition 9 ISS Pirs	(Russia) Gennady Padalka (United States) Michael Fincke	Replaced the Zarya Control Module flow control panel, installed four safety tether fairleads on Zarya's handrails, installed three communications antennas, and removed covers from the antennas.	

== Orbital launch statistics ==
=== By country ===
For the purposes of this section, the yearly tally of orbital launches by country assigns each flight to the country of origin of the rocket, not to the launch services provider or the spaceport.

Country	Launches	Successes	Failures	Partial failures
China	8	8	0	0
France	3	3	0	0
India	1	1	0	0
Israel	1	0	1	0
Russia	18	18	0	0
Ukraine	7	5	0	2
United States	16	15	0	1
World	54	50	1	3

=== By rocket ===
- Ariane 5
- Atlas II
- Atlas III
- Atlas V
- Delta II
- Delta IV Heavy
- Long March 2
- Long March 3
- Long March 4
- Molniya-M
- Soyuz-U
- Soyuz-FG
- Kosmos-3M
- Dnepr
- Tsyklon-2
- Tsyklon-3
- Proton-K
- Proton-M
- Zenit-2
- Zenit-3SL
- Others

==== By family ====
Family	Country	Launches	Successes	Failures	Partial failures	Remarks
Ariane	France	3	3	0	0	
Atlas	United States	6	6	0	0	
Delta	United States	8	7	0	1	
GSLV	India	1	1	0	0	
Long March	China	8	8	0	0	
Minotaur	United States	1	1	0	0	
R-7	Russia	8	8	0	0	
R-14	Russia	2	2	0	0	
R-36	Ukraine	3	2	0	1	
Shavit	Israel	1	0	1	0	
Titan	United States	1	1	0	0	
Universal Rocket	Russia	8	8	0	0	
Zenit	Ukraine	4	3	0	1	

==== By type ====
Rocket	Country	Family	Launches	Successes	Failures	Partial failures	Remarks
Ariane 5	France	Ariane	3	3	0	0	
Atlas II	United States	Atlas	4	4	0	0	Final flight
Atlas III	United States	Atlas	1	1	0	0	
Atlas V	United States	Atlas	1	1	0	0	
Delta II	United States	Delta	7	7	0	0	
Delta IV	United States	Delta	1	0	0	1	
Dnepr	Ukraine	R-36	1	1	0	0	
GSLV	India	GSLV	1	1	0	0	
Kosmos	Russia	R-14	2	2	0	0	
Long March 2	China	Long March	5	5	0	0	
Long March 3	China	Long March	1	1	0	0	
Long March 4	China	Long March	2	2	0	0	
Molniya-M	Russia	R-7	1	1	0	0	
Proton-K	Russia	Universal Rocket	4	4	0	0	
Proton-M	Russia	Universal Rocket	4	4	0	0	
Shavit	Israel	Shavit	1	0	1	0	
Soyuz-U	Russia	R-7	5	5	0	0	
Soyuz-FG	Russia	R-7	2	2	0	0	
Taurus	United States	Minotaur	1	1	0	0	
Titan IV	United States	Titan	1	1	0	0	
Tsyklon	Ukraine	R-36	2	1	0	1	
Zenit	Ukraine	Zenit	4	3	0	1	

==== By configuration ====
Rocket	Country	Type	Launches	Successes	Failures	Partial failures	Remarks
Ariane 5G+	France	Ariane 5	3	3	0	0	Maiden and final flights
Atlas IIAS	United States	Atlas II	4	4	0	0	Final flight
Atlas IIIA	United States	Atlas III	1	1	0	0	Final flight
Atlas V 521	United States	Atlas V	1	1	0	0	Final flight
Delta II 7320	United States	Delta II	1	1	0	0	
Delta II 7920	United States	Delta II	1	1	0	0	
Delta II 7920-10L	United States	Delta II	1	1	0	0	
Delta II 7925	United States	Delta II	3	3	0	0	
Delta II 7925H	United States	Delta II	1	1	0	0	
Delta IV Heavy	United States	Delta IV	1	0	0	1	Maiden flight
Dnepr	Ukraine	Dnepr	1	1	0	0	
GSLV Mk I	India	GSLV	1	1	0	0	
Kosmos-3M	Russia	Kosmos	2	2	0	0	
Long March 2C	China	Long March 2	4	4	0	0	
Long March 2D	China	Long March 2	1	1	0	0	
Long March 3A	China	Long March 3	1	1	0	0	
Long March 4B	China	Long March 4	2	2	0	0	
Molniya-M	Russia	Molniya-M	1	1	0	0	
Proton-K / DM-2	Russia	Proton-K	4	4	0	0	
Proton-M / Briz-M	Russia	Proton-M	4	4	0	0	
Shavit-1	Israel	Shavit	1	0	1	0	
Soyuz-U	Russia	Soyuz-U	5	5	0	0	
Soyuz-FG	Russia	Soyuz-FG	2	2	0	0	
Taurus 3120	United States	Taurus	1	1	0	0	
Titan IV-B (402B) / IUS	United States	Titan IV	1	1	0	0	
Tsyklon-2	Ukraine	Tsyklon	1	1	0	0	
Tsyklon-3	Ukraine	Tsyklon	1	0	0	1	
Zenit-2	Ukraine	Zenit	1	1	0	0	
Zenit-3SL	Ukraine	Zenit	3	2	0	1	

=== By spaceport ===
- Jiuquan
- Taiyuna
- Xichang
- Kourou
- Satish Dhawan
- Ocean Odyssey
- Palmachim
- Baikonur
- Plesetsk
- Cape Canaveral
- Kennedy
- Vandenberg

Site	Country	Launches	Successes	Failures	Partial failures	Remarks
Baikonur	Kazakhstan	17	17	0	0	
Cape Canaveral	United States	13	12	0	1	
Jiuquan	China	3	3	0	0	
Kourou	France	3	3	0	0	
Ocean Odyssey	(United Nations) International	3	2	0	1	
Palmachim	Israel	1	0	1	0	
Plesetsk	Russia	5	4	0	1	
Satish Dhawan	India	1	1	0	0	
Taiyuan	China	3	3	0	0	
Vandenberg	United States	3	3	0	0	
Xichang	China	2	2	0	0	
Total		54	50	1	3	

=== By orbit ===
- Transatmospheric
- Low Earth
- Low Earth (ISS)
- Low Earth (SSO)
- Low Earth (retrograde)
- Medium Earth
- Geosychronous
  (transfer)
- Inclined GSO
- High Earth
- Heliocentric

Orbital regime	Launches	Successes	Failures	Accidentally achieved	Remarks
Transatmospheric	0	0	0	0	
Low Earth	23	22	1	0	6 to ISS
Medium Earth / Molniya	5	5	0	2	
Geosynchronous / GTO	23	21	2	0	
High Earth / Lunar transfer	1	1	0	0	
Heliocentric / Planetary transfer	2	2	0	0	
Total	54	51	3	2	
