= Kalpana-1 =

Meteorological satellite

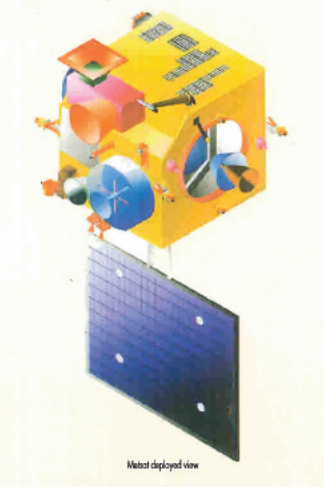
- Kalpana-1 deployed
- Mission type: Weather
- Operator: ISRO
- COSPAR ID: 2002-043A
- SATCAT no.: 27525
- Website: Kalpana-1 on ISRO Web-site
- Mission duration: Planned: 7 years Achieved: 15 years

Spacecraft properties
- Bus: I-1000 Bus
- Manufacturer: ISRO Satellite Center; Space Applications Centre
- Launch mass: 1,060 kilograms (2,340 lb)
- Dry mass: 498 kilograms (1,098 lb)
- Power: 550 watts

Start of mission
- Launch date: 12 September 2002, 10:24:00 UTC
- Rocket: PSLV-C4
- Launch site: SHAR, Satish Dhawan FLP

End of mission
- Deactivated: September 2017

Orbital parameters
- Reference system: Geocentric
- Regime: Geostationary
- Longitude: 74° East
- Eccentricity: 0.0
- Perigee altitude: 35,771 kilometres (22,227 mi)
- Apogee altitude: 35,801 kilometres (22,246 mi)
- Inclination: 0.48 degrees
- Period: 1436.06 minutes
- Epoch: 25 September 2002

Instruments
- VHRR

Kalpana-1 was the first dedicated meteorological satellite launched by the Indian Space Research Organisation using Polar Satellite Launch Vehicle on 12 September 2002. The satellite is three-axis stabilized and is powered by solar panels, getting up to 550 watts (0.74 hp) of power. The METSAT bus was used as the basis for the Chandrayaan lunar orbiter mission of 2008.

== History ==
Originally known as MetSat-1, the satellite was the first launched by the PSLV-C4 into the Geostationary orbit. On February 5, 2003, it was renamed to Kalpana-1 by the Indian Prime Minister Atal Bihari Vajpayee in memory of Kalpana Chawla—an Indian born NASA astronaut who perished in the Space Shuttle Columbia disaster. The satellite features a Very High Resolution scanning Radiometer (VHRR), for three-band images (visible, infrared, and thermal infrared) with a resolution of 2 km × 2 km (1.2 mi × 1.2 mi), and a Data Relay Transponder (DRT) payload to provide data to weather terrestrial platforms. Its mission were to collect data in layer of clouds, water vapor, and temperature of the atmosphere and to establish a small satellite I-1000 bus system which can meet the exclusive service requirements of a meteorological payload for earth imageries Kalpana-1 went out of service in mid-2018.

The satellite used a new planar array antenna to transmit its VHRR and Data Relay Transponder (DRT) data. Its instrument data were acquired by the Meteorological Utilization Centre in New Delhi, and its images and products were made available in near real time through the websites of the India Meteorological Department (IMD) and ISRO's MOSDAC. Kalpana-1 and INSAT-3A were both decommissioned because they ran out of fuel, and the IMD says they were discontinued in September 2016 (INSAT-3A) and September 2017 (Kalpana-1). The experience gained from them led to a series of newer meteorological satellites and associated software, such as INSAT-3D, which provide continuous weather forecasting for the country.

== VHRR scanning radiometer ==
The three band images are:

- Visible
- Thermal infrared
- Water vapour infrared

== See also ==
- 2002 in spaceflight
- List of Indian satellites
