= Tiankun-1 =

Chinese technology demonstration satellite

- Names: TK-1
- Mission type: Technology demonstration
- Operator: CASIC
- COSPAR ID: 2017-012A
- SATCAT no.: 42061
- Mission duration: 6 years, 4 months and 5 days (elapsed)

Spacecraft properties
- Manufacturer: CASIC
- Launch mass: 50 kg (110 lb)

Start of mission
- Launch date: March 2, 2017
- Rocket: Kaituozhe-2
- Launch site: Jiuquan Satellite Launch Center
- Contractor: CASIC

End of mission
- Decay date: 7 July 2023

Orbital parameters
- Reference system: Geocentric
- Regime: Low Earth
- Semi-major axis: 6,766 km (4,204 mi)
- Perigee altitude: 373.3 km (232.0 mi)
- Apogee altitude: 417.3 km (259.3 mi)
- Inclination: 97.2°
- Period: 92.3 minutes

Tiankun-1 (also known as TK-1) is a Chinese experimental technology demonstration satellite developed, operated, and launched by China Aerospace Science and Industry Corporation (CASIC). It was launched on March 2, 2017, and is designed in order to test its satellite bus, as well as small satellite operations. The satellite decayed from orbit on 7 July 2023.

== Design ==
Tiankun-1 is a small satellite designed to test technologies meant for satellites of such sizes, as well as experiment with the operation of small satellites. With its small launch vehicles, China hopes to be able to get a share in the international small satellite launch market.

Tiankun-1's mission is to test out its satellite bus and performance in orbit. It would also be used for testing remote sensing and telecommunications technologies, as well as test out minisatellite-based experiments and operations. It is the first spacecraft to be developed by the CASIC as part of its plans to expand its commercial space plans.

== Launch ==
Tiankun-1 was launched on board a Kaituozhe-2 rocket, which is a then-new small launch vehicle. It launched from Jiuquan Satellite Launch Center on March 2, 2017, at 07:53 CST (23:53 UTC) into a polar orbit. It was the Kaituozhe-2's first launch, and its first successful one. It was launched to a low Earth orbit with a perigee of 373.3 km (232.0 mi), an apogee of 417.3 km (259.3 mi) and an inclination of 97.2°.
