= AMC-15 (satellite) =

American telecommunications satellite

- Names: GE-15
- Mission type: Communications
- Operator: SES Americom / EchoStar
- COSPAR ID: 2004-041A
- SATCAT no.: 28446
- Mission duration: 15 years (planned); 20 years, 4 months, 20 days (elapsed)

Spacecraft properties
- Spacecraft: AMC-15
- Spacecraft type: Lockheed Martin A2100
- Bus: A2100AXS
- Manufacturer: Lockheed Martin
- Launch mass: 4,021 kg (8,865 lb)

Start of mission
- Launch date: 14 October 2004, 21:23:00 UTC
- Rocket: Proton-M / Briz-M
- Launch site: Baikonur, Site 200/39
- Contractor: Khrunichev State Research and Production Space Center
- Entered service: December 2004

Orbital parameters
- Reference system: Geocentric orbit
- Regime: Geostationary orbit
- Longitude: 105° West

Transponders
- Band: 36 transponders: 24 Ku-band at 36 MHz; 12 Ka-band
- Coverage area: Canada, United States, Alaska, Hawaii, Mexico

AMC-15 is an American communications satellite. Owned by SES Americom, AMC-15 was designed to be placed in geostationary orbit, following launch on a Proton-M / Briz-M space vehicle.

== Satellite description ==
Built by Lockheed Martin and based on the A2100AXS satellite bus, AMC-15 is located at 105° West longitude for EchoStar. AMC-15 has 24 Ku-band and 12 Ka-band transponders covering United States (including Hawaii and Alaska), part of Canada and Mexico. Leased to Echostar Satellite Services.

== Launch ==
It was launched atop a Proton-M / Briz-M launch vehicle at 21:23:00 UTC on 14 October 2004, from Site 200/39 at the Baikonur Cosmodrome in Kazakhstan. AMC-15 is completely leased to EchoStar Satellite Services.

== See also ==
- 2004 in spaceflight
