= PSLV-C4 =

- Model of the PSLV rocket
- Names: MetSat mission
- Mission type: Deployment of three satellites.
- Operator: ISRO
- Website: ISRO website
- Mission duration: 1,211 seconds

Spacecraft properties
- Spacecraft: Polar Satellite Launch Vehicle
- Spacecraft type: Expendable launch vehicle
- Manufacturer: ISRO
- Launch mass: 295,000 kilograms (650,000 lb)
- Payload mass: 1,060 kilograms (2,340 lb)
- Dimensions: 44.4 metres (146 ft) (overall height)

Start of mission
- Launch date: 15:53, September 12, 2002 (IST)
- Rocket: Polar Satellite Launch Vehicle
- Launch site: Sriharikota Launching Range
- Contractor: ISRO

End of mission
- Disposal: Placed in graveyard orbit
- Deactivated: September 12, 2002

Orbital parameters
- Reference system: Geosynchronous transfer orbit

Payload
- Kalpana-1 ( MetSat-1)
- Mass: 1,060 kilograms (2,340 lb)

PSLV-C4 was the fourth operational launch and overall seventh mission of the PSLV program. This launch was also the forty-eight launch by Indian Space Research Organisation since its first mission on 1 January 1962. The vehicle carried and injected India's first dedicated Meteorological satellite, Kalpana-1 (originally called MetSat) into the Geosynchronous transfer orbit. PSLV-C4 was launched at 15:53 hours IST on 12 September 2002 from Satish Dhawan Space Centre (then called "Sriharikota Launching Range").

== Mission highlights ==
- Fourth operational launch of the PSLV program.
- Overall seventh mission of the PSLV program.
- First Indian spaceflight to inject a satellite in the Geosynchronous transfer orbit.
- PSLV-C4 carried and injected India's first dedicated Meteorological satellite, Kalpana-1.

== Mission parameters ==
- Mass:
  - Total liftoff weight: 295,000 kilograms (650,000 lb)
  - Payload weight: 1,060 kilograms (2,340 lb)
- Overall height: 44.4 metres (145.7 ft)
- Propellant:
  - First stage: Solid HTPB based (138.0 + 54 tonnes)
  - Second stage: Liquid UDMH + N_{2}O_{4} (40.6 tonnes)
  - Third stage: Solid HTPB based (7.6 tonnes)
  - Fourth stage: Liquid MMH + MON (2.5 tonnes)
- Engine:
  - First stage: S139
  - Second stage: Vikas
  - Third stage:
  - Fourth stage: 2 x PS-4
- Thrust:
  - First stage: 4,628 + 662 x 6 kN
  - Second stage: 725 kN
  - Third stage: 260 kN
  - Fourth stage: 7.4 x 2 kN
- Duration: 1,211 seconds

== Payload ==
PSLV-C4 carried and deployed India's first dedicated Meteorological satellite, Kalpana-1 into the Geosynchronous transfer orbit.

Country	Name	Nos	Mass	Type	Objective
India	Kalpana-1	1	1,060 kg	Satellite	Meteorological satellite. Weather & climate monitoring of earth

== See also ==
- Indian Space Research Organisation
- Polar Satellite Launch Vehicle
