= XSS-10 =

Micro-spacecraft developed by U.S. Air Force

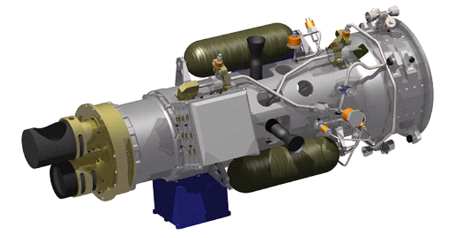
- XSS-10 computer model
- Mission type: Technology
- Operator: AFRL
- COSPAR ID: 2003-005B
- SATCAT no.: 27664

Spacecraft properties
- Manufacturer: Boeing
- Launch mass: 28 kilograms (62 lb)

Start of mission
- Launch date: January 29, 2003, 18:06:00 UTC
- Rocket: Delta II 7925-9.5 (Delta 295)
- Launch site: Cape Canaveral SLC-17B

Orbital parameters
- Reference system: Geocentric
- Regime: Low Earth
- Eccentricity: 0.020384971
- Perigee altitude: 518.0 kilometers (321.9 mi)
- Apogee altitude: 805.0 kilometers (500.2 mi)
- Inclination: 39.75 degrees
- Period: 98.0 minutes
- Epoch: 29 January 2003, 13:06:00 UTC

XSS-10 (eXperimental Small Satellite 10) was a small, low-cost micro-spacecraft developed by the U.S. Air Force Research Laboratory's Space Vehicles Directorate to test technology for line-of-sight guidance of spacecraft. The project was initiated at AFRL by Program Manager David Barnhart and completed by Georgia Tech Research Institute engineer Thom Davis and team. The project was declared a success shortly after launch.

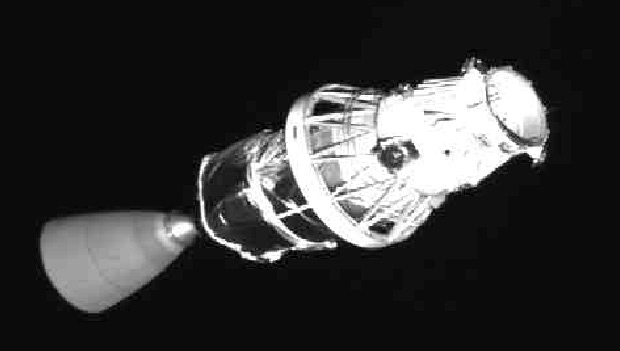
Spent upper stage of the Delta II launch vehicle imaged by the XSS-10 satellite
