= Ekspress-AM11 =

Russian communications satellite

- Names: Экспресс-АМ11; Ekspress-AM11; Express-AM11
- Mission type: Communications
- Operator: Russian Satellite Communications Company (RSCC)
- COSPAR ID: 2004-015A
- SATCAT no.: 28234
- Website: eng.rscc.ru
- Mission duration: 12 years (planned); 1.75 years (achieve)

Spacecraft properties
- Spacecraft: Ekspress-AM11
- Spacecraft type: KAUR
- Bus: MSS-2500-GSO
- Manufacturer: NPO PM (bus); Alcatel Space (payload)
- Launch mass: 2,542 kg (5,604 lb)
- Dry mass: 590 kg (1,300 lb)
- Power: 6 kW

Start of mission
- Launch date: 26 April 2004, 20:37:00 UTC
- Rocket: Proton-K / DM-2M
- Launch site: Baikonur, Site 200/39
- Contractor: Khrunichev State Research and Production Space Center
- Entered service: 1 July 2004

End of mission
- Disposal: Graveyard orbit
- Deactivated: April 2006

Orbital parameters
- Reference system: Geocentric orbit
- Regime: Geostationary orbit
- Longitude: 96.5° East (2004–2006)

Transponders
- Band: 30 transponders: 26 C-band; 4 Ku-band
- Coverage area: Russia, Southeast Asia, Australia

Ekspress-AM11 (Russian: Экспресс-АМ11, meaning Express-AM11) is a Russian communications satellite. It belongs to the Russian Satellite Communications Company (RSCC) based in Moscow, Russia.

== Satellite description ==
The satellite has a total of 30 transponders, 26 C-band and 4 Ku-band, for the domestic coverage of the Russian Federation.

== Launch ==
Ekspress-AM11 was launched by Khrunichev State Research and Production Space Center, using a Proton-K / DM-02 launch vehicle. The launch took place at 23:00:00 UTC on 28 December 2003, from Site 200/39 at Baikonur Cosmodrome, Kazakhstan. Successfully deployed into geostationary transfer orbit (GTO), Ekspress-AM11 raised itself into an operational geostationary orbit using its apogee motor.

== Mission ==
The satellite can be received in Southeast Asia], Australia and the most part of Russia. Ekspress-AM11 was hit on 28 March 2006 by either a micrometeorite or a piece of space debris, which lead to instantaneous depressurization of the thermal control system fluid circuit, followed by a sudden outburst of the heat-carrying agent. This resulted in a significant disturbing moment generation followed by the spacecraft orientation loss and rotation. After regaining control, the satellite was put into a graveyard orbit.
