= Kaituozhe (rocket family) =

Chinese solid fueled launch vehicle based on the road mobile DF-21 IRBM

The Kaituozhe (Chinese: 开拓者; pinyin: kāi tuò zhě; lit. 'pioneer') or KT rocket family is a series of launch vehicles built by the China Aerospace Science and Technology Corporation (CASC).

== Kaituozhe-1 ==
Kaituozhe-1 (KT-1) was a small, solid fueled launch vehicle based on the road mobile DF-21 IRBM with an additional upper stage (in total 4 stages). It was 13.6 meters in length and 1.4 meters in diameter, with launch mass of 20t. It was possible to launch KT-1 both from a truck-based platform or from airborne platform. It had a 100 kg to LEO payload capacity. It was possibly the launch vehicle for a Chinese ASAT system that was tested against an old Chinese weather satellite in 2007.

The vehicle has performed two flights, the first on 15 September 2002 and the second 16 September 2003. The first flight failed to place a 50 kg satellite into polar orbit due to a second stage malfunction. The second flight was also a failure, however Chinese officials declared some success citing the guidance systems, fairing separation and satellite-launcher separation as successful. The second launch sent the payload, PS-2 microsatellite (40 kg) into wrong orbit. The satellite completed barely one orbit before re-entering the atmosphere.

The Kaituozhe-1 launcher appears to have been cancelled after two unsuccessful launches. A third (in 2004) and fourth launch have been rumored, but are not confirmed.

The rocket had three variants: the Kaituozhe-1 (KT-1), the Kaituozhe-1A (KT-1A, originally designated KT-2, not to be confused with KT-2 below) and the Kaituozhe-1B (KT-1B, originally designated KT-2A, not to be confused with KT-2A below). The rockets that flew were of the KT-1 variant. The KT-1A and KT-1B variant rockets were not built.

== Kaituozhe-2 ==
Like its predecessor the Kaituozhe-2 (KT-2) is a solid-fueled launch vehicle which could be based on the DF-31 missile. Two versions have been proposed:

=== Kaituozhe-2 ===
The Kaituozhe-2 (KT-2, AKA Kaituo-2) features a possibly DF-31 based stage 1, topped by a small diameter stage 2 and 3. It has reportedly a payload of 800 kg to low earth orbit.

The maiden flight of the Kaituozhe-2 took place at 23:45 UTC on March 2, 2017, from Jiuquan (apparently from one of the two solid rocket launch pads). The rocket placed the Tiankun-1 (TK-1) satellite into polar orbit.

The KT-2 is a rapid-response launcher; the rocket is capable of mobile-launch from a transporter-erector-launcher (TEL) vehicle.

=== Kaituozhe-2A ===
The Kaituozhe-2A (KT-2A) features a possibly DF-31 based stage 1, augmented by two DF-21 based strap-on boosters. It features a stage 2 with the same diameter as the stage 1 and the same smaller diameter stage 3 as the Kaituozhe-2. It has reportedly a payload of 2000 kg to low Earth orbit.

== See also ==
- Comparison of orbital launchers families
- Comparison of orbital launch systems
- Kuaizhou launcher
- Long March 6
