= List of spacecraft with electric propulsion =

In chronological order, this is a partial list spacecraft that are equipped with electric space propulsion. This includes both cruise engines and/or thrusters for altitude and orbit control. It is not specified whether the given engine is the sole means of propulsion or whether other types of engine are also used on a spacecraft. The list does not claim to be comprehensive.

== Chronological overview ==
Spacecraft with electric propulsion
Spacecraft name	Launch date	End of life	Thruster type	No.	Model	Propellant	Spacecraft customer		Thruster prime		Comment
Program 661A Flight A	18 Dec 1962	18 Dec 1962	Ion engine	1		Cesium	(United States)	USAF	(United States)	EOS (Electro-Optical Systems, Inc.)	Suborbital, no operation of on-board ion engine
Kosmos 21	11 Nov 1963	11 Nov 1963	Pulsed plasma thruster			PTFE	(Soviet Union)		(Soviet Union)	Kurchatov Institute/OKB-1	Launch failure
Zond 1	2 Apr 1964	14 May 1964	Pulsed plasma thruster			PTFE	(Soviet Union)		(Soviet Union)	Kurchatov Institute/OKB-1	The experimental ion thruster-based attitude control system were tested but found to operate erratically, possibly due to the loss of pressure in the electronics compartment.
SERT 1	20 Jul 1964	20 Jul 1964	Ion engine	1; 1		Mercury; Cesium	(United States)	NASA	(United States)	NASA; Hughes	Space Electric Rocket Test, suborbital (31 min), the first demonstration of an ion engine in space - only the mercury engine by NASA was operated
Program 661A Flight B	29 Aug 1964	29 Aug 1964	Ion engine	1		Cesium	(United States)	USAF	(United States)	EOS	Suborbital, experimental test (19 min operation)
Zond 2	30 Nov 1964	14 May 1965	Pulsed plasma thruster			PTFE	(Soviet Union)		(Soviet Union)	Kurchatov Institute/OKB-1	Is widely regarded as the first application of electric propulsion systems in space (70 min of PPT operation)
Program 661A Flight C	21 Dec 1964	21 Dec 1964	Ion engine	1		Cesium	(United States)	USAF	(United States)	EOS	Suborbital, experimental test (4 min operation)
Snapshot	3 Apr 1965		Ion engine	1		Cesium	(United States)	USAF/Army	(United States)	EOS	Experimental 1 hour operation, SNAP-10A nuclear reactor
Zond 3	18 Jul 1965		Pulsed plasma thruster			PTFE	(Soviet Union)		(Soviet Union)		Operation of thruster failed
Yantar-1	13 Oct 1966	13 Oct 1966	Ion engine			Argon	(Soviet Union)		(Soviet Union)		Ballistic flight
Yantar-2	1968	1968	Ion engine			Nitrogen	(Soviet Union)		(Soviet Union)		Ballistic flight
ATS-4	10 Aug 1968		Ion engine	2		Cesium	(United States)	USAF/NASA	(United States)	EOS	Experimental 10 hours operation, Satellite Technology Applications
LES-6	26 Sep 1968		Pulsed plasma thruster	4		PTFE	(United States)	USAF	(United States)	MIT Lincoln Lab.	Lincoln Experimental Satellite
Yantar-3	1969	1969	Ion engine			Air	(Soviet Union)		(Soviet Union)		Ballistic flight
ATS-5	12 Aug 1969		Ion engine	2		Cesium	(United States)	USAF/NASA	(United States)	EOS	Experimental
SERT 2	3 Feb 1970		Ion engine	2		Mercury	(United States)	NASA	(United States)	NASA/Westinghouse	(Experimental), worked until 1981 (3781 hours)
Yantar-4	1971	1971	Ion engine			Air	(Soviet Union)		(Soviet Union)		Ballistic flight
Meteor 1-10	29 Dec 1971		Hall effect thruster	2	SPT-60	Xenon	(Soviet Union)		(Soviet Union)	OKB Fakel	Orbit control
L-4SC-3	20 Aug 1974	20 Aug 1974	Pulsed plasma thruster			PTFE	(Japan)	ISAS			Experimental, ballistic launch. Launch failure.
ATS-6	30 May 1974		Ion engine	2		Cesium	(United States)	NASA	(United States)	EOS	Experimental 92 hours operation
Meteor-Priroda 1 (Meteor 1-18)	9 Jul 1974		Hall effect thruster	2	SPT-60	Xenon	(Soviet Union)		(Soviet Union)	OKB Fakel	Orbit control
Kren-1 (Kosmos-728)	18 Apr 1975	18 Apr 1975	Magnetoplasmadynamic thruster			Potassium	(Soviet Union)		(Soviet Union)	NIITP	Ballistic flight
TIP-2	12 Oct 1975		Pulsed plasma thruster	2	TSPPS	PTFE	(United States)	US Navy	(United States)	Republic Aviation	Transit Improvement Program (Triad / NOVA), Teflon Solid Propellant Propulsion System
Kren-2 (Kosmos-780)	21 Nov 1975	21 Nov 1975	Magnetoplasmadynamic thruster			Potassium	(Soviet Union)		(Soviet Union)	NIITP	Ballistic flight
Meteor-Priroda 2-1 (Meteor 1-25)	15 May 1976		Hall effect thruster	2	SPT-60	Xenon	(Soviet Union)		(Soviet Union)	OKB Fakel	Orbit control
TIP-3	1 Sep 1976		Pulsed plasma thruster	2	TSPPS	PTFE	(United States)	US Navy	(United States)	Republic Aviation	Transit Improvement Program (Triad/NOVA), Teflon Solid Propellant Propulsion System
Meteor-Priroda 2-2 (Meteor 1-28)	29 Jun 1977		Hall effect thruster	2	SPT-50	Xenon	(Soviet Union)		(Soviet Union)	OKB Fakel	Orbit control
Kust-1	7 Dec 1977	7 Dec 1977	Magnetoplasmadynamic thruster			Air	(Soviet Union)		(Soviet Union)		Ballistic flight, Russian acronym of Kubarev, thruster, jet
Kust-2	30 Nov 1978	30 Nov 1978	Magnetoplasmadynamic thruster			Air	(Soviet Union)		(Soviet Union)		Ballistic flight
Astrofizika (Kosmos 1066)	23 Dec 1978		Hall effect thruster	2	SPT-50	Xenon	(Soviet Union)		(Soviet Union)	OKB Fakel	Orbit control
Kust-3	21 Jan 1979	21 Jan 1979	Magnetoplasmadynamic thruster			Air	(Soviet Union)		(Soviet Union)		Ballistic flight
SCATHA (P78-2)	30 Jan 1979		Ion source	1		Xenon	(United States)	USAF/NASA	(United States)	Hughes	Satellite Positive Ion Beam System (SPIBS), No engine in the strict sense
Intelsat-5 F-2	6 Dec 1980		Resistojet			Hydrazine	(United States)	ITSO/Inmarsat			Communications satellite, and 1984, eight satellites
MS-T4 (Tansei 4)	17 Feb 1980	13 May 1983	Magnetoplasmadynamic thruster			Ammonia	(Japan)	ISAS			Experimental, thruster for spin-up
ETS-4 (Kiku 3)	11 Feb 1981	24 Dec 1984	Pulsed plasma thruster			PTFE	(Japan)	NASDA	(Japan)	AIST	Engineering Test Satellite (experimental)
Nova-1	14 May 1981		Pulsed plasma thruster		TSPPS	PTFE	(United States)	US Navy	(United States)		Transit Improvement Program (Triad/NOVA), Teflon Solid Propellant Propulsion System
Meteor-Priroda 2-4 (Meteor 1-31)	10 Jul 1981		Hall effect thruster	2	SPT-50	Xenon	(Soviet Union)		(Soviet Union)	OKB Fakel	Orbit control
MDT-2A	7 Dec 1981	7 Dec 1981	Pulsed plasma thruster			PTFE	(China)		(China)	SSTC Academia Sinica	Ballistic Missile
Potok 1/Geizer 1 (Kosmos 1366)	17 May 1982		Hall effect thruster	4	SPT-70	Xenon	(Soviet Union)		(Soviet Union)	OKB Fakel	
ETS-3 (Kiku 4)	3 Sep 1982	8 Mar 1985	Ion engine	2		Mercury	(Japan)	NASDA	(Japan)	MELCO	Engineering Test Satellite (experimental)
Potok 2/Geizer 2 (Kosmos 1540)	2 Mar 1984		Hall effect thruster	4	SPT-70	Xenon	(Soviet Union)		(Soviet Union)	OKB Fakel	
Nova-3	12 Oct 1984		Pulsed plasma thruster		TSPPS	PTFE	(United States)	US Navy	(United States)		Transit Improvement Program (Triad/NOVA), Teflon Solid Propellant Propulsion System
Luch #1 (Kosmos 1700)	25 Oct 1985		Hall effect thruster	4	SPT-70	Xenon	(Soviet Union)		(Soviet Union)	OKB Fakel	
Potok 3/Geizer 3 (Kosmos 1738)	4 Apr 1986		Hall effect thruster	4	SPT-70	Xenon	(Soviet Union)		(Soviet Union)	OKB Fakel	
Plazma-A #1 (Kosmos 1818)	1 Feb 1987		Hall effect thruster	6	SPT-70	Xenon	(Soviet Union)		(Soviet Union)	OKB Fakel	Orbit control, Topaz-1 nuclear reactor
Plazma-A #2 (Kosmos 1867)	10 Jul 1987		Hall effect thruster	6	SPT-70	Xenon	(Soviet Union)		(Soviet Union)	OKB Fakel	Orbit control, Topaz-1 nuclear reactor
Start-1	7 Aug 1987		Magnetoplasmadynamic thruster		AMPDT	Air	(Soviet Union)		(Soviet Union)		Autonomous MPD Thruster
Start-2	9 Sep 1987		Magnetoplasmadynamic thruster		AMPDT	Argon	(Soviet Union)		(Soviet Union)		Autonomous MPD Thruster
Potok 4/Geizer 5 (Kosmos 1888)	1 Oct 1987		Hall effect thruster	4	SPT-70	Xenon	(Soviet Union)		(Soviet Union)	OKB Fakel	
Luch #2 (Kosmos 1897)	26 Nov 1987		Hall effect thruster	4	SPT-70	Xenon	(Soviet Union)		(Soviet Union)	OKB Fakel	
Nova-2	16 Jun 1988		Pulsed plasma thruster		TSPPS	PTFE	(United States)	US Navy	(United States)		Transit Improvement Program (Triad/NOVA), Teflon Solid Propellant Propulsion System
Potok 5/Geizer 6 (Kosmos 1961)	1 Aug 1988		Hall effect thruster	4	SPT-70	Xenon	(Soviet Union)		(Soviet Union)	OKB Fakel	
Luch #3 (Kosmos 2054)	27 Dec 1989		Hall effect thruster	4	SPT-70	Xenon	(Soviet Union)		(Soviet Union)	OKB Fakel	
Potok 6/Geizer 7 (Kosmos 2085)	18 Jul 1990		Hall effect thruster	4	SPT-70	Xenon	(Soviet Union)		(Soviet Union)	OKB Fakel	
Potok 7/Geizer 8 (Kosmos 2172)	22 Nov 1991		Hall effect thruster	4	SPT-70	Xenon	(Soviet Union)		(Soviet Union)	OKB Fakel	
EURECA	2 Aug 1992	1 Jul 1993	Ion engine		RIT-10 (RITA)	Xenon		ESA	(Germany)	MBB	240 hours operation
Telstar 401	16 Dec 1993	11 Jan 1997	Arcjet		MR-508	Hydrazine	(United States)	AT&T	(United States)	Rocket Research Co.	Communication satellite (Lockheed Martin AS-7000)
Gals-1	20 Jan 1994		Hall effect thruster	8	SPT-100	Xenon	(Russia)		(Russia)	OKB Fakel	Communication Satellite
ETS-6 (Kiku 6)	28 Aug 1994	9 Jul 1996	Ion engine		XIES	Xenon	(Japan)	NASDA	(Japan)	Mitsubishi Electric	Experimental, Xenon Ion Engine System
Telstar 402	9 Sep 1994	9 Sep 1994	Arcjet		MR-508	Hydrazine	(United States)	AT&T	(United States)	Rocket Research Co.	Communication satellite (Lockheed Martin AS-7000), exploded shortly after launch
Potok 8/Geizer 9 (Kosmos 2291)	21 Sep 1994		Hall effect thruster	4	SPT-70	Xenon	(Russia)		(Russia)	OKB Fakel	
Ekspress 1	13 Oct 1994		Hall effect thruster	8	SPT-100	Xenon	(Russia)		(Russia)	OKB Fakel	
Luch 4	16 Dec 1994		Hall effect thruster	4	SPT-70	Xenon	(Russia)		(Russia)	OKB Fakel	
Space Flyer Unit (SFU)	18 Mar 1995	13 Jan 1996	Magnetoplasmadynamic thruster	1	EPEX	Hydrazine	(Japan)	ISAS/NASDA	(Japan)	ISAS	Electric Propulsion Experiment, 43395 pulses of operation
Potok 9/Geizer 10 (Kosmos 2319)	30 Aug 1995		Hall effect thruster	4	SPT-70	Xenon	(Russia)		(Russia)	OKB Fakel	
Telstar 402R (Telstar 4)	24 Sep 1995	Sep 2003	Arcjet		MR-508	Hydrazine	(United States)	AT&T	(United States)	Rocket Research Co.	Communication satellite (Lockheed Martin AS-7000)
Luch2-1	11 Oct 1995		Hall effect thruster	4	SPT-70	Xenon	(Russia)		(Russia)	OKB Fakel	
Gals-2	17 Nov 1995		Hall effect thruster	8	SPT-100	Xenon	(Russia)		(Russia)	OKB Fakel	Communication Satellite
Ekspress 2	26 Sep 1996		Hall effect thruster	8	SPT-100	Xenon	(Russia)		(Russia)	OKB Fakel	
A2100	1997		Arcjet		MR-510		(United States)	Lockheed/Aerojet			Communication Satellite
PAS 5 (now: Intelsat 5)	28 Aug 1997		Ion engine		XIPS	Xenon	(United States)	PanAmSat	(United States)	Hughes-EDD	Satellite bus based on HS-601HP (first commercial satellite with XIPS)
Kupon-1	12 Nov 1997	Mar 1998	Hall effect thruster	4	SPT-70	Xenon	(Russia)	Bank of Russia	(Russia)	OKB Fakel	Communication Satellite
Galaxy 8i	8 Dec 1997	2004	Ion engine		XIPS	Xenon	(United States)	PanAmSat	(United States)	Hughes-EDD	Satellite bus based on Hughes HS-601HP
Astra 2A	30 Aug 1998		Ion engine		XIPS	Xenon	(Luxembourg)	SES	(United States)	Hughes-EDD	Satellite bus based on Hughes HS-601HP
STEX (NROL-8)	3 Oct 1998		Hall effect thruster		TAL-D55	Xenon	(United States)	NRO	(Russia)	TsNIIMash	EPDM (Electric Propulsion Demonstration Module)
Deep Space 1	24 Oct 1998	2001	Ion engine	1	NSTAR	Xenon	(United States)	NASA	(United States)	NASA	
Satmex 5 (now: Eutelsat 115 West A)	5 Dec 1998		Ion engine		XIPS	Xenon	(Mexico)	Satmex	(United States)	Hughes-EDD	Satellite bus based on Hughes HS-601HP; propulsion failed on 27 Jan 2010
PAS 6B (now: Intelsat 6B)	21 Dec 1998		Ion engine		XIPS	Xenon	(United States)	PanAmSat	(United States)	Hughes-EDD	Satellite bus based on Hughes HS-601HP
ARGOS (P91-1)	23 Feb 1999	31 Jul 2003	Arcjet		ESEX	Ammonia	(United States)	USAF	(United States)	Rocket Research Co.	Experimental military satellite, Electric Propulsion Space Experiment
Orion 3	5 May 1999		Ion engine		XIPS	Xenon	(United States)	Orion Network Systems	(United States)	Hughes-EDD	Satellite bus based on Hughes HS-601HP; injected into wrong orbit
Astra 1H	18 Jun 1999		Ion engine		XIPS	Xenon	(Luxembourg)	SES	(United States)	Hughes-EDD	Satellite bus based on Hughes HS-601HP
Yamal 101	6 Sep 1999		Hall effect thruster	8	SPT-70	Xenon	(Russia)	Gazcom	(Russia)	OKB Fakel	Communications satellite
Yamal 102	6 Sep 1999		Hall effect thruster	8	SPT-70	Xenon	(Russia)	Gazcom	(Russia)	OKB Fakel	Communications satellite
DirecTV 1R	10 Oct 1999		Ion engine	4	XIPS	Xenon	(United States)	DirecTV	(United States)	Hughes-EDD	Communications satellite bus based on Hughes HS-601HP
Ekspress-A 1	27 Oct 1999	27 Oct 1999	Hall effect thruster	8	SPT-100	Xenon	(Russia)	RSCC	(Russia)	OKB Fakel	Communication satellite, satellite lost during launch
Galaxy 10R	25 Jan 2000	2009	Ion engine		XIPS	Xenon	(United States)	PanAmSat	(United States)	Hughes-EDD	Satellite bus based on Hughes HS-601HP; reduced mission time due to malfunction in XIPS
Ekspress-A 2	12 Mar 2000		Hall effect thruster	8	SPT-100	Xenon	(Russia)	RSCC	(Russia)	OKB Fakel	Communication satellite
SESAT 1 (now: Eutelsat 16C)	17 Apr 2000		Hall effect thruster	8	SPT-100	Xenon	(France)	Eutelsat	(Russia)	OKB Fakel	Communications satellite, Ekspress satellite bus by NPO PM
Galaxy 4R	19 Apr 2000	2006	Ion engine		XIPS	Xenon	(United States)	PanAmSat	(United States)	Hughes-EDD	Satellite bus based on Hughes HS-601HP; XIPS failed by 2003
Ekspress-A 3	24 Jun 2000		Hall effect thruster	8	SPT-100	Xenon	(Russia)	RSCC	(Russia)	OKB Fakel	Communication satellite
Potok 10/Geizer 12 (Kosmos 2371)	4 Jul 2000		Hall effect thruster	4	SPT-70	Xenon	(Russia)		(Russia)	OKB Fakel	
MightySat II.1	19 Jul 2000	12 Nov 2002	Pulsed plasma thruster			PTFE	(United States)	AFRL	(United States)	USAF/NASA/Olin Aerospace Co.	Experimental satellite
PAS 9 (now: Intelsat 9)	28 Jul 2000		Ion engine		XIPS	Xenon	(United States)	PanAmSat	(United States)	Hughes-EDD	Satellite bus based on Hughes HS-601HP
AMSAT-Phase 3-D (OSCAR-40)	16 Nov 2000	2004	Arcjet		ATOS	Ammonia	(Germany)	AMSAT	(Germany)	University of Stuttgart, IRS	Arcjet Thruster on OSCAR Satellite, operated in cold gas mode
EO-1	21 Nov 2000	30 Mar 2017	Pulsed plasma thruster			PTFE	(United States)	NASA	(United States)	Primex Aerospace	Earth Observing-1, technology demonstrator
PAS 10 (now: Intelsat 10)	15 May 2001		Ion engine		XIPS	Xenon	(United States)	PanAmSat	(United States)	Boeing-EDD	Satellite bus based on Hughes HS-601HP
Astra 2C	16 Jun 2001		Ion engine		XIPS	Xenon	(Luxembourg)	SES	(United States)	Boeing-EDD	Satellite bus based on Hughes 601HP
Artemis	12 Jul 2001	Nov 2017	Ion engine	4	RIT-10 (RITA) and UK-10(T5)	Xenon		ESA	(Germany)	Astrium	Advanced Relay Technology Mission ESA Artemis satellite using 4 ion engines (2 RIT and 2 UK-10) has paved the way for the use of electric propulsion in telecommunication spacecraft.
DirecTV 4S	27 Nov 2001		Ion engine	4	XIPS	Xenon	(United States)	DirecTV	(United States)	Boeing-EDD	Satellite bus based on Boeing BSS-601HP
Ekspress-A 1R (Ekspress-A 4)	10 Jun 2002		Hall effect thruster	8	SPT-100(?), KM-5	Xenon	(Russia)	RSCC	(Russia)	OKB Fakel(?), Keldysh	Communication satellite
AsiaSat 4	11 Apr 2003		Ion engine	4	XIPS	Xenon	(Hong Kong)	AsiaSat	(United States)	Boeing-EDD	Satellite bus based on Boeing BSS-601HP
Hayabusa	9 May 2003	13 Jun 2010	Ion engine	4	μ10	Xenon	(Japan)	JAXA	(Japan)	JAXA/ISAS	
SMART-1	28 Sep 2003	3 Sep 2006	Hall effect thruster	1	PPS-1350	Xenon		ESA	(France)	Snecma	Small Missions for Advanced Research in Technology
Galaxy 13 / Horizons 1	1 Oct 2003		Ion engine		XIPS	Xenon	(United States) (Japan)	PanAmSat/JSAT	(United States)	Boeing-EDD	Satellite bus based on Boeing BSS-601HP
Yamal 201	24 Nov 2003		Hall effect thruster	8	SPT-70	Xenon	(Russia)	Gazcom	(Russia)	OKB Fakel	
Yamal 202	24 Nov 2003		Hall effect thruster	8	SPT-70	Xenon	(Russia)	Gazcom	(Russia)	OKB Fakel	
Ekspress-AM 1	29 Oct 2004	10 Aug 2013	Hall effect thruster	8	SPT-100	Xenon	(Russia)	RSCC	(Russia)	OKB Fakel	
AMC 12 (Astra 4A / Star One C12 / now: NSS 10)	3 Feb 2005		Hall effect thruster	4	SPT-100	Xenon	(United States)	SES Americom	(Russia)	OKB Fakel	Communications satellite based on Alcatel Alenia Spacebus-4000C3
Ekspress-AM 2	29 Mar 2005		Hall effect thruster	8	SPT-100	Xenon	(Russia)	RSCC	(Russia)	OKB Fakel	
Monitor-E	26 Aug 2005		Hall effect thruster		SPT-100	Xenon	(Russia)	Roskosmos	(Russia)	OKB Fakel	Earth observation satellite based on Khrunichev Yachta bus
MBSat 1 (ABS 2i / now: ABS 4 (Mobisat))	13 Mar 2004		Hall effect thruster	4	SPT-100	Xenon	(Japan) (Bermuda)	MBCO; Sold to: ABS	(Russia)	OKB Fakel	Satellite based on Space Systems/Loral SSL-1300
Ekspress-AM 3	29 Oct 2004		Hall effect thruster	8	SPT-100	Xenon	(Russia)	RSCC	(Russia)	OKB Fakel	
AMC 23	29 Dec 2005		Hall effect thruster	4	SPT-100	Xenon	(United States)	SES Americom	(Russia)	OKB Fakel	Communications satellite based on Alcatel Alenia Spacebus-4000C3
KazSat-1	18 Jun 2005		Hall effect thruster	8	SPT-70	Xenon	(Kazakhstan)	JSC KazSat	(Russia)	OKB Fakel	Communications satellite based on Khrunichev Yachta bus
ION	26 Jul 2006	26 Jul 2006	Vacuum arc thruster	4	μVAT	Tungsten	(United States)	UIUC	(United States)	UIUC	Satellite lost during injection phase
MEASAT-3	11 Dec 2006		Ion engine	4	XIPS	Xenon	(Malaysia)	MEASAT	(United States)	L-3 ETI	Satellite bus based on Boeing BSS-601HP
TacSat-2	16 Dec 2006	5 Feb 2011	Hall effect thruster	1	BHT-200	Xenon	(United States)	USAF	(United States)	Busek	Microsatellite Propulsion Integration (MPI) Experiment, military applications
ETS-8 (Kiku 8)	18 Dec 2006		Ion engine	4	XIES	Xenon	(Japan)	JAXA	(Japan)	Mitsubishi Electric	
FalconSat-3	9 Mar 2007		Pulsed plasma thruster	4	MPACS	PTFE	(United States)	USAFA	(United States)	Busek	Experimental Satellite, Micro-Propulsion Attitude Control System
Dawn	27 Sep 2007		Ion engine	3	NSTAR	Xenon	(United States)	NASA	(United States)	NASA	
Telstar 11N	26 Feb 2009		Hall effect thruster	4	SPT-100	Xenon	(United States)	Loral Skynet	(Russia)	OKB Fakel	Satellite based on Space Systems/Loral SSL-1300
GOCE	17 Mar 2009	11 Nov 2013	Ion engine	2	T5	Xenon		ESA	(United Kingdom)	QinetiQ	
Sirius FM5 (Radiosat 5)	30 Jun 2009		Hall effect thruster	4	SPT-100	Xenon	(United States)	Sirius Satellite Radio	(Russia)	OKB Fakel	Satellite based on Space Systems/Loral SSL-1300
STSAT-2A	25 Aug 2009	25 Aug 2009	Pulsed plasma thruster				(South Korea)	KARI	(South Korea)	KAIST/SaTReC	Satellite lost during injection phase
NSS-12	29 Oct 2009		Hall effect thruster	4	SPT-100	Xenon	(Netherlands)	SES New Skies	(Russia)	OKB Fakel	Satellite based on Space Systems/Loral SSL-1300
GSAT-4 (Healthsat)	15 Apr 2010	15 Apr 2010	Hall effect thruster	2; 2	KM-45 (Unnamed)	Xenon	(India)	ISRO	(Russia) (India)	Keldysh; ISRO	Launcher failed to reach orbit
STSAT-2B	10 Jun 2010	10 Jun 2010	Pulsed plasma thruster				(South Korea)	KARI	(South Korea)	KAIST/SaTReC	Satellite lost during injection phase
AEHF-SV-1 (USA-214)	14 Aug 2010		Hall effect thruster	4	BPT-4000 (XR-5)	Xenon	(United States)	USAF	(United States)	Aerojet	Satellite based on Lockheed Martin A2100; mission saved by Hall thruster
FalconSat-5 (USA-221)	20 Nov 2010		Hall effect thruster		BHT-200	Xenon	(United States)	USAF	(United States)	Busek	Experimental Satellite
KazSat-2	16 Jul 2011		Hall effect thruster	8	SPT-70	Xenon	(Kazakhstan)	JSC KazSat	(Russia)	OKB Fakel	Communications satellite based on Khrunichev Yachta bus
Fobos-Grunt	9 Nov 2011	15 Jan 2012	Hall effect thruster	3	SPT-140	Xenon	(Russia)	Roskosmos	(Russia)	OKB Fakel	Failed to reach intended trajectory
SES-4	14 Feb 2012		Hall effect thruster	4	SPT-100	Xenon	(Netherlands)	SES World Skies	(Russia)	OKB Fakel	
AEHF-SV-2 (USA-235)	4 May 2012		Hall effect thruster		BPT-4000 (XR-5)	Xenon	(United States)	USAF	(United States)	Aerojet	Satellite based on Lockheed Martin A2100
SES-5	9 Jul 2012		Hall effect thruster	4	SPT-100	Xenon	(Netherlands)	SES World Skies	(Russia)	OKB Fakel	
Kanopus-V	22 Jul 2012		Hall effect thruster	2	SPT-50	Xenon	(Russia)	Roskosmos	(Russia)	OKB Fakel	Earth observation satellite
TET-1	22 Jul 2012		Resistojet	1	Aquajet	Water	(Germany)	DLR	(Germany)	Aerospace Innovation	Experimental
PROITERES	9 Sep 2012		Pulsed plasma thruster	4		PTFE	(Japan)	OIT	(Japan)	OIT	Academic satellite, communication loss before propulsion test
Shijian-9A (SJ-9A)	14 Oct 2012		Hall effect thruster Ion engine		HET-40; LIPS-200	Xenon	(China)	COSTIND	(China)	SISP; LIP	Experimental satellite based on CAST-2000
Yamal 402	8 Dec 2012		Hall effect thruster	4	SPT-100	Xenon	(Russia)	Gazcom	(Russia)	OKB Fakel	Satellite based on Spacebus-4000C3, satellite failed to reach intended orbit
STRaND-1	25 Feb 2013		Pulsed plasma thruster				(United Kingdom)	SSTL	(United Kingdom)	SSTL	3U Cubesat propulsion demonstration
Alphasat (Inmarsat-4A F4)	25 Jul 2013		Hall effect thruster	4	PPS-1350	Xenon	(United Kingdom)	Inmarsat/ESA	(France)	Snecma	Operational
AEHF-SV-3 (USA-246)	18 Sep 2013		Hall effect thruster		BPT-4000 (XR-5)	Xenon	(United States)	USAF	(United States)	Aerojet	Satellite based on Lockheed Martin A2100
CUSat	29 Sep 2013	16 Oct 2013	Pulsed plasma thruster			PTFE	(United States)	Cornell University	(United States)	Cornell University; University of Washington	Technology demonstration
STSAT-3	21 Nov 2013	Dec 2015	Hall effect thruster	1		Xenon	(South Korea)	KARI	(South Korea)	KAIST/SaTReC	
DubaiSat-2	21 Nov 2013		Hall effect thruster	1		Xenon	(United Arab Emirates)	MBRSC	(South Korea) (Japan)	Satrec Initiative; JAXA (Neutralizer)	Satellite bus based on Satrec Initiative SI-300
Wren	21 Nov 2013		Pulsed plasma thruster	4			(Germany)	StaDoKo	(Germany)	StaDoKo	1U PocketQub propulsion
Ekspress-AM5	26 Dec 2013		Hall effect thruster		SPT-100	Xenon	(Russia)	RSCC	(Russia)	OKB Fakel	EP system used to insert the satellite into GEO. Unclear if EP is also used for station keeping.
KazSat-3	28 Apr 2014		Hall effect thruster		SPT-100	Xenon	(Kazakhstan)	JSC KazSat	(Russia)	OKB Fakel	Communications satellite based on Ekspress 1000 NTA bus
Deimos-2	19 Jun 2014		Hall effect thruster		HEPS	Xenon	(Spain)	Deimos Imaging	(South Korea)	Satrec Initiative	Satellite bus based on Satrec Initiative SI-300
Hodoyoshi 4	19 Jun 2014		Ion engine	1	MIPS	Xenon	(Japan)	University of Tokyo/NESTRA	(Japan)	University of Tokyo	
MKA-FKI PN2 (Vernov)	8 Jul 2014	Dec 2014	Pulsed plasma thruster		APPT-45-2	PTFE	(Russia)	Russian Academy of Sciences	(Russia)	RIAME	Satellite based on bus Karat; communication loss before thruster operation
Ekspress-AM6 (Eutelsat 53A)	21 Oct 2014		Hall effect thruster		SPT-100	Xenon	(Russia)	RSCC	(Russia)	OKB Fakel	EP system used to insert the satellite into GEO. Unclear if EP is also used for station keeping.
Hayabusa2	3 Dec 2014		Ion engine	4		Xenon	(Japan)	JAXA	(Japan)	JAXA/ISAS	
PROCYON	3 Dec 2014		Ion engine	1	I-COUPS	Xenon	(Japan)	JAXA/University of Tokyo	(Japan)	University of Tokyo	PRoximate Object Close flYby with Optical Navigation, experimental >200 h operation
Yamal 401	15 Dec 2014		Hall effect thruster	4	SPT-100	Xenon	(Russia)	Gazcom	(Russia)	OKB Fakel	Satellite based on bus Ekspress-2000A
ABS-3A	2 Mar 2015		Ion engine	4	XIPS-25	Xenon	(Bermuda)	ABS	(United States)	L-3 ETI	First Boeing 702SP all-electric satellites
Satmex 7 (now: Eutelsat 115 West B)	2 Mar 2015		Ion engine	4	XIPS-25	Xenon	(Mexico)	Satmex	(United States)	L-3 ETI	First Boeing 702SP all-electric satellites
BRICsat-P	20 May 2015		Vacuum arc thruster	4	μCAT		(United States)	USNA	(United States)	GW University	Detumbling, spin and a delta-V for a 1.5U cubesat in 500km orbit
AeroCube 8A	20 May 2015		Electrospray Thruster	1	SiEPro	Ionic liquid	(United States)	The Aerospace Corporation	(United States)	MIT	1.5 U cubesat
AeroCube 8B	20 May 2015		Electrospray Thruster	1	SiEPro	Ionic liquid	(United States)	The Aerospace Corporation	(United States)	MIT	1.5 U cubesat
KaiTuo-1A (XinJiShu YanZheng-2)	19 Sep 2015		Hall effect thruster	1; 1	LHT-100 (Unnamed)	Xenon	(China)		(China)	LIP; BICE	Experimental Satellite
Lisa Pathfinder	3 Dec 2015		Electrospray Thruster	8	CMNT	Ionic Liquid Propellant		ESA	(United States)	Busek	Very precise attitude control
Horyu-4 (AEGIS)	18 Feb 2016		Vacuum arc thruster				(Japan)	KIT	(Japan)	KIT	
SES-9	4 Mar 2016		Ion engine	4	XIPS-25	Xenon	(Luxembourg)	SES	(United States)	L-3 ETI	
ABS-2A	15 Jun 2016		Ion engine	4	XIPS-25	Xenon	(Bermuda)	ABS	(United States)	L-3 ETI	Satellite based on all-electric bus Boeing 702SP
Satmex 9 (now: Eutelsat 117 West B)	15 Jun 2016		Ion engine	4	XIPS-25	Xenon	(Mexico)	Satmex	(United States)	L-3 ETI	Satellite based on all-electric bus Boeing 702SP
Shijian-17 (SJ-17)	3 Nov 2016		Hall effect thruster		LHT-100	Xenon	(China)	CAST	(China)	LIP	
AeroCube 8C	11 Nov 2016		Electrospray Thruster	1	SiEPro	Ionic liquid	(United States)	The Aerospace Corporation	(United States)	MIT	1.5 U cubesat
AeroCube 8D	11 Nov 2016		Electrospray Thruster	1	SiEPro	Ionic liquid	(United States)	The Aerospace Corporation	(United States)	MIT	1.5 U cubesat
AOBA-VELOX III	9 Dec 2016		Pulsed plasma thruster	1		PTFE	(Singapore) (Japan)	NTU; KIT	(Singapore)	NTU	2U-Cubesat propulsion, satellite piggyback on HTV-6, deployed from ISS on 16 Jan 2017
Hispasat 36W-1 (SmallGEO)	27 Jan 2017		Hall effect thruster	8	SPT-100	Xenon	(Spain)	Hispasat	(Russia)	OKB Fakel	Satellite based on OHB Luxor bus
SES-10	30 Mar 2017		Hall effect thruster		SPT-100	Xenon	(Luxembourg)	SES	(Russia)	OKB Fakel	
Shijian-13 (SJ-13)	12 Apr 2017		Ion engine	4	LIPS-200	Xenon	(China)	CAST & ChinaSatcom	(China)	LIP	Satellite based on DongFangHong-3B satellite bus
GSAT-9 (South Asian Satellite)	5 May 2017		Hall effect thruster	4	KM-45	Xenon	(India)	ISRO	(Russia)	Keldysh	Station-keeping of satellite, including orbit changes
SES-15	18 May 2017		Ion engine	4	XIPS-25	Xenon	(United States)	SES World Skies	(United States)	L-3 ETI	Satellite based on all-electric bus Boeing 702SP
Eutelsat 172B	1 Jun 2017		Hall effect thruster	4	SPT-140	Xenon	(France)	Eutelsat	(Russia)	OKB Fakel	Satellite based on all-electric bus Eurostar-3000EOR
PEGASUS	23 Jun 2017		Pulsed plasma thruster	4		PTFE	(Austria)	FH Wiener Neustadt	(Austria)	FH Wiener Neustadt	Cubesat propulsion; part of QB50
Shijian-18	2 Jul 2017	2 Jul 2017	Ion engine		LIPS-300	Xenon	(China)		(China)	LIP	Launcher failed to reach orbit
VENμS	2 Aug 2017		Hall effect thruster	2	IHET-300	Xenon	(Israel) (France)	ISA; CNES	(Israel)	Rafael	Station-keeping, fine attitude control and orbit change
AsiaSat-9	28 Sep 2017		Hall effect thruster	4	SPT-100	Xenon	(Hong Kong)	AsiaSat	(Russia)	OKB Fakel	Satellite based on Space Systems Loral SSL-1300 bus
SLATS (Tsubame)	23 Dec 2017	2 Oct 2019	Ion engine	1	XIES	Xenon	(Japan)		(Japan)		
Flock-3p'	12 Jan 2018		FEEP	1	IFM Nano	Indium	(United States)	Planet Labs	(Austria)	Enpulsion	First successful IOD of a FEEP thruster on a 3U Cubesat
SES-14	25 Jan 2018		Hall effect thruster		SPT-140	Xenon	(Luxembourg)	SES	(Russia)	OKB Fakel	Satellite based on all-electric bus Eurostar Neo
SES-12	4 Jun 2018		Hall effect thruster		SPT-140	Xenon	(Luxembourg)	SES	(Russia)	OKB Fakel	Satellite based on all-electric bus Eurostar Neo
NovaSAR	16 Sep 2018		Resistojet; Quad confinement thruster	1; 1	QCT-200	Xenon	(United Kingdom)	SSTL/ADS UK	(United Kingdom)	SSTL; SSC/SSTL	Satellite based on SSTL-300 bus
BepiColombo	20 Oct 2018		Ion engine	4	T6	Xenon	(Japan)	ESA & JAXA	(United Kingdom)	QinetiQ	Solar Electric Propulsion System (SEPS)
(undisclosed)	2018		FEEP	4	IFM Nano	Indium			(Austria)	Enpulsion	
(undisclosed)	2018		FEEP	1	IFM Nano	Indium			(Austria)	Enpulsion	
FalconSat-6	3 Dec 2018		Hall effect thruster		BHT-200	Xenon	(United States)	USAF	(United States)	Busek	Experimental Satellite
UWE-4	27 Dec 2018		FEEP	4	NanoFEEP	Gallium	(Germany)	Universität Würzburg	(Germany)	Morpheus Space	First IOD of orbit control on a picosatellite using electric propulsion
AOBA-VELOX-IV	18 Jan 2019		Pulsed plasma thruster	4		PTFE	(Singapore) (Japan)	NTU; KIT	(Singapore)	NTU	
Xiaoxiang-1 03	21 Jan 2019		Electrospray thruster				(China)	Spacety Aerospace Corp.	(China)	206th Institute	
(undisclosed)	2019		FEEP	4	IFM Nano	Indium			(Austria)	Enpulsion	
PSN-6 (Nusantara Satu)	22 Feb 2019					Xenon	(Indonesia)	PT Pasifik Satelit Nusantara	(United States)	SSL	
(undisclosed)	2019		FEEP	7	IFM Nano	Indium			(Austria)	Enpulsion	
Starlink L0	23 May 2019		Hall effect thruster	60		Krypton	(United States)	SpaceX	(United States)	SpaceX	First operational Starlink satellite design
Yamal 601	30 May 2019		Hall effect thruster	4	SPT-100	Xenon	(Russia)	Gazprom	(Russia)	OKB Fakel	Satellite based on bus Ekspress-2000A
(undisclosed)	2019		FEEP	4	IFM Nano	Indium			(Austria)	Enpulsion	
(undisclosed)	2019		FEEP	4	IFM Nano	Indium			(Austria)	Enpulsion	
Starlink Launch 1-28 (V1)	11 Nov 2019-26 May 2021		Hall effect thruster			Krypton	(United States)	SpaceX	(United States)	SpaceX	All Starlink v1 satellite launches -a more detailed list is available here
JCSAT-18/Kacific-1	17 Dec 2019		Ion engine	4	XIPS	Xenon		SKY Perfect JSAT / Kacific	(United States)	Boeing-EDD	Boeing 702
Shijian-20(SJ-20)	27 Dec 2019		Ion engine		LIPS-300	Xenon	(China)	CAST	(China)	LIP	Back-up of Shijian-18 based on DFH-5 Bus
Eutelsat KONNECT	17 Jan 2020				Spacebus Neo Xenon Propulsion System (XPS)	Xenon					
APStar 6D	9 July 2020		Ion engine		LIPS-300	Xenon	(China)		(China)	LIP	DFH-5 bus
SES-17	24 Oct 2021		Hall effect thruster			Xenon	(Luxembourg)	SES	(France)	Snecma (TBC)	all-electric Spacebus Neo
Double Asteroid Redirection Test	24 Nov 2021	26 Sep 2022			Next-C Ion Engine	Xenon	(United States)	NASA	(United States)	Aerojet Rocketdyne	
Hotbird 13F	15 Oct 2022		Hall effect thruster		PPS5000 (TBC)	Xenon	(France)	Eutelsat	(France)	Snecma (TBC)	all-electric bus Eurostar Neo
Hotbird 13G	3 Nov 2022		Hall effect thruster		PPS5000 (TBC)	Xenon	(France)	Eutelsat	(France)	Snecma (TBC)	all-electric bus Eurostar Neo
MicroHETSat	1 Dec 2023		Hall Effect Thruster		Sitael HT100	Xenon	(Italy)	ESA	(Italy)	Sitael	IOD for HT100
Ionozond (Ionosfera M 1, 2)	4 Nov 2024		Pulsed plasma thruster		APPT-95	PTFE	(Russia)	Roskosmos	(Russia)	RIAME	AOCS
GSAT-20	18 Nov 2024		Hall effect thruster			Xenon	(India)	ISRO	(India)	ISRO	
Tianwen-2	29 May 2026		Ion engine		LIPS-300	Xenon	(China)		(China)	LIP	DFH-5 bus

== Planned missions ==
Planned missions
Spacecraft name	Launch date	Thruster type	Model	Propellant	Spacecraft customer		Thruster prime		Comment
ASTER	2025	Hall effect thruster	PMHT	Xenon	(Brazil)	AEB	(Brazil)	UnB	MetNet bus
ETS-9	2025	Hall effect thruster		Xenon	(Japan)	JAXA	(Japan)	IHI Aerospace	
NASA Gateway	2025	Hall effect thruster		Xenon	(United States)	NASA	(United States)	L3-Aerojet Rocketdyne/Busek	
AQUIS	2025	Vacuum Arc Jet		Tungsten	(Germany)	Space Team Aachen	(Germany)	Space Team Aachen	FEEP in development as upgrade
Soyuz-Sat-O	?	Pulsed plasma thruster	APPT-155	PTFE	(Russia) (Belarus)		(Russia)	RIAME	

== See also ==
- Lists of spacecraft
