= Yamal 203 =

Yamal 203 (Ямал-203)
- Mission type: Communication
- Operator: Gazprom Space Systems
- Mission duration: Cancelled before launch

Spacecraft properties
- Spacecraft: Yamal 203
- Spacecraft type: Yamal 200
- Bus: USP Bus
- Manufacturer: RSC Energia (bus); Alcatel Space (payload)
- Launch mass: 1,351 kg (2,978 lb)
- Power: 3400

Start of mission
- Rocket: Proton-K/Blok-DM-2M
- Launch site: Baikonur Site 81/23

Orbital parameters
- Reference system: GEO
- Longitude: 90°E

Transponders
- Frequency: 9 C band 6 K_{u} band

Yamal 203 (Russian: Ямал-203) was a geostationary communications satellite ordered by Gazkom to RSC Energia. It was to be a twin of Yamal 201 and was supposed to ride along with Yamal 204 on what would have been the third launch of the Yamal program. As a copy of Yamal 201, it would be the second iteration of the USP Bus. It would have been a 1,351 kg (2,978 lb) satellite with 4,080W of power (3.4 kW at end of life) on an unpressurized bus. It would have had eight SPT-70 electric thrusters by OKB Fakel for station keeping. Its payload was 9 C band and 6 K_{u} band transponders to be supplied by Space Systems Loral.

== History ==
During 1997, even before the launch of their first satellites (Yamal 101 and Yamal 102), Gazkom was planning the second generation. At that time they planned 24 satellites of the second generation. This extremely aggressive plan was scaled back by 2001 with a plan to launch four 200 series satellites. The first two, Yamal 201 and Yamal 202 would be launched by 2001 and the second pair, Yamal 203 and Yamal 204 by 2004.

Yamal 201 and Yamal 203 would be identical and be positioned at the 90°E slot and Yamal 202 and Yamal 204 would also be twins and be positioned at the 49°E slot. But the program was delayed and while Yamal 201 and Yamal 202 actually launched on November 24, 2003, Gazkom moved to the Yamal 301 and Yamal 302 project, cancelling both Yamal 203 and Yamal 204.

== See also ==
- Yamal 201 – A twin satellite that was actually launched.
- Yamal – Communication satellite family operated by Gazprom Space Systems.
- Gazprom Space Systems – Satellite communication division of the Russian oil giant Gazprom.
- USP Bus – The satellite bus on which Yamal 203 is based.
- RSC Energia – The designer of the Yamal 203 satellite.
