= Yamal 202 =

Russian communications satellite

Yamal-202
- Names: Ямал-202; Yamal-200 KA-2
- Mission type: Communications
- Operator: Gazprom Space Systems
- COSPAR ID: 2003-053A
- SATCAT no.: 28089
- Website: https://www.gazprom-spacesystems.ru
- Mission duration: 15 years (planned); 21 years, 7 months and 24 days (in progress)

Spacecraft properties
- Spacecraft: Yamal-202
- Spacecraft type: Yamal-200
- Bus: USP Bus
- Manufacturer: RSC Energia (bus); Alcatel Space (payload)
- Launch mass: 1,320 kg (2,910 lb)
- Power: 3.4 kW

Start of mission
- Launch date: 24 November 2003, 06:22:00 UTC
- Rocket: Proton-K / Blok DM-2M
- Launch site: Baikonur, Site 81/23
- Contractor: Khrunichev State Research and Production Space Center
- Entered service: January 2004

Orbital parameters
- Reference system: Geocentric orbit
- Regime: Geostationary orbit
- Longitude: 49° East (2003-2019); 163.5° East (2019-present)

Transponders
- Band: 18 C-band
- Coverage area: Russia

Yamal-202 (Russian: Ямал-202) is a geostationary communications satellite operated by Gazprom Space Systems and built by RSC Energia. It was, along with Yamal-201 the second dual launch of the Yamal program and the second iteration of the USP Bus. It is a 1,320 kg (2,910 lb) satellite with 4,080 watts of power (3.4 kW at end of life) on an unpressurized bus. It has eight SPT-70 electric thrusters by OKB Fakel for station keeping. Its payload is 18 C-band transponders supplied by Space Systems/Loral.

== History ==
During 1997, even before the launch of their first satellites (Yamal-101 and Yamal-102), Gazprom Space Systems was planning the second generation. At that time, they planned a 24 satellites of the second generation. This extremely aggressive plan was scaled back by 2001 with a plan to launch four Yamal-200 series satellites. The first two, Yamal-201 and Yamal-202 would be launched by 2001 and the second pair, Yamal-203 and Yamal-204 by 2004. Yamal-201 and Yamal-203 would be identical and be positioned at the 90° East orbital position and Yamal-202 and Yamal-204 would also be twins and be positioned at the 49° East.

== Launch ==
Yamal-202 was launched, along Yamal-201, on 24 November 2003 at 06:22:00 UTC from Baikonur Site 81/23 by a Proton-K / Blok DM-2M directly to geostationary orbit. The launch and satellite deployment was successful and Yamal-202 was commissioned into service.

== Mission ==
As of 22 July 2016, it is still in service and at 12 years and 8 months.

In 2019, the replacement satellite for "Yamal-202", "Yamal-601" was launched. On 19 July 2019, all the networks working on the satellite "Yamal-202", have been transferred into the satellite "Yamal-601". On 16 September 2019, at the IBC-2019 convention in Amsterdam, the transfer of the Yamal-202 satellite to the orbital position 163.5° East longitude was announced to serve the Pacific region. At the end of November 2019, the movement of the Yamal-202 satellite to the orbital position 163.5° East longitude was successfully completed. After 16 years of working in 49° East position, in 2019 the satellite was transferred to a new orbital position of 163.5° East.

== See also ==
- Yamal-201 – Satellite that was launched together with Yamal-202
- Yamal – Communication satellite family operated by Gazprom Space Systems
- Gazprom Space Systems – Satellite communication division of the Russian oil giant Gazprom
- USP Bus – The satellite bus on which Yamal-202 is based
- RSC Energia – The designer and manufacturer of the Yamal-202 satellite
