= Yamal 201 =

Russian communications satellite

- Names: Ямал-201; Yamal-200 KA-1
- Mission type: Communications
- Operator: Gazprom Space Systems
- COSPAR ID: 2003-053B
- SATCAT no.: 28094
- Website: https://www.gazprom-spacesystems.ru
- Mission duration: 12 years (planned); 10 years, 6.5 months (achieved)

Spacecraft properties
- Spacecraft: Yamal-201
- Spacecraft type: Yamal-200
- Bus: USP Bus
- Manufacturer: RSC Energia (bus); Alcatel Space (payload)
- Launch mass: 1,360 kg (3,000 lb)
- Power: 3.4 kW

Start of mission
- Launch date: 24 November 2003, 06:22:00 UTC
- Rocket: Proton-K / Blok DM-2M
- Launch site: Baikonur, Site 81/23
- Contractor: Khrunichev State Research and Production Space Center
- Entered service: January 2003

End of mission
- Disposal: Graveyard orbit
- Deactivated: 5 June 2014

Orbital parameters
- Reference system: Geocentric orbit
- Regime: Geostationary orbit
- Longitude: 90° East

Transponders
- Band: 15 transponders: 9 C-band; 6 Ku-band
- Coverage area: Russia

Yamal-201 (Russian: Ямал-201) was a geostationary communications satellite operated by Gazprom Space Systems and built by RSC Energia. It was, along with Yamal-202 the second dual launch of the Yamal programme and the second iteration of the USP Bus. It was a 1,360 kg (3,000 lb) satellite with 4,080 watts of power (3.4 kW at end of life) on an unpressurized bus. It had eight SPT-70 electric thrusters by OKB Fakel for station keeping. Its payload was 9 C-band and 6 Ku-band transponders supplied by Space Systems/Loral.

== History ==
During 1997, even before the launch of their first satellites (Yamal-101 and Yamal-102), Gazprom Space Systems was planning the second generation. At that time, they planned a 24 satellites of the second generation. This extremely aggressive plan was scaled back by 2001 with a plan to launch four Yamal-200 series satellites. The first two, Yamal-201 and Yamal-202 would be launched by 2001 and the second pair, Yamal-203 and Yamal-204 by 2004. Yamal-201 and Yamal-203 would be identical and be positioned at the 90° East orbital position and Yamal-202 and Yamal-204 would also be twins and be positioned at the 49° East.

== Launch ==
Yamal-201 was launched, along Yamal 202, on 24 November 2003 at 06:22:00 UTC from Baikonur Site 81/23 by a Proton-K / Blok DM-2M directly to geostationary orbit. The launch and satellite deployment was successful and Yamal-201 was commissioned into service. On 5 June 2014, Yamal-201 failed and the clients had to be moved to other satellites of the network. The satellite lasted 10 years and 6.5 months, short of the design life of 12 years.

== See also ==
- Yamal-202 – Satellite that was launched together with
- Yamal – Communication satellite family operated by Gazprom Space Systems
- Gazprom Space Systems – Satellite communication division of the Russian oil giant Gazprom
- USP Bus – The satellite bus on which Yamal-201 is based
- RSC Energia – The designer and manufacturer of the Yamal-201 satellite
