= Zolana Joao =

Angolan space scientist and engineering manager

- Education: D. Eng
- Alma mater: Tshwane University of Technology, ESIEE Paris, George Washington University School of Engineering and Applied Science
- Occupation: Program Engineering Manager
- Employer: General Manager at GGPEN

Zolana Joao is an Angolan Program Engineering Manager, space scientist, Engineer, and the first General Manager of the Angolan National Space Program Management Office (GGPEN).

== Education ==
Joao earned a Bachelor of Technology in Electrical Engineering from Tshwane University of Technology, dual master's degrees in electrical, electronic, and communication engineering from Tshwane and ESIEE Paris, and a Doctor of Engineering (D. Eng) in Management of complex and large-scale projects from George Washington University.

== Career ==
He served as acting dean, faculty of engineering Methodist University of Angola, a board member of the INACOM, and first general manager the National Space Program Management Office, designing the beginning of the Angolan space program.

For his work in Angolan space initiatives and space diplomacy, Joao was invited to the White House as head of an African Space Agency to be a speaker at the United States–Africa Leaders Summit 2022.

In 2022, Joao oversaw the launch of AngoSat 2, an HTS satellite aiming to bridge the digital divide in Africa. For this, he received the "Space without Borders" medal from Roscosmos.

He led the design and delivery of several remote sensing solutions, and his Tech-Gest solution was awarded in Top 20 excellent projects from the global 100 AI projects for SDG by IRCAI, UNESCO (2022).
