= Yamal-601 =

Russian communications satellite

- Names: Ямал-601
- Mission type: Communications
- Operator: Gazprom Space Systems
- COSPAR ID: 2019-031A
- SATCAT no.: 44307
- Website: https://www.gazprom-spacesystems.ru
- Mission duration: 15 years (planned); 6 years, 5 months and 21 days (in progress)

Spacecraft properties
- Spacecraft: Yamal-601
- Spacecraft type: Yamal-600
- Bus: Spacebus-4000C4
- Manufacturer: Thales Alenia Space
- Launch mass: 5,422 kg (11,953 lb)
- Power: 11 kW

Start of mission
- Launch date: 30 May 2019, 17:42:00 UTC
- Rocket: Proton-M / Briz-M
- Launch site: Baikonur, Site 200/39
- Contractor: Khrunichev State Research and Production Space Center
- Entered service: 19 July 2019

Orbital parameters
- Reference system: Geocentric orbit
- Regime: Geostationary orbit
- Longitude: 49° East

Transponders
- Band: 70 transponders: 38 C-band; 32 Ka-band
- Coverage area: Russia

Yamal-601 (Russian: Ямал-601) is a Russian geostationary communications satellite ordered by Gazprom Space Systems from Thales Alenia Space (TAS) on the Spacebus-4000C4 satellite bus for its Yamal programme. The satellite has mass of 5,422 kg (11,953 lb) and 11 kW of payload power with over 15 years of design life. Its payload was also supplied by Thales Alenia Space and is composed of 38 C-band and 32 Ka-band transponders. It replaced Yamal-202 on 49° East as Yamal-202 was slated to reach its end of service around 2019.

== History ==
In 2013, Gazprom Space Systems Board decided on a new plan. It required two new spacecraft: Yamal-501 and Yamal-601. In January 2014, Gazprom and Thales announced a contract for a new spacecraft, Yamal-601. In 2015, the Yamal-401 history would repeat itself, and the contract of Yamal-601 with Thales was cancelled and was reassigned to ISS Reshetnev, but Thales was again allowed to keep the payload supply. However, in 2016, this decision to give the spacecraft bus development contract to ISS Reshetnev was reversed, and Thales Alenia Space ended up developing and building the whole satellite, bus and payload.

== Launch ==
The satellite was launched on 30 May 2019, at 17:42:00 UTC. On 24 June 2019, the satellite was inserted into nominal geostationary orbit.

== Mission ==
The satellite is intended for the replacement of the Yamal-202 satellite and business development in the Ka-band. On 19 July 2019, the satellite was finally put into operation, transferring all the networks from the Yamal-202 satellite to it.

== See also ==
- Yamal – communication satellite family operated by Gazprom Space Systems
- Gazprom Space Systems – satellite communication division of the Russian oil giant Gazprom
