= José da Rocha =

Angolan politician

José de Carvalho da Rocha is an Angolan politician serving as the governor of the northern province. He served as the Minister of Telecommunications and Information Technologies for 12 years.

== Career ==
Rocha was the Minister of Telecommunications and Information Technologies for 12 years before stepping down in 2020. While serving as minister, he coordinated Angosat project, the first Angolan telecommunications satellite. The communication satellite was launched into space in December 2017 but broke down the next day following the separation of the satellite from the rocket that launched it into orbit. Attempts to re-establish contact with the satellite from direct area of visibility in Russia where it was initially launched into space failed in January 2018.

Rocha was appointed governor of Northern province by president João Lourenço on 10 March 2020 following the death of Sérgio Luther Rescova.
