= AngoSat 1 =

Communications satellite of Angola

- Mission type: Communications
- Operator: Angola Ministry of Telecommunication and Information Technology
- COSPAR ID: 2017-086A
- SATCAT no.: 43087
- Website: http://www.mtti.gov.ao/
- Mission duration: 15 years (planned) (contact lost permanently after 3 days in orbit)

Spacecraft properties
- Spacecraft: AngoSat 1
- Bus: USP Bus
- Manufacturer: RKK Energia
- Launch mass: 1647 kg

Start of mission
- Launch date: 26 December 2017; 19:00:00 UTC
- Rocket: Zenit-3F / Fregat-SB
- Launch site: Baikonur, Site 45/1
- Contractor: Roscosmos
- Entered service: Never (failure in orbit)

End of mission
- Disposal: Derelict (loss of contact)
- Last contact: 29 December 2017

Orbital parameters
- Reference system: GEO
- Longitude: 14° E (planned)

Transponders
- Frequency: 7 K_{u} band and 16 C band

AngoSat 1 was a geostationary communications satellite operated by Angosat and built by the Russian company RKK Energia. It was the first communications satellite of Angola, designed for a 15-year mission to deliver television, internet, and radio services to Angola and other territories. The satellite suffered a power problem in its first hours on orbit and lost contact with its ground control. After the power problem was resolved, contact was reestablished with the satellite, but ultimately it did not recover, and contact was permanently lost 3 days into the mission. After repeated failures to establish contact in the following weeks and months, the satellite was declared lost. Russia financed, built and launched a replacement satellite named AngoSat 2.

== History ==
The project was born out of a 2009 agreement between the governments of Angola and Russia, and work started in 2012. The spacecraft was originally supposed to be launched along the Energia 100 satellite on a Zenit-3SL with SeaLaunch in 2016, but political tensions following the annexation of Crimea and SeaLaunch legal issues made the use of the Ukrainian launcher uncertain. Consequently, the launch was first moved to an Angara A5 / Blok DM-03 configuration, and finally back to a Zenit-3F version which was launched from Baikonur Cosmodrome on 26 December 2017, 19:00:00 UTC. The satellite was financed by Rosoboronexport with a 286.2 million euro loan.

== Payload ==
AngoSat 1 is based on RKK Energia's USP Bus of Gazprom Space Systems' Yamal-heritage. Airbus Defence and Space (formerly Astrium) provided the payload. The satellite is designed for direct insertion into the geostationary orbit by the launch vehicle upper stage and therefore does not feature an apogee engine. The AngoSat 1 payload is composed of 16 C band and 6 K_{u} band transponders supplied by Airbus Defence and Space.

== Demise and replacement ==
On 26 December 2017, RKK Energia announced contact with AngoSat 1 was lost while the satellite was moving to its geostationary orbit due to low onboard batteries. On 27 December 2017, communications had been restored with the satellite after the satellite was properly aligned with the sun to allow the onboard batteries to recharge. On 29 December 2017, Roscosmos and satellite manufacturer RKK Energia confirmed that its onboard systems were in good health.

In the days after the contact was regained with AngoSat-1, the satellite continued drifting westward, according to NORAD data. But independent observers became alarmed, when by mid January, the Angosat had passed over its operational point without any visible attempt to slow down and stop its drift. RKK Energia issued a press release on 15 January 2018, disclosing that the telemetry from the satellite had revealed a problem in the Angosat's power supply system. The company stated that the spacecraft would leave the range of ground control stations before any additional troubleshooting tasks could be attempted. Since the satellite left the communications range of the mission control center in Korolev, the next attempt to contact the satellite and correct the problem took place in April 2018. The satellite failed to respond to signals, and was therefore considered lost.

=== AngoSat 2 ===
The Russian government and RKK Energia agreed to finance and provide a replacement satellite called AngoSat 2, with upgraded capabilities. The new satellite was expected to be completed within 18 months and delivered towards the end of 2019. In the meantime, Russia loaned Angola equivalent communications relay capacity on its existing satellite fleet.

In January 2020, the Angosat-2 project's readiness status was unclear; rumors were published that the construction of the satellite had been taken away from RKK Energia and given to ISS Reshetnev. At the same time, Angolan press reported the satellite being 50% ready. Angosat 2 was launched aboard a Proton-M on 12 October 2022. Angosat-2 has been operational since 23 December 2022.
