= Yamal-300K =

Russian communications satellite

- Names: Ямал-300К; Yamal-300 KA-3
- Mission type: Communications
- Operator: Gazprom Space Systems
- COSPAR ID: 2012-061B
- SATCAT no.: 38978
- Website: https://www.gazprom-spacesystems.ru
- Mission duration: 14 years (planned); 13 years, 1 month and 27 days (in progress)

Spacecraft properties
- Spacecraft: Yamal-300K
- Spacecraft type: Yamal-300
- Bus: Ekspress-1000
- Manufacturer: ISS Reshetnev (bus); Thales Alenia Space (payload)
- Launch mass: 1,870 kg (4,120 lb)
- Power: 5.6 kW

Start of mission
- Launch date: 2 November 2012, 21:04:00 UTC
- Rocket: Proton-M / Briz-M
- Launch site: Baikonur, Site 81/23
- Contractor: Khrunichev State Research and Production Space Center
- Entered service: January 2013

Orbital parameters
- Reference system: Geocentric orbit
- Regime: Geostationary orbit
- Longitude: 90° East (2012-2020); 183° East (2020-present)

Transponders
- Band: 26 transponders: 8 C-band; 18 Ku-band
- Bandwidth: 72 MHz
- Coverage area: Russia

Yamal-300K (Russian: Ямал-300К) is a geostationary communications satellite operated by Gazprom Space Systems and built by ISS Reshetnev on the Ekspress-1000 satellite bus. It was the first switch of satellite supplier in Yamal programme after Gazprom had disagreements on the schedule and cost of Yamal-301 and Yamal-302 with RSC Energia. It is a 1,870 kg (4,120 lb) satellite with 5.6 kW of power on an unpressurized bus designed for direct geostationary orbit injection with 14 years of design life. Its payload was supplied by Thales Alenia Space and is composed of 8 x 72 MHz C-band and 18 x 72 MHz Ku-band transponders for a 36 MHz equivalent of 52 transponders. Its transmitted power is 110 watts in C-band and 140 watts in Ku-band.

== Launch ==
Yamal-300K was launched along Luch 5B on 2 November 2012 at 21:04:00 UTC from Baikonur Site 81/23 by a Proton-M / Briz-M directly to geostationary orbit. The launch and satellite deployment was successful and Yamal-300K was commissioned into service.

== Mission ==
As of 12 May 2020, it is still in service, but has been moved to 183° East (177° West).

== See also ==
- Luch 5B – Satellite that was launched together with Yamal-300K
- Yamal – Communication satellite family operated by Gazprom Space Systems
- Gazprom Space Systems – Satellite communication division of the Russian oil giant Gazprom
- Ekspress (satellite bus) – The satellite bus on which Yamal-300K is based
- ISS Reshetnev – The designer and manufacturer of the Yamal-300K satellite
