= Luch 5A =

Russian Luch relay satellite

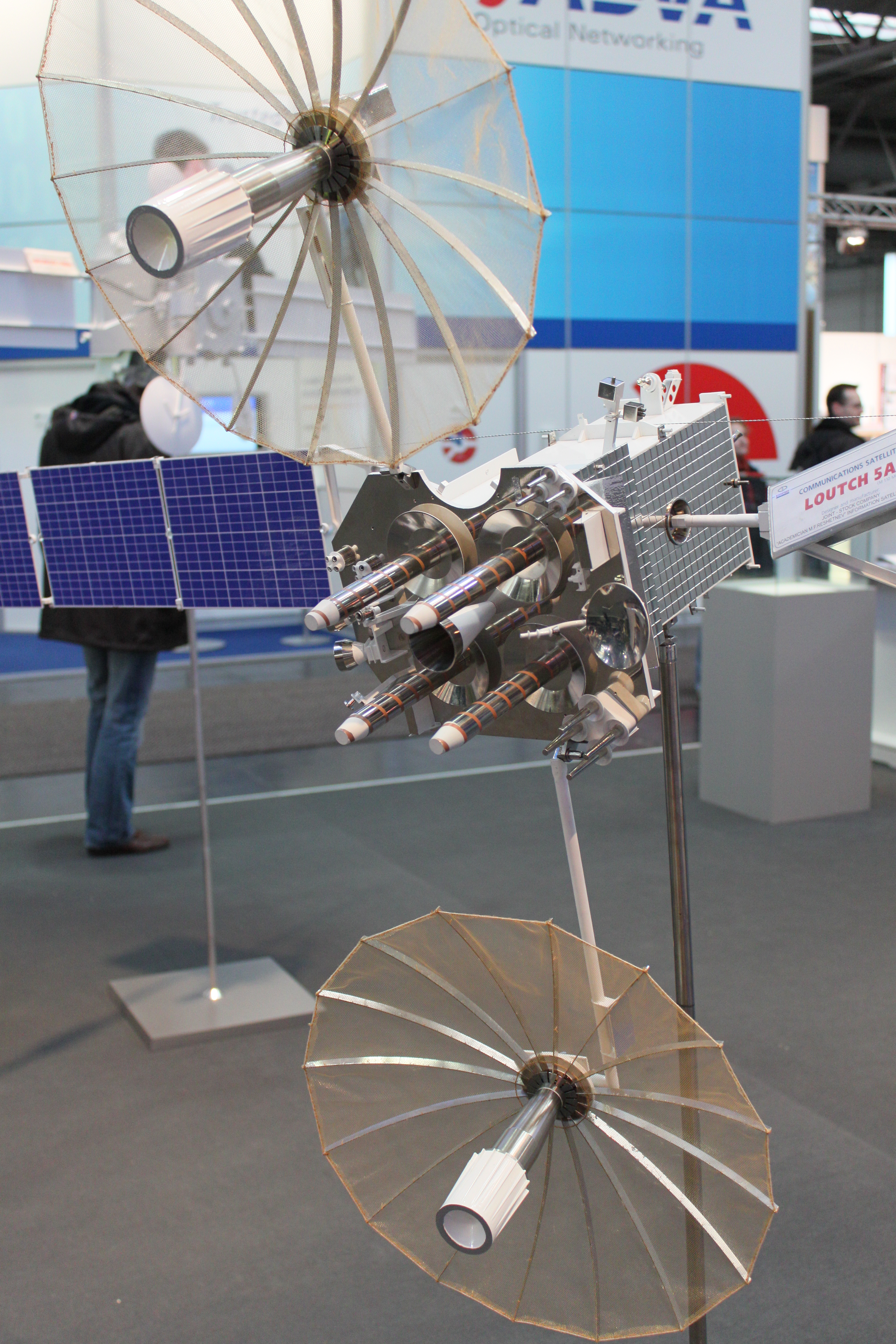
- Model of Luch-5A at CeBIT in 2011
- Mission type: Communications
- Operator: Roskosmos
- COSPAR ID: 2011-074B
- SATCAT no.: 37951
- Mission duration: 10 years

Spacecraft properties
- Bus: Ekspress-1000A
- Manufacturer: JSC Information Satellite Systems
- Launch mass: 1,148 kilograms (2,531 lb)

Start of mission
- Launch date: 11 December 2011, 11:17 UTC
- Rocket: Proton-M/Briz-M
- Launch site: Baikonur 81/24

Orbital parameters
- Reference system: Geocentric
- Regime: Geosynchronous

Luch 5A (Russian: Луч-5А meaning ray and sometimes transliterated as Loutch-5A) is a Russian Luch relay satellite which transmits data from the Russian Orbital Segment of the International Space Station, and from other satellites in low Earth orbit. It is in geosynchronous orbit.

== Luch ==
Luch 5A is one of three Luch relay satellites. Luch 5B was launched on 2 November 2012 and Luch 5V was launched on 28 April 2014. They are dual purpose satellites with both military and civil uses, and are similar to those in the US Tracking and Data Relay Satellite System.

Luch 5A was built by JSC Information Satellite Systems using the Ekspress-1000A bus. It has 6 S and Ku band channels with repeaters manufactured by Thales Alenia Space and other equipment manufactured by Sumitomo. The Ku band antenna operates at up to 150 Mbit/s and the S band antenna at up to 5 Mbit/s. The satellite also relays COSPAS/SARSAT signals and Planet-S System data.

The satellite is designed to relay data from the ISS, satellites in low earth orbit and rocket launch vehicles.

Luch 5A is located at 167° E.

== Launch ==
Luch 5A was launched on 11 December 2011 with satellite Amos-5. The Proton-M rocket with a Briz-M upper stage launched from Baikonur Cosmodrome launchpad 81/24 at 11:17 UTC. After four burns of the Briz-M upper stage it was placed into geosynchronous transfer orbit.
