= Luch 5V =

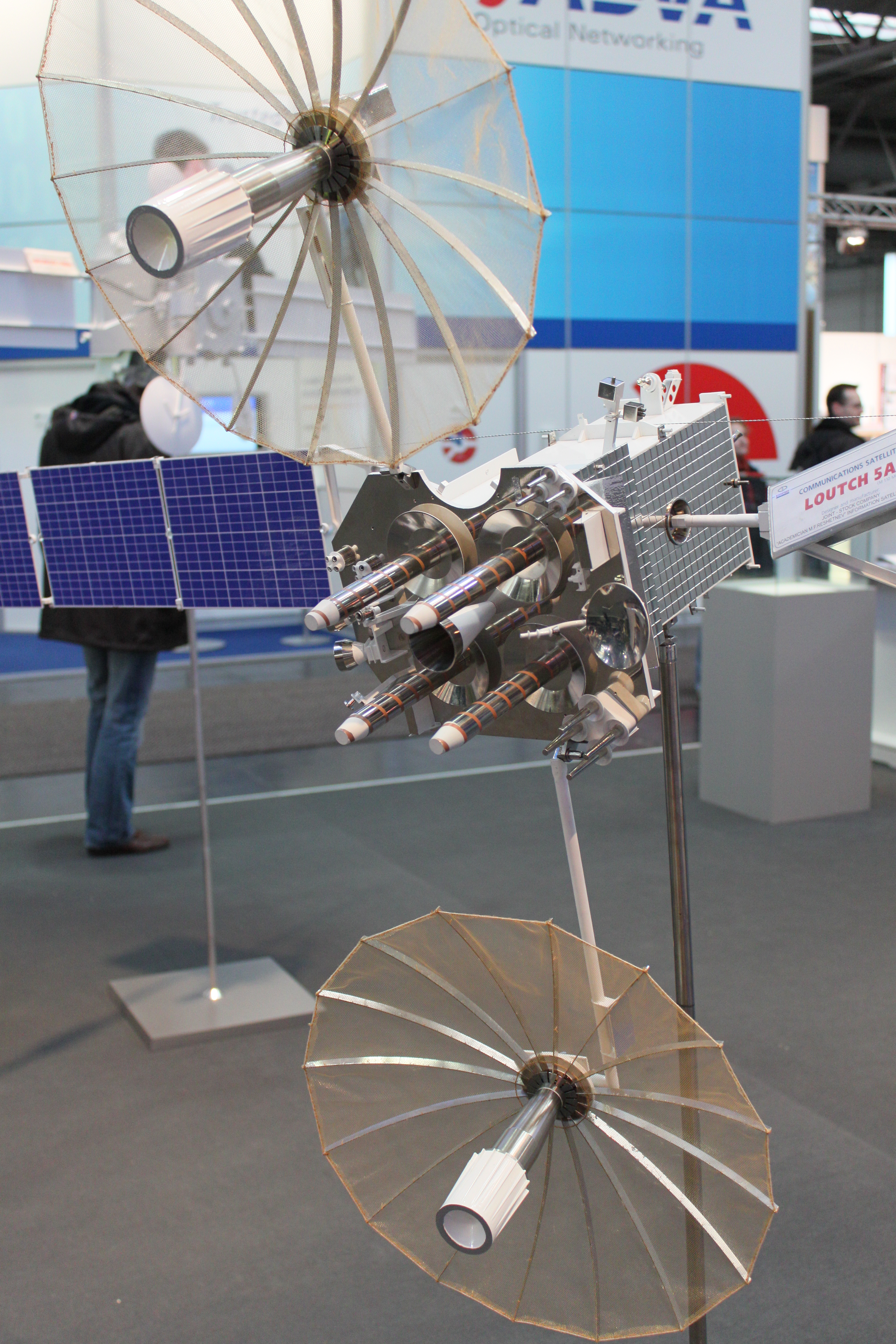
- Model of Luch 5A at CeBIT in 2011
- Mission type: Communications
- Operator: Roskosmos
- COSPAR ID: 2014-023A
- SATCAT no.: 39727
- Mission duration: 10 years

Spacecraft properties
- Bus: Ekspress-1000A
- Manufacturer: JSC Information Satellite Systems
- Launch mass: 1,148 kg (2,531 lb)

Start of mission
- Launch date: 28 April 2014, 04:25 UTC
- Rocket: Proton-M/Briz-M
- Launch site: Baikonur 81/24

Orbital parameters
- Reference system: Geocentric 95° East
- Regime: Geosynchronous

Luch 5V (Russian: Луч-5В meaning ray and sometimes transliterated as Loutch-5V) is a Russian Luch relay satellite which transmits data from the Russian Orbital Segment of the International Space Station, and from other satellites in low Earth orbit. It currently is stationed in the 95° East geosynchronous orbit slot of the Luch network.

== Luch ==
Luch 5V is the third of the MKSR Luch Constellation. Luch 5A was launched on December 11, 2011, and Luch 5B 2 November 2012. They are dual purpose satellites with both military and civil uses, and are similar to those in the US Tracking and Data Relay Satellite System.

Luch 5V was built by JSC Information Satellite Systems using the Ekspress-1000A bus, and is an almost clone of the Luch 5A. The only differences are some structural designs that had to be adapted for its companion to orbit, KazSat-3. It has 6 S and Ku band channels with repeaters manufactured by Thales Alenia Space and other equipment manufactured by Sumitomo. The Ku band antenna operates at up to 150 Mbit/s and the S band antenna at up to 5 Mbit/s. The satellite also relays COSPAS/SARSAT signals and Planet-S System data.

The satellite is designed to relay data from the ISS, the new Soyuz-MS and Progress-MS spacecraft, satellites in low earth orbit and rocket launch vehicles.

== Launch ==
Luch 5V was launched on 28 April 2014 on a dual launch with communication satellite KazSat-3. The Proton-M rocket with a Briz-M upper stage launched from Baikonur Cosmodrome launchpad 81/24 at 04:25 UTC. After five burns of the Briz-M upper stage it was placed into geosynchronous orbit.
