= Olymp-K =

Russian military geostationary satellite

- Mission type: Military, ELINT
- Operator: FSB
- COSPAR ID: 2014-058A
- SATCAT no.: 40258
- Mission duration: 11 years

Spacecraft properties
- Bus: Ekspress-2000
- Manufacturer: JSC Information Satellite Systems
- Launch mass: 3,000 kilograms (6,600 lb)

Start of mission
- Launch date: 28 September 2014, 20:23 UTC
- Rocket: Proton-M/Briz-M
- Launch site: Baikonur 81/24

End of mission
- Disposal: Graveyard orbit
- Deactivated: October 2025

Orbital parameters
- Reference system: Geocentric 167° East
- Regime: Geosynchronous
- Perigee altitude: 35,780 kilometres (22,230 mi)
- Apogee altitude: 35,798 kilometres (22,244 mi)
- Inclination: 0.05 degrees
- Period: 1436.24 minutes
- Epoch: 5 October 2015, 09:00 UTC

Olymp-K (Russian: Олимп-К meaning Olympus) was a Russian geostationary satellite built for the Russian Ministry of Defence and Federal Security Service (FSB). The satellite was also referred to at times as "Luch" (Russian: Луч; lit. Ray, Beam) even though it was not a Luch satellite. The Olymp-K satellite also sometimes went by the name "Olymp-1" (or just "Olymp") and it was assigned code "Kosmos 2501" at one point, before the name Kosmos 2501 was given to an other satellite (a GLONASS satellite). It was believed to be a signals intelligence satellite.

== Launch ==
Olymp-K was launched on 28 September 2014. The Proton-M rocket with a Briz-M upper stage launched from Baikonur Cosmodrome launchpad 81/24 in Kazakhstan at 20:23 UTC. After four burns of the Briz-M upper stage it was placed into geosynchronous transfer orbit. In a press release on 28 September 2014, Roscosmos referred to the satellite as "Luch".

== Manoeuvres ==
Following its launch, the Olymp-K satellite made several manoeuvres before settling at 18.1° West longitude around 4 April 2015. The satellite was then positioned in an orbit directly between Intelsat 901, which was located at 18° West, and Intelsat 7, located at 18.2° West. It remained in geosynchronous orbit between the satellites for five months. At times, Olymp-K performed colocation manoeuvres, positioning itself around 10 kilometres from the satellites. In September 2015, the satellite was manoeuvred to a position at 24.4° West, adjacent to the Intelsat 905 satellite. While JFCC SPACE spokesperson and Air Force Captain Nicholas Mercurio said there were three occasions where the Olymp-K satellite had come within five kilometres of another satellite, an industry source indicated that Air Force data were predictions based on drift rates and that Olymp-K's approach had not brought it closer than 10 kilometres to the Intelsat satellites. According to the head of Russia's Space Policy Institute, the satellite was being moved because of "communications problems". As of December 2019, the satellite was located at 70.6° East Longitude. By summer 2022, it was relocated back to 18°W.

On 7 September 2018, France's Minister of the Armed Forces, Florence Parly, claimed that in 2017 a Luch-Olymp spacecraft had crept close to the Athena-Fidus satellite, a French-Italian satellite launched in 2014 and used for secure military communications and the planning of operations. Parly said, "Trying to listen to one's neighbor is not only unfriendly. It's called an act of espionage."

== Analysis and response ==
Officially Russia made no official claims about the mission of Olymp-K. The satellite was believed to be collecting signals from nearby communications satellites for SIGINT.

Intelsat criticized the manoeuvres, with Intelsat General president Kay Sears saying that "this is not normal behavior and we're concerned." Attempts by Intelsat to contact the owners of the Russian satellite directly and via the US Defense Department did not receive a response. Members of the space community consider the incident to be among the first documented instances of a foreign military satellite approaching a commercial operator in such a manner.

In a 2015 analysis of Russian proximity and rendezvous operations written for the Space Review, Secure World Foundation technical adviser Brian Weeden highlighted Olymp-K's movements. In his paper, he wrote that many Russian space program observers believe the satellite mission involves signals intelligence or communications. Observers also speculated whether there was a connection between Olymp-K and the Yenisey A1 (Luch 4) experimental satellite. A Kommersant report indicated that Olymp-K would provide secure governmental communications as well as electronic intelligence (SIGINT). Sources also reported that the satellite had an onboard laser communications device and would provide the GLONASS system with navigation correction signals.

Olymp-K's maneouvres were reported to have led to several classified meetings within the U.S. Defense Department.

In 2023 Russia launched Luch 5X (Olymp K-2) as Olymp-K's successor.

== End of life ==
Olymp-K was decommissioned and moved to a graveyard orbit above GEO in October 2025.

On 30 January 2026, Olymp-K was observed by Swiss space situational awareness company s2A systems to partially disintegrate in orbit, possibly due to a space debris impact or improper passivation.

== See also ==
- Kosmos 2499
