= National Space Program Management Office =

Coordinates: 8.8197°S 13.2666°E

The National Space Program Management Office (in Portuguese: Gabinete de Gestão do Programa Espacial Nacional, abbreviated GGPEN) is an Angolan government agency responsible for promoting the peaceful use of space and conducting technical space studies. GGPEN was established through the Angola Presidential Decree 154/13, page 2673. The agency's mission is to conduct strategic studies aimed at establishing cooperation agreements with technical and scientific institutions in the space domain and ensuring the creation of national technological and human competencies and the transfer of technology and know-how within the scope of the National Space Program. The Angola National Space Strategy plan for 2016-2025 was approved by the presidential decree n. º 85/17, 10 of May, the strategy is based in the following 5 main pillars:

- Development of space and ground segment
- Human capacity building programs
- Creation and growth of the Angolan space industry
- International affirmation
- Space policy

== Satellite projects ==
GGPEN launched the AngoSat-1 in 2017, which went defunct four months after its launch. AngoSat 2, which is the replacement satellite for AngoSat 1 is currently under development and expected to be launched in 2022. In May 2019, Angola's President, João Lourenço signed another Presidential decree authorizing the National Space Program Management to sign contract on behalf of Angola for the manufacture of AngoSat-3 to be built by Airbus. The decree is Series I, number 62/19, dated of May 8, 2019.

== Other projects ==
In November 2019, the agency launched a drought monitoring project alongside the Angolan Ministry of Telecommunications and Information and Social Communication Technologies in a bid to tackle drought issues in the country. Angola is also leading the Southern Africa Development Community (SADC) satellite shared network project with the objective of providing quality telecommunications services at affordable prices.

== Trainings ==
The agency organizes several trainings and capacity development programs to strengthen its workforce. It had a training on small satellite development in May 2019, and organized training with the International Telecommunication Union (ITU) and SADC on Satellite Applications Training in January 2020. In 2019, the agency sent six students for master's degree in space science and technology at ISAE-SUPAERO through capacity development program for AngoSat-2. The students are to learn from the construction of the Angosat-2 payload and the construction of the AngoSat-3 satellite. The agency launched the AngoSat Educa mobile app for space education and outreach in 2018 and has also adopted the use of comic books to educate young students in the country about space science and technology. These trainings have led to the incubation of ten startups by GGPEN that are contributing to the growth of space science and technology in Angola.
