= Lira (ISS) =

The Lira system (Russian: Лира) is a two-way communication system used between the International Space Station and Mission Control via the Russian Luch relay satellite constellation including the four first generation Altair satellites and the second generation Gelios satellite. The Russian Orbital Segment (ROS) communication Subsystems can receive commands directly from ground stations through the Regul Subsystem and can receive commands from the LUCH satellite through the Lira or the Regul System.

The Lira antenna and associated electronics were part of the Zvezda module which was launched in July 2000. Due to issues with the Luch satellite system communications from the Russian Orbital Segment was routed through a mix of direct connection to ground stations via the Regul system and the NASA Tracking and Data Relay Satellite System. Additional Luch satellites were launched between 2011 and 2014 but the system was unable to reach full functionality until a spacewalk in February 2018 to replace electronics was completed.
