= Yamal (satellite constellation) =

Russian satellite constellation

Yamal (Russian: Яма́л) is a communication and broadcasting system developed and operated by Gazprom Space Systems. Born out of the connectivity needs of the natural gas extraction giant Gazprom, the system was spun off in its own company, and opened the network to third parties and even went into the public broadcasting industry. Yamal and Russian Satellite Communications Company (RSCC)'s Ekspress constellation are the only two national satellite operators in Russia.

== History ==
During 1997, even before the launch of their first satellites (Yamal 101 and Yamal 102), Gazkom was planning the second generation. At that time, they planned 24 satellites of the second generation. This extremely aggressive plan was scaled back by 2001 with a plan to launch four 200 series satellites. The first two, Yamal 201 and Yamal 202 planned to be launched by 2001 and the second pair, Yamal 203 and Yamal 204 by 2004. Yamal 201 and Yamal 203 were identical and be positioned at the 90° East orbital position and Yamal 202 and Yamal 204 were also twinned and be positioned at the 49° East position.

Yamal 101 and Yamal 102 were launched together on 6 September 1999 at 16:36:00 UTC from Baikonur Site 81/23 by a Proton-K / Blok DM-2M directly to geostationary orbit (GEO). But a failure in the electrical system at solar panel deployment meant that Yamal 101 was lost right after the successful launch. Thus, Gazkom registered Yamal 102 as Yamal 101. This has caused significant confusion but the records are clear that the satellite that failed was, in fact, the original Yamal 101.

Yamal 201 and Yamal 202 were launched on 24 November 2003 at 06:22:00 UTC from Baikonur Site 81/23 by a Proton-K / Blok DM-2M directly to geostationary orbit. The launch and satellite deployment was successful and both were commissioned into service.

By 2007, the program delays made Gazkom move to the Yamal 301 and Yamal 302 project, cancelling both Yamal 203 and Yamal 204. Those were more advanced versions of the spacecraft they would have to replace. But by early 2008, Energia and Gazkom enter into a disagreement over the cost and schedule of Yamal 301 and Yamal 302, which was even submitted to arbitrage. In the end, the contract with Energia is cancelled and a new Yamal-300K is hastily ordered from ISS Reshetnev for a 2009 launch date.

In February 2009, Gazprom Space Systems announced a contract with Thales Alenia Space for two satellites: Yamal-401 and Yamal-402. This was the first time a foreign supplier would build a satellite for domestic Russian market. After much lobby from Russian industry, the contract for the bus and integration of Yamal-401 is cancelled and awarded to ISS Reshetnev, but Thales is allowed to keep the payload supply.

Yamal 102, on 9 August 2010, was decommissioned and sent to a graveyard orbit. The satellite lasted 4079 days (11 years and 2 months), a bit short of the design life of 12.5 years.

Yamal-300K was launched along Luch 5B 2 November 2012, at 21:04:00 UTC from Baikonur Site 81/23 by a Proton-M / Briz-M directly to geostationary orbit. The launch and satellite deployment was successful and Yamal-300K was commissioned into service.

On 8 December 2012, at 13:13:43 UTC, a Proton-M / Briz-M launches Yamal-402 to a geostationary transfer orbit (GTO). The same day, Khrunichev State Research and Production Space Center and International Launch Services (ILS) reported an anomaly during the launch in which the Briz-M stage failed 4 minutes before scheduled shut down on its fourth burn. On 10 December 2012, specialists from Thales Alenia Space carried out maneuvers to bring the satellite into its designated orbit after a premature separation from Briz-M. On 15 December 2012, Yamal-402 was taken to its planned geostationary orbit at the altitude of 36,000 km following a series of four adjustment operations. The satellite lost 4 years of fuel to compensate for lower than expected orbit injection.

In 2013, Gazprom Board decides a new plan. It requires two new satellites: Yamal-501 and Yamal-601. It also calls for a new seven spacecraft observation constellation of optical and radar low Earth orbit satellites called SMOTR. And also requires for Gazprom Space Systems to develop its own satellite design and manufacturing capabilities.

In 2014, Gazprom announces a contract with Thales Alenia Space for a new satellite, Yamal-601. On 5 June 2014, Yamal 201 failed and the clients had to be moved to other satellites of the network. The satellite lasted 3846 days (10 years and 6.5 months), short of the design life of 12.5 years. On 15 December 2014, at 00:16:00 UTC a Proton-M / Briz-M launches Yamal-401 directly to geostationary orbit. The launch is successful and the spacecraft is accepted into service.

In 2015, history has repeated itself and the contract of Yamal-601 with Thales is cancelled and is assigned to ISS Reshetnev, but Thales is allowed to keep the payload supply, again. As a result of another change of decision, Thales Alenia Space was entrusted with the construction of the Yamal-601 entire system (satellite bus + payload). In the end, Thales Alenia Space developed and built the whole Yamal-601 satellite, both satellite bus and payload.

== Yamal satellite series ==
Satellite	Bus	Payload	Order	Launch	Launch Vehicle	Intended Orbit	Launch Result	Launch Weight	Status	Remarks
Yamal 101	RSC Energia; USP	Space Systems/Loral		1999-09-06	Proton-K / Blok DM-2M	Geostationary orbit	Success	1,360 kg (3,000 lb)	Failed at deployment	Dual launch with Yamal 102. Failed at solar panel deployment.
Yamal 102	RSC Energia; USP	Space Systems/Loral		1999-09-06	Proton-K / Blok DM-2M	Geostationary orbit	Success	1,360 kg (3,000 lb)	Retired on 9 August 2010	Dual launch with Yamal 101.
Yamal 201	RSC Energia; USP	Alcatel Space	2001	2003-11-24	Proton-K / Blok DM-2M	Geostationary orbit	Success	1,360 kg (3,000 lb)	Failed on 5 June 2014	Dual launch with Yamal 202. Failed on orbit.
Yamal 202	RSC Energia; USP	Alcatel Space	2001	2003-11-24	Proton-K / Blok DM-2M	Geostationary orbit	Success	1,320 kg (2,910 lb)	Operational	In November 2019, after 16 years of working in 49° East position the satellite was transferred to a new orbital position of 163.5° East. Dual launch with Yamal 201.
Yamal-300K	Ekspress-1000HTA		2009	2012-11-02	Proton-M / Briz-M	Geostationary orbit	Success	1,870 kg (4,120 lb)	Operational	Launched along Luch 5B.
Yamal-402	Spacebus-4000C3	Thales Alenia Space	2009	2012-12-08	Proton-M / Briz-M	Geostationary orbit	Partial failure	5,250 kg (11,570 lb)	Operational	Satellite lost 4 years of fuel to compensate for lower than expected orbit injection.
Yamal-401	Ekspress-2000	Thales Alenia Space	2010	2014-12-15	Proton-M / Briz-M	Geostationary orbit	Success	2,976 kg (6,561 lb)	Operational	Replaced a cancelled satellite. The satellite that this satellite replaced was also named Yamal-401.
Yamal-601	Spacebus-4000C4	Thales Alenia Space	2015	2019-05-30	Proton-M / Briz-M	Geostationary orbit	Success	5,700 kg (12,600 lb)	Operational	See the other Yamal-601 entry for more information about the Yamal-601 satellite project
Yamal-501	—N/a		—N/a	2026	Proton-M / Briz-M	Geostationary orbit	Planned	—N/a	Planned	

=== Cancelled satellites ===
Satellite	Bus	Payload	Order	Launch	Launch Vehicle	Intended Orbit	Launch Result	Launch Weight	Status	Remarks
Yamal-601	Ekspress-2000		2015	Cancelled	Proton-M / Briz-M	Geostationary orbit	Cancelled	—N/a	Cancelled	Originally, the build of Yamal-601 satellite was contracted to Thales Alenia Space. Then, a change was investigated; namely, the build of the satellite's bus was suggested to be given to ISS Reshetnev, with Thales Alenia Space still providing the payload. This new Reshetnev-developed satellite (which is the satellite this table entry is about) was to be called also Yamal-601. But in the end, these plans were cancelled (thus the satellite of this entry is labeled as cancelled) and Thales Alenia Space developed an built the satellite as originally planned (see the other Yamal-601 entry which is labeled success).
Yamal 203	RSC Energia; USP	Alcatel Space	2001	Cancelled	Proton-K / Blok DM-2M	Geostationary orbit	Cancelled	1,360 kg (3,000 lb)	Cancelled	
Yamal 204	RSC Energia; USP	Alcatel Space	2001	Cancelled	Proton-K / Blok DM-2M	Geostationary orbit	Cancelled	1,320 kg (2,910 lb)	Cancelled	
Yamal 301	RSC Energia; USP	NEC Toshiba Space/Tesat Spacecom	2003	Cancelled	Proton-M / Blok DM-03	Geostationary orbit	Cancelled	1,330 kg (2,930 lb)	Cancelled	
Yamal 302	RSC Energia; USP	NEC Toshiba Space/Tesat Spacecom	2003	Cancelled	Proton-M / Blok DM-03	Geostationary orbit	Cancelled	1,330 kg (2,930 lb)	Cancelled	
Yamal-401	Spacebus-4000C3	Thales Alenia Space	2009	Cancelled	Proton-M / Briz-M	Geostationary orbit	Cancelled	4,900 kg (10,800 lb)	Cancelled	Was cancelled. This satellite's role was replaced by another, later satellite that also was named Yamal-401.

== See also ==
- Telecommunications in Russia
- Gazprom Space Systems – Satellite communication division of the Russian oil giant Gazprom and owner of the Yamal system
- Russian Satellite Communications Company – Satellite communication company of the Ministry of Telecom and Mass Communications of the Russian Federation and the only other Russian satellite operator
