= Luch (satellite) =

Russian data relay system

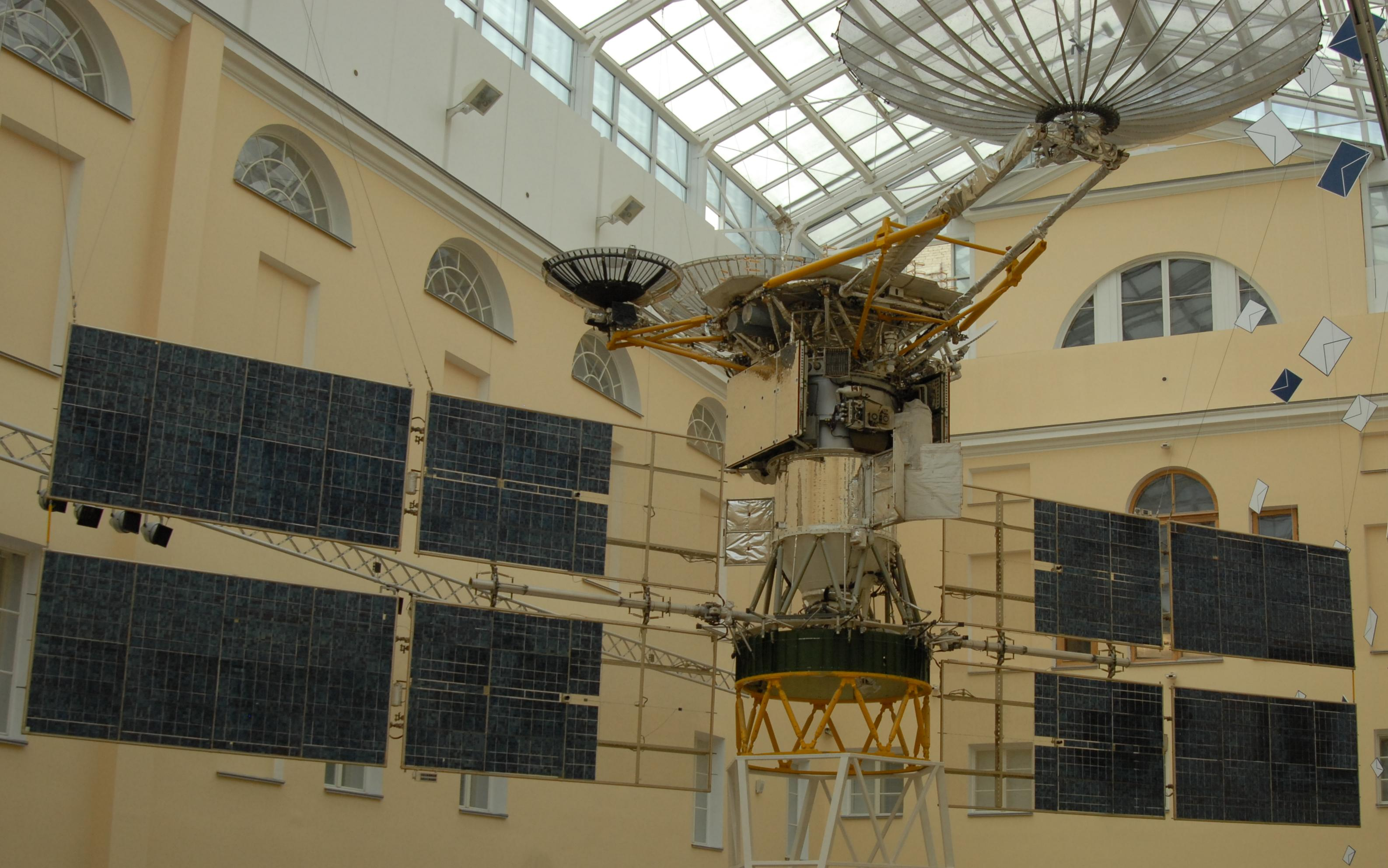
- Luch 15 (Altair 15L) in the A.S. Popov Central Museum of Communications in Saint Petersburg, Russia
- Manufacturer: NPO-PM
- Country of origin: Russia
- Applications: To transmit live TV images, communications and other telemetry

Specifications
- Spacecraft type: Satellite
- Dry mass: 2.4 metric tons
- Power: 1.8 kW

The Luch (Russian: Луч; lit. Ray) Satellite Data Relay Network (SDRN), also referred to as Altair and Gelios, is a series of geosynchronous Russian relay satellites, used to transmit live TV images, communications and other telemetry from the Soviet/Russian space station Mir, the Russian Orbital Segment (ROS) of the International Space Station and other orbital spacecraft to the Earth, in a manner similar to that of the US Tracking and Data Relay Satellite System.

== First generation ==
Conceptual drawing of a Luch geosynchronous satellite, referred to in the West as "Altair/SR relay satellite". It was designed for voice and data relay with the Mir space station, in what was called the Satellite Data Relay Network (SDRN).

The first generation of satellites was created by NPO-PM using the satellite platform KAUR-4 (its first use) and had the code name "Altair" (index GUKOS - 11F669). The system was conceived as part of the second generation of the Global Satellite Data Relay Network (Глобальная Космическая Командно-Ретрансляционная система (GKKRS)) and was developed by decree of the Soviet Council of Ministers of February 17, 1976 (the other part of this decree authorized the construction of geostationary system "Geyser"). Five satellites have been built on this platform, but only four have been launched: Kosmos 1700, Kosmos 1897, Kosmos 2054 and Luch-1, none of which are currently operational. The fifth satellite has been, due to lack of funds for the launcher, donated to the A.S. Popov Central Museum of Communications in Saint Petersburg, Russia.

=== Platform design ===
Each satellite has a mass of 2.4 metric tons and featured two photovoltaic arrays, providing 1.8 kW of power. Three large antennas and numerous, small helical antennas permitted data relays in the 15/14, 15/11, and 0.9/0.7 GHz bands.

== Second generation ==
In the second generation of the satellites, code named "Gelios", several improvements had been introduced, but due to lack of funds, only one satellite built on this platform has been launched: Luch-2 1 (Gelios-12L) on September 11, 1995 – it stopped working in 1998.

== Third generation - MKSR Luch Constellation ==
Originally, during 2009, the Russian Federal Space Agency signed a contract with JSC Information Satellite Systems (previously "NPO-PM") for development of a new generation of satellites, Luch-4, Luch-5A and Luch-5B. It enabled the rebuild of the Luch network and provided the ROS with 45 minutes of coverage per orbit via the Lira and Regul communications systems. Luch-4 was based on the heavier Ekspress-2000 satellite platform, while the Luch-5A and Luch-5B was based on the lighter Ekspress-1000 and flew with companion satellites on Proton-M/Briz-M. That plan was suspended and the MKSR Luch Constellation was defined. It replaced the heavier and more expensive Luch-4 and added a twin of the Luch-5A, the Luch-5V. The three orbital position used by this system was 95° east over the Indian Ocean, 16° west, over the Atlantic Ocean and 167° east over the Pacific Ocean. The positions were assigned to the Luch-5V, Luch-5B and Luch-5A respectively.

Luch 5A arrived at Baikonur on November 10, 2011, and was launched on December 11, 2011, along AMOS-5. Luch 5B went through vacuum thermal testing during May 2012 and was launched on November 3, 2012, along Yamal-300K. Luch 5V was launched on April 28, 2014, along KazSat-3.

During 2013 a military communication satellite was identified as both Luch and Olymp, and later named Olymp-K, was manifested to fly on the Proton-M. It launched successfully on a Proton-M/Briz-M on September 28, 2014. It is known to be based on the USP platform, to be designed for a 15-year life on GEO, to have a laser communications terminal, to use Hall thrusters and is considered to also have a SIGINT payload.

On the 9 October 2015, spacenews.com reported that in April 2015, Olymp-K had moved within 10 kilometres (6.2 mi) of the Intelsat communications spacecraft Intelsat 901 and the nearby Intelsat 7, causing concerns of a safety-of-flight incident. Attempts by Intelsat to contact the Russian satellite's operators were not successful, and no reason for the satellite's movement was given by the Russian government. The move sparked classified meetings within the Department of Defense.

The Luch-4 is speculated to have mutated into the Yenisey A1. It will be mostly a demonstration spacecraft for new technologies, particularly large diameter unfurlable antenna reflectors and use of electric propulsion for orbit raising maneuvers.

The new Progress-MS and Soyuz-MS will have a Unified Command Telemetry System (UCTS) that will make extensive use of the Luch and GLONASS networks to have real-time telemetry and control of the spacecraft even when not overflying a ground radio station.
