= Yamal-402 =

Russian communications satellite

- Names: Ямал-402; Yamal-400 KA-2
- Mission type: Communications
- Operator: Gazprom Space Systems
- COSPAR ID: 2012-070A
- SATCAT no.: 39022
- Website: https://www.gazprom-spacesystems.ru
- Mission duration: 15 years (planned before launch); 11 years (planned after launch); 12 years, 3 months and 17 days (in progress)

Spacecraft properties
- Spacecraft: Yamal-402
- Spacecraft type: Yamal-400
- Bus: Spacebus-4000C3
- Manufacturer: Thales Alenia Space
- Launch mass: 5,250 kg (11,570 lb)
- Power: 10.8 kW

Start of mission
- Launch date: 8 December 2012, 13:13:43 UTC
- Rocket: Proton-M / Briz-M
- Launch site: Baikonur, Site 200/39
- Contractor: Khrunichev State Research and Production Space Center
- Entered service: February 2013

Orbital parameters
- Reference system: Geocentric orbit
- Regime: Geostationary orbit
- Longitude: 55° East

Transponders
- Band: 46 Ku-band)
- Coverage area: Russia

Yamal-402 (Russian: Ямал-402) is a Russian geostationary communications satellite. It was launched on 8 December 2012, 13:13:43 UTC from Site 200/39 at the Baikonur Cosmodrome in Kazakhstan. It was built by Thales Alenia Space, and is based on the Spacebus-4000C3 satellite bus. It is equipped with 46 Ku-band) transponders. It has a design life of 15 years, but reducing to 11 years expected after launch partial failure.

== History ==
In February 2009, Gazprom Space Systems announced a contract with Thales Alenia Space for two satellites: Yamal-401 and Yamal-402. This was the first time a foreign supplier would build a satellite for the domestic Russian market. After much lobby from Russian industry, the contract for the bus and integration of Yamal-401 was cancelled and awarded to ISS Reshetnev, but Thales was allowed to keep the payload supply.

== Launch problem ==
On 6 November 2012, the satellite arrives at the launch site of Baikonur. On 8 December 2012, at 13:13:43 UTC, a Proton-M / Briz-M launches Yamal-402 to a geostationary transfer orbit (GTO). The same day, Khrunichev State Research and Production Space Center and International Launch Services (ILS) reported an anomaly during the launch in which the Briz-M stage failed 4 minutes before scheduled shut down on its fourth burn.

On 10 December 2012, specialists from Thales Alenia Space carried out maneuvers to bring the satellite into its designated orbit after a premature separation from Briz-M. On 15 December 2012, Yamal-402 was taken to its planned geostationary orbit at the altitude of 36,000 km following a series of four adjustment operations.

== Mission ==
The satellite lost 4 years of fuel to compensate for lower than expected orbit injection.

== See also ==
- Yamal – Communication satellite family operated by Gazprom Space Systems
- Gazprom Space Systems – Satellite communication division of the Russian oil giant Gazprom
- Spacebus (satellite bus) – Satellite platform on which Yamal-402 is based
- Thales Alenia Space – Satellite bus and payload designer and manufacturer
