= Yamal-401 =

Russian communications satellite

- Names: Ямал-401; Yamal-400 KA-1
- Mission type: Communications
- Operator: Gazprom Space Systems
- COSPAR ID: 2014-082A
- SATCAT no.: 40345
- Website: https://www.gazprom-spacesystems.ru
- Mission duration: 15 years (planned); 10 years, 10 months and 6 days (in progress)

Spacecraft properties
- Spacecraft: Yamal-401
- Spacecraft type: Yamal-400
- Bus: Ekspress-2000
- Manufacturer: ISS Reshetnev (bus); Thales Alenia Space (payload)
- Launch mass: 2,976 kg (6,561 lb)
- Power: 10.6 kW

Start of mission
- Launch date: 15 December 2014, 00:16:00 UTC
- Rocket: Proton-M / Briz-M
- Launch site: Baikonur, Site 81/24
- Contractor: Khrunichev State Research and Production Space Center
- Entered service: February 2015

Orbital parameters
- Reference system: Geocentric orbit
- Regime: Geostationary orbit
- Longitude: 90° East

Transponders
- Band: 53 transponders: 17 C-band; 36 Ku-band
- Coverage area: Russia

Yamal-401 (Russian: Ямал-401) is a Russian geostationary communications satellite operated by Gazprom Space Systems. It was built by ISS Reshetnev and is based on the Ekspress-2000 satellite bus. It is equipped with 17 C-band and 36 Ku-band transponders. It has a design life of 15 years.

== Development history ==
In February 2009, Gazprom ordered two Yamal-400 type satellites from Thales Alenia Space. The satellites were named Yamal-401 and Yamal-402. Thales Alenia Space was to be responsible for all aspects of the development and building of the satellites. Both satellites were to be based on Spacebus4000C3 satellite buses.

However, in 2010, Gazprom changed their satellite order so that the Yamal-401 satellite would be developed by ISS Reshetnev and be based on their Ekspress-2000 satellite bus. Thales Alenia Space would deliver the payload for Yamal-401 as originally agreed (also, no changes on the payload side of things). There were no changes with the Yamal-402 satellite, with Thales Alenia developing and building the whole satellite as originally planned.

Originally, both Yamal-401 and Yamal-402 were to be launched by Ariane 5, but the launches were changed to Proton-M launch vehicles.

== Launch ==
International Launch Services (ILS) was contracted to launch Yamal-401, using a Proton-M / Briz-M launch vehicle. The launch took place from Site 81/24 at the Baikonur Cosmodrome, at 00:16:00 UTC on 15 December 2014. The satellite was deployed into the planned geostationary transfer orbit (GTO).

== See also ==
- Yamal – Communication satellite family operated by Gazprom Space Systems
- Gazprom Space Systems – Satellite communication division of the Russian oil giant Gazprom
- Ekspress (satellite bus) – The satellite bus on which Yamal-401 is based
- ISS Reshetnev – The designer and manufacturer of the Yamal-401 satellite's bus
