= Energia-100 =

Communications Satellite

Energia-100 (Энергия-100)
- Mission type: Communication
- Operator: Rostelecom

Spacecraft properties
- Spacecraft: Energia-100
- Bus: USP Bus
- Manufacturer: RSC Energia

Start of mission
- Launch date: Planned: TBD
- Rocket: Soyuz-2.1b / Fregat
- Launch site: Vostochny Cosmodrome
- Contractor: Roscosmos

Orbital parameters
- Reference system: GEO

Transponders
- Band: K_{a} band 100 Gbps

Energia-100 (Russian: Энергия-100) is a planned geostationary communications satellite built by the Russian company RSC Energia for its subsidiary Energia-Telecom (Russian: Энергия-Телеком). The whole bandwidths has been leased to the JSC RTComm.RU (Russian: АО РТКомм.РУ) subsidiary of Rostelecom. Initially, it was planned to be launched in 2018 by a Soyuz-2.1b/Fregat rocket from the Vostochny Cosmodrome.

== Payload ==
While still based on the USP Bus, the payload is one of the high throughput K_{a} band that offers 100 Gbit/s of bandwidth. It has been stated that it is equivalen to 1,500 transponders of low bandwidth band.

== See also ==
- High-throughput satellite – Type of communication satellite.
- ViaSat-1 – A high bandwidth K_{a} band satellite.
- EchoStar XVII – A high bandwidth K_{a} band satellite.
