= AngoSat 2 =

Communications satellite of Angola

- Mission type: Communications
- Operator: Ministry of Telecommunication and Information Technology of Angola
- COSPAR ID: 2022-131A
- SATCAT no.: 54033
- Website: http://www.mtti.gov.ao/
- Mission duration: 15 years (planned)

Spacecraft properties
- Spacecraft: AngoSat 2
- Bus: Ekspress-1000
- Manufacturer: RKK Energia
- Launch mass: 1964 kg
- Dry mass: 263 kg
- Payload mass: 1647 kg
- Power: 2 deployable solar arrays, batteries (4,400 Watts)

Start of mission
- Launch date: 12 October 2022; 15:00 UTC
- Rocket: Proton-M No. 93571 / Block DM-03 No. 6L
- Launch site: Baikonur, Site 81/24
- Contractor: Roscosmos

Orbital parameters
- Reference system: GEO
- Longitude: 23° E

Transponders
- Frequency: 24 K_{u} band; 6 C band; 1 K_{a} band

AngoSat 2 is an Angolan geostationary communications satellite that is designed to provide telecommunications and broadcasting services to Angola and the surrounding regions. It is the successor to the AngoSat 1 satellite, which was launched in 2017 but experienced technical difficulties and was declared dead and a total loss. AngoSat-2 was developed to replace AngoSat-1 and to enhance Angola's communication infrastructure.

== Development and construction ==
AngoSat-2 was developed as a joint venture between the Angolan government and Russia. The project was overseen by the Ministry of Telecommunications and Information Technology of Angola, in partnership with RSC Energia, a Russian aerospace company. The satellite was constructed by RSC Energia at its facilities in Russia.

The development and construction of AngoSat-2 involved collaboration between Angolan and Russian engineers and scientists. The satellite was designed to be compatible with the Proton-M or Breeze-M launch vehicle, which is capable of placing the satellite into geostationary orbit.

== Specifications ==
The payload of Angosat-2 consists of two telecommunications payloads:

- A C band payload with 12 transponders, which will be used for fixed and mobile communications, as well as for digital television broadcasting.
- A Ku band payload with 16 transponders, which will be used for broadband internet access.

The total payload mass of Angosat-2 is 1,647 kilograms. The satellite is designed to have a service life of 15 years.

== Launch and deployment ==
AngoSat-2 was launched on 12 October 2022 from the Baikonur Cosmodrome in Kazakhstan. The satellite was deployed into a Geostationary transfer orbit (GTO) using a Proton-M/Breeze-M launch vehicle. After reaching the GTO, onboard propulsion systems were used to maneuver AngoSat-2 into its final geostationary orbit, where it will remain stationary relative to Earth's surface. It reached its final position (23E) on 3 November 2022.

== See also ==
- AngoSat 1
- National Space Program Management Office (GGPEN)
- Energia (corporation)
- Roscosmos
