= USP (satellite bus) =

USP (УКП)
- Manufacturer: RSC Energia
- Country of origin: Russia
- Applications: Communications,

Specifications
- Spacecraft type: LEO to GEO universal platform
- Dry mass: 950 kg (2,090 lb) to 1,200 kg (2,600 lb)
- Payload capacity: HEO: 500 kg (1,100 lb) to 1,000 kg (2,200 lb); GEO 250 kg (550 lb) to 300 kg (660 lb)
- Power: HEO up to 3000W; GEO up to 2000W
- Batteries: NiH_{2}
- Regime: LEO, HEO and GEO
- Design life: HEO >= 7 years GEO >=12.5 years

Production
- Status: In Production
- On order: 12
- Built: 7
- Launched: 7
- Operational: 3
- Retired: 1
- Failed: 2
- Lost: 1
- Maiden launch: September 06, 1999, Yamal 101 and Yamal 102
- Last launch: Dec 26, 2017, Angosat 1

The USP, for Universal Space Platform (Russian: Универсальная Космическая Платформа, romanized: Universal'naya Kosmicheskaya Platforma; Russian: УКП, romanized: UKP), also known as Viktoria (Виктория), is a highly flexible satellite bus designed and manufactured by RSC Energia. It is called universal because it has been designed to be operated from LEO to GEO. It is a three axis stabilized platform with electric propulsion for station keeping, but chemical propellant is offered as an option. The bus can offer up to 3000 W of power and a payload capacity up to 1,000 kg (2,200 lb) for Low Earth orbit or HEO an up to 300 kg (660 lb) for geostationary orbit.

The platform is designed for direct orbital injection, and thus lacks orbit raising propulsion. It does however, support dual launching on Proton-M, which can enable cheap launching, or the use of smaller vehicles like the Soyuz-2.1b/Fregat-M or even the Dnepr for low energy orbits.

== List of USP bus satellites ==
While not the most successful satellite bus, the USP is characterized by its commercial beginnings and the huge orbital flexibility.

Satellite	Order	Launch	Launch Vehicle	Launch site	Intended Orbit	Launch Result	Launch Weight	Status	Remarks
Yamal 101	—N/a	1999-09-06	Proton-K/Blok-DM-2M	Baikonur Site 81/23	GEO	Success	1,360 kg (3,000 lb)	Failed at separation	Dual launch with Yamal 102. Failed at launch
Yamal 102	—N/a	1999-09-06	Proton-K/Blok-DM-2M	Baikonur Site 81/23	GEO	Success	1,360 kg (3,000 lb)	Retired on August 9, 2010	Dual launch with Yamal 101.
Yamal 201	2001	2003-11-24	Proton-K/Blok-DM-2M	Baikonur Site 81/23	GEO	Success	1,360 kg (3,000 lb)	Failed on June 5, 2014	Dual launch with Yamal 202. Failed on orbit
Yamal 202	2001	2003-11-24	Proton-K/Blok-DM-2M	Baikonur Site 81/23	GEO	Success	1,320 kg (2,910 lb)	Operational	Dual launch with Yamal 201
BelKa 1	2003	2006-07-26	Dnepr	Baikonur Site 109/95	SSO	Failure	750 kg (1,650 lb)	Launch failure	
Tundra L11	2007	2015-11-17	Soyuz-2.1b/Fregat-M	Plesetsk Site 43/4	HEO	Success	—N/a	Operational	
Tundra L12	2007	2017-05-25	Soyuz-2.1b/Fregat-M	Plesetsk Site 43/4	HEO	Success	—N/a	Operational	
Angosat 1	2009	2017-12-26	Zenit-3F/Fregat-SB	Baikonur Site 45/1	GEO	Success	1,550 kg (3,420 lb)	Commissioning	The ground controllers lose contact with the satellite shortly after launch, but later regained after the satellite was properly aligned with sun and confirmed that its onboard systems are in good health.
Tundra L13	2007	2018	Soyuz-2.1b/Fregat-M	Plesetsk Site 43/4	HEO	2018	—N/a	Planned	
Energia-100		2018	Soyuz-2.1b/Fregat-M	Vostochny Site 1S	GEO	2018	—N/a	Planned	
Tundra L14	2007	2019	Soyuz-2.1b/Fregat-M	Plesetsk Site 43/4	HEO	2019	—N/a	Planned	
Tundra L15	2007	2020	Soyuz-2.1b/Fregat-M	Plesetsk Site 43/4	HEO	2020	—N/a	Planned	
Yamal 203	2001	Cancelled	Proton-K/Blok-DM-2M	Baikonur	GEO	Cancelled	1,360 kg (3,000 lb)	Cancelled	
Yamal 204	2001	Cancelled	Proton-K/Blok-DM-2M	Baikonur	GEO	Cancelled	1,320 kg (2,910 lb)	Cancelled	
Yamal 301	2003	Cancelled	Proton-M/Blok DM-03	Baikonur	GEO	Cancelled	1,330 kg (2,930 lb)	Cancelled	
Yamal 302	2003	Cancelled	Proton-M/Blok DM-03	Baikonur	GEO	Cancelled	1,330 kg (2,930 lb)	Cancelled	

== See also ==
- RSC Energia – The USP bus designer and manufacturer.
- Gazprom Space Systems – Satellite communication division of the Russian oil giant Gazprom.
- Yamal – Communication satellite family operated by Gazprom Space Systems.
- EKS early warning system – A Russian early warning satellite system designed by RSC Energia that is based on the USP bus.
