= Yamal-102 =

Russian communications satellite

- Names: Ямал-102; Yamal-101 (after launch); Yamal-100 KA-1
- Mission type: Communications
- Operator: Gazprom Space Systems
- COSPAR ID: 1999-047B
- SATCAT no.: 25897
- Website: https://www.gazprom-spacesystems.ru
- Mission duration: 12 years (planned); 11 years, 2 months (achieved)

Spacecraft properties
- Spacecraft: Yamal-102
- Spacecraft type: Yamal-100
- Bus: USP Bus
- Manufacturer: RSC Energia (bus); Space Systems/Loral (payload)
- Launch mass: 1,360 kg (3,000 lb)
- Power: 2200 watts

Start of mission
- Launch date: 6 September 2009, 16:36:00 UTC
- Rocket: Proton-K / Blok DM-2M
- Launch site: Baikonur, Site 81/23
- Contractor: Khrunichev State Research and Production Space Center
- Entered service: November 1999

End of mission
- Disposal: Graveyard orbit
- Deactivated: 9 August 2010

Orbital parameters
- Reference system: Geocentric orbit
- Regime: Geostationary orbit
- Longitude: 90° East

Transponders
- Band: 12 C-band
- Coverage area: Russia

Yamal-102 (Russian: Ямал-102) was a geostationary communications satellite operated by Gazkom and built by RSC Energia. It was, along with Yamal-101 the first communications satellite of the Yamal programme and the first iteration of the USP Bus. It was a 1,360 kg (3,000 lb) satellite with 2200 watts of power (1300 watts available for the payload) on an unpressurized bus. It had eight SPT-70 electric thrusters by OKB Fakel for station keeping. Its payload was 12 C-band equivalent transponders supplied by Space Systems/Loral.

== History ==
It was launched along Yamal-101 on 6 September 1999 at 16:36:00 UTC from Baikonur Site 81/23 by a Proton-K / Blok DM-2M directly to geostationary orbit. While its twin Yamal-101 failed, Yamal-102 successfully deployed and was commissioned into service. On 9 August 2010, it was decommissioned and sent to a graveyard orbit. The satellite lasted 11 years and 2 months, a bit short of the design life of 12 years.

== Rename to Yamal-101 ==
Right after solar panel deployment Yamal-101 failed irreparably. Thus, Gazprom Space Systems registered Yamal-102 as Yamal-101. This has caused significant confusion but the records are clear that the satellite that failed was, in fact, the original Yamal-101.

== See also ==
- Yamal 101 – Twin satellite that was launched together and failed at separation
- Yamal – Communication satellite family operated by Gazprom Space Systems
- Gazprom Space Systems – Satellite communication division of the Russian oil giant Gazprom
- USP Bus – The satellite bus on which Yamal-101 is based
- RSC Energia – The designer and manufacturer of the Yamal-101 satellite
