= Yamal 101 =

Russian communications satellite

Yamal-101
- Names: Ямал-101; Yamal-100 KA-1
- Mission type: Communications
- Operator: Gazprom Space Systems
- COSPAR ID: 1999-047A
- SATCAT no.: 25896
- Website: https://www.gazprom-spacesystems.ru
- Mission duration: 12 years (planned); Failed on orbit

Spacecraft properties
- Spacecraft: Yamal-101
- Spacecraft type: Yamal-100
- Bus: USP Bus
- Manufacturer: RSC Energia (bus); Space Systems/Loral (payload)
- Launch mass: 1,360 kg (3,000 lb)
- Power: 2200 watts

Start of mission
- Launch date: 6 September 1999, 16:36:00 UTC
- Rocket: Proton-K / Blok DM-2M
- Launch site: Baikonur, Site 81/23
- Contractor: Khrunichev State Research and Production Space Center
- Entered service: Failed on orbit

End of mission
- Last contact: 6 September 1999

Orbital parameters
- Reference system: Geocentric orbit
- Regime: Geostationary orbit
- Longitude: 49° East (planned)

Transponders
- Band: 12 C-band
- Coverage area: Russia

Yamal-101 (Russian: Ямал-101) was an intended geostationary communications satellite that was lost after launch. It was built by RSC Energia and operated by Gazprom Space Systems. It was, along with Yamal-102 the first communications satellite of the Yamal programme and the first iteration of the USP Bus. It was a 1,360 kg (3,000 lb) satellite with 2200 watts of power (1300 watts available for the payload) on an unpressurized bus. It had eight SPT-70 electric thrusters by OKB Fakel for station keeping. Its payload was 12 C-band equivalent transponders supplied by Space Systems/Loral.

== History ==
It was launched successfully with Yamal-102, on 6 September 1999 at 16:36:00 UTC from Baikonur Site 81/23 by a Proton-K / Blok DM-2M directly to geostationary orbit. Due to a failure in the electrical system at solar panel deployment it was lost right after launch.

== Rename of Yamal-102 ==
After Yamal-101 failed, Gazprom Space Systems registered Yamal-102 as Yamal-101. This caused significant confusion, but the records are clear that the satellite that failed was the original Yamal-101. Insurance paid US$50 million for the failure.

== See also ==
- Yamal-102 – Twin satellite that was launched together and ended up commissioned into service with the Yamal-101 registration
- Yamal – Communication satellite family operated by Gazprom Space Systems
- Gazprom Space Systems – Satellite communication division of the Russian oil giant Gazprom
- USP Bus – The satellite bus on which Yamal-101 is based
- RSC Energia – The designer and manufacturer of the Yamal-101 satellite
