= OKB Fakel =

Subsidiary of Roscosmos

EDB Fakel
- Founded: 1955; 71 years ago
- Headquarters: Kaliningrad, Kaliningrad Oblast, Russia
- Owner: ROSCOSMOS State Corporation
- Number of employees: 960
- Parent: Roscosmos

EDB Fakel (Russian ОКБ "Факел") is a Russian electric propulsion system development company. It is located in Kaliningrad in Kaliningrad Oblast. It was founded in 1955 as a Propulsion laboratory of the Soviet Academy of Sciences; in 1962 it obtained status of Design Bureau, OKB.

== Overview ==
Fakel specializes in spacecraft attitude control thrusters, ion engines and plasma sources. It is a world leader in the field of Hall thruster development and a leading Russian developer and manufacturer of electric propulsion systems. The company's third-generation electric propulsion system SPT-100 has been certified in accordance with western standards and the company is actively marketing the system to foreign customers.

The company has 960 employees.

== Flight missions ==
Many companies have used Fakel electrically powered spacecraft propulsion systems on their hardware flown in space. Company's hardware were used on SESAT 1, Alphasat, LS-1300, Meteor spacecraft, USP bus, AMOS-6, MobaHo!, Inmarsat-4 F3, Astra 1K, Luch, and many others as well.

== Partners ==
Due to the large experience gained by the company in electric engines, notable companies have entered into partnership with the company.

ISS-Reshetnev - Khrunichev - TsSKB-Progress - NPO Lavochkin - RKK Energiya - Keldysh Research Center - CNIIHM - Moscow Aviation Institute - Aerojet Rocketdyne - Snecma - Thales Alenia Space - Airbus Defence and Space - Space Systems/Loral - RUAG - Israel Aerospace Industries - OHB Sweden - Aerospazio.
