= Gazprom Space Systems =

Russian satellite operator

- Company type: Open joint-stock company
- Founded: 2 November 1992
- Headquarters: Shchyolkovo, Russia
- Key people: Dmitry Sevastiyanov
- Parent: Gazprom, RSC Energia, Gazprombank
- Website: gazprom-spacesystems.ru

OJSC Gazprom Space Systems (Russian: ОАО «Газпром космические системы»), previously known as (Gazcom) (Russian: «Газком»), is a Russian communications satellite operator and developer.

== Overview ==
Gascom currently operates the Yamal telecommunication satellites, initially designed and built jointly with the Energia space corporation. The satellites are used to transmit over 60 Russian and foreign television channels, and are also used by the Defense, Nuclear Energy, and Education Ministries. The gas company Gazprom accounts for 17% of the use of Gascom's services. Government structures use 10%, corporate and commercial service providers 51%, and commercial television companies 22%.

Gascom experienced high growth rates in the early 21st century, with annual revenues growing from $5.5 million in 2000 to £32.6 million in 2005 and $83.7 million in 2008.

== History ==
The company was founded in 1992 by several Gazprom Group enterprises (Yamburggazdobicha, Tumenburgaz, Urengoygazprom, Nadimgazprom, Tumentransgaz), as well as NPO Energia and Gazprombank.

== See also ==
- United Rocket and Space Corporation
