= Khrunichev State Research and Production Space Center =

Russian aerospace manufacturer

Coordinates: 55.755°N 37.492°E

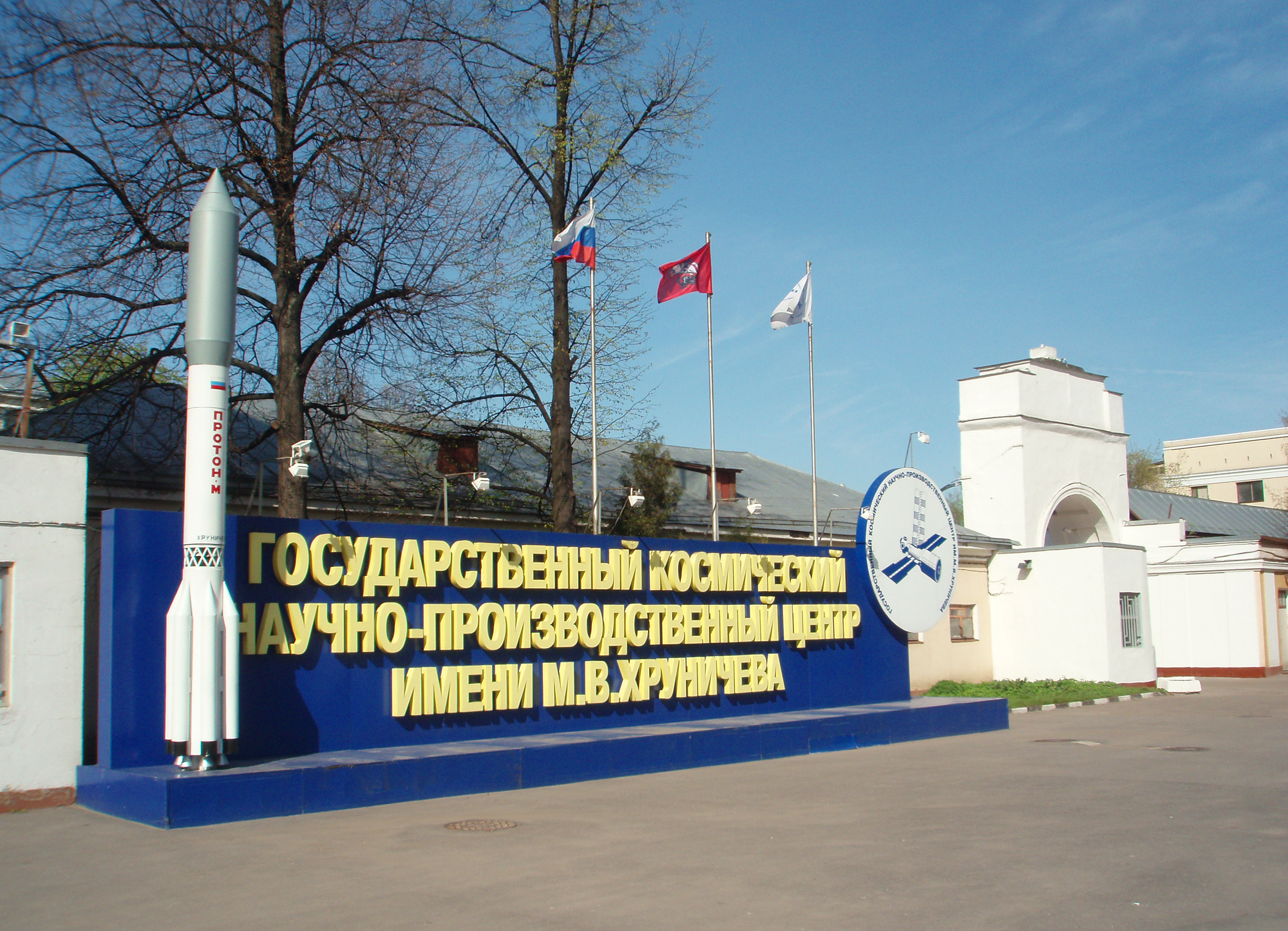
- Company type: Federal state unitary enterprise
- Industry: Aerospace
- Founded: 1916
- Headquarters: Moscow, Russia
- Products: Rockets, Ballistic missiles, Launch vehicles, Spacecraft
- Revenue: $586 million (2017)
- Operating income: −$432 million (2017)
- Net income: −$397 million (2017)
- Total assets: $2.61 billion (2017)
- Total equity: $147 million (2017)
- Parent: Roscosmos
- Website: www.khrunichev.ru

The Khrunichev State Research and Production Space Center (Государственный космический научно-производственный центр (ГКНПЦ) имени М. В. Хру́ничева in Russian) is a Moscow-based manufacturer of spacecraft and space-launch systems, including the Proton and Rokot rockets, and the Russian modules of Mir and the International Space Station.

The company's history dates back to 1916, when an automobile factory was established at Fili, western suburb of Moscow. It soon switched production to airplanes and during World War II produced Ilyushin Il-4 and Tupolev Tu-2 bombers. A design bureau, OKB-23, was added to the company in 1951. In 1959, the company started developing intercontinental ballistic missiles, and later spacecraft and space launch vehicles. The company designed and produced all Soviet space stations, including Mir.

OKB-23, renamed to Salyut Design Bureau, became an independent company in 1988. In 1993, the Khrunichev Plant and the Salyut Design Bureau were joined again to form Khrunichev State Research and Production Space Center. In the 1990s, the company entered the International Launch Services joint-venture to market launches on its Proton rocket. Khrunichev subsequently became a successful launch service provider on the international space launch market.

The company had around 2010 an over 30% market share of the global space launch market, and its revenue from commercial space launches in 2009 was $584 million. It is named after Mikhail Khrunichev, a Soviet minister.

Current number of employees is about 43,500.

== History ==
=== Beginnings ===
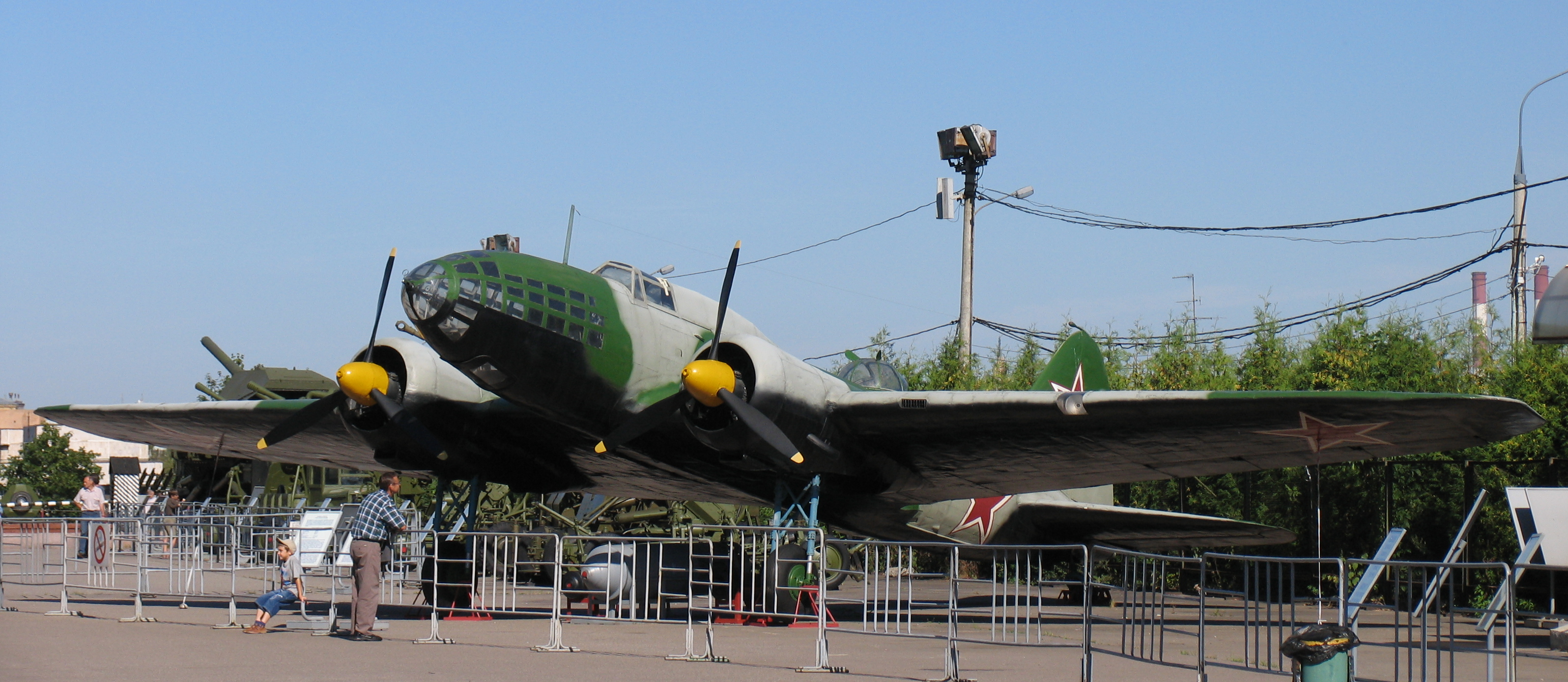
Ilyushin-4 bomber

Khrunichev's history dates back to April 1916, when an automobile factory called Second "Russo-Balt" automobile plant was established at Fili, western suburb of Moscow. The first cars of the Russo-Balt brand were produced there in 1922. The next year, the factory switched to producing Ju-20 and Ju-21 aircraft for the German company Junkers. It was renamed State Aircraft Plant No. 7. The development of a Russian aircraft industry started soon after. In 1926, this became Zavod 22, where the aircraft of Andrey Tupolev were developed. During World War II, the plant produced Russian-designed Ilyushin Il-4 and Tu-2 long-range bombers. This factory later became the Khrunichev Machine Building Plant.

=== Soviet era ===
In 1951 the Experimental Design Bureau No. 23 (OKB-23) headed by V. Myasishchev was created and added to Khrunichev. In the 1950s, it designed the Myasishchev M-4, Myasishchev M-50 and Myasishchev M-52 planes, among others. The Khrunichev plant was responsible for manufacturing OKB-23 designs.

In 1959, the company's focus switched from aircraft to rocket technology, in accordance with a government decision. In the 1960s, Khrunichev and OKB-23 were subordinated to Vladimir Chelomey's OKB-52 (later renamed to TsKBM, today NPO Mashinostroyeniya).

Under the OKB-52 leadership, OKB-23 started to design intercontinental ballistic missiles. Its first designs were the UR-200, which never flew, followed by the successful UR-100 family of missiles. In 1962, the design process of the UR-500 super-heavy ICBM was started. This later evolved into the Proton space launch vehicle in 1964. The first Proton rocket was launched on 16 July 1965.

In 1966 OKB-52 was renamed the Central Design Bureau of Machine-Building (TsKBM), and OKB-23 became known as the Fili Branch of TsKBM. It was split off from TsKBM in the late 1970s, and renamed the Salyut Design Bureau, or KB Salyut for short. In 1981–1988, KB Salyut was part of the large NPO Energiya company, and become an independent design bureau in 1988. The partnership with Khrunichev Machine-Building plant continued through all this time.

KB Salyut and Khrunichev were responsible for designing and producing all Soviet space stations, including Salyut, Almaz and Mir, as well as every heavy-weight module used for these stations.

=== Post-1991 adjustments ===
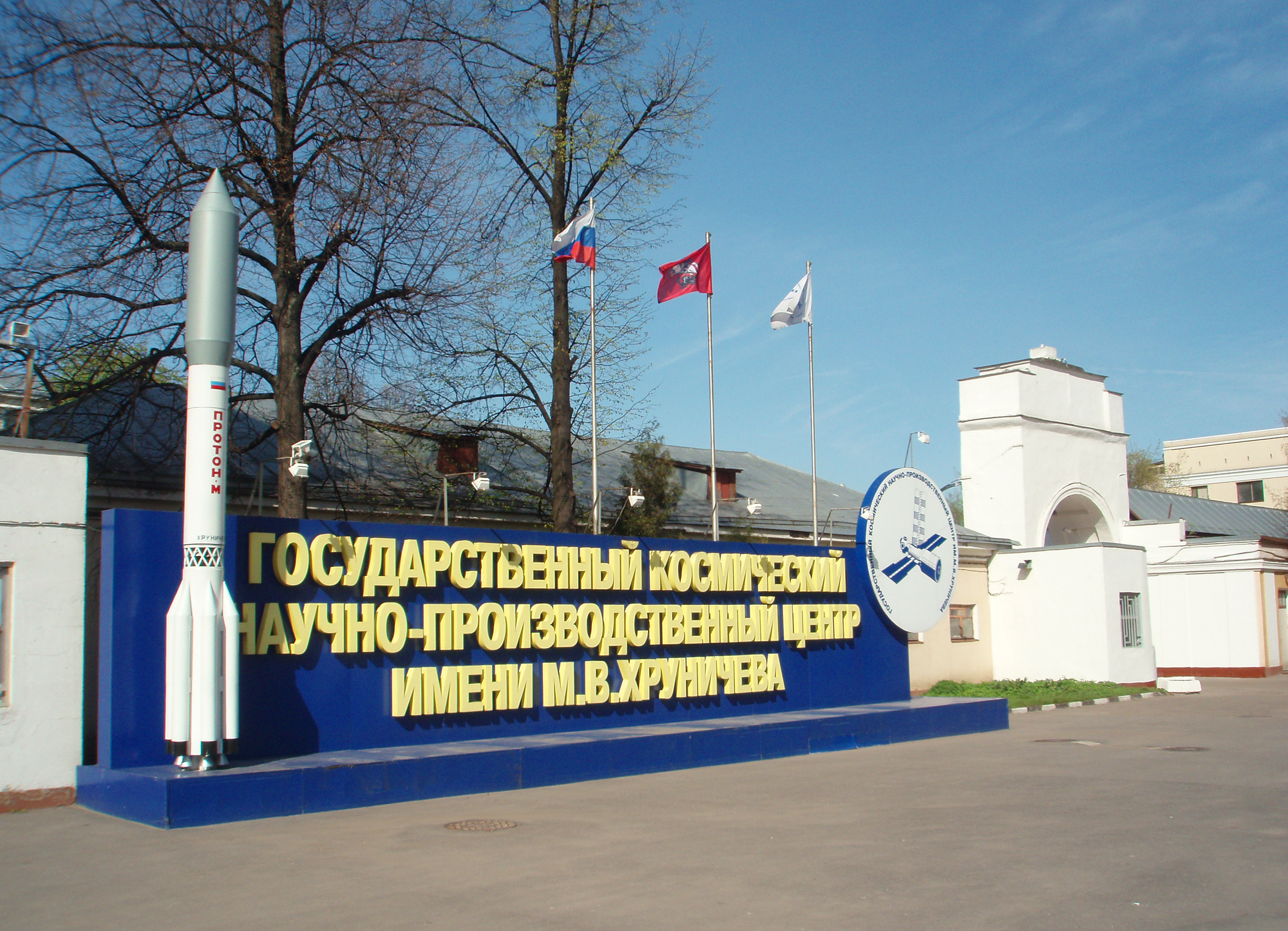
Entrance to Khrunichev State Research and Production Space Center in Moscow

The dissolution of the Soviet Union resulted in great difficulties for the Russian space industry. Over the years 1989–1999, the country's space budget dropped by 88% and established production cooperation chains disintegrated. Both Khrunichev and the Salyut Design Bureau, which were now separate companies, attempted to remedy the situation by seeking earning possibilities abroad. Salyut managed to win a contract for producing the 12KRB booster for the Indian GSLV rocket and entered an agreement with Daimler Benz Aerospace to develop a recoverable capsule used for experiments in the German-Japanese Express project.

At this time, the Proton launch vehicle proved as the most profitable product for both companies. The Khrunichev plant signed a $156 million contract to launch 21 Iridium satellites on three Proton-K rockets in 1997–1998. Salyut managed to sign only one contract for launching the Inmarsat-3 F satellite with Proton-K at the low price of $36 million. Both companies attempted to enter partnerships with foreign companies to market Proton launches.

The situation where two companies, the design bureau and the factory, competed with each other to sell the same product proved problematic. To solve this, on 7 June 1993, President of Russia Boris Yeltsin issued a decree to merge Khrunichev and Salyut, forming the company Khrunichev State Research and Production Space Center. The new company's status was unique in that it was not subordinate to any ministries or to the Russian Space Agency. Vladimir Kirillov, writing for the Eksport Vooruzheniy journal, speculates that this was because Yeltsin's daughter Tatyana Dyachenko, who had worked at Salyut and continued to work for Khrunichev until 1994, wished to secure a high status for her employer.

=== Success on the international launch market ===
On 15 April 1993 Khrunichev had created the Lockheed-Khrunichev-Energia joint venture with the American company Lockheed, and in 1995, due to the merger of Lockheed and Martin Marietta, it was transformed into International Launch Services (ILS). The joint venture marketed launches on both the Proton and the American Atlas rockets. The United States had given permission for the appearance of Proton on the international launch market, but introduced a quota to protect the launch market from "Russian dumping." Despite this, the Proton, built by Khrunichev, was successful and by the end of 2000 had earned launch contracts worth over $1.5 billion.

The income from commercial launch contracts and investments from Lockheed enabled Khrunichev to conduct a serious upgrade of its facilities. This included an upgrade of the company's launch facilities in Baikonur, for which several hundred million dollars were invested. The commercial earnings also allowed the company to develop new launch vehicles, boosters and spacecraft on its own without government support. Since its creation, International Launch Services has signed contracts for more than 100 launches valued at more than $8 billion.

In 1998, Khrunichev was made subordinate to the Russian Space Agency, then called Rosaviakosmos. Khrunichev resisted the move for a long time, and managed to prevent the agency from installing its own leadership in the company.

One disadvantage for Khrunichev was that the Blok DM upper stage, used by Proton, was manufactured by the company RSC Energia, and Khrunichev had to pay 40% of its launch revenue for its usage. Due to this, in 1996–1998, Khrunichev started the development of its own upper stage, called the Briz-KM. Partly because of funding difficulties, the development process was slow and Briz-KM experienced several failures in its early days. After a Briz-M failure prevented the AMC-14 satellite from reaching its designated orbit, several modifications were made in this upper stage.

=== Integration programme ===
In the 2000s, Khrunichev entered a vertical integration programme to bring its principal suppliers under a single management. For this purpose, Khrunichev absorbed the following companies:

- PO Polyot, a rocket manufacturer located in Omsk
- Proton-PM, an engine maker located in Perm
- Voronezh Mechanical Plant, which manufactures engines for Proton Stages II and III, Soyuz Stage III and Zenit upper stage
- KBKhM, manufacturer of propulsion systems for the Breeze upper stage located in Korolyov
- KBKhA, a contractor for production and design issues located in Voronezh

As of 2010, the integration had resulted in the share of in-house production for Proton and the Breeze upper stage rising from 30% to 65% of the product value.

== Structure ==
Companies of the Khrunichev Space Center:

- Salyut Design Bureau
- Space Rocket Plant
- Space Hardware Operation Plant (ZERKT)
- Armatura Design Bureau
- Khrunichev Telecom
- Space Systems Research and Development Institute
- Medical Equipment and Consumer Goods Division
- Voronezh Mechanical Plant
- Polyot Production Corporation
- Isayev Chemical Engineering Design Bureau
- Ust-Katav Carriage Plant Named for S.M. Kirov (UKVZ)

== Production ==
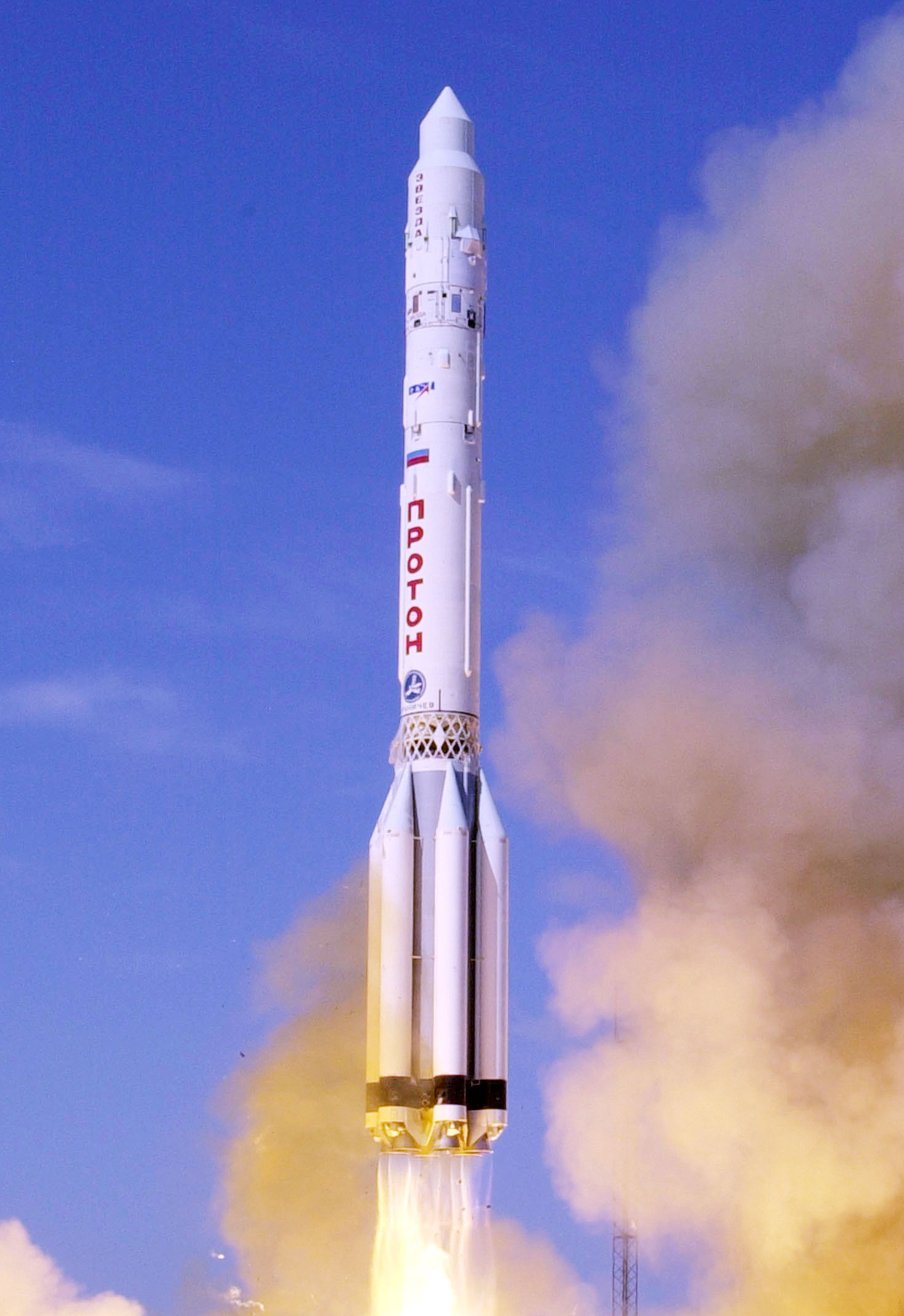
Proton rocket manufactured by Khrunichev

Khrunichev's main product is the Proton rocket, which has been launched more than 350 times since its creation in 1968. Latest version of the venerable rocket, which has been subject to several incremental upgrades, is Proton-M Enhanced; it has a lifting capability of 6,150 kg to geostationary transfer orbit. For use as Proton's upper stage, Khrunichev produces Briz-M, which first flew in 2000. Rockot, a converted ballistic missile, is offered for launching smaller payloads. For international marketing of Rockot launches, Khrunichev has created the joint-venture Eurockot GmbH. Another version of the Briz-M upper stage, Briz-KM, is used as Rockot's third stage.

In 2009, the company manufactured a total of 25 launch vehicles, upper stage boosters and spacecraft, while in 2005 the figure was 11. In 2010, Khrunichev aims to raise the figure to 30.

A record 15 rockets were launched by the company in 2009. In 2008, the company was responsible for lofting every third kilogram of the world's combined satellite payload.

=== Revenue ===
Khrunichev's revenue from commercial launches (not including launches for the Ministry of Defense) in 2009 was $584 million—growing considerably from the $198 million figure in 2004. Since 1994, Proton has earned $4.3 billion for the Russian space industry as a whole, and in 2011 this figure is expected to raise to $6 billion.

In 2006–2009, investments in modernization and retooling amounted to RUB 2.6 billion.

=== Angara rocket family ===
Since 1995, Khrunichev has been developing the Angara rocket family. The main purpose of Angara is to ensure Russia's independent access to space, as the rockets can be launched from the Plesetsk Cosmodrome in northern Russia as well as the Vostochny Cosmodrome, instead of having to rely on Baikonur Cosmodrome, which is located on the territory of Kazakhstan. Angara also does not use the toxic fuel that is used by Proton. The Angara programme has been hit by several delays. State funding started to reach appropriate levels only in 2005. In 2009, it was estimated that Angara had 95–97% completion rate over all major program indicators. The main stumbling block is the construction of the new launch pad in Plesetsk. Due to unrealistic deflator indices set by the Ministry of Defense, Khrunichev has not received enough money to order all necessary equipment for finishing the pad, pushing Angara's expected first flight to 2013. When completed, the Angara rockets are intended to replace several existing launchers, including Proton.

== List of rockets and missiles ==
- Angara
- Briz-M
- Universal Rocket
  - UR-100
  - UR-100N
    - Rokot
    - Strela
  - UR-200
  - UR-500 – Proton rocket family
    - Proton-K
    - Proton-M

== See also ==
- TKS-based spacecraft
- United Rocket and Space Corporation
- National Space Centre (Moscow)
