= Kondor (satellite) =

Series of Russian satellites

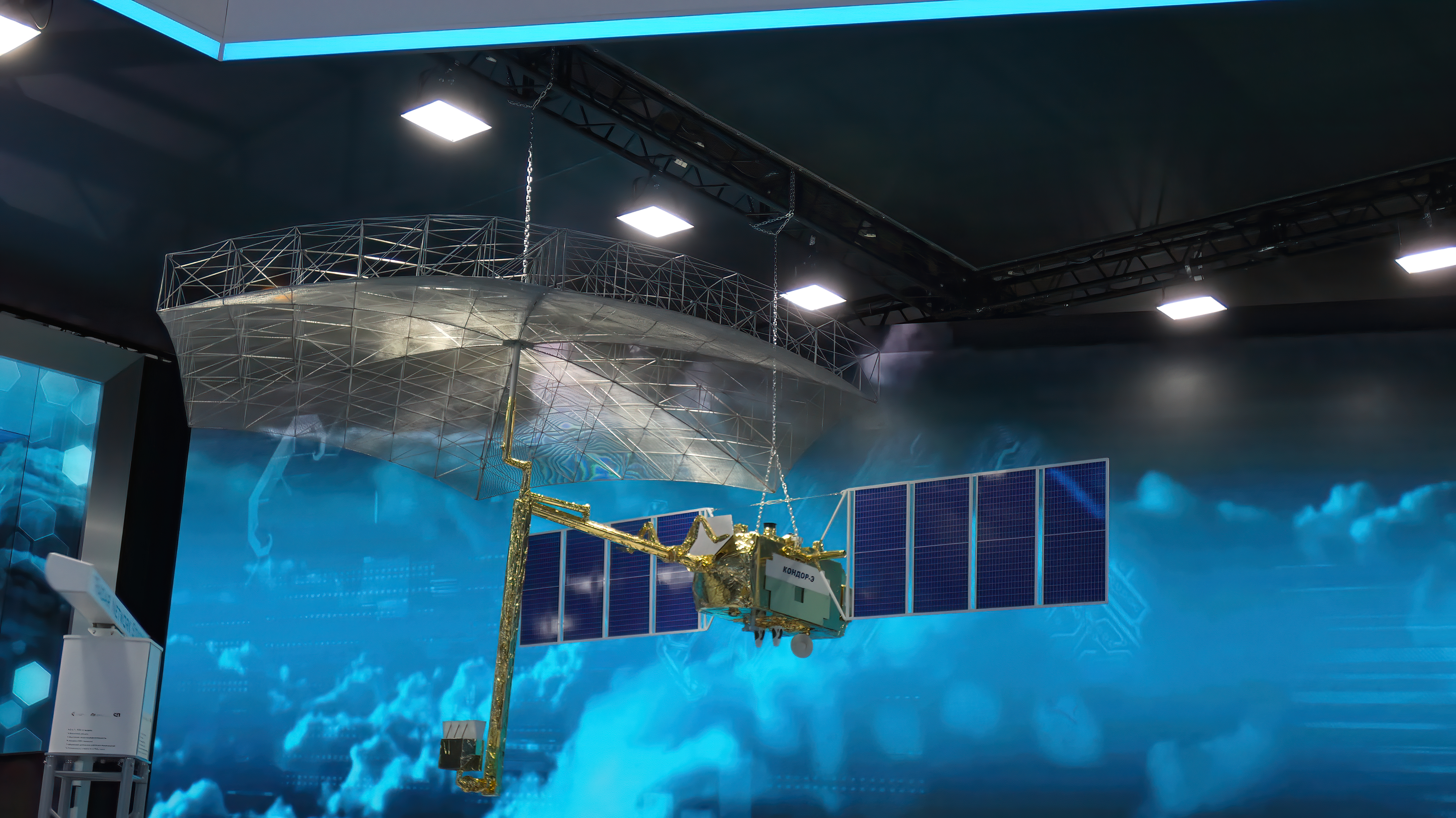
- Kondor-E (Export)
- Manufacturer: NPO Mashinostroyeniya
- Country of origin: Russia
- Applications: Optical imaging Radar imaging

Specifications
- Launch mass: 1,000 kilograms (2,200 lb)
- Regime: Low Earth
- Design life: 3-5 years

Production
- Status: In production
- On order: 3
- Built: 4
- Launched: 4
- Operational: 3
- Maiden launch: Kosmos 2487 (Kondor No.202); 27 June 2013
- Last launch: Kondor-FKA No.2; 29 November 2024

Kondor, GRAU index 14F133, is a series of Earth imaging or military reconnaissance satellites developed by NPO Mashinostroyeniya for the Russian Aerospace Defence Forces which in 2015 became the Russian Space Forces and export customers. Satellites for the Russian military are designated "Kondor", whilst those for export are designated Kondor-E.

Kondor satellites are equipped to carry either synthetic aperture radar or electro-optical imaging payloads, with the first satellite, and are launched using the Strela carrier rocket, developed by NPO Mashinostroyeniya from retired UR-100NUTTKh missiles.

A mass simulator named Gruzomaket (aka Kondor-E-GVM, COSPAR 2003-055A) was launched on 5 December 2003, and almost ten years later, on 27 June 2013, the first spacecraft was launched. Kondor No.202 (aka Kosmos 2487, Kondor 1, COSPAR 2013-032A) was operated by the Russian military, and carried a radar imaging payload. It was the first radar imaging satellite to be operated by the Russian military after the Soviet RORSAT and Almaz-T series. The first Kondor-E (Kondor-E 1, COSPAR 2014-084A) launched 19 December 2014 for South Africa.

Civilian versions of the satellite have been designed under the name Kondor-FKA or Kondor-FKA-M. The launch of the first Kondor-FKA satellite took place on 26 May 2023, while the launch of the second took place on 29 November 2024, both from the Vostochny Cosmodrome.
