= SL-19 =

SL-19 may refer to:

- Strela, a Russian launch vehicle used from 2003-present
- Rokot, a Russian launch vehicle used from 1990-present
