= RD-0216 =

Liquid rocket engines

RD-0216 (РД-0216)
- Country of origin: Soviet Union
- First flight: 1965-04-19
- Designer: OKB-154
- Manufacturer: PO Motorostroitel or Perm
- Application: ICBM propulsion
- Associated LV: UR-100
- Successor: RD-0235
- Status: Retired

Liquid-fuel engine
- Propellant: N_{2}O_{4} / UDMH
- Cycle: Oxidizer Rich Staged combustion

Configuration
- Chamber: 1

Performance
- Thrust: 219 kilonewtons (49,000 lbf)
- Chamber pressure: 14.7 megapascals (2,130 psi)
- Specific impulse: 313 s (3.07 km/s)

Used in
- UR-100 Core Stage

RD-0235 (РД-0235)
- Country of origin: USSR
- First flight: 1973-04-09
- Designer: OKB-154
- Manufacturer: Krasny Oktyabr factory
- Application: ICBM propulsion
- Associated LV: UR-100N, Rokot and Strela
- Status: Out of Production

Liquid-fuel engine
- Propellant: N_{2}O_{4} / UDMH
- Cycle: Oxidizer Rich Staged combustion

Configuration
- Chamber: 1

Performance
- Thrust: 240 kilonewtons (54,000 lbf)
- Chamber pressure: 17.5 megapascals (2,540 psi)
- Specific impulse: 320 s (3.1 km/s)

Used in
- UR-100N Second Stage

The RD-0216 (Russian: Ракетный Двигатель-0216, romanized: Raketnyy Dvigatel-0216, lit. 'Rocket Engine 0216') and RD-0217 are liquid rocket engines, burning N_{2}O_{4} and UDMH in the oxidizer rich staged combustion cycle. The only difference between the RD-0216 and the RD-0217 is that the latter doesn't have a heat exchanger to heat the pressuring gasses for the tanks. Three RD-0216 and one RD-0217 were used on the first stage of the UR-100 ICBM. The engines were manufactured until 1974 and stayed in operational use until 1991. More than 1100 engines were produced.

For the UR-100N project, while first stage propulsion was based on the more powerful RD-0233 engine. The second stage used a variation of the RD-0217 called the RD-0235 (GRAU Index 15D113). It used a vacuum optimized nozzle extension, and thus had an extra 10 seconds of isp and 21 kilonewtons (4,700 lbf) of more thrust. It has a fixed nozzle and relies on the RD-0236 vernier engine for thrust vectoring. While the engine has been out of production for a while, the UR-100NU and the Rokot and Strela use it as of 2015.

== See also ==
- UR-100
- UR-100N
- Rokot
- Strela
- Rocket engine using liquid fuel
