= SERVIS-2 =

Japanese technological research satellite

- Mission type: Technology
- Operator: USEF
- COSPAR ID: 2010-023A
- SATCAT no.: 36588
- Website: USEF - Project SERVIS
- Mission duration: 1 year

Spacecraft properties
- Manufacturer: Mitsubishi Electric
- Launch mass: 740 kilograms (1,630 lb)
- Dimensions: 2.5 by 10.2 metres (8.2 by 33.5 ft)
- Power: 1,300 W

Start of mission
- Launch date: 2 June 2010, 01:59 UTC
- Rocket: Rokot/Briz-KM
- Launch site: Plesetsk 133/3
- Contractor: Eurockot

Orbital parameters
- Reference system: Geocentric
- Regime: Sun-synchronous
- Inclination: 100.4 degrees

SERVIS-2, or Space Environment Reliability Verification Integrated System 2, is a Japanese technological research satellite which was launched in 2010. It was constructed by Mitsubishi Electric, and will be operated by the Institute for Unmanned Space Experiment Free Flyer, USEF. It follows on from the SERVIS-1 spacecraft, which was launched in 2003.

== Launch ==
The launch of SERVIS-2 was conducted by Eurockot, using a Rokot carrier rocket with a Briz-KM upper stage. The launch occurred from Site 133/3 at the Plesetsk Cosmodrome in Russia. Eurockot, who were also responsible for launching the SERVIS-1 spacecraft, were awarded the contract to launch SERVIS-2 on 21 February 2007.

SERVIS-2 arrived at the Plesetsk Cosmodrome on 26 April 2010. Prior to launch, the spacecraft underwent final testing and fuelling, and was subsequently attached to its launch adaptor on 22 May. This was attached to the upper stage the next day, and the day after that the spacecraft was encapsulated in the payload fairing. Under terminology used by Eurockot, as well as several other launch service providers, the combination of spacecraft, adaptor, upper stage and fairing was designated the Upper Composite. This was transported to the launch pad on 27 May for integration with the first two stages of the rocket. The launch occurred successfully at 01:59 UTC on 2 June 2010.

== Spacecraft ==
SERVIS-2 is a 740-kilogram (1,630 lb) spacecraft, which measures 2.5 by 10.2 metres (8.2 by 33.5 ft). It is intended to conduct experiments related to the demonstration of technology to be used in future missions, particularly research into the use of commercial off-the-shelf equipment. The spacecraft has a design life of one year, and its Solar panels will provide it with at least 1,300 watts of power.

SERVIS-2 operates in a Sun-synchronous low Earth orbit, at an altitude of 1,200 kilometres (750 mi) and an inclination of 100.4 degrees.

=== Experiments ===
Nine experiments are being conducted by SERVIS-2. They are mostly described (in Japanese) in a special edition of Uchu Kagaku Gijutsu Rengo Koenkai Koenshu (Proceedings of the Space Sciences and Technology Conference).

Name	Full name	Description	Remarks
LIBA	Lithium-Ion (Mn type) Battery system with Automotive Technology		
ADMS	High Assurance Data Management System		
CRAFT	Fault-Tolerant Computer with CRAFT System		
PPRTU	Plug-and-Play Remote Terminal Unit		
HPDC	High Performance Data Compressor		
APE	Advanced Positioning Experimental Module		
ASM	Advanced Satellite Structure Experimental Module		
MBW	Magnetic Bearing Wheel		
MEMS	RF-MEMS Experiment Unit		

The Commercial Parts Test Unit on SERVIS-2 is carrying 4Mbit and 8Mbit SRAM chips, 256Mbit and 512Mbit DRAM chips, 128kbit SOI SRAM chips made on a 180 nm process, and NOR-type 128Mbit flash memory chips.

== See also ==
- 2010 in spaceflight
