= Kosmos 2483 =

- Mission type: Communications
- Operator: Russian Aerospace Defence Forces
- COSPAR ID: 2013-001B
- SATCAT no.: 39058

Spacecraft properties
- Spacecraft type: Strela-3M
- Manufacturer: Reshetnev ISS

Start of mission
- Launch date: January 15, 2013, 16:24 UTC
- Rocket: Rokot/Briz-KM
- Launch site: Plesetsk 133/3

Orbital parameters
- Reference system: Geocentric
- Regime: Low Earth

Kosmos 2483 (Russian: Космос 2483 meaning Cosmos 2483) is a Russian military store-dump communications satellite launched in 2013, together with Kosmos 2484 and Kosmos 2482.

This satellite is a Strela-3M/Rodnik satellite, a modification of the civilian Gonets satellites.

Kosmos 2483 was launched from site 133/3 at Plesetsk Cosmodrome in northern Russia. A rokot carrier rocket with a Briz-KM upper stage was used to perform the launch which took place at 16:24 UTC on 15 January 2013. The launch successfully placed the satellite into low Earth orbit. It subsequently received its Kosmos designation, and the international designator 2013-001B. The United States Space Command assigned it the Satellite Catalog Number 39058.

The launch was postponed from 8 December 2012 and was the first launch of a Rokot since the 28 July 2012 launch of Kosmos 2481, another Rodnik.

== See also ==
- List of Kosmos satellites (2251–2500)
