= 29th Arsenal (Russia) =

Russian Armed Forces weapons storage and maintenance depot

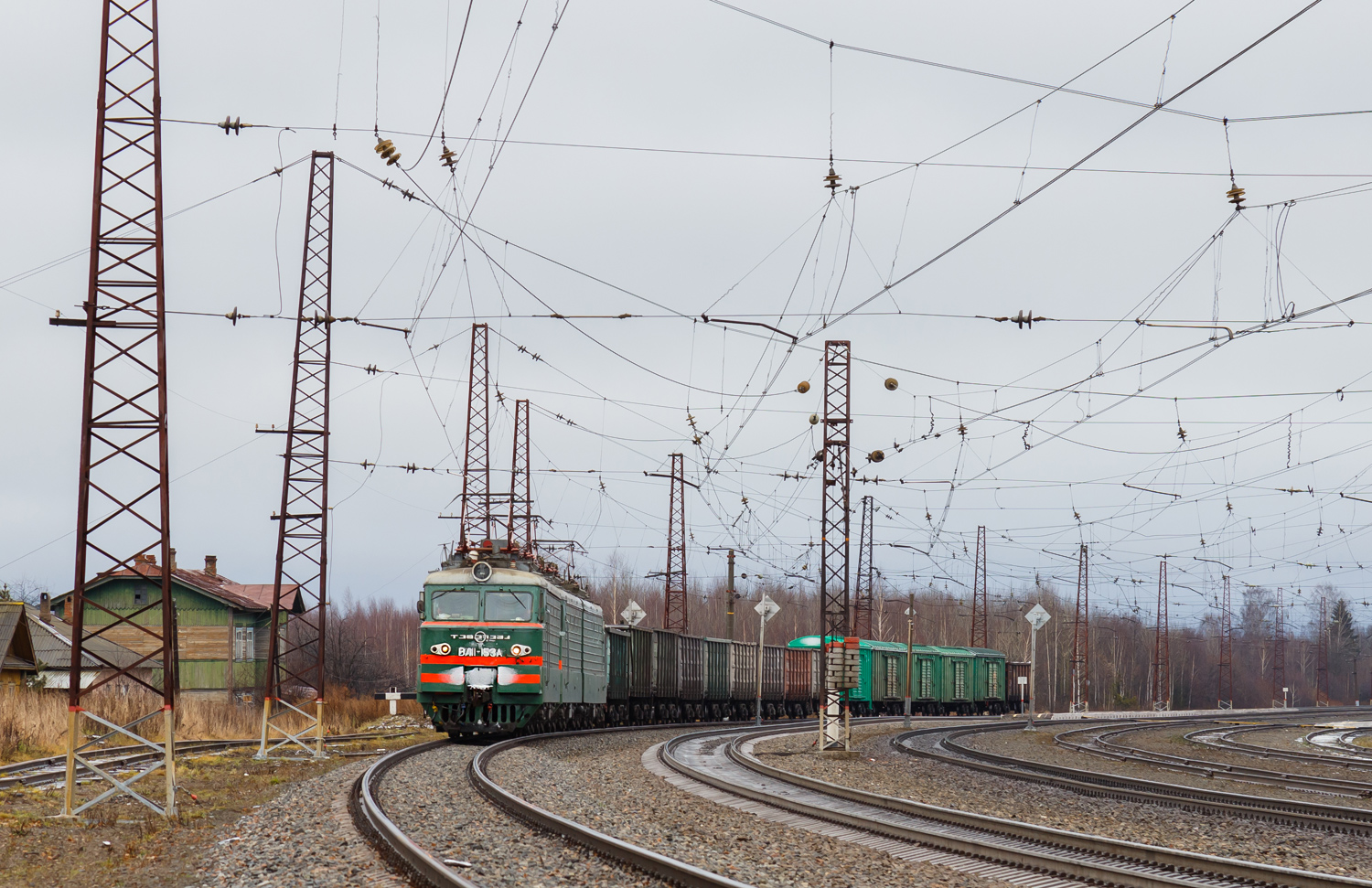
A train at Pibanshur station

The 29th Arsenal of the Strategic Rocket Forces is a military formation (arsenal, military unit). It was first part of the Strategic Rocket Forces (RSVN) of the Soviet Armed Forces and then became part of the RSVN of the Russian Federation. It is located in the settlement of Balezino-3, Balezinsky District, Udmurt Republic. Its Military Unit Number is No. 25850.

It is located at 57°51′22″N 53°16′44″E.

Overall, arsenals in the Armed Forces of the Russian Federation are involved in building, maintaining, issuing, and storing weaponry for their forces. During the Cold War the 29th Arsenal stored and maintained UR-100 (DOD: SS-11 "Sego"), SS-17, SS-18 "Satan", SS-19 and SS-25 intercontinental ballistic missiles.

== History ==
In 1953, not far from the Pibanshur station (ru:Пибаньшур, 1213 kilometers of the Trans-Siberian Railway), a plot of land was allocated for the construction of a military unit. A year later, construction of a workers' settlement began on the allocated plot of land, headed by Colonel Rakovsky. Two years later, the first stage of construction of not only the settlement, but also the unit was put into operation. In mid-1956, the first unit — a technical battery — was created. From this moment, the unit began to form, which was initially assigned the conditional number (V/Ch) 14000. Colonel Boris Nikolaevich Sharkov was appointed its first commander. By 1958, production units and rear services were created in the unit. On December 17, 1959, the Strategic Rocket Forces were created within the Soviet Armed Forces (Armed Forces of the USSR), after which the unit received a new code number - 25850 - and began to carry out tasks to support the new force. Soon, the Minister of Defense of the USSR approved the Day of the Unit - November 25, 1956.
