= USEF =

USEF may refer to:

- United States Equestrian Federation
- Institute for Unmanned Space Experiment Free Flyer of Japan
