= Kosmos 2467 =

Russian military communications satellite

- Mission type: Communications satellite
- Operator: VKS
- COSPAR ID: 2010-043B
- SATCAT no.: 37153

Spacecraft properties
- Manufacturer: NPO Prikladnoi Mekhaniki (NPO PM)
- Launch mass: 225 kilograms (496 lb)

Start of mission
- Launch date: 8 September 2010, 03:30 UTC
- Rocket: Rokot/Briz-KM
- Launch site: Plesetsk 133/3

Orbital parameters
- Reference system: Geocentric
- Regime: Low Earth Orbit
- Perigee altitude: 1,509 kilometres (938 mi)
- Apogee altitude: 1,498 kilometres (931 mi)
- Inclination: 82.4 degrees
- Period: 116.06 minutes
- Epoch: 9 September 2011

Kosmos 2467 (Russian: Космос 2467 meaning Cosmos 2467) is one of a pair of Russian military communications satellites which were launched in 2010 by the Russian Space Forces. It was launched with Kosmos 2468 and a Gonets-M civilian communication satellite.

== Launch ==
Kosmos 2467 was launched from Site 133/3 at Plesetsk Cosmodrome in northern Russia. It was launched by a Rockot carrier rocket with a Briz-KM upper stage at 03:30 UTC on 8 September 2010. The launch successfully placed the satellites into low Earth orbit. It subsequently received its Kosmos designations, and the international designators 2010-043B. The United States Space Command assigned it the Satellite Catalog Number 37153.

== Strela-3 and Rodnik ==
Kosmos 2467 and Kosmos 2468 are Strela-3 communications satellite. One of them is a Strela-3, and one is a Strela-3M. It is not known which is which. They are described as store-dump communications satellites which receive information from the ground when they pass overhead, and store that information until they pass over the ground station they deliver the information to. The satellites are in low Earth orbit going round the Earth every 116 minutes. A full deployment of Strela-3 craft should consist of twelve satellites. One satellite has the GRAU index of 17F13, as a Strela-3, and the other has a GRAU index of 17F132 as a Strela-3M.

Strela-3 has a civilian variant called Gonets which is used by the Russian government for communication in remote areas. It can take between two minutes and six hours to deliver messages.

The previous satellites of this class, Kosmos 2451, Kosmos 2452 and Kosmos 2453 were launched together in July 2009.

== See also ==
- List of Kosmos satellites (2251–2500)
