= SERVIS-1 =

Japanese technological research satellite

- Mission type: Technology
- Operator: USEF
- COSPAR ID: 2003-050A
- SATCAT no.: 28060
- Website: USEF - Project SERVIS
- Mission duration: 2 years

Spacecraft properties
- Manufacturer: Mitsubishi Electric
- Launch mass: 840 kilograms (1,850 lb)
- Dimensions: 2.5 by 10.2 metres (8.2 by 33.5 ft)
- Power: 1,300 watts

Start of mission
- Launch date: 30 October 2003, 13:43:42 UTC
- Rocket: Rokot/Briz-KM
- Launch site: Plesetsk 133/3
- Contractor: Eurockot

Orbital parameters
- Reference system: Geocentric
- Regime: Sun-synchronous
- Perigee altitude: 984 kilometres (611 mi)
- Apogee altitude: 1,015 kilometres (631 mi)
- Inclination: 99.5 degrees

SERVIS-1, or Space Environment Reliability Verification Integrated System 1, is a Japanese satellite designed for testing the performance of commercial off-the-shelf products in the space environment. It has a mass of about 840 kg, and was launched on 30 October 2003 from the Plesetsk Cosmodrome by Eurockot, who used a Rokot rocket with a Briz-KM upper stage. The satellite was active for two years. A second satellite, SERVIS-2, was launched in 2010.

== Experiments ==
Nine experiments were being conducted by SERVIS-1.

| Name | Full name | Description | Remarks |
|---|---|---|---|
| VTS | Vane-type Propellant Tank System | | |
| INU | Integrated Navigation Unit | | |
| PCDS | Power Control and Distribution Unit | | |
| APDM | Advanced Paddle Drive Mechanism | | |
| ATTC | Advanced Tracking Telemetry and Command Transponder | | |
| OBC | On Board Computer | | |
| SIS | Integrated Satellite Controller with Star Sensor | | |
| LIB | Lithium Ion Battery System | | |
| FOIRU | Fibre Optic Gyro Inertial Reference Unit | | |

== Results from the mission ==
All the modules on the satellite worked as planned. The mission tested a number of electronic components, and determined that the rate of single-event upsets at its 1000 km orbit was substantially less than had been expected from tests using heavy ion bombardment on the ground.

== See also ==
- 2003 in spaceflight
