= Geo-IK-2 =

Russian geodesy satellites

The Geo-IK-2 is a Russian series of new generation military geodesy satellites replacing the Soviet Union's Geo-IK and Sfera constellations. They are intended to be used to create high precision three-dimensional maps of the Earth's surface, and to monitor plate tectonics. The satellites are produced by ISS Reshetnev, and have a mass of around 1,400 kilograms (3,100 lb). They operate in a circular orbit at an altitude of around 1,000 kilometres (620 mi) above the Earth's surface.

Not to be confused with the Napryazhenie / 14F150 / Nivelir military geodesy satellites.

== Launches ==
Designation	Launch date (GMT)	Carrier rocket	Orbit	Remarks
Geo-IK-2 #11 / Musson 2 #1 (Kosmos 2470)	1 February 2011; 14:00	Rokot/Briz-KM	Failed to enter usable orbit	Failure
Geo-IK-2 #12 / Musson 2 #2 (Kosmos 2517)	4 June 2016; 14:00	Rokot/Briz-KM	936 km × 961 km, 99.28°	Operational
Geo-IK-2 #13 / Musson 2 #3 (Kosmos 2540)	30 August 2019; 14:00	Rokot/Briz-KM		Originally planned on a Soyuz-2-1v, switched to a Rokot in June 2017.

== See also ==
- Satellite geodesy
- List of Kosmos satellites (2501–2750)
