= Kosmos 2470 =

Russian geodesy satellite

- Mission type: Geodesy
- Operator: VKS
- COSPAR ID: 2011-005A
- SATCAT no.: 37362
- Mission duration: Launch failure

Spacecraft properties
- Spacecraft type: Geo-IK-2
- Manufacturer: ISS Reshetnev
- Launch mass: 1,400 kilograms (3,100 lb)

Start of mission
- Launch date: 1 February 2011, 14:00:14 UTC
- Rocket: Rokot/Briz-KM
- Launch site: Plesetsk 133/3

End of mission
- Last contact: 1 March 2011
- Decay date: 15 July 2013

Orbital parameters
- Reference system: Geocentric
- Regime: Low Earth
- Perigee altitude: 320 kilometres (200 mi)
- Apogee altitude: 1,052 kilometres (654 mi)
- Inclination: 99.4 degrees
- Period: 98.48 minutes
- Epoch: 8 February 2011

Kosmos 2470 (Russian: Космос 2470 meaning Cosmos 2470), also known as Geo-IK-2 No.11, was a Russian geodesy satellite launched in 2011. The first Geo-IK-2 satellite, it was intended to be used to create a three-dimensional map of the Earth's surface, and to monitor plate tectonics. The satellite was produced by ISS Reshetnev, and has a mass of around 1,400 kilograms (3,100 lb). It was intended to operate in a circular orbit at an altitude of around 1,000 kilometres (620 mi) above the Earth's surface; however, it was placed into a lower than planned orbit after its launch failed.

A second Geo-IK-2 satellite was successfully launched on June 4, 2016, as Kosmos 2517.

== History ==
Geo-IK-2 No.11 was launched by a Rokot rocket with a Briz-KM upper stage. The launch took place from Site 133/3 at the Plesetsk Cosmodrome, at 14:00 UTC on 1 February 2011. The Rokot performed as expected, and the Briz-KM made the first of two burns to place the satellite into its operational orbit. When the second burn was scheduled to begin, the Briz-KM failed to reignite, leaving the spacecraft in its transfer orbit. Controllers were unable to make contact with the satellite after launch as had been expected, although a day after launch they were able to establish communications with it. Before its orbit decayed from low Earth orbit, it flew a perigee of 368.8 kilometres (229.2 mi) and an apogee of 1,021.1 kilometres (634.5 mi), inclined at 99.4 degrees.

On 24 February 2011, Deputy Defence Minister Vladimir Popovkin announced that the satellite would be unable to fulfill its mission and thus would not be used by Russian defence forces. He added that it might still be possible to use the satellite for "checking control systems". On 1 March the satellite's orientation systems malfunctioned, and the spacecraft moved out of alignment with the Sun, resulting in its solar panels being unable to generate electricity. The spacecraft subsequently began to tumble. Engineers believed that it was unlikely that control would be re-established.

It re-entered Earth's atmosphere on July 15, 2013.

== Follow-ons ==
A second Geo-IK-2 satellite was successfully launched on June 4, 2016, as Kosmos 2517.
