= UR-100 =

Soviet ICBM

UR-100 SS-11 Sego
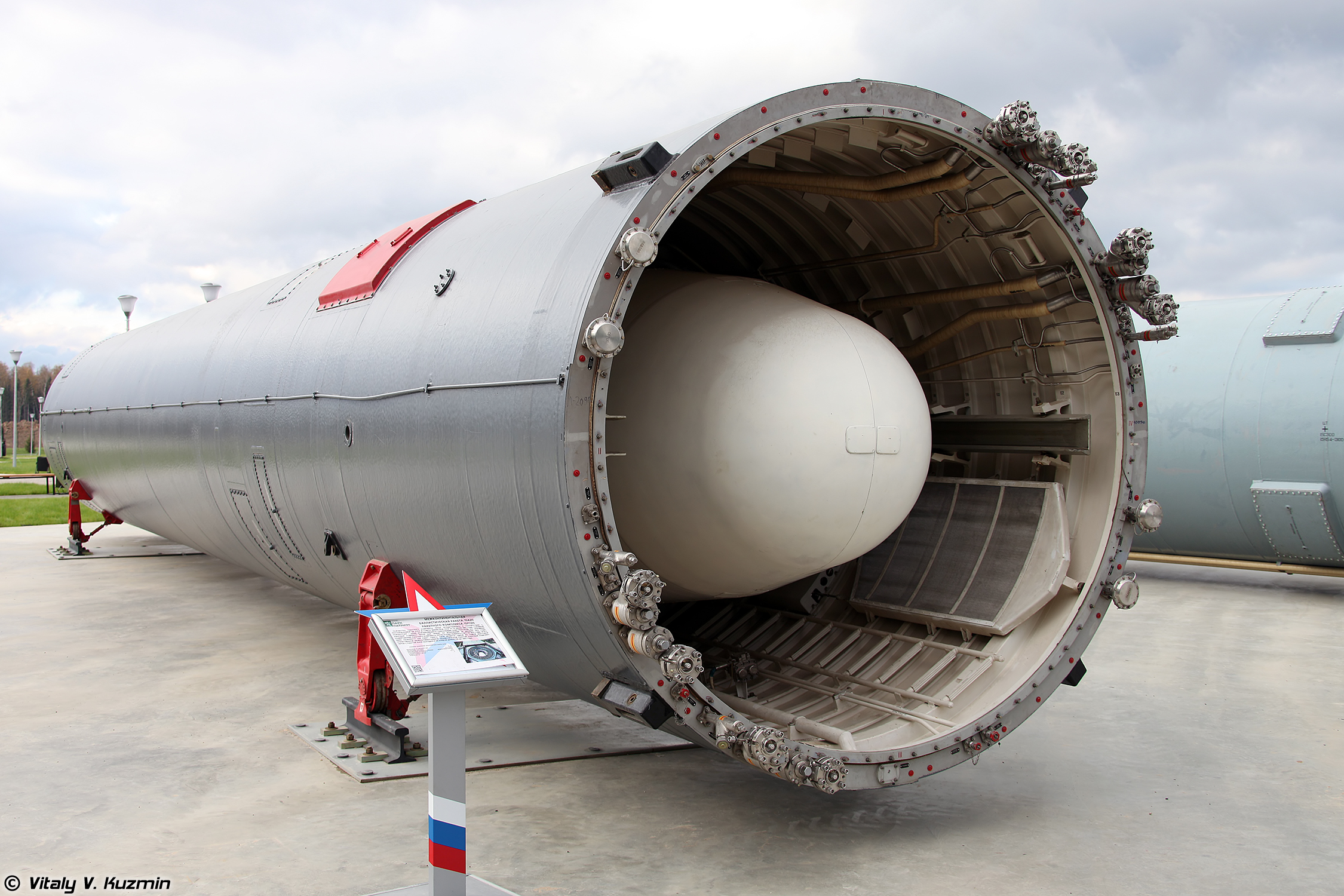
- Type: ICBM

Service history
- In service: 21 July 1967 (document №705-235)–1974
- Used by: Soviet Union

Production history
- Manufacturer: design by OKB-52 of V.N.Chelomey, production by Khrunichev Machine-Building Plant, Omsk aviation facility №166 "Polyot", Orenburg aviation facility №47 "Strela"

Specifications
- Mass: 41.4-42.3 tonnes
- Length: 16,930 mm (16.93 m)
- Diameter: 2,000 mm (2.0 m)
- Warhead: 1
- Blast yield: 1 Mt by NII-1011, Chelyabinsk-70
- Engine: two-stage liquid fuel: 1. first stage 8S816 with a 15D2 module (three RD-0216 and one RD-0217 engines); 2. second stage 8S817 with one 15D13 main and one four-nozzle 15D14 (RK-3) engines)
- Operational range: 10,600 km
- Guidance system: inertial
- Accuracy: 1000–1400 metres CEP

The UR-100 (Russian: УР-100) was an intercontinental ballistic missile (ICBM) developed and deployed by the Soviet Union from 1966 to 1996. UR (УР) in its designation stood for Universal Rocket (Russian: Универсальная Ракета). It was known during the Cold War by the NATO reporting name SS-11 Sego and internally by the GRAU index 8K84. The Strela and Rokot carrier rockets were based on it.

The similar designation UR-100MR (Russian: УР-100МР) actually refers to an entirely different missile, the MR-UR-100 Sotka (SS-17 Spanker).

== Description ==
The UR-100 was a two-stage liquid-propellant lightweight ICBM. Initial versions carried a single warhead of 0.5 to 1.1 Mt yield, while later versions could carry three or six MIRV warheads. The missile was silo-launched. 15P784 silo design (by KBOM, Design Bureau of Common Machinery, of V.P.Barmin) was greatly simplified in comparison to earlier missiles. Facilities consisted of hardened, unstaffed silos controlled by a single central command post. This was the first soviet ICBM (8K84M, entered service on 3 October 1971) equipped with missile defense countermeasure "Palma" by NII-108 of V.Gerasimenko.

=== Variants and developments ===
- UR-100 with 8K84 missile — original development
- UR-100 with 8K84M missile — improved variant
- UR-100N with 15A30 missile — enlarged UR-100. This variant is the basis of the Rokot space launch system.
- UR-100N UTTH with 15A35 missile — improved UR-100N (The "UTTH" (or "UTTKh") abbreviated suffix is often used in missile names. This means literally "improved tactical and technical characteristics", Russian: УТТХ = улучшенные тактико-технические характеристики)
- UR-100MR 15P015 with 15A15 missile — a different missile to replace the original UR-100

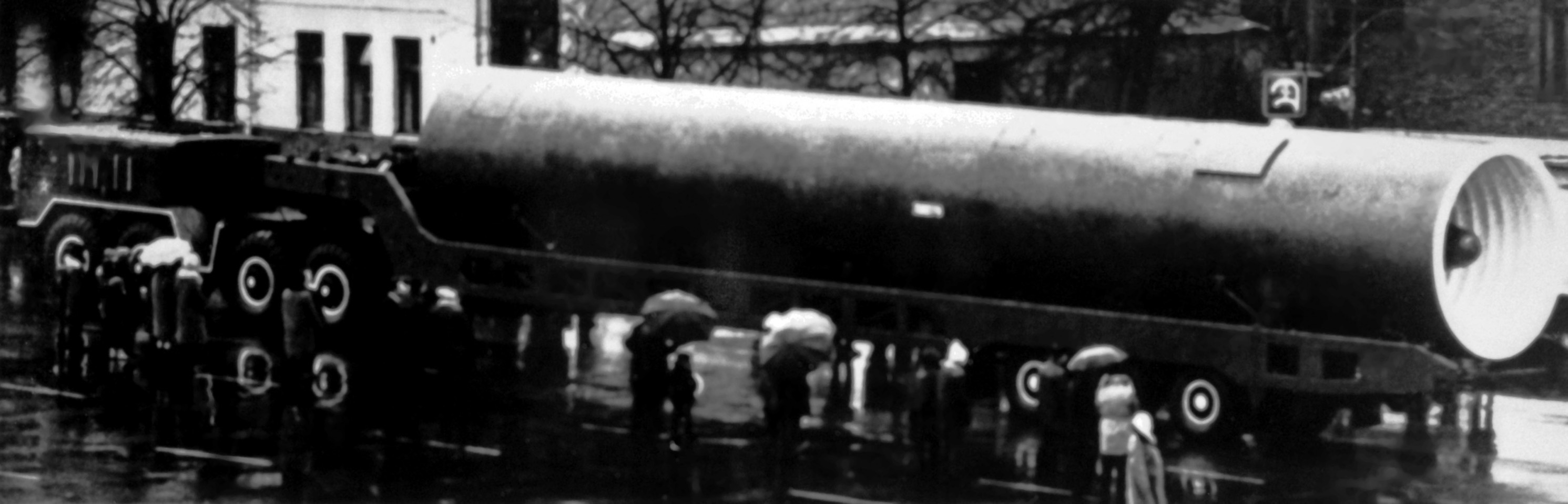

== Operational history ==
Soviet Union
The UR-100 reached initial operational capability with the Strategic Rocket Forces in 1966, and by 1972, 990 launchers had been deployed. An additional 420 launchers of newer version missiles were added by 1976. The missile was deployed as a counterpart to the United States' LGM-30 Minuteman, and relied on numbers for effectiveness. Original versions were phased out during the 1970s, but 326 of the newer missiles (8K84M, UR-100N, UR-100NUTTH) remained in service by 1991. These were phased out completely by 1996. Strategic Rocket Forces was the only operator of the UR-100.

Formations included:

- 4th Rocket Division (Drovyanaya, Chita Oblast) (53rd Rocket Army)

Some maintenance, storage, and issuing was carried out by the 29th Arsenal at Balezino-3, Udmurtiya.

=== As a space launcher ===
The Strela and Rokot carrier rockets are based on the UR-100.

== See also ==
- List of missiles
- List of rockets
