= RD-0237 =

RD-0237 (РД-0237)
- Country of origin: Soviet Union
- First flight: 1973-04-09
- Designer: OKB-154
- Application: gimbaling engine
- Associated LV: UR-100N and Strela
- Predecessor: RD-0225
- Status: Out of Production

Liquid-fuel engine
- Propellant: N_{2}O_{4} / UDMH
- Cycle: Pressure-Fed

Configuration
- Chamber: 1

Performance
- Thrust: 4.90 kilonewtons (1,100 lbf)
- Specific impulse, vacuum: 200 s (2.0 km/s)
- Gimbal range: +/- 45°

Used in
- UR-100N MIRV vehicle

The RD-0237 (Russian: Ракетный Двигатель-0237, romanized: Raketnyy Dvigatel-0237, lit. 'Rocket Engine 0237', GRAU index: 15D114) is a vernier thruster engine used on liquid-fueled rockets burning a hypergolic mixture of unsymmetrical dimethylhydrazine (UDMH) fuel with dinitrogen tetroxide (N_{2}O_{4}) oxidizer, pressure-fed to the engine. It is used on the UR-100UTTKh MIRV vehicle to supply thrust vector control by gimbaling of its nozzle. While the engine is out of production, the ICBM and Strela remain operational as of 2015.

== See also ==
- UR-100N - ICBM for which this engine was originally developed for.
- Strela
- liquid-fuel rocket
