= RD-0236 =

RD-0236 (РД-0236)
- Country of origin: Soviet Union
- First flight: 1973-04-09
- Designer: OKB-154
- Application: Vernier engine
- Associated LV: UR-100N, Rokot and Strela
- Status: Out of Production

Liquid-fuel engine
- Propellant: N_{2}O_{4} / UDMH
- Cycle: Gas Generator

Configuration
- Chamber: 4

Performance
- Thrust: 15.76 kilonewtons (3,540 lbf)
- Specific impulse, vacuum: 293 s (2.87 km/s)

Used in
- UR-100N second stage

The RD-0236 (Russian: Ракетный Двигатель-0236, romanized: Raketnyy Dvigatel-0236, lit. 'Rocket Engine 0236', GRAU index: 15D114) is a vernier thruster engine for liquid-fueled rockets. It burns a hypergolic mixture of unsymmetrical dimethylhydrazine (UDMH) fuel with dinitrogen tetroxide (N_{2}O_{4}) oxidizer in a gas generator cycle. It is used along the RD-0235 main engine on the UTTKh second stage, which was featured in the UR-100N ICBM as well as the Strela and Rokot launch vehicles derived from it. Its function is to supply thrust vector control by gimbaling each of its four nozzles in a plane. While the engine is out of production, the ICBM as well as Strela remain operational as of 2015. The Rokot launch vehicle conducted its final launch before retirement in December 2019.

== See also ==
- UR-100N - ICBM for which this engine was originally developed for.
- Rokot - launch vehicle that is a repurposed UR-100N.
- Strela - launch vehicle that is a repurposed UR-100N.
- Rocket engine using liquid fuel
