= Kosmos 2481 =

- Mission type: Communications
- Operator: VKO
- COSPAR ID: 2012-041A
- SATCAT no.: 38733

Spacecraft properties
- Spacecraft type: Strela-3
- Manufacturer: NPO PM
- Launch mass: 225 kilograms (496 lb)

Start of mission
- Launch date: 28 July 2012, 01:35 UTC
- Rocket: Rokot/Briz-KM
- Launch site: Plesetsk 133/3

Orbital parameters
- Reference system: Geocentric
- Regime: Low Earth
- Perigee altitude: 1,483 kilometres (921 mi)
- Apogee altitude: 1,511 kilometres (939 mi)
- Inclination: 82.48 degrees
- Period: 115.91 minutes

Kosmos 2481 (Russian: Космос 2481 meaning Cosmos 2481) is a Russian Strela-3 military communications satellite which was launched in 2012 by the Russian Aerospace Defence Forces. It was launched with 2 Gonets-M civilian communication satellites and a research satellite called Yubileiny-2, also known as MiR.

== Launch ==
Kosmos 2481 was launched from Site 133/3 at Plesetsk Cosmodrome in northern Russia. It was launched by a Rockot carrier rocket with a Briz-KM upper stage at 01:35 UTC on 28 July 2012. The launch successfully placed the satellite into low Earth orbit. It subsequently received its Kosmos designation, and the international designator 2012-041A. The United States Space Command assigned it the Satellite Catalog Number 38733.

The Russian military announced that the rocket was under control of the Titov Main Test and Space Systems Control Centre at 01:38 UTC and the satellites were released from the rocket at 03:19 UTC.

It was the first launch of a Rockot since February 2011 when a satellite was placed in the wrong orbit due to a problem with the upper stage.

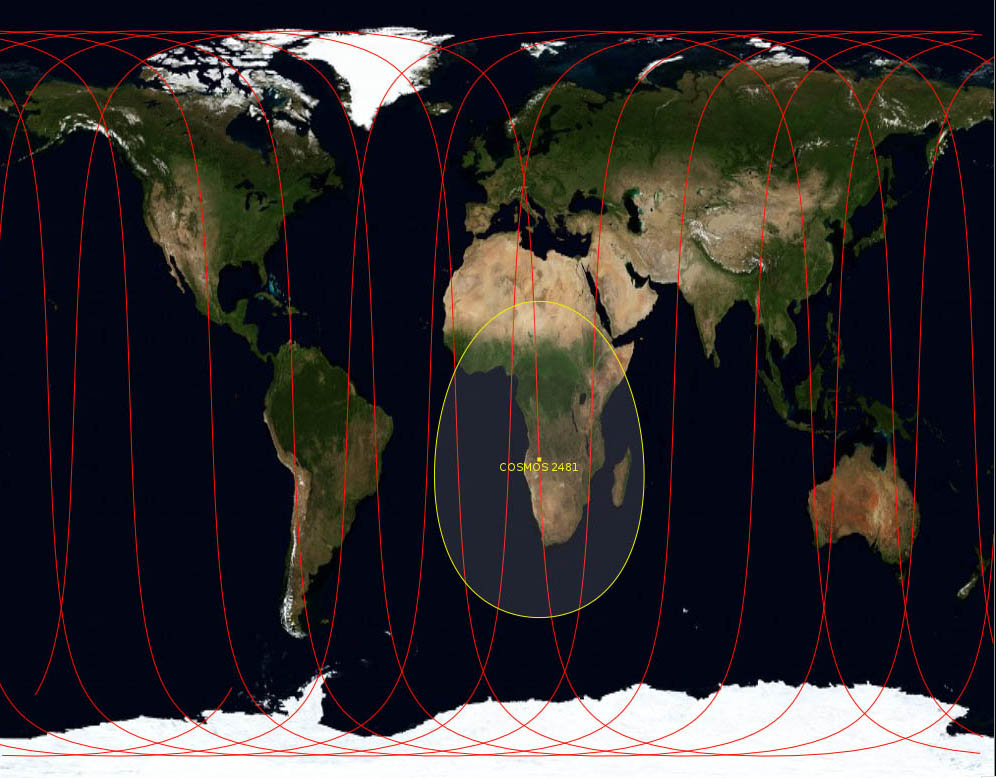
Ground track of Kosmos 2481

== Strela-3 ==
Kosmos 2481 is a Strela-3 satellite. They are described as store-dump communications satellites which receive information from the ground when they pass overhead, and store that information until they pass over the ground station they deliver the information to. The satellites are in low Earth orbit going round the Earth every 116 minutes. A full deployment of Strela-3 craft should consist of twelve satellites. The satellite has the GRAU index 17F13, showing it is a Strela-3, not a Strela-3M (also called Rodnik) as they have a GRAU index of 17F132.

Strela-3 has a civilian variant called Gonets which is used by the Russian government for communication in remote areas. It can take between two minutes and six hours to deliver messages.

The previous satellites of this class, Kosmos 2467 and Kosmos 2468, were launched together on 8 September 2010.

== See also ==
- List of Kosmos satellites (2251–2500)
