= RD-0233 =

RD-0233 (РД-0233)
- Country of origin: Soviet Union
- First flight: 1973-04-09
- Designer: OKB-154
- Associated LV: UR-100N, Rokot and Strela
- Status: Out of Production

Liquid-fuel engine
- Propellant: N_{2}O_{4} / UDMH
- Cycle: Oxidizer Rich Staged Combustion

Configuration
- Chamber: 1

Performance
- Thrust: 520 kilonewtons (120,000 lbf)
- Chamber pressure: 20.5 megapascals (2,970 psi)
- Specific impulse, vacuum: 310 s (3.0 km/s)
- Specific impulse, sea-level: 285 s (2.79 km/s)
- Burn time: 121 seconds

Used in
- UR-100N core stage

The RD-0233 (Russian: Ракетный Двигатель-0233, romanized: Raketnyy Dvigatel-0233, lit. 'Rocket Engine 0233', GRAU index: 15D95) and RD-0234 (GRAU index: 15D96) are liquid-fueled rocket engines which burn a hypergolic mixture of unsymmetrical dimethylhydrazine (UDMH) fuel with dinitrogen tetroxide (N_{2}O_{4}) oxidizer in an oxidizer-rich staged combustion cycle. The only difference between the RD-0233 and the RD-0234 is that the latter has a heat exchanger to heat the pressurizing gases for the tanks. Three RD-0233 and one RD-0234 are used on the first stage of the UR-100UTTKh ICBM. While the engine is out of production, the ICBM as well as Rokot and Strela remain operational as of 2015.

== See also ==
- UR-100N - ICBM for which this engine was originally developed for.
- Rokot - launch vehicle that is a repurposed UR-100N.
- Strela - launch vehicle that is a repurposed UR-100N.
- Rocket engine using liquid fuel
