= Japan Space Systems =

Japanese nonprofit organization

Japan Space Systems (般財団法人宇宙システム開発利用推進機構, Ippan Zaidan Hōjin Uchū Shisutemu Kaihatsu Riyō Suishin Kikō), or JSS, is a Japanese space agency. It was founded in 2012 with the merger of three independent organizations: the Institute for Unmanned Space Experiment Free Flyer (USEF), the Earth Remote Sensing Data Analysis Center (ERSDAC) and Japan Resources Observation System Organization (JAROS). JSS specializes in the development and applications for earth observation satellites and satellite navigation. It has collaborated with other national and international space agencies such as NASA and the International Space Station programme.

== History ==
On 30 March 2012, three organizations merged to form Japan Space Systems: Institute for Unmanned Space Experiment Free Flyer (USEF), the Earth Remote Sensing Data Analysis Center (ERSDAC) and Japan Resources Observation System Organization (JAROS). JSS is formed as a General Incorporated Foundation (一般財団法人) under the Ministry of Economy, Trade and Industry (METI). Before the merger, the three organizations are independently administered by METI.

In 2021, JSS expanded its operations by merging with the Satellite Positioning Research and Application Center (SPAC). The latter is now a division of JSS.

== Goal ==
The aim of USEF is technology development, especially the testing of commercial off-the-shelf parts (COTS), robotics, material sciences, and technology for optical earth observations.

== Launch vehicle ==
Unlike the Japan Aerospace Exploration Agency (JAXA), Japan Space Systems doesn't have its own launch vehicle. Instead, it has used either the H-IIA, the M-3S, or Russian rockets, so far. However, in 2008, METI mentioned the possibility of JSS developing an air-launched vehicle for small payloads.

== Completed missions ==
=== EXPRESS ===
The Experiment Re-entry Space System (EXPRESS) was a 745 kg (1,642 lbs) satellite for microgravity experiments and testing of re-entry technologies. The project was done in cooperation with ISAS (now JAXA) and DLR of Germany. On January 15, 1995, it was launched on the M-3S. However, due to a problem with the rocket, the orbit was much lower than planned. The re-entry capsule was found later in Ghana.

=== USERS ===
Unmanned Space Experiment Recovery System (USERS) was launched on the H-IIA on 10 September 2002. The aim of the mission was microgravity experiments to perform the Super-Conductor Material Processing Experiment and also testing of satellite bus technologies. For the first part of the mission, USERS carried a return capsule. It was retrieved successfully on 29 May 2003. The mission of the main orbiter ended during re-entry in 2007.

=== SERVIS 1 ===
The SERVIS-1 is an 840 kg (1,851 lbs) technology test mission with COTS parts. It was launched on 30 October 2003 using a Rockot carrier rocket. the mission duration was two years.

=== SERVIS 2 ===
SERVIS-2 was a 900 kg (1,984 lbs) technology test mission with COTS parts. It will continue the experiments done with the first SERVIS satellite. It was launched on 2 June 2010 with a Rockot carrier rocket.

== ASNARO missions ==
=== ASNARO 1 ===
ASNARO-1, the first of "Advanced Satellite with New system Architecture Observation" series, is a 450 kg (992 lb) earth observation satellite. The expected resolution is less than 0.5 meter (1.6 ft) from an SSO orbit. The satellite was launched on 6 November 2014 by a Dnepr rocket from Yasniy, Russia.

=== ASNARO 2 ===
ASNARO 2 is small X-band radar satellite for Earth observation. The satellite was launched on 17 January 2018 by an Epsilon rocket.

== Other technology projects ==
USEF developed the robotic arm of the ETS-VII project to test docking technology in the 1990s.

Demonstration of Green Propellant reaction control system (GPRCS) was originally under development for SERVIS-3 project. Eventually it was launched and demonstrated successfully aboard RAPIS-1 in 2019.

Hyperspectral Imager Suite (HISUI) was launched aboard SpaceX CRS-19 on 5 December 2019 to the International Space Station and installed at the External Facility of the Japanese Experiment Module Kibo.
