= Rokot =

Russian space launch vehicle

Rockot (Rokot)
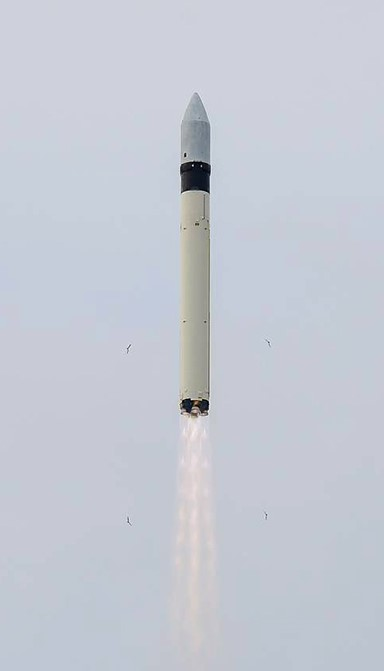
- Rokot launch vehicle
- Function: Orbital launch vehicle
- Manufacturer: Khrunichev State Research and Production Space Center
- Country of origin: Soviet Union
- Cost per launch: US$41.8 million

Size
- Height: 29 m (95 ft)
- Diameter: 2.5 m (8 ft 2 in)
- Mass: 107,000 kg (236,000 lb)
- Stages: 3

Capacity

Payload to Low Earth orbit
- Mass: 1,950 kg (4,300 lb)

Payload to Sun-synchronous orbit
- Mass: 1,200 kg (2,600 lb)

Launch history
- Status: Retired
- Launch sites: Baikonur, 175/1; Plesetsk, 133/3
- Total launches: 34
- Success(es): 31
- Failure: 2
- Partial failure: 1
- First flight: 20 November 1990; 26 December 1994 (orbital)
- Last flight: 26 December 2019

First stage
- Diameter: 2.5 m (8 ft 2 in)
- Powered by: 3 RD-0233 (15D95); 1 RD-0234 (15D96)
- Maximum thrust: 2,080 kN (470,000 lb_{f})
- Specific impulse: 310 s (3.0 km/s)
- Burn time: 120 seconds
- Propellant: N_{2}O_{4} / UDMH

Second stage
- Diameter: 2.5 m (8 ft 2 in)
- Powered by: 1 RD-0235 (15D113); 1 RD-0236 (15D114)
- Maximum thrust: 255.76 kN (57,500 lb_{f})
- Specific impulse: 310 s (3.0 km/s)
- Burn time: 180 seconds
- Propellant: N_{2}O_{4} / UDMH

Third stage – Briz-KM
- Powered by: 1 S5.98M
- Maximum thrust: 19.6 kN (4,400 lb_{f})
- Specific impulse: 326 s (3.20 km/s)
- Burn time: 3,000 seconds
- Propellant: N_{2}O_{4} / UDMH

Rokot (Russian: Рокот meaning Rumble or Boom), also transliterated Rockot, was a Soviet Union (later Russian) space launch vehicle that was capable of launching a payload of 1,950 kilograms (4,300 lb) into a 200-kilometre (120 mi) Earth orbit with 63° inclination. It was based on the UR-100N (SS-19 Stiletto) intercontinental ballistic missile (ICBM), supplied and operated by Khrunichev State Research and Production Space Center. The first launches started in the 1990s from Baikonur Cosmodrome out of a silo. Later commercial launches commenced from Plesetsk Cosmodrome using a launch ramp specially rebuilt from one for the Kosmos-3M launch vehicle. The cost of the launcher itself was about US$15 million in 1999; The contract with European Space Agency (ESA) for launching Swarm in September 2013 was worth €27.1 million (US$36 million).

== Specifications ==
Rokot's total mass was 107 tonnes, its length 29 metres and its maximum diameter 2.5 metres. The liquid-fueled launch vehicle comprised three stages. The lower two were based on the Soviet UR-100N ICBM; the first stage used an RD-0233 / RD-0234 engine complex, while the second stage used an RD-0235. The third stage was a Briz-KM (Russian: Бриз-КМ meaning Breeze-KM), which has a mass of about 6 tonnes when fuelled, and is capable of flying for 7 hours and reigniting its engine six times during flight, allowing different satellites to be placed into different orbits. All stages used unsymmetrical dimethylhydrazine (UDMH) as fuel and dinitrogen tetroxide (N_{2}O_{4}) as oxidiser. The Strela is a similar rocket, also based on the SS-19.

== History ==
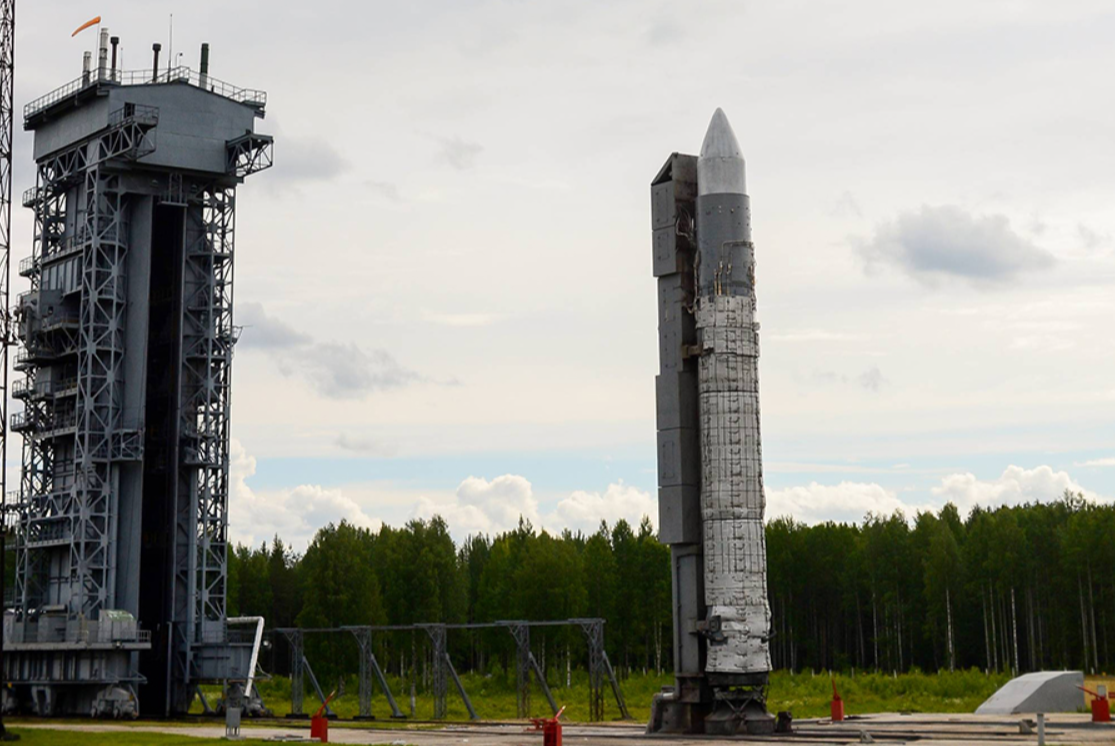
Preparing the Rokot launch vehicle for launch. Plesetsk cosmodrome

The first suborbital test launch succeeded on 20 November 1990 from Baikonur Cosmodrome. On 26 December 1994, Rokot brought its first satellite into Earth orbit. In 1995, Khrunichev State Research and Production Space Center formed a company with German DaimlerBenz Aerospace to market Rokot launches for commercial use. Later, the company was renamed to Eurockot Launch Services. Eurockot bought 45 Rokots from the Russian strategic missile forces to build its inventory. In 2000, Eurokot was partly bought by the German company Astrium GmbH, a shareholder of Arianespace. Astrium then held 51% of Eurockot's shares, while Khrunichev held 49%.

Although there are several silos in Baikonur capable of launching Rokots, it was decided to build an open, non-siloed launch pad at Plesetsk Cosmodrome instead. This is because of concerns that the amount of noise generated during a silo-based launch would damage satellites. In the new pad, Rokot was wheeled up to the structure in a vertical position, and then embraced by its launch tower. The payload was lifted by a crane and placed on top of the bottom two stages. The procedure was in contrast to other Russian launchers, which had traditionally been assembled horizontally and then transferred to the launch site via railways. The first launch from Plesetsk took place on 16 May 2000.

After six entirely successful launches, a launch failure occurred on 8 October 2005, leading to the loss of the European Space Agency's CryoSat spacecraft. The launch vehicle's second stage main engine did not shut down properly, leading to a catastrophic failure and the automatic termination of the launch mission by the onboard computer. As a result, the payload was lost. Following the failed CryoSat launch, all Rokot launches were suspended until the cause of the failure was identified. The root cause was unambiguously identified; it was a failure in programming of the Briz-KM (which was contracted to the company JSC "Khartron"). The failure of this high-profile mission led to major reforms in Khrunichev: the director of the company Alexander Medvedev was dismissed, new launch procedures were introduced, the lines of management were straightened out to catch errors and the new Khrunichev chief, Viktor Nesterov, was required to report directly to the head of the Russian Space Agency, Anatoli Perminov. Corrective measures for Rokot's return-to-flight were implemented for the South Korean KOMPSAT-2 Earth observation satellite launch which took place successfully on 28 July 2006. The Korean side reportedly praised the level of service they received, encouraging the Rokot team to rebuild its order book.

Another launch failure occurred in February 2011, when a Briz-KM malfunction resulted in the Geo-IK-2 No.11 (Kosmos-2470) satellite being placed into a lower orbit than planned.

The Rokot version with a Ukrainian control system stopped flying after 2019, due to Ukraine's ban on technology exports to Russia. Rokot had its final flight on 26 December 2019. A fully Russian-made Rokot light carrier rocket, named Rokot-M, was expected to begin operations in 2024. The Rokot-M launch vehicle is intended for the Ministry of Defense of Russia.

== Launch history ==
=== Rokot ===
Flight No.	Date / time (UTC)	Rocket, Configuration	Launch site	Payload	Payload mass	Orbit	Customer	Launch outcome
1	20 November 1990; 04:00	Rokot/Briz-K	Baikonur, Site 131/29	Experimental Payload				Success
1	Suborbital test flight							
2	20 December 1991; 21:31	Rokot/Briz-K	Baikonur, Site 175/58	Experimental Payload				Success
2	Suborbital test flight							
3	26 December 1994; 03:01	Rokot/Briz-K	Baikonur, Site 175/58	Radio-ROSTO				Success
3	First orbital mission. Amateur radio satellite							
N/A	22 December 1999	Rokot/Briz-K	Plesetsk, Site 133/3	RSVN-40				Precluded (failure pre-flight)
N/A	No launch, launch vehicle irreparably damaged during preparation. Experimental payload.							
4	16 May 2000; 08:27	Rokot/Briz-KM	Plesetsk, Site 133/3	SimSat-1 and 2				Success
4	Iridium-mock-ups							
5	17 March 2002; 09:21	Rokot/Briz-KM	Plesetsk, Site 133/3	GRACE-1 and 2				Success
5	NASA research satellite							
6	20 June 2002; 09:33	Rokot/Briz-KM	Plesetsk, Site 133/3	Iridium-97 and 98				Success
6	Communication satellites							
7	30 June 2003; 14:15	Rokot/Briz-KM	Plesetsk, Site 133/3	MIMOSA; DTUsat; MOST; Cute-I; QuakeSat; AAU CubeSat; CanX-1; CubeSat Xi-IV; Monitor-E mockup				Success
7	NLS satellites and Monitor-E-Mockup							
8	30 October 2003; 13:43	Rokot/Briz-KM	Plesetsk Site 133/3	SERVIS-1				Success
8	Japanese test satellite							
9	26 August 2005; 18:34	Rokot/Briz-KM	Plesetsk Site 133/3	Monitor-E1				Success
9	Earth observation satellite							
10	8 October 2005; 15:02	Rokot/Briz-KM	Plesetsk Site 133/3	CryoSat				Failure
10	Earth observation satellite. Launch terminated after 2nd stage main engine was not shut down correctly, resulting in an explosion, causing the vehicle to exceed its flight envelope limit and thereby causing the automatic termination of the launch and the re-entry of the combined Rokot 2nd stage/3rd stage/CryoSat spacecraft stack							
11	28 July 2006; 07:05	Rokot/Briz-KM	Plesetsk Site 133/3	KOMPSAT-2				Success
11	Earth observation satellite							
12	23 May 2008; 15:20	Rokot/Briz-KM	Plesetsk Site 133/3	Kosmos 2437; Kosmos 2438; Kosmos 2439 (3X Strela-3); Yubileiny				Success
12	Communications and amateur radio satellites							
13	17 March 2009; 14:21	Rokot/Briz-KM	Plesetsk Site 133/3	GOCE				Success
13	ESA Earth observation satellite							
14	6 July 2009; 01:26	Rokot/Briz-KM	Plesetsk Site 133/3	Kosmos 2451; Kosmos 2452; Kosmos 2453 (3X Strela-3)				Success
14	Communications satellites							
15	2 November 2009; 01:50	Rokot/Briz-KM	Plesetsk Site 133/3	SMOS; PROBA-2				Success
15	SMOS: ESA Earth-observation satellite; PROBA-2: Sun-observation satellite testing a new spacecraft platform							
16	2 June 2010; 01:59	Rokot/Briz-KM	Plesetsk Site 133/3	SERVIS-2				Success
16	Japanese test satellite							
17	8 September 2010; 03:30	Rokot/Briz-KM	Plesetsk Site 133/3	Gonets-M-2; Kosmos 2467; Kosmos 2468 (2X Strela-3)				Success
17	Communications satellites							
18	1 February 2011; 14:00	Rokot/Briz-KM	Plesetsk Site 133/3	Geo-IK-2 No.11				Failure
18	Geodesy satellite. Upper stage malfunction, reached lower orbit than planned.							
19	28 July 2012; 01:35	Rokot/Briz-KM	Plesetsk Site 133/3	Gonets-M-3; Gonets-M-4; Kosmos 2481 (Strela-3); MiR				Success
19	Communications and amateur radio satellites							
20	15 January 2013; 16:25	Rokot/Briz-KM	Plesetsk Site 133/3	Kosmos 2482; Kosmos 2483; Kosmos 2484 (3X Strela-3M)				Partial failure
20	Communications satellites. Briz-KM failed around the time of spacecraft separation, resulting in the loss of one satellite							
21	11 September 2013; 23:23	Rokot/Briz-KM	Plesetsk Site 133/3	Gonets-M-5; Gonets-M-6; Gonets-M-7				Success
21	Communications satellites							
22	22 November 2013; 12:02	Rokot/Briz-KM	Plesetsk Site 133/3	Swarm A/B/C				Success
22	Magnetosphere research satellites; Briz-km failed deorbit burn							
23	25 December 2013; 00:31	Rokot/Briz-KM	Plesetsk Site 133/3	Kosmos 2488; Kosmos 2489; Kosmos 2490 (3X Strela-3M) Kosmos 2491				Success
23	Communications satellites							
24	23 May 2014; 05:27	Rokot/Briz-KM	Plesetsk Site 133/3	Kosmos 2496; Kosmos 2497; Kosmos 2498 (3X Strela-3M); Kosmos 2499				Success
24	Communications satellites							
25	3 July 2014; 12:43	Rokot/Briz-KM	Plesetsk Site 133/3	Gonets-M-8; Gonets-M-9; Gonets-M-10				Success
25	Communications satellites							
26	31 March 2015; 13:47	Rokot/Briz-KM	Plesetsk Site 133/3	Gonets-M-11; Gonets-M-12; Gonets-M-13; Kosmos 2504				Success
26	Communications satellites							
27	23 September 2015; 22:00	Rokot/Briz-KM	Plesetsk Site 133/3	Kosmos 2507; Kosmos 2508; Kosmos 2509 (3X Strela-3M)				Success
27	Communications satellites							
28	16 February 2016; 17:57	Rokot/Briz-KM	Plesetsk Site 133/3	Sentinel-3A				Success
28	ESA earth observation satellite							
29	4 June 2016; 14:00	Rokot/Briz-KM	Plesetsk Site 133/3	Kosmos 2517 (Geo-IK-2 No.12)				Success
29	Geodesy satellite							
30	13 October 2017; 09:27	Rokot/Briz-KM	Plesetsk Site 133/3	Sentinel-5 Precursor				Success
30	Earth observation satellite							
31	25 April 2018; 17:57	Rokot/Briz-KM	Plesetsk Site 133/3	Sentinel-3B				Success
31	Earth observation satellite							
32	30 November 2018; 02:27	Rokot/Briz-KM	Plesetsk Site 133/3	Kosmos 2530; Kosmos 2531; Kosmos 2532 (3X Strela-3M)				Success
32	Communications satellites. After launch, NORAD tracked another object (besides the Briz-KM upper stage) which could possibly be a fourth satellite.							
33	30 August 2019; 14:00	Rokot/Briz-KM	Plesetsk Site 133/3	Kosmos 2540 (Geo-IK-2 No.13)				Success
33	Geodesy satellite							
34	26 December 2019; 23:11	Rokot/Briz-KM	Plesetsk Site 133/3	Gonets-M-14; Gonets-M-15; Gonets-M-16; BLITS-M				Success
34	Final flight of Rokot; Communications and geodesy satellites;							

=== Rokot-M ===
Flight No.	Date / time (UTC)	Rocket, Configuration	Launch site	Payload	Payload mass	Orbit	Customer	Launch outcome
1	NET December 2024	Rokot-M/Briz-KM2	Plesetsk Site 133/3	No Payload (Test Flight)				TBD
1	First test flight of Rokot-M/Briz-KM2							

== See also ==
- Dnepr (rocket)
- Comparison of orbital launchers families
