= NPO Mashinostroyeniya =

Rocket design company

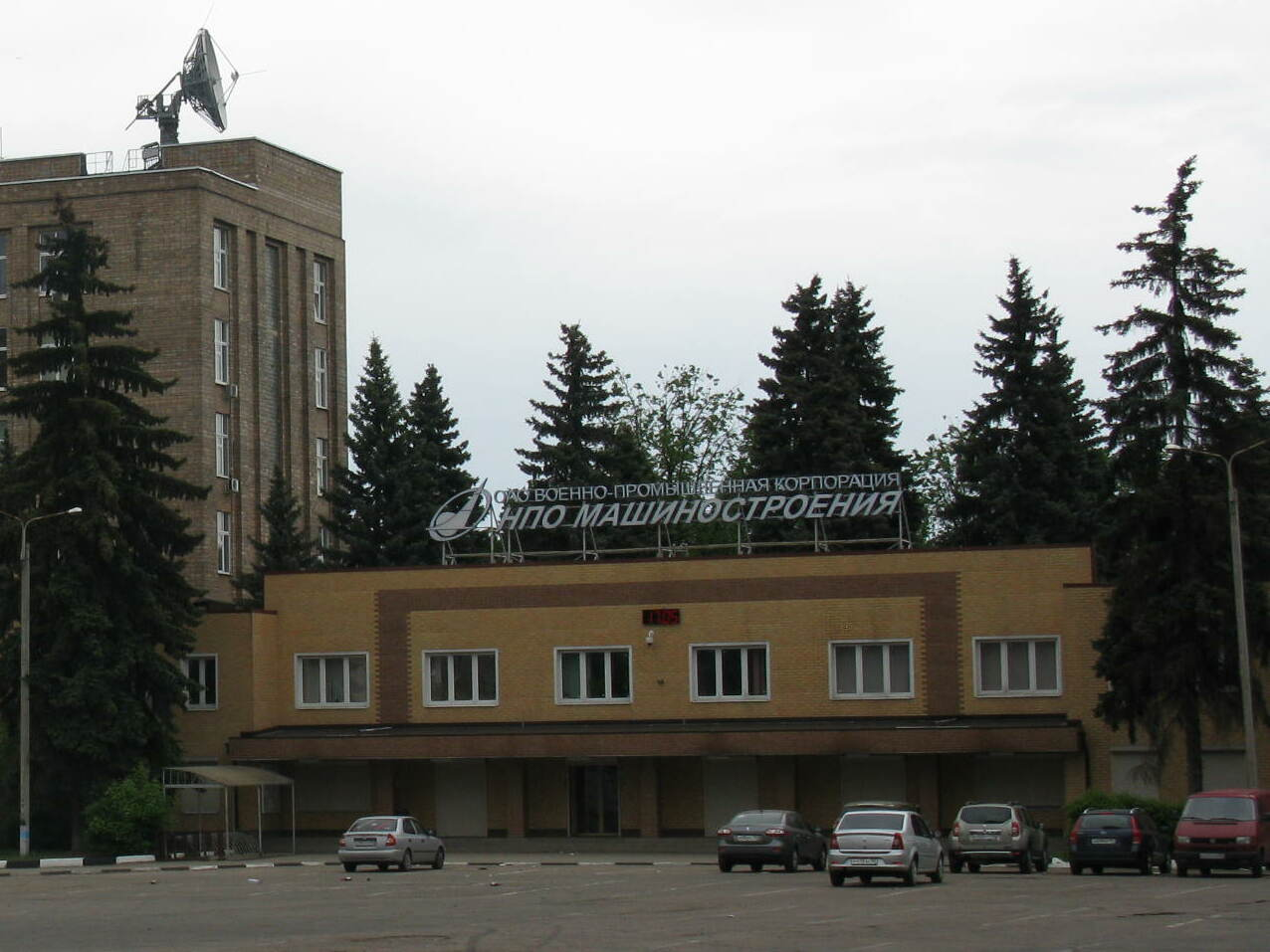
- NPO Mashinostroyeniya design bureau in Reutov
- Formerly: OKB-52
- Company type: Joint-stock company
- Industry: Defense industry Aerospace industry Space industry
- Founded: 1944
- Headquarters: Reutov, Russia
- Products: Missiles, Ballistic missiles, Cruise missiles, Anti-ship missiles, Spacecraft, Launch vehicles
- Revenue: $464 million (2014)
- Parent: Tactical Missiles Corporation
- Website: npomash.ru

NPO Mashinostroyeniya (Russian: НПО машиностроения, lit. 'RDA of machine manufacturing') is a rocket design bureau based in Reutov, Russia. During the Cold War it was responsible for several major weapons systems, including the UR-100N Intercontinental ballistic missile and the military Almaz space station program.

India is Mashinostroyeniya's second largest customer after the Russian Federation for sale of P-70 Ametist, BrahMos, BrahMos-II and P-800 Oniks.

== History ==
NPO Mashinostroyeniya was founded in 1944 to develop rockets for the Russian military. Under the leadership of cruise missile designer Vladimir Chelomey, the firm was lead developer of the Soviet Union's space satellites, cruise missiles, and intercontinental ballistic missiles. Originally part of the OKB-51 design bureau, it relocated to Reutov, and from 1955 to 1966 was designated OKB-52 (and also OKB-52 MAP). OKB-52 became later known as TsKBM.

The OKB-52 was the main rival of OKB-1 (then the design bureau of Sergei Korolev, later renamed TsKBEM, today RSC Energia) during the Soviet human lunar programs and the Soviet space station program.

At its peak in the mid-1980s, NPO Mashinostroyeniya employed nearly 10,000. By the mid-1980s state support for NPO was dwindling. In the 1980s, the Soviet government directed NPO to develop vegetable oil processing equipment, baking industry equipment, and food storage products. By 1993, Mashinostroyeniya's defense orders dwindled to one-fifth of previous levels.

On July 16, 2014, the Obama administration imposed sanctions through the US Department of Treasury's Office of Foreign Assets Control (OFAC) by adding NPO Mashinostroyeniya and other entities to the Specially Designated Nationals List (SDN) in retaliation for the ongoing Russo-Ukrainian War. ScarCruft and the Lazarus Group allegedly hacked company systems in 2021, according to reports published by cybersecurity firm SentinelOne.

== Spacecraft ==
=== Air launched orbital vehicles ===
- 17K-AM

=== Crewed spacecraft ===
- VA spacecraft

=== Space launched vehicles ===
- Strela (rocket)
- UR-100
- UR-200

== Missiles ==
=== Anti-ship missiles ===
- P-70 Ametist (NATO codename: SS-N-7 Starbright)
- P-120 Malakhit (NATO codename: SS-N-9 Siren)
- P-500 Bazalt (NATO codename: SS-N-12 Sandbox)
- P-700 Granit (NATO codename: SS-N-19 Shipwreck)
- P-800 Oniks (NATO codename: SS-N-26 Strobile)
- Zircon (missile)

== See also ==
- Proton satellite
- KSShch
- BrahMos
- 10Kh
