= Strela (rocket) =

Soviet/Russian carrier rocket

- The Strela carrier rocket
- Function: Orbital carrier rocket
- Manufacturer: NPO Mashinostroyeniya, JSC "Khartron", Ukraine (control system)
- Country of origin: Russia

Size
- Height: 28.3 metres (93 ft)
- Diameter: 2.5 metres (8.2 ft)
- Mass: 105,000 kilograms (231,000 lb)
- Stages: 3

Capacity

Payload to LEO
- Mass: 1,400 kilograms (3,100 lb)

Associated rockets
- Family: Universal Rocket

Launch history
- Status: Inactive
- Launch sites: Baikonur Cosmodrome
- Total launches: 3
- Success(es): 3
- First flight: 5 December 2003

First stage
- Diameter: 2.5 m (8.2 ft)
- Powered by: 3 RD-0233 (15D95); 1 RD-0234 (15D96)
- Maximum thrust: 2,080 kN (470,000 lbf)
- Specific impulse: 310 s
- Burn time: 120 seconds
- Propellant: N_{2}O_{4} / UDMH

Second stage
- Diameter: 2.5 m (8.2 ft)
- Powered by: 1 RD-0235 (15D113); 1 RD-0236 (15D114)
- Maximum thrust: 255.76 kN (57,500 lbf)
- Specific impulse: 310 s
- Burn time: 180 seconds
- Propellant: N_{2}O_{4} / UDMH

Third stage – APB (Agregatno-Priborny Otsek)
- Powered by: 1 RD-0237 (15D114)
- Maximum thrust: 4.90 kilonewtons (1,100 lb_{f})
- Specific impulse: 200 s
- Propellant: N_{2}O_{4} / UDMH

External images
- Strela launch vehicle launch 19.12.2014
- Strela launch vehicle launch 19.12.2014
- Strela launch vehicle launch 19.12.2014

Strela (Russian: Стрела, arrow) is a Russian orbital carrier rocket, derived from the Soviet/Russian UR-100NU missile. It conducted its maiden test launch on 5 December 2003, carried its first functional payload on 27 June 2013, and a second one on 19 December 2014.

Strela was originally planned to be launched from the Svobodny Cosmodrome, with test launches being conducted from existing UR-100 silos at the Baikonur Cosmodrome. Svobodny was closed in 2007, without seeing any Strela launches. It is unclear whether a Strela launch complex will be incorporated into the Vostochny Cosmodrome.

Strela differs from the Rockot, which is also derived from the UR-100, in that it has undergone fewer modifications, such as the absence of an additional Briz-KM upper stage, as used on the Rockot. However it is equipped with a repurposed APB as upper stage, which was originally a maneuvrable warhead "bus" from MIRV system of UR-100 missile. It is also launched from silos, whereas the Rockot is launched from flat pads.

== Launch history ==
Date (UTC)	Type	Launch site	Payload	Payload type	Outcome
5 December 2003, 06:00	Strela	Ba LC175	Gruzomaket	test launch	Success
27 June 2013, 16:53	Strela	Ba LC175	Kondor	research satellite	Success
19 December 2014, 04:43	Strela	Ba LC175	Kondor-E	research satellite	Success

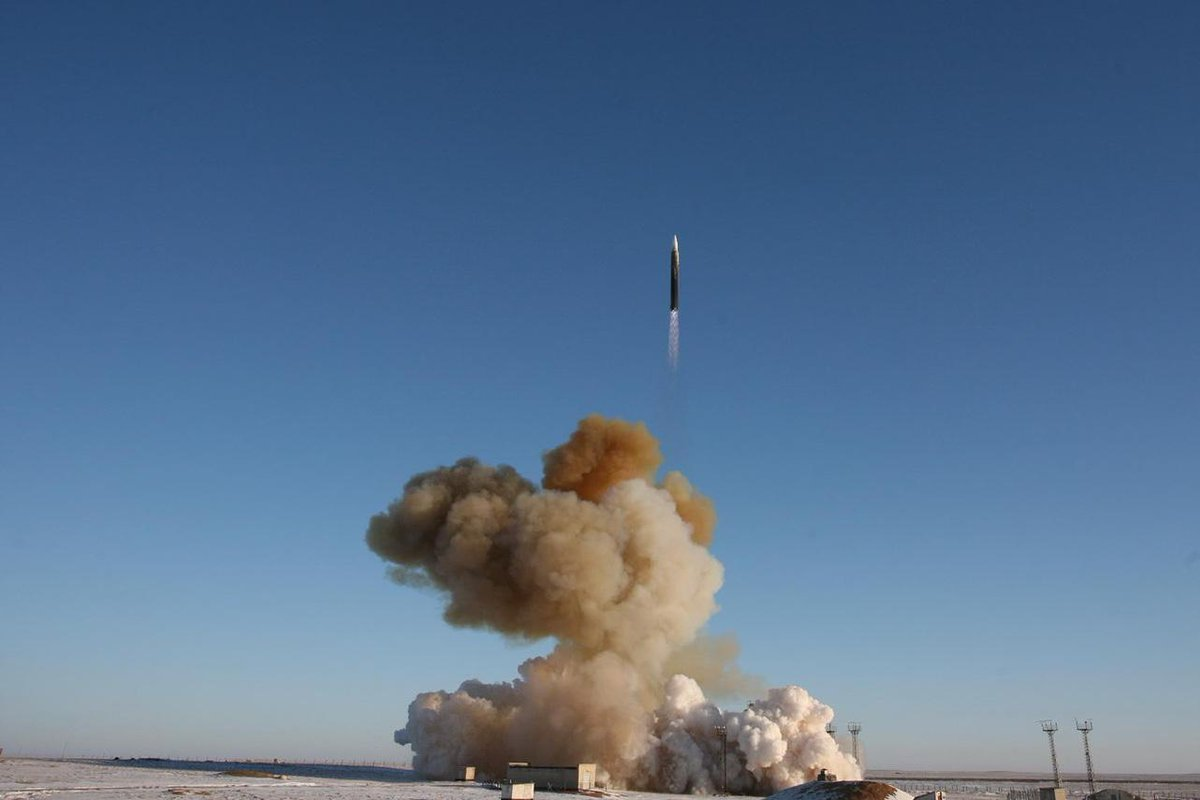
Launch of Kondor-E1 on Strela rocket, 19 December 2014

== See also ==
- Comparison of orbital launchers families
- Comparison of orbital launch systems
- Dnepr rocket
- 9K32 Strela-2, a soviet shoulder-launched Surface-to-air missile, developed in the 1970s
