= Kosmos 2452 =

Russian military communications satellite

Kosmos 2452 is a Russian military communications satellite. It was launched July 6, 2009, at 1:26 UTC. It was launched by a Rokot launch vehicle from the Plesetsk Cosmodrome to a 1,400 km circular orbit and a high inclination (~82 degrees).

It was the second Strela 3M satellite and was launched with two other satellites. Strela-3M (also known as Rodnik-S) is an improved version of the Strela-3 military communications satellite.

Satellites of this type record digital information and then forward the stored data when the satellite is in view of a receiving antenna. This approach is used for communications in remote area lacking more traditional ground-based communications channels.
