= List of Proton launches (2010–2019) =

This is a list of launches made by the Proton rocket between 2010 and 2019. All launches were conducted from the Baikonur Cosmodrome.

== Launch statistics ==
=== Rocket configurations ===
- Proton-M 11S43
- Proton-M 11S861
- Proton-M 11S861-03
- Proton-K 11S861

=== Launch sites ===
- Baikonur Site 81/24
- Baikonur Site 200/39

=== Launch outcomes ===
- Failure
- Partial failure
- Success
- Planned

== Launch history ==
=== 2010 ===
Flight No.	Date / time (UTC)	Rocket, Configuration	Launch site	Payload	Payload mass	Orbit	Users	Launch outcome
535-35	28 January 2010; 00:18:00	Proton-M/Briz-M 8K82KM/11S43	Site 81/24	Raduga 1M #2		Geosynchronous		Success
535-35	Communications							
535-32	12 February 2010; 00:39:40	Proton-M/Briz-M 8K82KM/11S43	Site 200/39	Intelsat 16		Geosynchronous transfer		Success
535-32	Communications. Commercial launch conducted by International Launch Services							
535-40	1 March 2010; 21:19:44	Proton-M/DM-2 8K82KM/11S861	Site 81/24	Kosmos 2459 (Uragan-M #731); Kosmos 2460 (Uragan-M #732); Kosmos 2461 (Uragan-M #735)		Medium Earth		Success
535-40	Navigation							
935-14	20 March 2010; 18:26:57	Proton-M/Briz-M 8K82KM/11S43	Site 200/39	EchoStar XIV		Geosynchronous transfer		Success
935-14	Communications							
935-11	24 April 2010; 11:19:00	Proton-M/Briz-M 8K82KM/11S43	Site 200/39	SES-1		Geosynchronous transfer		Success
935-11	Commercial launch conducted by International Launch Services, Communications							
935-12	3 June 2010; 22:00:08	Proton-M/Briz-M 8K82KM/11S43	Site 200/39	Badr-5		Geosynchronous transfer		Success
935-12	Commercial launch conducted by International Launch Services, Communications							
935-15	10 July 2010; 18:40:36	Proton-M/Briz-M 8K82KM/11S43	Site 200/39	EchoStar XV		Geosynchronous transfer		Success
935-15	Commercial launch conducted by International Launch Services, Communications							
535-30	2 September 2010; 00:53:50	Proton-M/DM-2 8K82KM/11S861	Site 81/24	Kosmos 2464 (Uragan-M #736); Kosmos 2465 (Uragan-M #737); Kosmos 2466 (Uragan-M #738)		Medium Earth		Success
535-30	Navigation							
935-16	14 October 2010; 18:53:21	Proton-M/Briz-M 8K82KM/11S43	Site 81/24	XM-5		Geosynchronous transfer		Success
935-16	Commercial launch conducted by International Launch Services, Communications							
935-13	14 November 2010; 17:29:20	Proton-M/Briz-M 8K82KM/11S43	Site 200/39	SkyTerra-1		Geosynchronous transfer		Success
935-13	Commercial launch conducted by International Launch Services, Communications							
535-37	5 December 2010; 10:25:19	Proton-M/DM-03 8K82KM/11S861-03	Site 81/24	Uragan-M #739, 740, 741		Medium Earth (intended)		Failure
535-37	First flight of the Blok-DM-03 upper stage. The upper stage and payloads failed to reach orbital velocity due to overloading of the upper stage with 1.5 tonnes of liquid oxygen, which was caused by communication error between engineers.							
935-17	26 December 2010; 21:51:00	Proton-M/Briz-M 8K82KM/11S43	Site 200/39	KA-SAT		Geosynchronous transfer		Success
935-17	Commercial launch conducted by International Launch Services, Communications							
=== 2011 ===
Flight No.	Date / time (UTC)	Rocket, Configuration	Launch site	Payload	Payload mass	Orbit	Users	Launch outcome
935-19	20 May 2011; 19:15:19	Proton-M/Briz-M 8K82KM/11S43	Site 200/39	Telstar-14R (Estrela do Sul 2)		Geosynchronous transfer		Success
935-19	Communications. Commercial launch conducted by International Launch Services							
935-18	15 July 2011; 23:16:10	Proton-M/Briz-M 8K82KM/11S43	Site 200/39	SES-3; KazSat-2		Geosynchronous		Success
935-18	Communication, Commercial launch conducted by International Launch Services (for SES-3)							
935-21	17 August 2011; 21:25:01	Proton-M/Briz-M 8K82KM/11S43	Site 200/39	Ekspress AM4		Geosynchronous transfer (intended)		Failure
935-21	Communications. Briz-M upper stage suffered a failure of attitude control due to a too short programmed time interval for gyro platform manipulation while the operation timeline was being formalized.							
535-42	20 September 2011; 22:46:00	Proton-M/Briz-M 8K82KM/11S43	Site 81/24	Kosmos 2473 (Garpun #1)		Geosynchronous		Success
535-42	Communications							
935-22	29 September 2011; 18:32:00	Proton-M/Briz-M 8K82KM/11S43	Site 200/39	QuetzSat-1		Geosynchronous transfer		Success
935-22	Communications, Commercial launch conducted by International Launch Services							
935-20	19 October 2011; 18:48:57	Proton-M/Briz-M 8K82KM/11S43	Site 200/39	ViaSat-1		Geosynchronous transfer		Success
935-20	Communications, Commercial launch conducted by International Launch Services							
535-39	4 November 2011; 12:51:41	Proton-M/Briz-M 8K82KM/11S43	Site 81/24	Kosmos 2475 (Uragan-M #743); Kosmos 2476 (Uragan-M #744); Kosmos 2477 (Uragan-M #745)		Medium Earth		Success
535-39	Navigation							
935-25	25 November 2011; 19:10:34	Proton-M/Briz-M 8K82KM/11S43	Site 200/39	AsiaSat 7		Geosynchronous transfer		Success
935-25	Communications, Commercial launch conducted by International Launch Services							
935-23	11 December 2011; 11:17:00	Proton-M/Briz-M 8K82KM/11S43	Site 81/24	Luch-5A; Amos-5		Geosynchronous		Success
935-23	Communication / Data Relay							
=== 2012 ===
Flight No.	Date / time (UTC)	Rocket, Configuration	Launch site	Payload	Payload mass	Orbit	Users	Launch outcome
935-24	14 February 2012; 19:36:37	Proton-M/Briz-M 8K82KM/11S43	Site 200/39	SES-4		Geosynchronous transfer		Success
935-24	Communications, Commercial launch conducted by International Launch Services							
935-28	25 March 2012; 12:10:32	Proton-M/Briz-M 8K82KM/11S43	Site 200/39	Intelsat 22		Super-synchronous transfer		Success
935-28	Communications, Commercial launch conducted by International Launch Services							
410-18	30 March 2012; 05:49:32	Proton-K/Blok-DM-2 8K82K/11S861	Site 81/24	Kosmos 2479 (US-KMO)		Geosynchronous		Success
410-18	Final flight of the Proton-K. Missile warning							
935-27	23 April 2012; 22:18:13	Proton-M/Briz-M 8K82KM/11S43	Site 200/39	Yahsat 1B		Geosynchronous transfer orbit		Success
935-27	Communications, Commercial launch conducted by International Launch Services							
935-29	17 May 2012; 19:12:14	Proton-M/Briz-M 8K82KM/11S43	Site 81/24	Nimiq 6		Geosynchronous transfer orbit		Success
935-29	Communications, Commercial launch conducted by International Launch Services							
935-30	9 July 2012; 18:38:30	Proton-M/Briz-M 8K82KM/11S43	Site 81/24	SES-5		Geosynchronous transfer orbit		Success
935-30	Communications, Commercial launch conducted by International Launch Services							
935-31	6 August 2012; 19:31:00	Proton-M/Briz-M 8K82KM/11S43	Site 81/24	Telkom 3 Ekspress MD2		Geosynchronous (intended)		Failure
935-31	Communication, Briz-M upper stage failure 7 seconds into its third burn.							
935-26	14 October 2012; 08:37:00	Proton-M/Briz-M 8K82KM/11S43	Site 81/24	Intelsat 23		Geosynchronous		Success
935-26	Communication, Commercial launch conducted by International Launch Services							
935-32	2 November 2012; 21:04:00	Proton-M/Briz-M 8K82KM/11S43	Site 81/24	Luch-5B; Yamal-300K		Geosynchronous		Success
935-32	Communication / Data Relay							
935-33	20 November 2012; 18:31:00	Proton-M/Briz-M 8K82KM/11S43	Site 200/39	EchoStar XVI		Geosynchronous transfer		Success
935-33	Communications, Commercial launch conducted by International Launch Services							
935-34	8 December 2012; 13:13:43	Proton-M/Briz-M 8K82KM/11S43	Site 200/39	Yamal-402		Geosynchronous transfer (intended) (achieved)		Partial failure
935-34	Communications, Commercial launch conducted by International Launch Services. Briz-M upper stage shut down 4 minutes earlier than planned on its fourth burn due to oxidizer turbopump bearing damaged. Satellite able to maneuver into its designated orbit by itself.							
=== 2013 ===
Flight No.	Date / time (UTC)	Rocket, Configuration	Launch site	Payload	Payload mass	Orbit	Users	Launch outcome
935-36	26 March 2013; 19:06:48	Proton-M/Briz-M 8K82KM/11S43	Site 200/39	Satmex 8		Geosynchronous transfer		Success
935-36	Communications, Commercial launch conducted by International Launch Services							
935-37	15 April 2013; 18:36:00	Proton-M/Briz-M 8K82KM/11S43	Site 200/39	Anik G1		Geosynchronous transfer		Success
935-37	Communications, Commercial launch conducted by International Launch Services							
935-38	14 May 2013; 16:02:00	Proton-M/Briz-M 8K82KM/11S43	Site 200/39	Eutelsat 3D		Geosynchronous transfer		Success
935-38	Communications, Commercial launch conducted by International Launch Services							
935-40	3 June 2013; 09:18:31	Proton-M/Briz-M 8K82KM/11S43	Site 200/39	SES-6		Super-synchronous transfer		Success
935-40	Communications, Commercial launch conducted by International Launch Services							
535-43	2 July 2013; 02:38:22	Proton-M/DM-03 8K82KM/11S861-03	Site 81/24	Uragan-M #748; Uragan-M #749; Uragan-M #750		Medium Earth (intended)		Failure
535-43	Navigation, First stage control failure, rocket crashed near launch pad. Accident caused by angular velocity sensors of the rocket's control system wrongly installed backwards.							
935-39	29 September 2013; 21:38:10	Proton-M/Briz-M 8K82KM/11S43	Site 200/39	Astra 2E		Geosynchronous transfer		Success
935-39	Communications, Commercial launch conducted by International Launch Services							
935-35	25 October 2013; 18:08:54	Proton-M/Briz-M 8K82KM/11S43	Site 200/39	Sirius FM-6		Geosynchronous transfer		Success
935-35	Communications, Commercial launch conducted by International Launch Services							
535-41	11 November 2013; 23:46:00	Proton-M/Briz-M 8K82KM/11S43	Site 81/24	Raduga 1M #3		Geosynchronous		Success
535-41	Communications							
935-44	8 December 2013; 12:12:00	Proton-M/Briz-M 8K82KM/11S43	Site 200/39	Inmarsat 5-F1		Super-synchronous transfer		Success
935-44	Communications, Commercial launch conducted by International Launch Services							
935-41	26 December 2013; 10:49:56	Proton-M/Briz-M 8K82KM/11S43	Site 81/24	Ekspress AM5		Geosynchronous transfer		Success
935-41	Communications							
=== 2014 ===
Flight No.	Date / time (UTC)	Rocket, Configuration	Launch site	Payload	Payload mass	Orbit	Users	Launch outcome
935-43	14 February 2014; 21:09:03	Proton-M/Briz-M 8K82KM/11S43	Site 81/24	Türksat 4A		Geosynchronous transfer		Success
935-43	Communications, Commercial launch conducted by International Launch Services							
935-42	15 March 2014; 23:08:00	Proton-M/Briz-M 8K82KM/11S43	Site 81/24	Ekspress AT1; Ekspress AT2		Geosynchronous		Success
935-42	Communications							
935-46	28 April 2014; 04:25:00	Proton-M/Briz-M 8K82KM/11S43	Site 81/24	Luch 5V; KazSat-3		Geosynchronous transfer		Success
935-46	Communication / Data Relay							
935-45	15 May 2014; 21:42:00	Proton-M/Briz-M 8K82KM/11S43	Site 200/39	Ekspress AM4R		Geosynchronous transfer (intended)		Failure
935-45	Communications, Proton third stage vernier engine failure at T+542 seconds due to failure of the turbopump structural support causing damage to the oxidizer inlet line.							
935-47	27 September 2014; 20:23:00	Proton-M/Briz-M 8K82KM/11S43	Site 81/24	Luch (Olimp-K)		Geosynchronous		Success
935-47	Communications							
935-48	21 October 2014; 15:09:32	Proton-M/Briz-M 8K82KM/11S43	Site 81/24	Ekspress AM6		Geosynchronous		Partial failure
935-48	Communications, The Briz-M upper stage shut down prematurely on its final burn that caused the satellite reaching the slightly lower perigee than planned (31,307 km instead of the planned 33,799 km). The satellite was able to manoeuvre itself into the planned operational geosynchronous orbit, with small loss of onboard propellant.							
935-50	15 December 2014; 00:16:00	Proton-M/Briz-M 8K82KM/11S43	Site 81/24	Yamal-401		Geosynchronous		Success
935-50	Communications, Commercial launch conducted by International Launch Services							
935-49	27 December 2014; 21:37:49	Proton-M/Briz-M 8K82KM/11S43	Site 200/39	Astra 2G		Geosynchronous transfer		Success
935-49	Communications, Commercial launch conducted by International Launch Services							
=== 2015 ===
Flight No.	Date / time (UTC)	Rocket, Configuration	Launch site	Payload	Payload mass	Orbit	Users	Launch outcome
935-51	1 February 2015; 12:31:00	Proton-M/Briz-M 8K82KM/11S43	Site 200/39	Inmarsat 5-F2		Super-synchronous transfer		Success
935-51	Communications, Commercial launch conducted by International Launch Services							
935-52	18 March 2015; 22:05:00	Proton-M/Briz-M 8K82KM/11S43	Site 200/39	Ekspress AM7		Geosynchronous transfer		Success
935-52	Communications							
935-54	16 May 2015; 05:47:39	Proton-M/Briz-M 8K82KM/11S43	Site 200/39	Mexsat-1		Geosynchronous transfer (intended)		Failure
935-54	Communications, Commercial launch conducted by International Launch Services Proton third stage vernier engine failed at T+497 seconds due to excess vibration caused by inability to cope with uneven supply from a pump which had suffered shaft coating degradation.							
935-55	28 August 2015; 11:44:00	Proton-M/Briz-M 8K82KM/11S43	Site 200/39	Inmarsat 5-F3		Super-synchronous transfer	Inmarsat	Success
935-55	Communications, Commercial launch conducted by International Launch Services							
935-53	14 September 2015; 19:00:00	Proton-M/DM-03 8K82KM/11S861-03	Site 81/24	Ekspress AM8		Geosynchronous		Success
935-53	Communications							
935-56	16 October 2015; 20:40:11	Proton-M/Briz-M 8K82KM/11S43	Site 200/39	Türksat 4B		Geosynchronous transfer		Success
935-56	Communications, Commercial launch conducted by International Launch Services							
535-44	13 December 2015; 00:19:00	Proton-M/Briz-M 8K82KM/11S43	Site 81/24	Kosmos 2513 (Garpun #2)		Geosynchronous		Success
535-44	Communications							
935-57	24 December 2015; 21:31:19	Proton-M/Briz-M 8K82KM/11S43	Site 200/39	Ekspress AMU1		Geosynchronous transfer		Success
935-57	Communications							
=== 2016 ===
Flight No.	Date / time (UTC)	Rocket, Configuration	Launch site	Payload	Payload mass	Orbit	Users	Launch outcome
935-58	29 January 2016; 22:20:09	Proton-M/Briz-M 8K82KM/11S43	Site 200/39	Eutelsat 9B		Geosynchronous transfer		Success
935-58	Communications, Commercial launch conducted by International Launch Services							
935-60	14 March 2016; 09:31:42	Proton-M/Briz-M 8K82KM/11S43	Site 200/39	ExoMars Trace Gas Orbiter; Schiaparelli EDM lander		Heliocentric	ESA	Success
935-60	Mars orbiter/Mars lander, Briz-M upper stage reportedly exploded after separation, but that was later denied by Roscosmos.							
937-01	9 June 2016; 07:10:00	Proton-M/Briz-M 8K82KM/11S43	Site 81/24	Intelsat 31		Super-synchronous transfer		Success
937-01	Communications, Commercial launch conducted by International Launch Services. Second stage under-performed but shortfall fully compensated by the upper stage.							
=== 2017 ===
Flight No.	Date / time (UTC)	Rocket, Configuration	Launch site	Payload	Payload mass	Orbit	Users	Launch outcome
935-61	8 June 2017; 03:45:47	Proton-M/Briz-M 8K82KM/11S43	Site 81/24	EchoStar 21		Geosynchronous transfer	EchoStar	Success
935-61	Communications, Commercial launch conducted by International Launch Services.							
935-59	16 August 2017; 22:07:00	Proton-M/Briz-M 8K82KM/11S43	Site 81/24	Kosmos 2520 (Blagovest 11L)		Geosynchronous	VKS	Success
935-59	Communications							
935-65	11 September 2017; 19:23:41	Proton-M/Briz-M 8K82KM/11S43	Site 200/39	Amazonas 5		Geosynchronous transfer	Hispasat	Success
935-65	Communications, Commercial launch conducted by International Launch Services.							
937-02	28 September 2017; 18:52:16	Proton-M/Briz-M 8K82KM/11S43	Site 200/39	AsiaSat 9		Geosynchronous transfer	AsiaSat	Success
937-02	Communications, Commercial launch conducted by International Launch Services.							
=== 2018 ===
Flight No.	Date / time (UTC)	Rocket, Configuration	Launch site	Payload	Payload mass	Orbit	Users	Launch outcome
935-62	18 April 2018; 22:12:00	Proton-M/Briz-M 8K82KM/11S43	Site 81/24	Kosmos 2526 (Blagovest 12L)		Geosynchronous	VKS	Success
935-62	Communications							
935-63	21 December 2018; 00:20:00	Proton-M/Briz-M 8K82KM/11S43	Site 81/24	Kosmos 2533 (Blagovest 13L)		Geosynchronous	VKS	Success
935-63	Communications							
=== 2019 ===
Flight No.	Date / time (UTC)	Rocket, Configuration	Launch site	Payload	Payload mass	Orbit	Users	Launch outcome
935-69	30 May 2019; 17:42:00	Proton-M/Briz-M 8K82KM/11S43	Site 200/39	Yamal-601		Geosynchronous transfer	Gazprom Space Systems	Success
935-69	Communications, Commercial launch conducted by International Launch Services.							
535-47	13 July 2019; 12:30:57	Proton-M/DM-03 8K82KM/11S861-03	Site 81/24	Spektr-RG		Sun–Earth L_{2}	Russian Space Research Institute & German Aerospace Center	Success
535-47	High-energy astrophysics & X-ray astronomy observatory							
935-64	5 August 2019; 21:56:00	Proton-M/Briz-M 8K82KM/11S43	Site 81/24	Kosmos 2539 Blagovest-14L		Geosynchronous	VKS	Success
935-64	Military communications; fourth Blagovest satellite launch, completing the initial Blagovest satellite constellation.							
937-04	9 October 2019; 10:17:56	Proton-M/Briz-M 8K82KM/11S43	Site 200/39	Eutelsat 5 West B / MEV-1		Geosynchronous	Eutelsat / Northrop Grumman Innovation Systems	Success
937-04	Communications satellite and a satellite servicing mission. Commercial launch conducted by International Launch Services.							
935-66	24 December 2019; 12:03:02	Proton-M/DM-03 8K82KM/11S861-03	Site 81/24	Elektro-L No. 3		Geosynchronous	Roscosmos	Success
935-66	Meteorology satellite							
