= List of Kosmos satellites (2251–2500) =

The designation Kosmos (Russian: Космос meaning Cosmos) is a generic name given to a large number of Soviet, and subsequently Russian, satellites, the first of which was launched in 1962. Satellites given Kosmos designations include military spacecraft, failed probes to the Moon and the planets, prototypes for crewed spacecraft, and scientific spacecraft. This is a list of satellites with Kosmos designations between 2251 and 2500.

| Designation | Type | Launch date (GMT) | Carrier rocket | Function | Decay/Destruction* | Remarks |
|---|---|---|---|---|---|---|
| Kosmos 2251 | Strela-2 | 16 June 1993; 04:17 | Kosmos-3M 11K65M | Communication | 10 February 2009* | Collided with Iridium 33 |
| Kosmos 2252 | Strela-3 | 24 June 1993; 04:12 | Tsyklon-3 11K68 | Communication | in orbit | |
| Kosmos 2253 | Strela-3 | 24 June 1993; 04:12 | Tsyklon-3 11K68 | Communication | in orbit | |
| Kosmos 2254 | Strela-3 | 24 June 1993; 04:12 | Tsyklon-3 11K68 | Communication | in orbit | |
| Kosmos 2255 | Strela-3 | 24 June 1993; 04:12 | Tsyklon-3 11K68 | Communication | in orbit | |
| Kosmos 2256 | Strela-3 | 24 June 1993; 04:12 | Tsyklon-3 11K68 | Communication | in orbit | |
| Kosmos 2257 | Strela-3 | 24 June 1993; 04:12 | Tsyklon-3 11K68 | Communication | in orbit | |
| Kosmos 2258 | US-PU | 7 July 1993; 07:15 | Tsyklon-2 11K69 | Reconnaissance | 8 June 1995 | |
| Kosmos 2259 | Yantar-4K2 | 14 July 1993; 16:40 | Soyuz-U 11A511U | Reconnaissance | 25 July 1993 | |
| Kosmos 2260 | Resurs-T | 22 July 1993; 08:45 | Soyuz-U 11A511U | Remote sensing | 5 August 1993 | |
| Kosmos 2261 | US-K | 10 August 1993; 14:53 | Molniya-M/2BL 8K78M | Early warning | 31 December 2012 | |
| Kosmos 2262 | Orlets-1 | 7 September 1993; 13:25 | Soyuz-U2 11A511U2 | Reconnaissance | 18 December 1993 | |
| Kosmos 2263 | Tselina-2 | 16 September 1993; 07:36 | Zenit-2 11K77 | ELINT | in orbit | |
| Kosmos 2264 | US-PU | 17 September 1993; 00:43 | Tsyklon-2 11K69 | Reconnaissance | 7 August 1995 | |
| Kosmos 2265 | Taifun-1B | 26 October 1993; 10:00 | Kosmos-3M 11K65M | Radar target | 11 August 2003 | |
| Kosmos 2266 | Parus | 2 November 1993; 12:10 | Kosmos-3M 11K65M | Navigation, Communication | in orbit | |
| Kosmos 2267 | Yantar-4KS1M | 5 November 1993; 08:25 | Soyuz-U 11A511U | Reconnaissance | 28 December 1994 | |
| Kosmos 2268 | Strela-3 | 12 February 1994; 08:54 | Tsyklon-3 11K68 | Communication | in orbit | |
| Kosmos 2269 | Strela-3 | 12 February 1994; 08:54 | Tsyklon-3 11K68 | Communication | in orbit | |
| Kosmos 2270 | Strela-3 | 12 February 1994; 08:54 | Tsyklon-3 11K68 | Communication | in orbit | |
| Kosmos 2271 | Strela-3 | 12 February 1994; 08:54 | Tsyklon-3 11K68 | Communication | in orbit | |
| Kosmos 2272 | Strela-3 | 12 February 1994; 08:54 | Tsyklon-3 11K68 | Communication | in orbit | |
| Kosmos 2273 | Strela-3 | 12 February 1994; 08:54 | Tsyklon-3 11K68 | Communication | in orbit | |
| Kosmos 2274 | Yantar-4K2 | 17 March 1994; 16:30 | Soyuz-U 11A511U | Reconnaissance | 21 May 1994 | |
| Kosmos 2275 | Glonass | 11 April 1994; 07:49 | Proton-K/DM-2 8K72K | Navigation | in orbit | |
| Kosmos 2276 | Glonass | 11 April 1994; 07:49 | Proton-K/DM-2 8K72K | Navigation | in orbit | |
| Kosmos 2277 | Glonass | 11 April 1994; 07:49 | Proton-K/DM-2 8K72K | Navigation | in orbit | |
| Kosmos 2278 | Tselina-2 | 23 April 1994; 08:01 | Zenit-2 11K77 | ELINT | in orbit | |
| Kosmos 2279 | Parus | 26 April 1994; 02:14 | Kosmos-3M 11K65M | Navigation, Communication | in orbit | |
| Kosmos 2280 | Yantar-4KS1M | 28 April 1994; 17:14 | Soyuz-U 11A511U | Reconnaissance | 10 March 1995 | |
| Kosmos 2281 | Zenit-8 | 7 June 1994; 07:20 | Soyuz-U 11A511U | Reconnaissance | 29 June 1994 | |
| Kosmos 2282 | US-KMO | 6 July 1994; 23:58 | Proton-K/DM-2 8K72K | Early warning | in orbit | |
| Kosmos 2283 | Yantar-4K2 | 20 July 1994; 17:35 | Soyuz-U 11A511U | Reconnaissance | 29 September 1994 | |
| Kosmos 2284 | Yantar-1KFT | 29 July 1994; 09:30 | Soyuz-U 11A511U | Reconnaissance | 11 September 1994 | |
| Kosmos 2285 | Obzor | 2 August 1994; 20:00 | Kosmos-3M 11K65M | | in orbit | |
| Kosmos 2286 | US-K | 5 August 1994; 01:12 | Molniya-M/2BL 8K78M | Early warning | in orbit | |
| Kosmos 2287 | Glonass | 11 August 1994; 15:27 | Proton-K/DM-2 8K72K | Navigation | in orbit | |
| Kosmos 2288 | Glonass | 11 August 1994; 15:27 | Proton-K/DM-2 8K72K | Navigation | in orbit | |
| Kosmos 2289 | Glonass | 11 August 1994; 15:27 | Proton-K/DM-2 8K72K | Navigation | in orbit | |
| Kosmos 2290 | Orlets-2 | 26 August 1994; 12:00 | Zenit-2 11K77 | Reconnaissance | 4 April 1995 | |
| Kosmos 2291 | Potok | 21 September 1994; 17:53 | Proton-K/DM-2 8K72K | Communication | in orbit | |
| Kosmos 2292 | Taifun-1 | 27 September 1994; 14:00 | Kosmos-3M 11K65M | Radar target | in orbit | |
| Kosmos 2293 | US-PU | 2 November 1994; 01:04 | Tsyklon-2 11K69 | Reconnaissance | 13 May 1996 | |
| Kosmos 2294 | Glonass | 20 November 1994; 00:39 | Proton-K/DM-2 8K72K | Navigation | in orbit | |
| Kosmos 2295 | Glonass | 20 November 1994; 00:39 | Proton-K/DM-2 8K72K | Navigation | in orbit | |
| Kosmos 2296 | Glonass | 20 November 1994; 00:39 | Proton-K/DM-2 8K72K | Navigation | in orbit | |
| Kosmos 2297 | Tselina-2 | 24 November 1994; 09:15 | Zenit-2 11K77 | ELINT | in orbit | |
| Kosmos 2298 | Strela-2 | 20 December 1994; 05:11 | Kosmos-3M 11K65M | Communication | in orbit | |
| Kosmos 2299 | Strela-3 | 26 December 1994; 22:26 | Tsyklon-3 11K68 | Communication | in orbit | |
| Kosmos 2300 | Strela-3 | 26 December 1994; 22:26 | Tsyklon-3 11K68 | Communication | in orbit | |
| Kosmos 2301 | Strela-3 | 26 December 1994; 22:26 | Tsyklon-3 11K68 | Communication | in orbit | |
| Kosmos 2302 | Strela-3 | 26 December 1994; 22:26 | Tsyklon-3 11K68 | Communication | in orbit | |
| Kosmos 2303 | Strela-3 | 26 December 1994; 22:26 | Tsyklon-3 11K68 | Communication | in orbit | |
| Kosmos 2304 | Strela-3 | 26 December 1994; 22:26 | Tsyklon-3 11K68 | Communication | in orbit | |
| Kosmos 2305 | Yantar-4KS1M | 29 December 1994; 11:30 | Soyuz-U 11A511U | Reconnaissance | 18 December 1995 | |
| Kosmos 2306 | Romb | 2 March 1995; 13:00 | Kosmos-3M 11K65M | Calibration | 30 October 2000 | |
| Kosmos 2307 | Glonass | 7 March 1995; 09:23 | Proton-K/DM-2 8K72K | Navigation | in orbit | |
| Kosmos 2308 | Glonass | 7 March 1995; 09:23 | Proton-K/DM-2 8K72K | Navigation | in orbit | |
| Kosmos 2309 | Glonass | 7 March 1995; 09:23 | Proton-K/DM-2 8K72K | Navigation | in orbit | |
| Kosmos 2310 | Parus | 22 March 1995; 04:09 | Kosmos-3M 11K65M | Navigation, Communication | in orbit | |
| Kosmos 2311 | Yantar-4K2 | 22 March 1995; 16:44 | Soyuz-U 11A511U | Reconnaissance | 31 May 1995 | |
| Kosmos 2312 | US-K | 24 May 1995; 20:10 | Molniya-M/2BL 8K78M | Early warning | in orbit | |
| Kosmos 2313 | US-PU | 8 June 1995; 04:43 | Tsyklon-2 11K69 | Reconnaissance | 11 July 1997 | |
| Kosmos 2314 | Yantar-4K2 | 28 June 1995; 18:25 | Soyuz-U 11A511U | Reconnaissance | 6 September 1995 | |
| Kosmos 2315 | Nadezhda | 5 July 1995; 03:09 | Kosmos-3M 11K65M | Navigation, Technology | in orbit | |
| Kosmos 2316 | Glonass | 24 July 1995; 15:52 | Proton-K/DM-2 8K72K | Navigation | in orbit | |
| Kosmos 2317 | Glonass | 24 July 1995; 15:52 | Proton-K/DM-2 8K72K | Navigation | in orbit | |
| Kosmos 2318 | Glonass | 24 July 1995; 15:52 | Proton-K/DM-2 8K72K | Navigation | in orbit | |
| Kosmos 2319 | Potok | 30 August 1995; 19:33 | Proton-K/DM-2 8K72K | Communication | in orbit | |
| Kosmos 2320 | Yantar-4KS1M | 29 September 1995; 04:25 | Soyuz-U 11A511U | Reconnaissance | 28 September 1996 | |
| Kosmos 2321 | Parus | 6 October 1995; 03:23 | Kosmos-3M 11K65M | Navigation, Communication | 21 August 1997 | |
| Kosmos 2322 | Tselina-2 | 31 October 1995; 20:19 | Zenit-2 11K77 | ELINT | in orbit | |
| Kosmos 2323 | Glonass | 14 December 1995; 06:10 | Proton-K/DM-2 8K72K | Navigation | in orbit | |
| Kosmos 2324 | Glonass | 14 December 1995; 06:10 | Proton-K/DM-2 8K72K | Navigation | in orbit | |
| Kosmos 2325 | Glonass | 14 December 1995; 06:10 | Proton-K/DM-2 8K72K | Navigation | in orbit | |
| Kosmos 2326 | US-PU | 20 December 1995; 00:52 | Tsyklon-2 11K69 | Reconnaissance | 8 November 1997 | |
| Kosmos 2327 | Parus | 16 January 1996; 15:33 | Kosmos-3M 11K65M | Navigation, Communication | in orbit | |
| Kosmos 2328 | Strela-3 | 19 February 1996; 00:58 | Tsyklon-3 11K68 | Communication | in orbit | Launched with three Gonets satellites |
| Kosmos 2329 | Strela-3 | 19 February 1996; 00:58 | Tsyklon-3 11K68 | Communication | in orbit | Launched with three Gonets satellites |
| Kosmos 2330 | Strela-3 | 19 February 1996; 00:58 | Tsyklon-3 11K68 | Communication | in orbit | Launched with three Gonets satellites |
| Kosmos 2331 | Yantar-4K2 | 14 March 1996; 17:40 | Soyuz-U 11A511U | Reconnaissance | 11 June 1996 | |
| Kosmos 2332 | Taifun-1B | 24 April 1996; 13:00 | Kosmos-3M 11K65M | Radar target | 28 January 2005 | |
| Kosmos 2333 | Tselina-2 | 4 September 1996; 09:01 | Zenit-2 11K77 | ELINT | in orbit | A piece of 2333's launch vehicle collided with China's Yunhai 1-02 meteorological spacecraft in March 2021. |
| Kosmos 2334 | Parus | 5 September 1996; 12:47 | Kosmos-3M 11K65M | Navigation, Communication | in orbit | |
| Kosmos 2335 | US-PU | 11 December 1996; 12:00 | Tsyklon-2 11K69 | Reconnaissance | 1 January 1999 | |
| Kosmos 2336 | Parus | 20 December 1996; 06:43 | Kosmos-3M 11K65M | Navigation, Communication | in orbit | |
| Kosmos 2337 | Strela-3 | 14 February 1997; 03:47 | Tsyklon-3 11K68 | Communication | in orbit | Launched with three Gonets satellites |
| Kosmos 2338 | Strela-3 | 14 February 1997; 03:47 | Tsyklon-3 11K68 | Communication | in orbit | Launched with three Gonets satellites |
| Kosmos 2339 | Strela-3 | 14 February 1997; 03:47 | Tsyklon-3 11K68 | Communication | in orbit | Launched with three Gonets satellites |
| Kosmos 2340 | US-K | 9 April 1997; 08:58 | Molniya-M/2BL 8K78M | Early warning | in orbit | |
| Kosmos 2341 | Parus | 17 April 1997; 13:03 | Kosmos-3M 11K65M | Navigation, Communication | in orbit | |
| Kosmos 2342 | US-K | 14 May 1997; 00:33 | Molniya-M/2BL 8K78M | Early warning | in orbit | |
| Kosmos 2343 | Orlets-1 | 15 May 1997; 12:10 | Soyuz-U 11A511U | Reconnaissance | 18 September 1997 | |
| Kosmos 2344 | Arkon-1 | 6 June 1997; 16:56 | Proton-K/DM-5 8K72K | Reconnaissance | in orbit | |
| Kosmos 2345 | US-KS | 14 August 1997; 20:49 | Proton-K/DM-2 8K72K | Early warning | in orbit | Final US-KS satellite |
| Kosmos 2346 | Parus | 23 September 1997; 16:44 | Kosmos-3M 11K65M | Navigation, Communication | in orbit | |
| Kosmos 2347 | US-PU | 9 December 1997; 07:17 | Tsyklon-2 11K69 | Reconnaissance | 11 December 1999 | |
| Kosmos 2348 | Yantar-4K2 | 15 December 1997; 15:40 | Soyuz-U 11A511U | Reconnaissance | 14 April 1998 | |
| Kosmos 2349 | Yantar-1KFT | 17 February 1998; 10:35 | Soyuz-U 11A511U | Reconnaissance | 2 April 1998 | |
| Kosmos 2350 | US-KMO | 29 April 1998; 04:36 | Proton-K/DM-2 8K72K | Early warning | in orbit | |
| Kosmos 2351 | US-K | 7 May 1998; 08:53 | Molniya-M/2BL 8K78M | Early warning | in orbit | |
| Kosmos 2352 | Strela-3 | 15 June 1998; 22:58 | Tsyklon-3 11K68 | Communication | in orbit | |
| Kosmos 2353 | Strela-3 | 15 June 1998; 22:58 | Tsyklon-3 11K68 | Communication | in orbit | |
| Kosmos 2354 | Strela-3 | 15 June 1998; 22:58 | Tsyklon-3 11K68 | Communication | in orbit | |
| Kosmos 2355 | Strela-3 | 15 June 1998; 22:58 | Tsyklon-3 11K68 | Communication | in orbit | |
| Kosmos 2356 | Strela-3 | 15 June 1998; 22:58 | Tsyklon-3 11K68 | Communication | in orbit | |
| Kosmos 2357 | Strela-3 | 15 June 1998; 22:58 | Tsyklon-3 11K68 | Communication | in orbit | |
| Kosmos 2358 | Yantar-4K2 | 24 June 1998; 18:29 | Soyuz-U 11A511U | Reconnaissance | 22 October 1998 | |
| Kosmos 2359 | Yantar-4KS1M | 25 June 1998; 14:00 | Soyuz-U 11A511U | Reconnaissance | 12 July 1999 | |
| Kosmos 2360 | Tselina-2 | 28 July 1998; 09:15 | Zenit-2 11K77 | ELINT | in orbit | |
| Kosmos 2361 | Parus | 24 December 1998; 20:02 | Kosmos-3M 11K65M | Navigation, Communication | in orbit | |
| Kosmos 2362 | Glonass | 30 December 1998; 18:35 | Proton-K/DM-2 8K72K | Navigation | in orbit | |
| Kosmos 2363 | Glonass | 30 December 1998; 18:35 | Proton-K/DM-2 8K72K | Navigation | in orbit | |
| Kosmos 2364 | Glonass | 30 December 1998; 18:35 | Proton-K/DM-2 8K72K | Navigation | in orbit | |
| Kosmos 2365 | Yantar-4K2 | 18 August 1999; 18:00 | Soyuz-U 11A511U | Reconnaissance | 15 December 1999 | |
| Kosmos 2366 | Parus | 26 August 1999; 12:02 | Kosmos-3M 11K65M | Navigation, Communication | in orbit | |
| Kosmos 2367 | US-PU | 26 December 1999; 08:00 | Tsyklon-2 11K69 | Reconnaissance | 20 July 2002 | |
| Kosmos 2368 | US-K | 27 December 1999; 19:12 | Molniya-M/2BL 8K78M | Early warning | in orbit | |
| Kosmos 2369 | Tselina-2 | 3 February 2000; 09:26 | Zenit-2 11K77 | ELINT | in orbit | |
| Kosmos 2370 | Yantar-4KS1M | 3 May 2000; 13:25 | Soyuz-U 11A511U | Reconnaissance | 3 May 2001 | |
| Kosmos 2371 | Potok | 4 July 2000; 23:44 | Proton-K/DM-2 8K72K | Communication | in orbit | |
| Kosmos 2372 | Orlets-2 | 25 September 2000; 10:10 | Zenit-2 11K77 | Reconnaissance | 20 April 2001 | |
| Kosmos 2373 | Yantar-1KFT | 29 September 2000; 09:30 | Soyuz-U 11A511U | Reconnaissance | 14 November 2000 | |
| Kosmos 2374 | Glonass | 13 October 2000; 14:12 | Proton-K/DM-2 8K72K | Navigation | in orbit | |
| Kosmos 2375 | Glonass | 13 October 2000; 14:12 | Proton-K/DM-2 8K72K | Navigation | in orbit | |
| Kosmos 2376 | Glonass | 13 October 2000; 14:12 | Proton-K/DM-2 8K72K | Navigation | in orbit | |
| Kosmos 2377 | Yantar-4K2 | 29 May 2001; 17:55 | Soyuz-U 11A511U | Reconnaissance | 10 October 2001 | |
| Kosmos 2378 | Parus | 8 June 2001; 15:08 | Kosmos-3M 11K65M | Navigation, Communication | in orbit | |
| Kosmos 2379 | US-K | 24 August 2001; 20:35 | Proton-K/DM-2 8K72K | Early warning | in orbit | |
| Kosmos 2380 | Glonass | 1 December 2001; 18:04 | Proton-K/DM-2 8K72K | Navigation | in orbit | |
| Kosmos 2381 | Glonass | 1 December 2001; 18:04 | Proton-K/DM-2 8K72K | Navigation | in orbit | |
| Kosmos 2382 | Glonass-M | 1 December 2001; 18:04 | Proton-K/DM-2 8K72K | Navigation | in orbit | |
| Kosmos 2383 | US-PU | 21 December 2001; 04:00 | Tsyklon-2 11K69 | Reconnaissance | 20 March 2004 | |
| Kosmos 2384 | Strela-3 | 28 December 2001; 03:24 | Tsyklon-3 11K68 | Communication | in orbit | Launched with three Gonets satellites |
| Kosmos 2385 | Strela-3 | 28 December 2001; 03:24 | Tsyklon-3 11K68 | Communication | in orbit | Launched with three Gonets satellites |
| Kosmos 2386 | Strela-3 | 28 December 2001; 03:24 | Tsyklon-3 11K68 | Communication | in orbit | Launched with three Gonets satellites |
| Kosmos 2387 | Yantar-4K2 | 25 February 2002; 17:26 | Soyuz-U 11A511U | Reconnaissance | 27 June 2002 | |
| Kosmos 2388 | US-K | 1 April 2002; 22:06 | Molniya-M/2BL 8K78M | Early warning | 14 September 2011 | |
| Kosmos 2389 | Parus | 28 May 2002; 18:14 | Kosmos-3M 11K65M | Navigation, Communication | in orbit | |
| Kosmos 2390 | Strela-3 | 8 July 2002; 06:35 | Kosmos-3M 11K65M | Communication | in orbit | |
| Kosmos 2391 | Strela-3 | 8 July 2002; 06:35 | Kosmos-3M 11K65M | Communication | in orbit | |
| Kosmos 2392 | Arkon-1 | 25 July 2002; 15:13 | Proton-K/DM-5 8K72K | Reconnaissance | in orbit | |
| Kosmos 2393 | US-K | 24 December 2002; 12:20 | Molniya-M/2BL 8K78M | Early warning | 22 December 2013 | |
| Kosmos 2394 | Glonass | 25 December 2002; 07:37 | Proton-K/DM-2M 8K72K | Navigation | in orbit | |
| Kosmos 2395 | Glonass | 25 December 2002; 07:37 | Proton-K/DM-2M 8K72K | Navigation | in orbit | |
| Kosmos 2396 | Glonass | 25 December 2002; 07:37 | Proton-K/DM-2M 8K72K | Navigation | in orbit | |
| Kosmos 2397 | US-KMO | 24 April 2003; 04:23 | Proton-K/DM-2 8K72K | Early warning | in orbit | |
| Kosmos 2398 | Parus | 4 June 2003; 19:23 | Kosmos-3M 11K65M | Navigation, Communication | in orbit | |
| Kosmos 2399 | Orlets-1 | 12 August 2003; 14:20 | Soyuz-U 11A511U | Reconnaissance | 9 December 2003 | |
| Kosmos 2400 | Strela-3 | 19 August 2003; 10:50 | Kosmos-3M 11K65M | Communication | in orbit | |
| Kosmos 2401 | Strela-3 | 19 August 2003; 10:50 | Kosmos-3M 11K65M | Communication | in orbit | |
| Kosmos 2402 | Glonass | 10 December 2003; 17:42 | Proton-K/Briz-M 8K72K | Navigation | in orbit | |
| Kosmos 2403 | Glonass | 10 December 2003; 17:42 | Proton-K/Briz-M 8K72K | Navigation | in orbit | |
| Kosmos 2404 | Glonass-M | 10 December 2003; 17:42 | Proton-K/Briz-M 8K72K | Navigation | in orbit | |
| Kosmos 2405 | US-PU | 28 May 2004; 06:00 | Tsyklon-2 11K69 | Reconnaissance | 16 June 2006 | |
| Kosmos 2406 | Tselina-2 | 10 June 2004; 01:28 | Zenit-2 11K77 | ELINT | in orbit | |
| Kosmos 2407 | Parus | 22 July 2004; 17:46 | Kosmos-3M 11K65M | Navigation, Communication | in orbit | |
| Kosmos 2408 | Strela-3 | 23 September 2004; 15:07 | Kosmos-3M 11K65M | Communication | in orbit | |
| Kosmos 2409 | Strela-3 | 23 September 2004; 15:07 | Kosmos-3M 11K65M | Communication | in orbit | |
| Kosmos 2410 | Yantar-4K2M | 24 September 2004; 16:50 | Soyuz-U 11A511U | Reconnaissance | 9 January 2005 | |
| Kosmos 2411 | Glonass | 26 December 2004; 13:53 | Proton-K/DM-2 8K72K | Navigation | in orbit | |
| Kosmos 2412 | Glonass | 26 December 2004; 13:53 | Proton-K/DM-2 8K72K | Navigation | in orbit | |
| Kosmos 2413 | Glonass-M | 26 December 2004; 13:53 | Proton-K/DM-2 8K72K | Navigation | in orbit | |
| Kosmos 2414 | Parus | 20 January 2005; 03:00 | Kosmos-3M 11K65M | Navigation, Communication | in orbit | |
| Kosmos 2415 | Yantar-1KFT | 2 September 2005; 09:50 | Soyuz-U 11A511U | Reconnaissance | 16 October 2005 | |
| Kosmos 2416 | Rodnik | 21 December 2005; 19:34 | Kosmos-3M 11K65M | Communication | in orbit | |
| Kosmos 2417 | Glonass-M | 25 December 2005; 05:07 | Proton-K/DM-2 8K72K | Navigation | in orbit | |
| Kosmos 2418 | Glonass-M | 25 December 2005; 05:07 | Proton-K/DM-2 8K72K | Navigation | in orbit | |
| Kosmos 2419 | Glonass | 25 December 2005; 05:07 | Proton-K/DM-2 8K72K | Navigation | in orbit | |
| Kosmos 2420 | Yantar-4K2M | 3 May 2006; 17:38 | Soyuz-U 11A511U | Reconnaissance | 19 July 2006 | |
| Kosmos 2421 | US-PU | 25 June 2006; 04:00 | Tsyklon-2 11K69 | Reconnaissance | 19 August 2010 | |
| Kosmos 2422 | US-K | 21 July 2006; 04:20 | Molniya-M/2BL 8K78M | Early warning | 22 November 2019 | |
| Kosmos 2423 | Orlets-1 | 14 September 2006; 13:41 | Soyuz-U 11A511U | Reconnaissance | 23 November 2006 | |
| Kosmos 2424 | Glonass-M | 25 December 2006; 20:18 | Proton-K/DM-2 8K72K | Navigation | in orbit | |
| Kosmos 2425 | Glonass-M | 25 December 2006; 20:18 | Proton-K/DM-2 8K72K | Navigation | in orbit | |
| Kosmos 2426 | Glonass-M | 25 December 2006; 20:18 | Proton-K/DM-2 8K72K | Navigation | in orbit | |
| Kosmos 2427 | Yantar-4K2M | 7 June 2007; 18:00 | Soyuz-U 11A511U | Reconnaissance | 22 August 2007 | |
| Kosmos 2428 | Tselina-2 | 29 June 2007; 10:00 | Zenit-2M 11K77M | ELINT | in orbit | |
| Kosmos 2429 | Parus | 11 September 2007; 13:05 | Kosmos-3M 11K65M | Navigation, Communication | in orbit | |
| Kosmos 2430 | US-K | 23 October 2007; 04:39 | Molniya-M/2BL 8K78M | Early warning | 5 January 2019 | |
| Kosmos 2431 | Glonass-M | 26 October 2007; 07:35 | Proton-K/DM-2 8K72K | Navigation | in orbit | |
| Kosmos 2432 | Glonass-M | 26 October 2007; 07:35 | Proton-K/DM-2 8K72K | Navigation | in orbit | |
| Kosmos 2433 | Glonass-M | 26 October 2007; 07:35 | Proton-K/DM-2 8K72K | Navigation | in orbit | |
| Kosmos 2434 | Glonass-M | 25 December 2007; 19:32 | Proton-M/DM-2 8K72M | Navigation | in orbit | |
| Kosmos 2435 | Glonass-M | 25 December 2007; 19:32 | Proton-M/DM-2 8K72M | Navigation | in orbit | |
| Kosmos 2436 | Glonass-M | 25 December 2007; 19:32 | Proton-M/DM-2 8K72M | Navigation | in orbit | |
| Kosmos 2437 | Rodnik | 23 May 2008; 15:20 | Rokot/Briz-KM 11A05 | Communication | in orbit | Launched with Yubeleiny |
| Kosmos 2438 | Rodnik | 23 May 2008; 15:20 | Rokot/Briz-KM 11A05 | Communication | in orbit | Launched with Yubeleiny |
| Kosmos 2439 | Rodnik | 23 May 2008; 15:20 | Rokot/Briz-KM 11A05 | Communication | in orbit | Launched with Yubeleiny |
| Kosmos 2440 | US-KMO | 26 June 2008; 23:59 | Proton-K/DM-3 8K72K | Early warning | in orbit | |
| Kosmos 2441 | Persona | 26 July 2008; 18:31 | Soyuz-2-1b 11A14B | Reconnaissance | in orbit | Spacecraft failure caused by electrical malfunction |
| Kosmos 2442 | Glonass-M | 25 September 2008; 08:49 | Proton-M/DM-2 8K72M | Navigation | in orbit | |
| Kosmos 2443 | Glonass-M | 25 September 2008; 08:49 | Proton-M/DM-2 8K72M | Navigation | in orbit | |
| Kosmos 2444 | Glonass-M | 25 September 2008; 08:49 | Proton-M/DM-2 8K72M | Navigation | in orbit | |
| Kosmos 2445 | Yantar-4K2M | 14 November 2008; 15:50 | Soyuz-U 11A511U | Reconnaissance | 23 February 2009 | |
| Kosmos 2446 | US-K | 2 December 2008; 05:00 | Molniya-M 8K78M | Early warning | in orbit | |
| Kosmos 2447 | Glonass-M | 25 December 2008; 10:43 | Proton-M/DM-2 8K72M | Navigation | in orbit | |
| Kosmos 2448 | Glonass-M | 25 December 2008; 10:43 | Proton-M/DM-2 8K72M | Navigation | in orbit | |
| Kosmos 2449 | Glonass-M | 25 December 2008; 10:43 | Proton-M/DM-2 8K72M | Navigation | in orbit | |
| Kosmos 2450 | Yantar-4K2M | 29 April 2009; 16:58 | Soyuz-U 11A511U | Reconnaissance | 27 July 2009 | |
| Kosmos 2451 | Rodnik | 6 July 2009; 01:26 | Rokot/Briz-KM 11A05 | Communication | in orbit | |
| Kosmos 2452 | Rodnik | 6 July 2009; 01:26 | Rokot/Briz-KM 11A05 | Communication | in orbit | |
| Kosmos 2453 | Rodnik | 6 July 2009; 01:26 | Rokot/Briz-KM 11A05 | Communication | in orbit | |
| Kosmos 2454 | Parus | 21 July 2009; 03:57 | Kosmos-3M 11K65M | Navigation, Communication | in orbit | Launched with Sterkh-1 |
| Kosmos 2455 | Lotos-S No.801 | 20 November 2009; 10:44 | Soyuz-U 11A511U | ELINT | in orbit | |
| Kosmos 2456 | Glonass-M | 14 December 2009; 10:38 | Proton-M/DM-2 8K72M | Navigation | in orbit | |
| Kosmos 2457 | Glonass-M | 14 December 2009; 10:38 | Proton-M/DM-2 8K72M | Navigation | in orbit | |
| Kosmos 2458 | Glonass-M | 14 December 2009; 10:38 | Proton-M/DM-2 8K72M | Navigation | in orbit | |
| Kosmos 2459 | Glonass-M | 1 March 2010; 21:19 | Proton-M/DM-2 8K72M | Navigation | in orbit | |
| Kosmos 2460 | Glonass-M | 1 March 2010; 21:19 | Proton-M/DM-2 8K72M | Navigation | in orbit | |
| Kosmos 2461 | Glonass-M | 1 March 2010; 21:19 | Proton-M/DM-2 8K72M | Navigation | in orbit | |
| Kosmos 2462 | Yantar-4K2M | 16 April 2010; 15:00 | Soyuz-U 11A511U | Reconnaissance | 21 July 2010 | |
| Kosmos 2463 | Parus | 27 April 2010; 01:05 | Kosmos-3M 11K65M | Navigation/Communications | in orbit | |
| Kosmos 2464 | Glonass-M | 2 September 2010; 00:53 | Proton-M/DM-2 8K72M | Navigation | in orbit | |
| Kosmos 2465 | Glonass-M | 2 September 2010; 00:53 | Proton-M/DM-2 8K72M | Navigation | in orbit | |
| Kosmos 2466 | Glonass-M | 2 September 2010; 00:53 | Proton-M/DM-2 8K72M | Navigation | in orbit | |
| Kosmos 2467 | Rodnik | 8 September 2010; 03:30 | Rokot/Briz-KM 11A05 | Communication | in orbit | |
| Kosmos 2468 | Rodnik | 8 September 2010; 03:30 | Rokot/Briz-KM 11A05 | Communication | in orbit | |
| Kosmos 2469 | US-K | 30 September 2010; 17:01 | Molniya-M/2BL 8K78M | Early warning | 15 October 2022 | |
| Kosmos 2470 | Geo-IK | 1 February 2011; 14:00 | Rokot/Briz-KM | Geodesy | July 15, 2013. | |
| Kosmos 2471 | GLONASS-K | 26 February 2011; 03:07 | Soyuz-2-1b/Fregat | Navigation | in orbit | |
| Kosmos 2472 | Kobalt-M | 27 June 2011; 16:00 | Soyuz-U | optical surveillance | 24 October 2011 | |
| Kosmos 2473 | Garpun | 21 September 2011; 02:47 | Proton-M/Briz-M | Communication | in orbit | |
| Kosmos 2474 | Glonass-M | 2 October 2011; 20:15 | Soyuz-2-1b/Fregat | Navigation | in orbit | |
| Kosmos 2475 | Glonass-M | 4 November 2011; 12:51 | Proton-M/Briz-M | Navigation | in orbit | |
| Kosmos 2476 | Glonass-M | 4 November 2011; 12:51 | Proton-M/Briz-M | Navigation | in orbit | |
| Kosmos 2477 | Glonass-M | 4 November 2011; 12:51 | Proton-M/Briz-M | Navigation | in orbit | |
| Kosmos 2478 | Glonass-M | 28 November 2011; 08:25 | Soyuz-2-1b/Fregat | Navigation | in orbit | |
| Kosmos 2479 | US-KMO | 30 March 2012; 05:49 | Proton-K/DM-2 | Early Warning | in orbit | |
| Kosmos 2480 | Kobalt-M | 17 May 2012; 14:05 | Soyuz-U | Optical surveillance | 24 September 2012 | |
| Kosmos 2481 | Strela-3 | 28 July 2012; 01:35 | Rokot | Communications | in orbit | |
| Kosmos 2482 | Rodnik | 15 January 2013; 16:25 | Rokot/Briz-KM 11A05 | Communication | in orbit | |
| Kosmos 2483 | Rodnik | 15 January 2013; 16:25 | Rokot/Briz-KM 11A05 | Communication | in orbit | |
| Kosmos 2484 | Rodnik | 15 January 2013; 16:25 | Rokot/Briz-KM 11A05 | Communication | in orbit | |
| Kosmos 2485 | Glonass-M | 26 April 2013; 05:23 | Soyuz-2-1b/Fregat | Navigation | in orbit | |
| Kosmos 2486 | Persona | 7 June 2013; 18:37 | Soyuz-2-1b 11A14B | Reconnaissance | in orbit | |
| Kosmos 2487 | Kondor | 27 June 2013; 16:53 | Strela | Reconnaissance | 29 November 2022 | |
| Kosmos 2488 | Rodnik | 25 December 2013; 00:31 | Rokot/Briz-KM 11A05 | Communication | in orbit | |
| Kosmos 2489 | Rodnik | 25 December 2013; 00:31 | Rokot/Briz-KM 11A05 | Communication | in orbit | |
| Kosmos 2490 | Rodnik | 25 December 2013; 00:31 | Rokot/Briz-KM 11A05 | Communication | in orbit | |
| Kosmos 2491 | Unknown | 25 December 2013; 00:31 | Rokot/Briz-KM 11A05 | ? | 23 December 2019* | Unconfirmed identity. Secret Russian satellite that NASA thinks was used orbital rendezvous and inspection maneuvers. It also had the Amateur radio satellite RS-46 attached, which operated for a while. K2491 was observed to change its orbital parameters by about 1.5 m/s at 1321UTC on 23 December 2019. It is believed that an explosion occurred from stored and undepleted propellant, although collision with a piece of space debris may have initiated the explosion. |
| Kosmos 2492 | SKRL-756 | 28 December 2013; 12:30 | Soyuz-2.1v/Volga | Radar calibration | in orbit | Unconfirmed identity |
| Kosmos 2493 | SKRL-756 | 28 December 2013; 12:30 | Soyuz-2.1v/Volga | Radar calibration | in orbit | Unconfirmed identity |
| Kosmos 2494 | Glonass-M | 23 March 2014; 22:54 | Soyuz-2-1b/Fregat | Navigation | in orbit | |
| Kosmos 2495 | Kobalt-M | 6 May 2014; 13:49 | Soyuz-2-1a | Optical surveillance | 2 September 2014 | |
| Kosmos 2496 | Rodnik | 23 May 2014; 05:27 | Rokot/Briz-KM 11A05 | Communication | in orbit | |
| Kosmos 2497 | Rodnik | 23 May 2014; 05:27 | Rokot/Briz-KM 11A05 | Communication | in orbit | |
| Kosmos 2498 | Rodnik | 23 May 2014; 05:27 | Rokot/Briz-KM 11A05 | Communication | in orbit | |
| Kosmos 2499 | Unknown | 23 May 2014; 05:27 | Rokot/Briz-KM 11A05 | ? | 4 January 2023* | Unconfirmed identity |
| Kosmos 2500 | Glonass-M | 14 June 2014; 17:16 | Soyuz-2-1b/Fregat | Navigation | in orbit | |

* — satellite was destroyed in orbit rather than decaying and burning up in the Earth's atmosphere

== See also ==
- List of USA satellites
