= Kosmos 2466 =

Russian navigation satellite

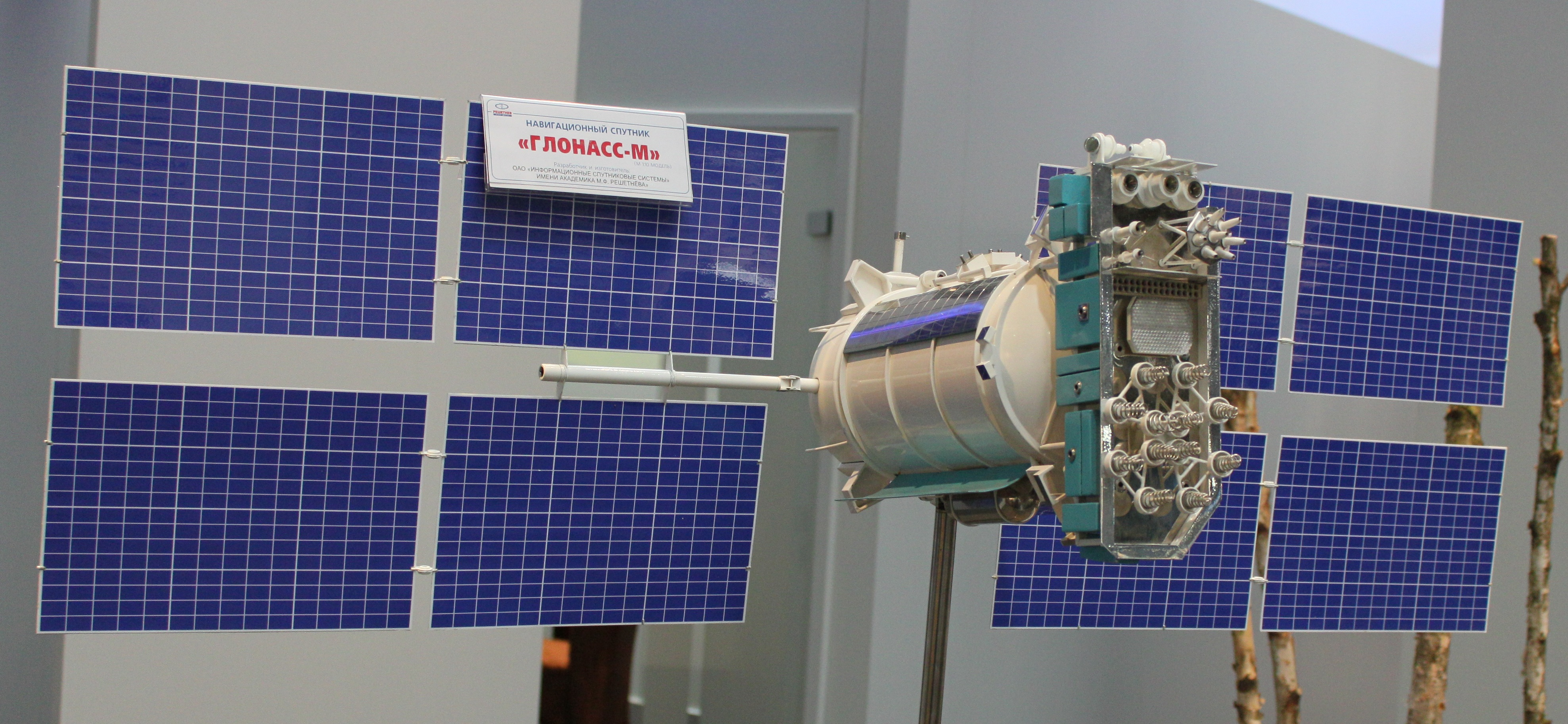
- Mission type: Navigation
- Operator: Russian Space Forces
- COSPAR ID: 2010-041A
- SATCAT no.: 37137

Spacecraft properties
- Spacecraft: GC 738
- Spacecraft type: Uragan-M
- Manufacturer: Reshetnev ISS
- Launch mass: 1,415 kilograms (3,120 lb)
- Dimensions: 1.3 metres (4 ft 3 in) diameter
- Power: 1,540 watts

Start of mission
- Launch date: September 2, 2010, 04:26 UTC
- Rocket: Proton-M/DM-2
- Launch site: Baikonur 81/24

Orbital parameters
- Reference system: Geocentric
- Regime: Medium Earth orbit
- Semi-major axis: 25,505 kilometres (15,848 mi)
- Eccentricity: 0.0003
- Perigee altitude: 19,119 kilometres (11,880 mi)
- Apogee altitude: 19,135 kilometres (11,890 mi)
- Inclination: 64.83 degrees
- Period: 675.60 minutes

Kosmos 2466 (Russian: Космос 2466 meaning Cosmos 2466) is one of a set of three Russian military satellites launched in 2010 as part of the GLONASS satellite navigation system. It was launched with Kosmos 2465 and Kosmos 2464.

This satellite is a GLONASS-M satellite, also known as Uragan-M, and is numbered Uragan-M No. 738.

Kosmos 2464/5/6 were launched from Site 81/24 at Baikonur Cosmodrome in Kazakhstan. A Proton-M carrier rocket with a Blok DM upper stage was used to perform the launch which took place at 05:49 UTC on 2 September 2010. The launch successfully placed the satellites into Medium Earth orbit. It subsequently received its Kosmos designation, and the international designator 2010-041A. The United States Space Command assigned it the Satellite Catalog Number 27137.

It is in the second orbital plane of the GLONASS constellation, in orbital slot 16. It started operations on 11 October 2010.

== See also ==
- List of Kosmos satellites (2251–2500)
- List of Proton launches (2010–2019)
