= Kosmos 2477 =

Russian navigation satellite

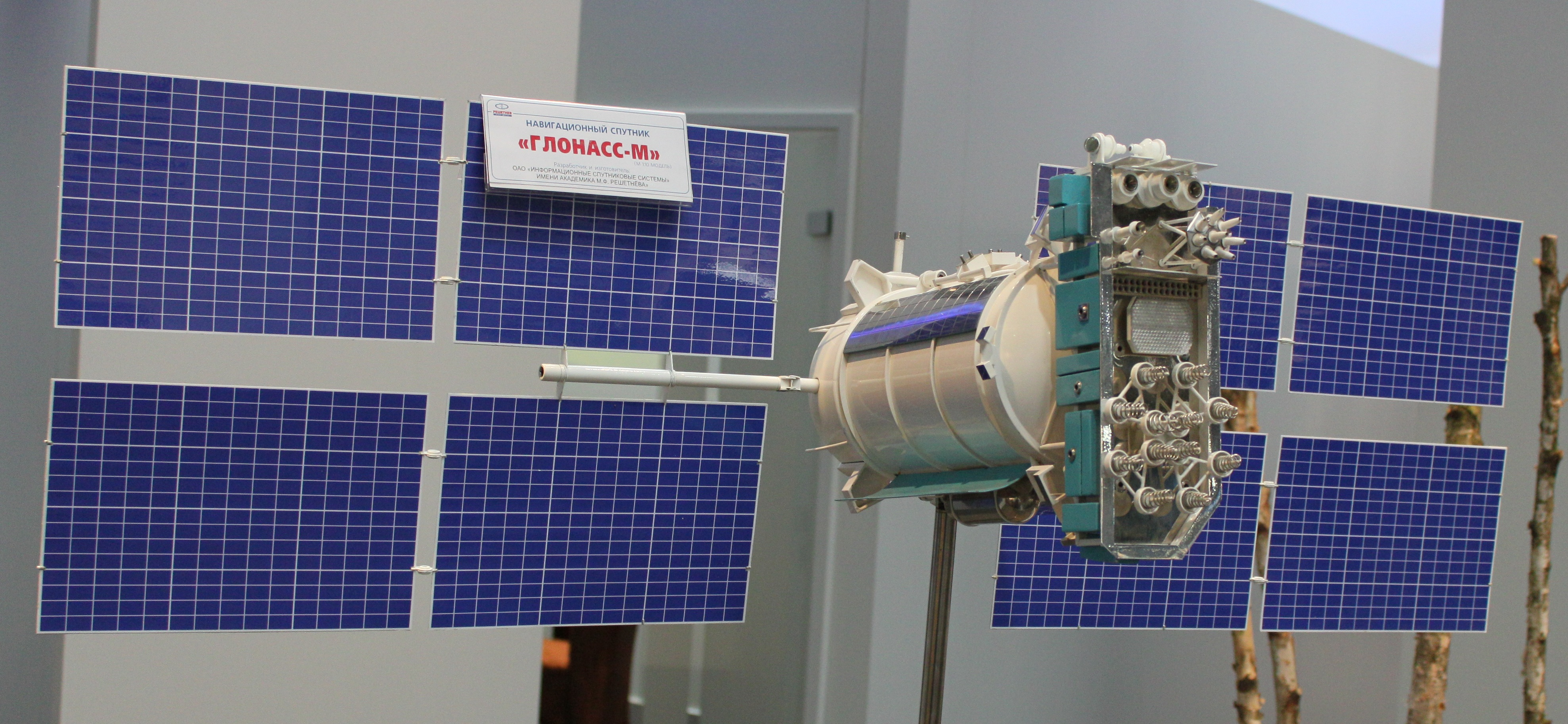
- Mission type: Navigation
- Operator: Russian Space Forces
- COSPAR ID: 2011-064B
- SATCAT no.: 37868

Spacecraft properties
- Spacecraft: GC 745
- Spacecraft type: Uragan-M
- Manufacturer: Reshetnev ISS
- Launch mass: 1,415 kilograms (3,120 lb)
- Dimensions: 1.3 metres (4 ft 3 in) diameter
- Power: 1,540 watts

Start of mission
- Launch date: November 4, 2011, 16:51 UTC
- Rocket: Proton-M/Briz-M
- Launch site: Baikonur 81/24

Orbital parameters
- Reference system: Geocentric
- Regime: Medium Earth orbit
- Semi-major axis: 25,476 kilometres (15,830 mi)
- Eccentricity: 0.0031
- Perigee altitude: 19,018 kilometres (11,817 mi)
- Apogee altitude: 19,178 kilometres (11,917 mi)
- Inclination: 64.78 degrees
- Period: 674.47 minutes

Kosmos 2477 (Russian: Космос 2477 meaning Cosmos 2477) is one of a set of three Russian military satellites launched in 2011 as part of the GLONASS satellite navigation system. It was launched with Kosmos 2475 and Kosmos 2476.

This satellite is a GLONASS-M satellite, also known as Uragan-M, and is numbered Uragan-M No. 745.

Kosmos 2475/6/7 were launched from Site 81/24 at Baikonur Cosmodrome in Kazakhstan. A Proton-M carrier rocket with a Briz-M upper stage was used to perform the launch which took place at 16:51 UTC on 4 November 2011. The launch successfully placed the satellites into Medium Earth orbit. It subsequently received its Kosmos designation, and the international designator 2011-064B. The United States Space Command assigned it the Satellite Catalog Number 37868.

It is in the first orbital plane of the GLONASS constellation, in orbital slot 7. It started operations on 18 December 2011.

== See also ==
- List of Kosmos satellites (2251–2500)
- List of Proton launches (2010–2019)
