= Kosmos 2485 =

Russian navigation satellite

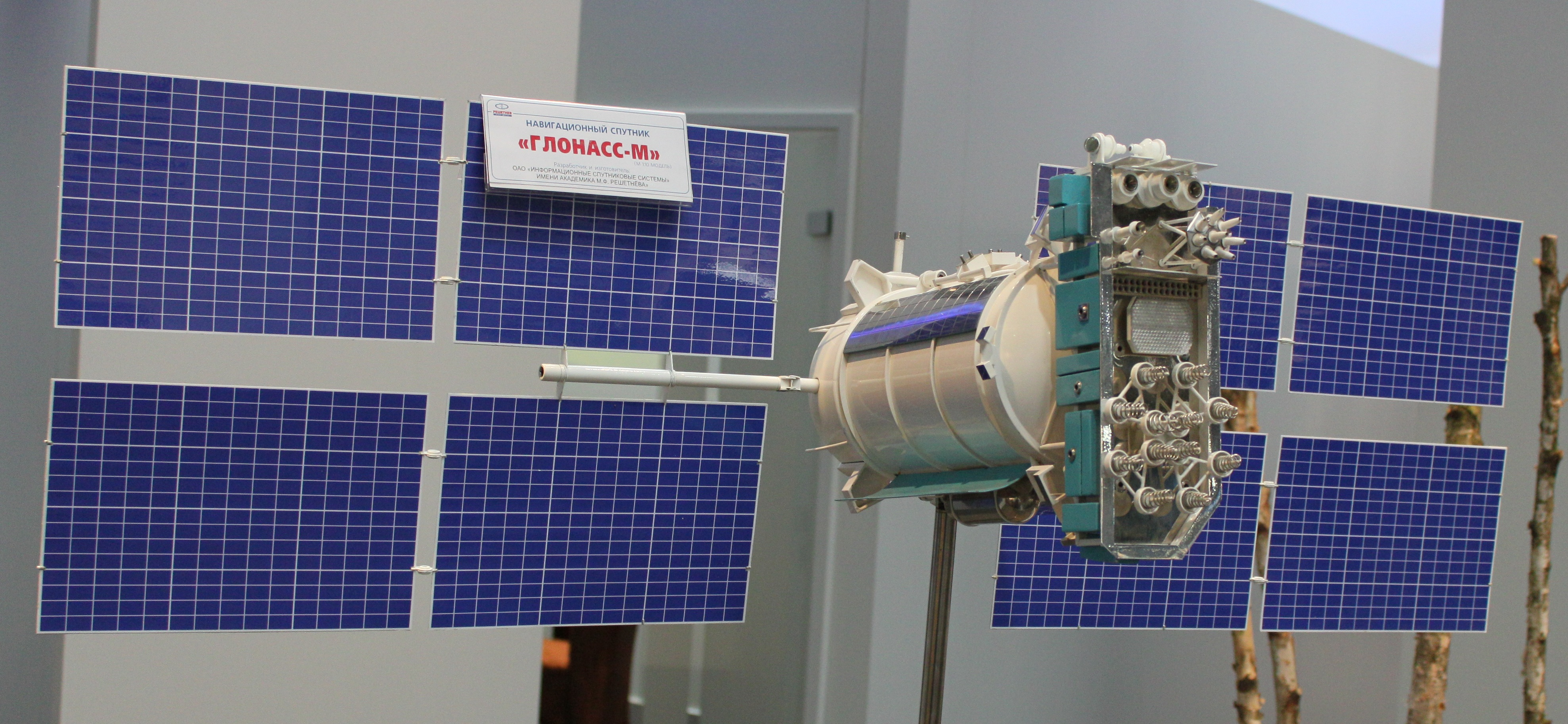
- Glonass-M satellite model
- Mission type: Navigation
- Operator: Russian Aerospace Defence Forces
- COSPAR ID: 2013-019A
- SATCAT no.: 39155
- Website: GLONASS status

Spacecraft properties
- Spacecraft: GLONASS No. 747
- Spacecraft type: Uragan-M
- Manufacturer: Reshetnev ISS
- Launch mass: 1,414 kilograms (3,117 lb)
- Dry mass: 250 kg
- Dimensions: 1.3 metres (4 ft 3 in) diameter

Start of mission
- Launch date: April 26, 2013, 05:23 UTC
- Rocket: Soyuz-2-1b/Fregat
- Launch site: Plesetsk 43/4
- Contractor: Russian Aerospace Defence Forces

Orbital parameters
- Reference system: Geocentric
- Regime: Medium Earth orbit
- Semi-major axis: 25,712 kilometres (15,977 mi)
- Eccentricity: 0.0064
- Perigee altitude: 19,169 kilometres (11,911 mi)
- Apogee altitude: 19,499 kilometres (12,116 mi)
- Inclination: 64.74 degrees
- Period: 683.87 minutes

Kosmos 2485 (Russian: Космос 2485 meaning Space 2485) is a Russian military satellite launched in 2013 as part of the GLONASS satellite navigation system.

This satellite is a GLONASS-M satellite, also known as Uragan-M, and is numbered Uragan-M No. 747.

Kosmos 2485 was launched from Site 43/4 at Plesetsk Cosmodrome in northern Russia. A Soyuz-2-1b carrier rocket with a Fregat upper stage was used to perform the launch which took place at 05:23 UTC on 26 April 2013. The launch successfully placed the satellite into Medium Earth orbit. It subsequently received its Kosmos designation, and the international designator 2013-019A. The United States Space Command assigned it the Satellite Catalog Number 39155.

The satellite is in orbital plane 1, in orbital slot 2.

== See also ==
- List of Kosmos satellites (2251–2500)
- List of R-7 launches (2010–2014)
