= Kosmos 2449 =

Russian GLONASS navigation satellite

- Mission type: Navigation
- Operator: Russian Space Forces
- COSPAR ID: 2008-067B
- SATCAT no.: 33467

Spacecraft properties
- Spacecraft: GC 729
- Spacecraft type: Uragan-M
- Manufacturer: Reshetnev ISS
- Launch mass: 1,415 kilograms (3,120 lb)
- Dimensions: 1.3 metres (4 ft 3 in) diameter
- Power: 1,540 watts

Start of mission
- Launch date: December 25, 2008, 10:43 UTC
- Rocket: Proton-M/DM-2
- Launch site: Baikonur 81/24

Orbital parameters
- Reference system: Geocentric
- Regime: Medium Earth orbit

Kosmos 2449 (Russian: Космос 2449 meaning Cosmos 2449) is one of a set of three Russian military satellites launched in 2008 as part of the GLONASS satellite navigation system. It was launched with Kosmos 2447 and Kosmos 2448.

This satellite is a GLONASS-M satellite, also known as Uragan-M, and is numbered Uragan-M No. 729.

Kosmos 2447/8/9 were launched from Site 81/24 at Baikonur Cosmodrome in Kazakhstan. A Proton-M carrier rocket with a Blok DM upper stage was used to perform the launch which took place at 10:43 UTC on 25 December 2008. The launch successfully placed the satellites into Medium Earth orbit. It subsequently received its Kosmos designation, and the international designator 2008-067B. The United States Space Command assigned it the Satellite Catalog Number 33467.

It is not currently part of the GLONASS constellation. It became operational on 12 February 2009 and was withdrawn for maintenance on 10 September 2012. It is still in orbital slot 8 in orbital plane 1.

== See also ==
- List of Kosmos satellites (2251–2500)
- List of Proton launches (2000–2009)
