= Kosmos 2461 =

Russian military satellite

- Mission type: Navigation
- Operator: Russian Space Forces
- COSPAR ID: 2010-007B
- SATCAT no.: 36401

Spacecraft properties
- Spacecraft: GC 735
- Spacecraft type: Uragan-M
- Manufacturer: Reshetnev ISS
- Launch mass: 1,415 kilograms (3,120 lb)
- Dimensions: 1.3 metres (4 ft 3 in) diameter
- Power: 1,540 watts

Start of mission
- Launch date: March 1, 2010, 21:19 UTC
- Rocket: Proton-M/DM-2
- Launch site: Baikonur 81/24

Orbital parameters
- Reference system: Geocentric
- Regime: Medium Earth orbit
- Semi-major axis: 25,505 kilometres (15,848 mi)
- Eccentricity: 0.0002
- Perigee altitude: 19,123 kilometres (11,882 mi)
- Apogee altitude: 19,132 kilometres (11,888 mi)
- Inclination: 64.77 degrees
- Period: 675.63 minutes

Kosmos 2461 (Russian: Космос 2461 meaning Cosmos 2461) is one of a set of three Russian military satellites launched in 2010 as part of the GLONASS satellite navigation system. It was launched with Kosmos 2459 and Kosmos 2460

This satellite is a GLONASS-M satellite, also known as Uragan-M, and is numbered Uragan-M No. 735.

Kosmos 2459/60/61 were launched from Site 81/24 at Baikonur Cosmodrome in Kazakhstan. A Proton-M carrier rocket with a Blok DM upper stage was used to perform the launch which took place at 21:19 UTC on 1 March 2010. The launch successfully placed the satellites into Medium Earth orbit. It subsequently received its Kosmos designation, and the international designator 2010-007B. The United States Space Command assigned it the Satellite Catalog Number 36401.

It is in the third orbital plane of the GLONASS constellation, in orbital slot 24. It started operations on 28 March 2010.

== See also ==
- List of Kosmos satellites (2251–2500)
- List of Proton launches (2010–2019)
