= Kosmos 2447 =

Russian GLONASS navigation satellite

- Mission type: Navigation
- Operator: Russian Space Forces
- COSPAR ID: 2008-067A
- SATCAT no.: 33466

Spacecraft properties
- Spacecraft: GC 727
- Spacecraft type: Uragan-M
- Manufacturer: Reshetnev ISS
- Launch mass: 1,415 kilograms (3,120 lb)
- Dimensions: 1.3 metres (4 ft 3 in) diameter
- Power: 1,540 watts

Start of mission
- Launch date: December 25, 2008, 10:43 UTC
- Rocket: Proton-M/DM-2
- Launch site: Baikonur 81/24

Orbital parameters
- Reference system: Geocentric
- Regime: Medium Earth orbit

Kosmos 2447 (Russian: Космос 2447 meaning Cosmos 2447) is one of a set of three Russian military satellites launched in 2008 as part of the GLONASS satellite navigation system. It was launched with Kosmos 2448 and Kosmos 2449.

This satellite is a GLONASS-M satellite, also known as Uragan-M, and is numbered Uragan-M No. 727.

Kosmos 2447/8/9 were launched from Site 81/24 at Baikonur Cosmodrome in Kazakhstan. A Proton-M carrier rocket with a Blok DM upper stage was used to perform the launch which took place at 10:43 UTC on 25 December 2008. The launch successfully placed the satellites into Medium Earth orbit. It subsequently received its Kosmos designation, and the international designator 2008-067A. The United States Space Command assigned it the Satellite Catalog Number 33466.

It is not currently part of the GLONASS constellation. It was in orbital slot 3 but was taken out of service on 8 September 2010 due to equipment failure.

== See also ==
- List of Kosmos satellites (2251–2500)
- List of Proton launches (2000–2009)
