= Kosmos 2397 =

Russian military early warning satellite

- Mission type: Early warning
- Operator: VKS
- COSPAR ID: 2003-015A
- SATCAT no.: 27775
- Mission duration: 5-7 years (estimate); 2 months (actual)

Spacecraft properties
- Spacecraft type: US-KMO (71Kh6)
- Manufacturer: Lavochkin
- Launch mass: 2,600 kilograms (5,700 lb)

Start of mission
- Launch date: 24 April 2003, 04:23:00 UTC
- Rocket: Proton-K/DM-2
- Launch site: Baikonur 81/24

End of mission
- Deactivated: June 2003

Orbital parameters
- Reference system: Geocentric
- Regime: Geostationary

Instruments
- Infrared telescope with 1 metre (3 ft 3 in) aperture

Kosmos 2397 (Russian: Космос 2397 meaning Cosmos 2397) is a Russian US-KMO missile early warning satellite which was launched in 2003 as part of the Russian Space Forces' Oko programme. The satellite is designed to identify missile launches using infrared telescopes.

Kosmos 2397 was launched from Site 81/24 at Baikonur Cosmodrome in Kazakhstan. A Proton-K carrier rocket with a DM-2 upper stage was used to perform the launch, which took place at 04:23 UTC on 24 April 2003. The launch successfully placed the satellite into geostationary orbit. It subsequently received its Kosmos designation, and the international designator 2003-015A. The United States Space Command assigned it the Satellite Catalog Number 27775.

The satellite developed problems two months after being launched. It started drifting eastwards in June 2003 and had reached 155E by November 2003.

== See also ==
- List of Kosmos satellites (2251–2500)
