= Kosmos 2500 =

Russian military satellite

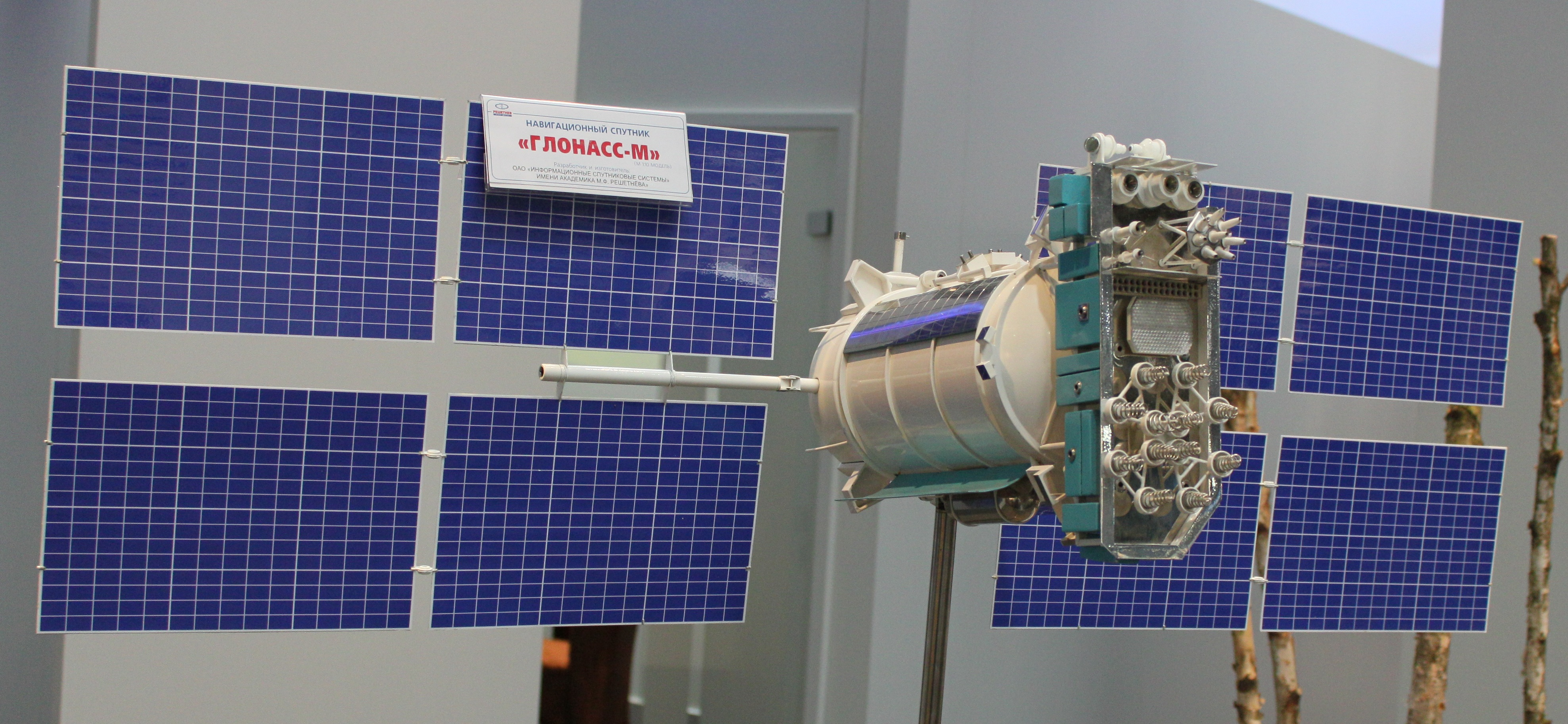
- Glonass-M satellite model
- Mission type: Navigation
- Operator: Russian Aerospace Defence Forces
- COSPAR ID: 2014-032A
- SATCAT no.: 40001
- Website: GLONASS status

Spacecraft properties
- Spacecraft: GLONASS No. 755
- Spacecraft type: Uragan-M
- Manufacturer: Reshetnev ISS
- Launch mass: 1,414 kilograms (3,117 lb)
- Dry mass: 250 kg
- Dimensions: 1.3 metres (4 ft 3 in) diameter

Start of mission
- Launch date: June 14, 2014, 17:16 UTC
- Rocket: Soyuz-2-1b/Fregat
- Launch site: Plesetsk 43/4
- Contractor: Russian Aerospace Defence Forces

Orbital parameters
- Reference system: Geocentric
- Regime: Medium Earth orbit
- Semi-major axis: 25,519 km (15,857 mi)
- Eccentricity: 0.0005
- Perigee altitude: 19,129 km (11,886 mi)
- Apogee altitude: 19,153 km (11,901 mi)
- Inclination: 64.77 degrees
- Period: 676.18 minutes
- Epoch: 15 June 2014

Kosmos 2500 (Russian: Космос 2500 meaning Space 2500) is a Russian military satellite launched in 2014 as part of the GLONASS satellite navigation system. It was the 2,500th satellite to receive a Kosmos designation

This satellite is a GLONASS-M satellite, also known as Uragan-M, and is numbered Uragan-M No. 755.

Kosmos 2500 was launched from Site 43/4 at Plesetsk Cosmodrome in northern Russia. A Soyuz-2-1b carrier rocket with a Fregat upper stage was used to perform the launch which took place at 17:16 UTC on 14 June 2014. The launch successfully placed the satellite into a Medium Earth orbit. It subsequently received its Kosmos designation, and the international designator 2014-032A. The United States Space Command assigned it the Satellite Catalog Number 40001.

The satellite is in orbital plane 3, in orbital slot 21. As of August 2014 it remains in operation.

== See also ==
- 2014 in spaceflight
- List of Kosmos satellites (2251–2500)
- List of R-7 launches (2010–2014)
