= Kosmos 2478 =

Russian navigation satellite

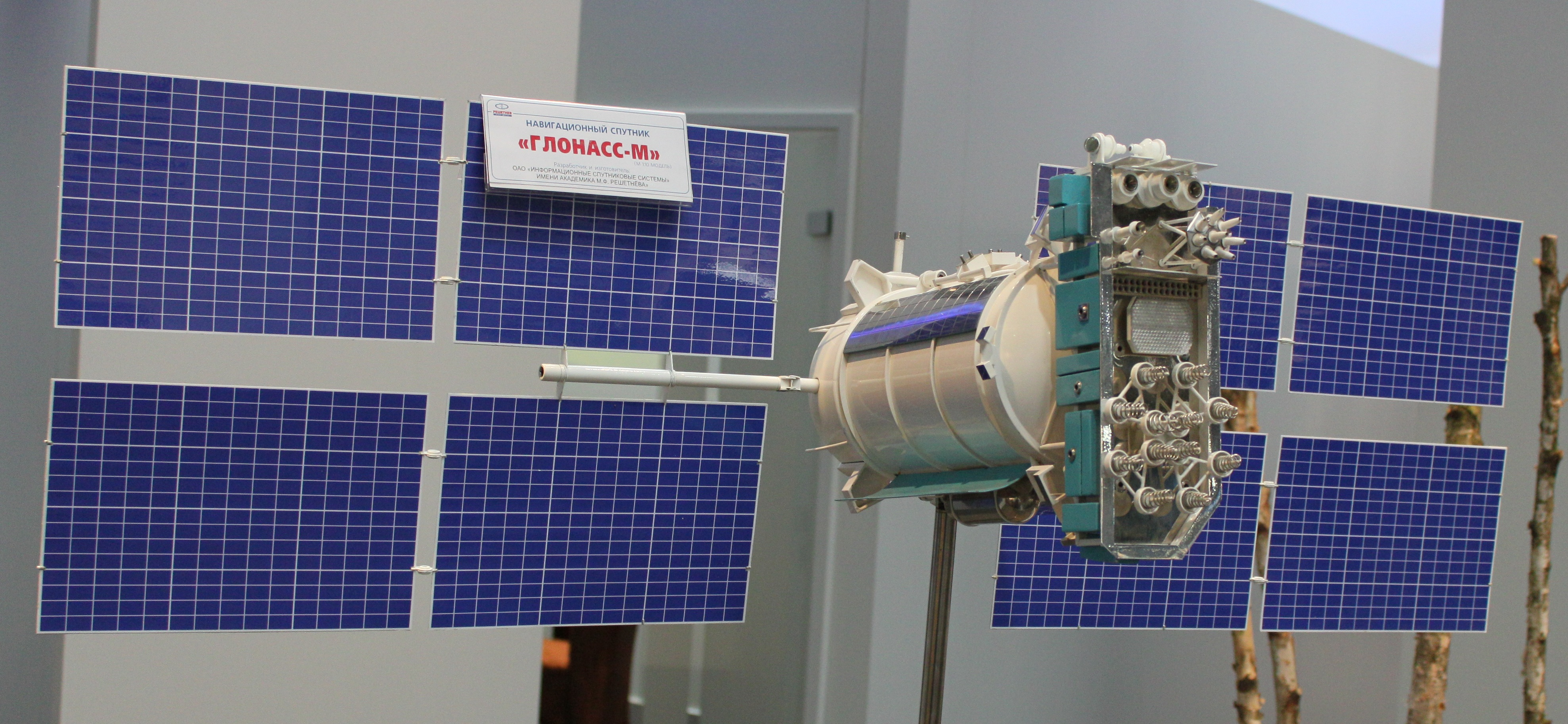
- Mission type: Navigation
- Operator: Russian Space Forces
- COSPAR ID: 2011-071A
- SATCAT no.: 37938
- Website: GLONASS status

Spacecraft properties
- Spacecraft: GC 746
- Spacecraft type: Uragan-M
- Manufacturer: Reshetnev ISS
- Launch mass: 1,415 kilograms (3,120 lb)
- Dimensions: 1.3 metres (4 ft 3 in) diameter
- Power: 1,540 watts

Start of mission
- Launch date: November 28, 2011, 08:26 UTC
- Rocket: Soyuz-2-1b/Fregat-M
- Launch site: Plesetsk 43/4

Orbital parameters
- Reference system: Geocentric
- Regime: Medium Earth orbit
- Semi-major axis: 25,523 kilometres (15,859 mi)
- Eccentricity: 0.0007
- Perigee altitude: 19,127 kilometres (11,885 mi)
- Apogee altitude: 19,163 kilometres (11,907 mi)
- Inclination: 64.82 degrees
- Period: 676.34 minutes

Kosmos 2478 (Russian: Космос 2478 meaning Cosmos 2478) is a Russian military satellite launched in 2011 as part of the GLONASS satellite navigation system.

This satellite is a GLONASS-M satellite, also known as Uragan-M, and is numbered Uragan-M No. 746.

Kosmos 2478 was launched from Site 43/4 at Plesetsk Cosmodrome in northern Russia. A Soyuz-2-1b carrier rocket with a Fregat upper stage was used to perform the launch which took place at 08:26 UTC on 28 November 2011. The launch successfully placed the satellite into Medium Earth orbit. It subsequently received its Kosmos designation, and the international designator 2011–071. The United States Space Command assigned it the Satellite Catalog Number 37938.

It is in the third orbital plane used by GLONASS, in orbital slot 17.

It started operations on 23 December 2011.

== See also ==
- List of Kosmos satellites (2251–2500)
- List of R-7 launches (2010–2014)
