= Kosmos 2474 =

Russian navigation satellite

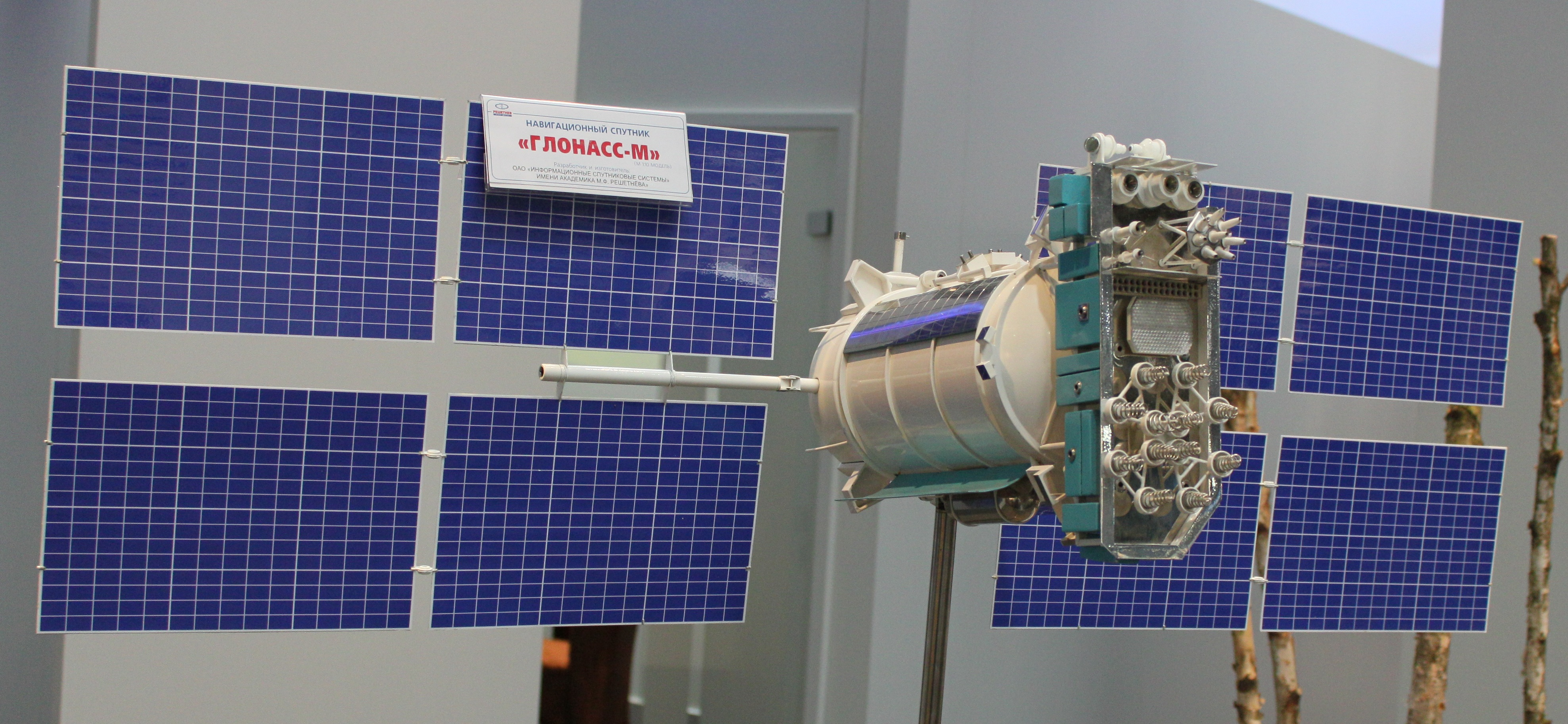
- Mission type: Navigation
- Operator: Russian Space Forces
- COSPAR ID: 2011-055A
- SATCAT no.: 37829

Spacecraft properties
- Spacecraft: GC 742
- Spacecraft type: Uragan-M
- Manufacturer: Reshetnev ISS
- Launch mass: 1,415 kilograms (3,120 lb)
- Dimensions: 1.3 metres (4 ft 3 in) diameter
- Power: 1,540 watts

Start of mission
- Launch date: October 2, 2011, 20:15 UTC
- Rocket: Soyuz-2-1b/Fregat-M
- Launch site: Plesetsk 43/4

Orbital parameters
- Reference system: Geocentric
- Regime: Medium Earth orbit
- Semi-major axis: 25,506 kilometres (15,849 mi)
- Eccentricity: 0.0011
- Perigee altitude: 19,100 kilometres (11,900 mi)
- Apogee altitude: 19,156 kilometres (11,903 mi)
- Inclination: 64.81 degrees
- Period: 675.67 minutes

Kosmos 2474 (Russian: Космос 2474 meaning Cosmos 2474) is a Russian military satellite launched in 2011 as part of the GLONASS satellite navigation system.

This satellite is a GLONASS-M satellite, also known as Uragan-M, and is numbered Uragan-M No. 742.

Kosmos 2474 was launched from Site 43/4 at Plesetsk Cosmodrome in northern Russia. A Soyuz-2-1b carrier rocket with a Fregat upper stage was used to perform the launch which took place at 20:15 UTC on 2 October 2011. The launch successfully placed the satellite into Medium Earth orbit. It subsequently received its Kosmos designation, and the international designator 2011-055A. The United States Space Command assigned them the Satellite Catalog Numbers 37829.

It was due to be launched on 25 August 2011 but was postponed due to the failed launch of Progress M-12M the day before. It was rescheduled to 25 September, and then to 1 October before being launched on 2 October.

It is in the first orbital plane used by GLONASS, in orbital slot 4.

== See also ==
- List of Kosmos satellites (2251–2500)
- List of R-7 launches (2010–2014)
