= Kosmos 2473 =

Russian communication relay satellite

- Mission type: Communications
- Operator: VKS (2011); VKO (2011-)
- COSPAR ID: 2011-048A
- SATCAT no.: 37806

Spacecraft properties
- Spacecraft type: Garpun
- Manufacturer: ISS Reshetnev

Start of mission
- Launch date: 20 September 2011, 22:47 UTC
- Rocket: Proton-M/Briz-M
- Launch site: Baikonur 81/24

Orbital parameters
- Reference system: Geocentric
- Regime: Geosynchronous

Kosmos 2473 (Russian: Космос 2473 meaning Cosmos 2473) is a Russian military communications satellite which was launched in 2011 by the Russian Space Forces. It is a Garpun (Russian: Гарпун meaning harpoon) satellite, the new generation of communication relay satellites.

== Launch ==
Kosmos 2473 was launched from Site 81/24 at Baikonur Cosmodrome in Kazakhstan. It was launched by a Proton-M carrier rocket with a Briz-M upper stage at 22:47 UTC on 20 September 2011. The launch successfully placed the satellite into geosynchronous transfer orbit. It subsequently received its Kosmos designation, and the international designator 2011-048A. The United States Space Command assigned it the Satellite Catalog Number 37806.

== Garpun ==
Kosmos 2473 is the first garpun satellite. Garpun, which have the GRAU index 14F136, are the replacement for the Geizer satellites of the Potok data system. They transmit data from other satellites to ground stations. It was announced that the first launch would be in 2009, but it was delayed until 2011. The last Geizer satellite was Kosmos 2371 which was launched in 2000 and stopped operating in 2009.

== See also ==
- List of Kosmos satellites (2251–2500)
