= Parus (satellite) =

Soviet/Russian communication and navigation satellite constellation

- Manufacturer: JSC Information Satellite Systems
- Country of origin: Soviet Union; Russia
- Operator: VKS
- Applications: Navigation; Communications

Specifications
- Bus: KAUR-1
- Launch mass: 825 kilograms (1,819 lb)
- Regime: Low Earth
- Design life: 18-24 months

Production
- Status: Decommissioned
- Built: >99
- Launched: 99
- Operational: Unknown
- Lost: 1-4
- Maiden launch: Kosmos 700, 26 December 1974

Related spacecraft
- Derived from: Tsikada

Parus (Russian: Парус meaning Sail), also Tsyklon-B or Tsiklon-B (Russian: Циклон-Б meaning Cyclone-B) and Tsikada-M (Russian: Цикада-М meaning Cicada-M), GRAU index 11F627, was a Russian, previously Soviet satellite constellation used for communication and navigation. As of 2010, 99 Parus satellites had been launched, starting with Kosmos 700 in 1974. All launches had been conducted using Kosmos-3M carrier rockets, flying from sites 132 and 133 at the Plesetsk Cosmodrome.

The prime function of Parus satellites was to provide location information for the Tsiklon-B navigation system.

Parus satellites were produced by JSC Information Satellite Systems (formerly NPO PM), based on the KAUR-1 satellite bus. They had a mass of around 825 kilograms (1,819 lb), and a design life of 18–24 months. The satellites operated in low Earth orbits, typically with a perigee of about 950 kilometres (590 mi), an apogee of 1,005 kilometres (624 mi) and 82.9° inclination. They were operated by the Russian Aerospace Defence Forces, and were used primarily for navigation, Store and forward communication, and to relay data from US-P satellites. Some of the navigation functions are believed to have been superseded by the GLONASS system.

== See also ==
- Strela (satellite)
