= GLONASS-M =

Type of Russian GLONASS navigation satellite

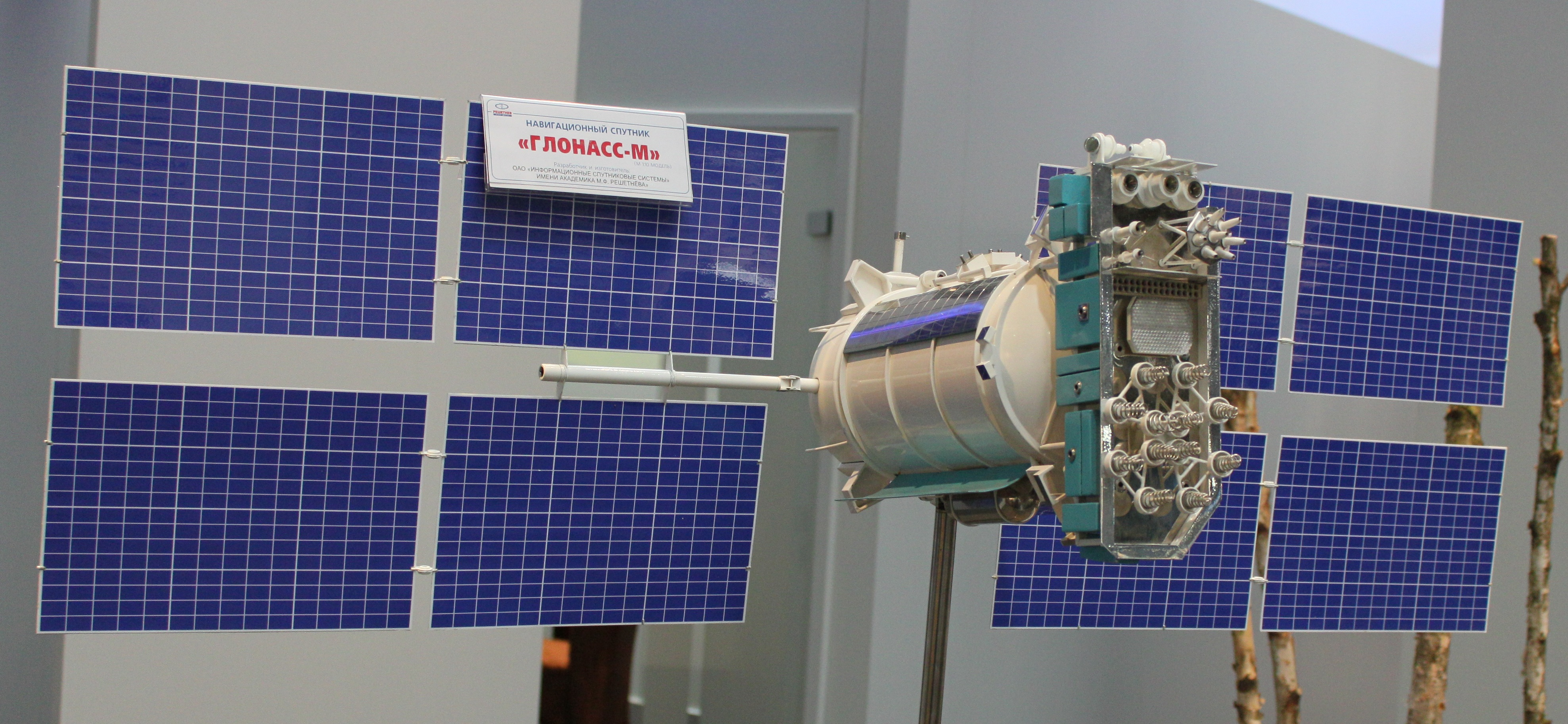
- Model of Glonass-M satellite at CeBIT 2011.
- Designer: ISS Reshetnev
- Country of origin: Russia
- Operator: JSC «Navigation-Information Systems»
- Applications: Navigation

Specifications
- Bus: 3-Axis stabilized Uragan-M
- Constellation: GLONASS
- Launch mass: 1,415 kg (3,120 lb)
- Power: 1250 W
- Batteries: NiH_{2}
- Equipment: 3 Cs clocks FDMA signals: L1OF, L1SF, L2OF and L2SF; CDMA signals: L3OC (s/n 755+); Space Laser Ranging
- Regime: MEO
- Design life: 7 years

Production
- Built: 51
- Launched: 51
- Operational: 21
- Retired: 24
- Lost: 6
- Maiden launch: 10 December 2003 (Kosmos 2404)
- Last launch: 28 November 2022 (Kosmos 2564)
- Last retirement: 3 December 2022 (Kosmos 2464)

Related spacecraft
- Derived from: GLONASS

GLONASS-M (Russian: ГЛОНАСС-М), also known as Uragan-M (Russian: Ураган-М) (GRAU index 11F654M given to the first two pilot satellites and 14F113 to the rest) are the second generation of Uragan satellite design used as part of the Russian GLONASS radio-based satellite navigation system. Developed by ISS Reshetnev (Information Satellite Systems Reshetnev), it had its debut launch in 2003, and is in the process of being phased out. Its production finished in 2015 and its last launch was in November 2022. It is an evolution of the previous Uragan (GRAU Index 11F654) second-generation satellites, improving accuracy, increasing power, extending the design life and adding the FDMA L2OF open signal. The last eight Glonass-M spacecraft in production included the new CDMA L3OC open signal.

== Design ==
It used a 3-axis stabilized pressurized bus with two solar panels, a propulsion module and a payload module. At 1,415 kilograms (3,120 lb) these are just 2 kg (4.4 lb) heavier than the previous generation, but have 25% more power 1250 W, 230% more design life (7 years), an additional signal (L2OF) and generally improved accuracy. It uses an on-board computer based on a Russian microprocessor reimplementation of the VAX 11/750 architecture: the Angstrem K1839.

The Uragan-M are usually launched in trios, and due to the close distance, the radios of the three would interfere with each other, meaning that the ground segment can only command one satellite at a time. Setting sun pointing attitude for power and then Earth pointing attitude for communications for a single unit takes about 5 hours. Since the radio contact window with ground control is between 4 and 6 hours, ground control can not control all spacecraft in a single pass. The on-board computer in the Uragan-M can put the spacecraft in sun pointing mode autonomously, and does many of the start up processes so the ground segment can take control and process the Earth pointing mode.

The payload consists of L-Band navigation signals in 25 channels separated by 0.5625 MHz intervals in 2 frequency bands: 1602.5625–1615.5 MHz and 1240–1260 MHz. EIRP 25 to 27 dBW. Right hand circular polarized. It transmits the FDMA signals L1OF, L1SF, L2OF and L2SF, with the open L2OF being new to the Uragan series. It uses 3 Cs clocks with a clock stability of 1 × 10^{−13} (an 5x improvement over the 5 × 10^{−13} clock stability of the previous generation Uragan).

In 2011 ISS Reshetnev announced plans to include the new CDMA signal L3OC, first introduced on Glonass-K series, on Glonass-M satellites flown from 2014; seven of these enhanced models were launched between 2014 and 2022 (s/n 755 to 761).

== History ==
The first generation Uragan spacecraft were created under ban of foreign radiation-hardened components and thus had been an inferior product with just 3 years of expected design life. Given the realized average life was just 22 months, and the fleet should have 24 spacecraft, it was necessary to launch more than 7 spacecraft per year to keep the fleet in good health. To this end, the Uragan-M was designed, with an increased design life of 7 years, thanks to the availability of ITAR controlled parts.

On December 1, 2001, a first generation GLONASS satellite Kosmos 2382 with new flight control and power systems was launched. This satellite was incorrectly named Uragan-M in a RIA Novosti news message issued days before the launch. When contacted by Novosti Kosmonavtiki magazine Roscosmos spokesman said all three launched satellites were first generation versions but one of them featured new upgraded flight control and power systems. Novosti Kosmonavtiki also pointed out the fact that GLONASS-M project had been approved on August 20, 2001, just three months before Kosmos 2382 launch. RIA Novosti mistake was widely propagated causing confusion regarding which satellite was the first GLONASS-M satellite.

On December 10, 2003, the first Uragan-M was launched by a Proton-K / Briz-M from Baikonur along two Uragan Block IIv satellites. On December 26, 2004, the second Uragan-M was launched by a Proton-K DM-2, also along two Uragan Block IIv satellites. And on December 25, 2005, two Uragan-M were launched along the last Uragan Block IIv satellites.

On December 25, 2006, launched the first trio of only Uragan-M. Two launches by late 2007 meant that six additional Uragan-M were added to the fleet. And another six were successfully launched in 2008. On September 12, 2008 Prime Minister Vladimir Putin signed RF Government Resolution on increasing GLONASS Program financing by 67 billion rubles. 2009 saw the launch of a single trio of Uragan-M, and with nine spacecraft planned for 2010, full service availability was expected. Regrettably, the third launch, on 5 December 2010, ended in failure, leaving no on-orbit spares.

On October 2, 2011, the first launch of single Uragan-M satellite was performed by a Soyuz-2.1b/Fregat-M which put Kosmos 2474 on orbit from the Plesetsk Cosmodrome. Another Proton-M launched trio and an additional Soyuz-2.1b/Fregat-M launch put the fleet at full operative capacity with 24 healthy satellites. On April 26, 2013, a Soyuz successfully orbited Kosmos 2485, but the Proton-M mission failed spectacularly taking with it a trio of Uragan-M. During 2014, two satellites were launched by Soyuz in March and June.

On a May 28, 2014 interview, Nikolay Testoyedov — president of ISS Reshetnev — stated that production of GLONASS-M would end in 2015, with GLONASS-K being exclusively produced after that final batch. In a December 14, 2014 interview with GPS World, he stated that while the original idea was to have just two GLONASS-K1 prototypes to be followed by the GLONASS-K2 production, international sanctions limited the supply of radiation resistant electronics. And thus, they had decided to launch an additional nine GLONASS-K1 as fleet replacement while they finished the GLONASS-K2 design. In a May, 2015 presentation, Mr. Testoyedov expected the last GLONASS-M to fly in late 2017. On July 30, 2015, ISS Reshetnev announced that it had completed the last GLONASS-M (No.61) spacecraft and it was putting it in storage waiting for launch, along with an additional eight already built satellites. The last production batch (s/n 755+) is an enhanced GLONASS-M that includes an additional transmitter and antenna for the L3OC CDMA signal. After four successful launches until 2019, the last three spacecraft remained in storage and were launched as needed in 2019-2022.

== Uragan-M launches ==
=== Statistics ===
| Launched | Operational | Not in service | Retired | Launch failures |
|---|---|---|---|---|
| 51 (all) | 21 | 0 | 24 | 6 |

== Satellites ==
| Satellite | Launch date/time (UTC) | Carrier rocket | Launch site | Launch block | Satellite type | Serial number | Orbital plane | Slot | Status / Retirement | Remarks |
|---|---|---|---|---|---|---|---|---|---|---|
| Kosmos 2404 | 10 December 2003; 13:53 | Proton-K; Briz-M | Baikonur; 81/24 | 32 | M | 701 | I | 6 | 18 June 2009 | |
| Kosmos 2413 | 26 December 2004; 13:53 | Proton-K; DM-2 | Baikonur; 200/39 | 33 | M | 712 | I | 8 | 22 November 2012 | |
| Kosmos 2418 | 25 December 2005; 05:07 | Proton-K; DM-2 | Baikonur; 81/24 | 34 | M | 713 | III | 24 | 18 February 2010 | |
| Kosmos 2419 | 25 December 2005; 05:07 | Proton-K; DM-2 | Baikonur; 81/24 | 34 | M | 714 | III | 17 | 24 February 2016 | |
| Kosmos 2424 | 25 December 2006; 20:18 | Proton-K; DM-2 | Baikonur; 81/24 | 35 | M | 715 | II | 14 | 26 June 2017 | |
| Kosmos 2425 | 25 December 2006; 20:18 | Proton-K; DM-2 | Baikonur; 81/24 | 35 | M | 716 | II | 15 | 20 July 2021 | |
| Kosmos 2426 | 25 December 2006; 20:18 | Proton-K; DM-2 | Baikonur; 81/24 | 35 | M | 717 | II | 10 | 1 August 2019 | |
| Kosmos 2431 | 26 October 2007; 07:35 | Proton-K; DM-2 | Baikonur; 81/24 | 36 | M | 718 | III | 17 | 20 October 2011 | |
| Kosmos 2432 | 26 October 2007; 07:35 | Proton-K; DM-2 | Baikonur; 81/24 | 36 | M | 719 | III | 20 | Operational | |
| Kosmos 2433 | 26 October 2007; 07:35 | Proton-K; DM-2 | Baikonur; 81/24 | 36 | M | 720 | III | 19 | Operational | |
| Kosmos 2434 | 25 December 2007; 19:32 | Proton-M; DM-2 | Baikonur; 81/24 | 37 | M | 721 | II | 13 | Operational | |
| Kosmos 2435 | 25 December 2007; 19:32 | Proton-M; DM-2 | Baikonur; 81/24 | 37 | M | 722 | II | 14 | 12 October 2011 | |
| Kosmos 2436 | 25 December 2007; 19:32 | Proton-M; DM-2 | Baikonur; 81/24 | 37 | M | 723 | II | 10 | Operational | |
| Kosmos 2442 | 25 September 2008; 08:49 | Proton-M; DM-2 | Baikonur; 81/24 | 38 | M | 724 | III | 18 | 12 February 2014 | |
| Kosmos 2443 | 25 September 2008; 08:49 | Proton-M; DM-2 | Baikonur; 81/24 | 38 | M | 725 | III | 21 | 8 July 2016 | |
| Kosmos 2444 | 25 September 2008; 08:49 | Proton-M; DM-2 | Baikonur; 81/24 | 38 | M | 726 | III | 22 | 28 November 2012 | |
| Kosmos 2447 | 25 December 2008; 10:43 | Proton-M; DM-2 | Baikonur; 81/24 | 39 | M | 727 | I | 3 | 28 November 2012 | |
| Kosmos 2448 | 25 December 2008; 10:43 | Proton-M; DM-2 | Baikonur; 81/24 | 39 | M | 728 | I | 2 | 16 October 2013 | |
| Kosmos 2449 | 25 December 2008; 10:43 | Proton-M; DM-2 | Baikonur; 81/24 | 39 | M | 729 | I | 8 | 9 September 2012 | |
| Kosmos 2456 | 14 December 2009; 10:38 | Proton-M; DM-2 | Baikonur; 81/24 | 40 | M | 730 | I | 1 | Operational | |
| Kosmos 2457 | 14 December 2009; 10:38 | Proton-M; DM-2 | Baikonur; 81/24 | 40 | M | 733 | I | 6 | Operational – No L2 Signal | |
| Kosmos 2458 | 14 December 2009; 10:38 | Proton-M; DM-2 | Baikonur; 81/24 | 40 | M | 734 | I | 5 | 6 August 2018 | |
| Kosmos 2459 | 1 March 2010; 21:19 | Proton-M; DM-2 | Baikonur; 81/24 | 41 | M | 731 | III | 22 | 10 March 2021 | |
| Kosmos 2460 | 1 March 2010; 21:19 | Proton-M; DM-2 | Baikonur; 81/24 | 41 | M | 732 | III | 23 | Operational | |
| Kosmos 2461 | 1 March 2010; 21:19 | Proton-M; DM-2 | Baikonur; 81/24 | 41 | M | 735 | III | 22 | 10 November 2022 | |
| Kosmos 2464 | 2 September 2010; 00:53 | Proton-M; DM-2 | Baikonur; 81/24 | 42 | M | 736 | II | 16 | 3 December 2022 | |
| Kosmos 2465 | 2 September 2010; 00:53 | Proton-M; DM-2 | Baikonur; 81/24 | 42 | M | 737 | II | 12 | 21 November 2016 | |
| Kosmos 2466 | 2 September 2010; 00:53 | Proton-M; DM-2 | Baikonur; 81/24 | 42 | M | 738 | II | 16 | 6 June 2016 | |
| —N/a | 5 December 2010; 10:25 | Proton-M; DM-03 | Baikonur; 81/24 | 43 | M | 739 | —N/a | | Failed to orbit | |
| —N/a | 5 December 2010; 10:25 | Proton-M; DM-03 | Baikonur; 81/24 | 43 | M | 740 | —N/a | | Failed to orbit | |
| —N/a | 5 December 2010; 10:25 | Proton-M; DM-03 | Baikonur; 81/24 | 43 | M | 741 | —N/a | | Failed to orbit | |
| Kosmos 2474 | 2 October 2011; 20:15 | Soyuz-2.1b; Fregat-M | Plesetsk; 43/4 | 45S | M | 742 | I | 4 | 26 August 2019 | |
| Kosmos 2475 | 4 November 2011; 12:51 | Proton-M; Briz-M | Baikonur; 81/24 | 44 | M | 743 | I | 8 | Operational | |
| Kosmos 2476 | 4 November 2011; 12:51 | Proton-M; Briz-M | Baikonur; 81/24 | 44 | M | 744 | I | 3 | Operational | |
| Kosmos 2477 | 4 November 2011; 12:51 | Proton-M; Briz-M | Baikonur; 81/24 | 44 | M | 745 | I | 7 | Operational | |
| Kosmos 2478 | 28 November 2011; 08:25 | Soyuz-2.1b; Fregat-M | Plesetsk; 43/4 | 46S | M | 746 | III | 17 | 13 April 2015 | Restored the system to fully operational for the first time since late 1995. |
| Kosmos 2485 | 26 April 2013; 05:23 | Soyuz-2.1b; Fregat-M | Plesetsk; 43/4 | 47S | M | 747 | I | 2 | Operational | |
| —N/a | 2 July 2013; 02:38 | Proton-M; DM-03 | Baikonur; 81/24 | 47 | M | 748 | —N/a | | Failed to orbit | |
| —N/a | 2 July 2013; 02:38 | Proton-M; DM-03 | Baikonur; 81/24 | 47 | M | 749 | —N/a | | Failed to orbit | |
| —N/a | 2 July 2013; 02:38 | Proton-M; DM-03 | Baikonur; 81/24 | 47 | M | 750 | —N/a | | Failed to orbit | |
| Kosmos 2494 | 23 March 2014; 22:54 | Soyuz-2.1b; Fregat-M | Plesetsk; 43/4 | 48S | M | 754 | III | 18 | Operational | |
| Kosmos 2500 | 14 June 2014; 17:16 | Soyuz-2.1b; Fregat-M | Plesetsk; 43/4 | 49S | M | 755 | III | 21 | Operational | First spacecraft to include CDMA L3OC transmitter and antenna |
| Kosmos 2514 | 7 February 2016; 00:21 | Soyuz-2.1b; Fregat-M | Plesetsk; 43/4 | 50S | M | 751 | III | 17 | Operational | |
| Kosmos 2516 | 29 May 2016; 08:44 | Soyuz-2.1b; Fregat-M | Plesetsk; 43/4 | 51S | M | 753 | II | 11 | November 2020 | |
| Kosmos 2522 | 22 September 2017; 00:02 | Soyuz-2.1b; Fregat-M | Plesetsk; 43/4 | 52S | M | 752 | II | 14 | Operational | |
| Kosmos 2527 | 17 June 2018; 21:46 | Soyuz-2.1b; Fregat-M | Plesetsk; 43/4 | 53S | M | 756 | I | 5 | Operational | |
| Kosmos 2529 | 3 November 2018; 20:17 | Soyuz-2.1b; Fregat-M | Plesetsk; 43/4 | 54S | M | 757 | II | 15 | Operational | |
| Kosmos 2534 | 27 May 2019; 06:23 | Soyuz-2.1b; Fregat-M | Plesetsk; 43/4 | 55S | M | 758 | II | 12 | Operational | |
| Kosmos 2544 | 11 December 2019; 08:54 | Soyuz-2.1b; Fregat-M | Plesetsk; 43/3 | 56S | M | 759 | I | 4 | Operational | |
| Kosmos 2545 | 16 March 2020; 18:28 | Soyuz-2.1b; Fregat-M | Plesetsk; 43/4 | 57S | M | 760 | III | 24 | Operational | |
| Kosmos 2564 | 28 November 2022; 15:13 | Soyuz-2.1b; Fregat-M | Plesetsk; 43/3 | 61S | M | 761 | II | 16 | Operational | |
