= List of R-7 launches (2025–2029) =

This is a list of launches made by the R-7 Semyorka ICBM, and its derivatives between 2025 and 2029. All launches are orbital satellite launches, unless stated otherwise.

== Launch statistics ==
=== Rocket configurations ===
- Soyuz-2.1a
- Soyuz-2.1b
- Soyuz-2.1v
- Soyuz-STA
- Soyuz-STB

=== Launch sites ===
- Baikonur Site 1/5
- Baikonur Site 31/6
- Plesetsk Site 43/3
- Plesetsk Site 43/4
- Vostochny Site 1S
- Guiana ELS

=== Launch outcomes ===
- Failure
- Partial failure
- Success
- Scheduled

== Launch history ==
=== 2025 ===
| Flight No. | Date / time (UTC) | Rocket, Configuration | Launch site | Payload | Payload mass | Orbit | Customer | Launch outcome |
| | 5 February 2025, 03:59:24 | Soyuz-2.1v / Volga (14A15) | Site 43/4, Plesetsk | Kosmos 2581-2583 (MKA B1-3) | | Polar | VKS | Success |
Final flight of Soyuz 2.1v
| | 27 February 2025, 21:24:27 | Soyuz-2.1a (14A14A) | Site 31/6, Baikonur | Progress MS-30 | 7280kg | LEO (ISS) | Roscosmos | Success |
ISS logistics
| | 2 March 2025, 22:22:16 | Soyuz-2.1b / Fregat-M (14A14B) | Site 43/3, Plesetsk | Kosmos 2584 (GLONASS-K2 No. 14L (K2 No.2)) | | MEO | VKS | Success |
Navigation satellite
| | 8 April 2025, 05:47:15 | Soyuz-2.1a (14A14A) | Site 31/6, Baikonur | Soyuz MS-27 | 7152kg | LEO (ISS) | Roscosmos | Success |
ISS crew transport
| | 23 May 2025, 08:36 | Soyuz-2.1b / Fregat-M (14A14B) | Site 43/4, Plesetsk | Kosmos 2588 (Nivelir-L №5) | | LEO | VKS | Success |
Part of the Nivelir program which is reportedly testing orbital inspection and anti-satellite technology
| | 3 July 2025, 19:32:40 | Soyuz-2.1a (14A14A) | Site 31/6, Baikonur | Progress MS-31 | 7280kg | LEO (ISS) | Roscosmos | Success |
ISS logistics
| | 25 July 2025, 05:54:04 | Soyuz-2.1b / Fregat-M (14A14B) | Site 1S, Vostochny | Ionosfera-M No.3; Ionosfera-M No.4; 18 codeshare satellites | | SSO | Roscosmos | Success |
Ionospheric research; Various uses
| | 20 August 2025, 17:13:10 | Soyuz-2.1a (14A14A) | Site 31/6, Baikonur | Bion-M No.2 | | LEO | Institute of Biomedical Problems, Russian Academy of Sciences | Success |
Biological science
| | 11 September 2025, 15:54:06 | Soyuz-2.1a (14A14A) | Site 31/6, Baikonur | Progress MS-32 | 7280kg | LEO (ISS) | Roscosmos | Success |
ISS logistics
| | 13 September 2025, 02:10:00 | Soyuz-2.1b / Fregat-M (14A14B) | Site 43/3, Plesetsk | Kosmos 2595 (GLONASS-K No. 18L); Kosmos 2596 (Mozhayets-6) | | MEO | VKS | Success |
Navigation & Small experimental satellite
| | 27 November 2025, 09:27:57 | Soyuz-2.1a (14A14A) | Site 31/6, Baikonur | Soyuz MS-28 | 7152kg | LEO (ISS) | Roscosmos | Success |
ISS crew transport. Although the launch was successful, the pad "[suffered] major damage," with the mobile service platform collapsing into the flame duct below the pad. At the time, it was unclear if arrangements could be made in the interim to support Soyuz or Progress launches, as Site 31/6 is the only launch platform able to support Russian orbital crew launches, though it was suspected it may be possible to borrow duplicate hardware from other sites, such as Site 1/5. On 3 March, 2026, Roscosmos had announced that repairs at Site 31/6 had been completed with the restoration of the service cabin.
| | 25 December 2025, 14:11 | Soyuz-2.1a (14A14A) | Site 43/4, Plesetsk | Obzor-R No.1 | | SSO | Roscosmos | Success |
Earth observation
| | 28 December 2025, 13:18:05 | Soyuz-2.1b / Fregat-M (14A14B) | Site 1S, Vostochny | Aist-2T No.1; Aist-2T No.2; 50 rideshares | | SSO | Roscosmos and others | Partial failure |
Earth observation and various other uses Failed to deploy all payloads
=== 2026 ===
| | 5 February 2026, 18:59 | Soyuz-2.1b / Fregat-M (14A14B) | Site 43/4, Plesetsk | Kosmos (Unknown Payload) | | SSO | VKS | Success |
Military payload
| | 22 March 2026, 11:59:51 | Soyuz-2.1a (14A14A) | Site 31/6, Baikonur | Progress MS-33 | 7280kg | LEO (ISS) | Roscosmos | Success |
ISS logistics
| | 23 March 2026, 17:24 | Soyuz-2.1b (14A14B) | Site 43/4, Plesetsk | 16 × Rassvet-3 | | LEO | Buro 1440 | Success |
Internet constellation; first batch of Rassvet-3 satellites for the Buro-1440 internet constellation
| | 3 April 2026, 06:28 | Soyuz-2.1a / Fregat-M (14A14A) | Site 43/3, Plesetsk | Meridian-M 11 (21L) | | Molniya orbit | VKS | Success |
Military communications
| | 25 April 2026, 22:21:47 | Soyuz-2.1a (14A14A) | Site 31/6, Baikonur | Progress MS-34 | 7280kg | LEO (ISS) | Roscosmos | Success |
ISS logistics
| | 14 July 2026, 14:47:43 | Soyuz-2.1a (14A14A) | Site 31/6, Baikonur | Soyuz MS-29 | 7152kg | LEO (ISS) | Roscosmos | Success |
ISS crew transport
| | 16 September 2026, 13:33:54 | Soyuz-2.1a (14A14A) | Site 31/6, Baikonur | Progress MS-35 | 7280kg | LEO (ISS) | Roscosmos | Success |
ISS logistics

== Future launches ==
=== 2026 ===
| Flight No. | Date / time (UTC) | Rocket, Configuration | Launch site | Payload | Payload mass | Orbit | Customer | Launch outcome |
| | 2026 | Soyuz-2.1a (14A14A) | Site 31/6, Baikonur | Progress MS-36 | | LEO (ISS) | Roscosmos | Scheduled |
ISS logistics
| | October 2026 | Soyuz-2.1a (14A14A) | Site 31/6, Baikonur | Progress MS-37 | | LEO (ISS) | Roscosmos | Scheduled |
ISS logistics
=== 2027 ===
| Flight No. | Date / time (UTC) | Rocket, Configuration | Launch site | Payload | Payload mass | Orbit | Customer | Launch outcome |
| | March 2027 | Soyuz-2.1a (14A14A) | Site 31/6, Baikonur | Soyuz MS-30 | | LEO (ISS) | Roscosmos | Scheduled |
ISS crewed mission
| | 2027 | Soyuz 2.1b / Fregat (14A14B) | Site 1S, Vostochny | Luna 26 | 2100kg | TLI | Roscosmos | Planned |
Lunar orbiter
