= List of R-7 launches (2015–2019) =

This is a list of launches made by the R-7 Semyorka ICBM, and its derivatives between 2015 and 2019. All launches are orbital satellite launches, unless stated otherwise.

== Launch statistics ==
=== Rocket configurations ===
- Soyuz-U
- Soyuz-FG
- Soyuz-2.1a
- Soyuz-2.1b
- Soyuz-2-1v
- Soyuz-STA
- Soyuz-STB

=== Launch sites ===
- Baikonur Site 1/5
- Baikonur Site 31/6
- Plesetsk Site 43/3
- Plesetsk Site 43/4
- Vostochny Site 1S
- Kourou ELS

=== Launch outcomes ===
- Failure
- Partial failure
- Success
- Scheduled

== Launch history ==
=== 2015 ===
Flight No.	Date / time (UTC)	Rocket, Configuration	Launch site	Payload	Payload mass	Orbit	Customer	Launch outcome
	17 February 2015, 11:00:17	Soyuz-U (11A511U)	LC-1/5, Baikonur	Progress M-26M				Success
ISS logistics
	27 February 2015, 11:01:35	Soyuz-2.1a (14A14A)	LC-43/4, Plesetsk	Kosmos 2503 (Bars-M)				Success
Military reconnaissance satellite
	27 March 2015, 19:42:57	Soyuz-FG (11A511U-FG)	LC-1/5, Baikonur	Soyuz TMA-16M				Success
Crewed flight with three cosmonauts, ISS Expedition 43/44/45/46
VS-11	27 March 2015, 21:46:18	Soyuz-STB / Fregat (14A14B)	ELS, Kourou	Galileo FOC FM3/FM4				Success
VS-11	Navigation satellites							
	28 April 2015, 07:09:50	Soyuz-2.1a (14A14A)	LC-31/6, Baikonur	Progress M-27M				Failure
ISS logistics. Spacecraft lost communications and attitude control soon after separation after damaged by vibration issues during launch. International Space Station docking attempt cancelled. Mission declared a total loss.
	5 June 2015, 15:23:54	Soyuz-2.1a (14A14A)	LC-43/4, Plesetsk	Kosmos 2505 (Kobal't-M)				Success
Reconnaissance film-return satellite
	23 June 2015, 16:44:00	Soyuz-2.1b (14A14B)	LC-43/4, Plesetsk	Kosmos 2506 (Persona)				Success
Reconnaissance satellite
	3 July 2015, 04:55:48	Soyuz-U (11A511U)	LC-1/5, Baikonur	Progress M-28M				Success
ISS logistics
	22 July 2015, 21:02:44	Soyuz-FG (11A511U-FG)	LC-1/5, Baikonur	Soyuz TMA-17M				Success
Crewed flight with three cosmonauts, ISS Expedition 44/45
	2 September 2015, 04:37:43	Soyuz-FG (11A511U-FG)	LC-1/5, Baikonur	Soyuz TMA-18M				Success
Crewed flight with three cosmonauts
VS-12	11 September 2015, 02:08:10	Soyuz-STB / Fregat (14A14B)	ELS, Kourou	Galileo FOC FM5/FM6				Success
VS-12	Navigation satellites							
	1 October 2015, 16:49:40	Soyuz-U (11A511U)	LC-1/5, Baikonur	Progress M-29M				Success
ISS logistics
	17 November 2015, 06:33:41	Soyuz-2.1b / Fregat (14A14B)	LC-43/4, Plesetsk	Kosmos 2510 (EKS (Tundra))				Success
Reconnaissance satellite
	5 December 2015, 14:08:33	Soyuz-2-1v / Volga (14A15)	LC-43/4, Plesetsk	Kosmos 2511 (Kanopus-ST); Kosmos 2512 (KYuA)				Partial failure
Reconnaissance satellites; Kanopus-ST did not separate from the Volga upper stage
	15 December 2015, 11:03:09	Soyuz-FG (11A511U-FG)	LC-1/5, Baikonur	Soyuz TMA-19M				Success
Crewed flight with three cosmonauts, ISS Expedition 46/47
VS-13	17 December 2015, 11:51:56	Soyuz-STB / Fregat (14A14B)	ELS, Kourou	Galileo FOC FM8/FM9				Success
VS-13	Navigation satellites							
	21 December 2015, 08:44:39	Soyuz-2.1a (14A14A)	LC-31/6, Baikonur	Progress MS-01				Success
ISS logistics
=== 2016 ===
Flight No.	Date / time (UTC)	Rocket, Configuration	Launch site	Payload	Payload mass	Orbit	Customer	Launch outcome
	7 February 2016, 00:21:07	Soyuz-2.1b / Fregat (14A14B)	LC-43/4, Plesetsk	Kosmos 2514 (GLONASS-M)				Success
Navigation satellite
	13 March 2016, 18:56:00	Soyuz-2.1b (14A14B)	LC-31/6, Baikonur	Resurs-P No.3				Success
Earth observation satellite
	18 March 2016, 21:26:38	Soyuz-FG (11A511U-FG)	LC-1/5, Baikonur	Soyuz TMA-20M				Success
Crewed flight with three cosmonauts, ISS Expedition 47/48
	24 March 2016, 09:42:00	Soyuz-2.1a (14A14A)	LC-43/4, Plesetsk	Kosmos 2515 (Bars-M)				Success
Military reconnaissance satellite
	31 March 2016, 16:23:57	Soyuz-2.1a (14A14A)	LC-31/6, Baikonur	Progress MS-02				Success
ISS logistics
VS-14	25 April 2016, 21:01:13	Soyuz-STA / Fregat (14A14A)	ELS, Kourou	Sentinel-1B; MICROSCOPE; AAUSAT-4 e-st@r 2 OUFTI-1				Success
VS-14	Earth observation, cosmology and technology demonstration satellites							
	28 April 2016, 02:01:21	Soyuz-2.1a / Volga (14A14A)	LC-1S, Vostochny	Mikhailo Lomonosov; Aist-2D; SamSat 218				Success
Cosmology, Earth observation and technology demonstration satellites. First ever launch from the Vostochny Cosmodrome.
VS-15	24 May 2016, 08:48:43	Soyuz-STB / Fregat-MT (14A14B)	ELS, Kourou	Galileo FOC FM10/FM11				Success
VS-15	Navigation satellites							
	29 May 2016, 08:44:35	Soyuz-2.1b / Fregat-M (14A14B)	LC-43/4, Plesetsk	Kosmos 2516 (GLONASS-M)				Success
Navigation satellite
	7 July 2016, 01:36:40	Soyuz-FG (11A511U-FG)	LC-1/5, Baikonur	Soyuz MS-01				Success
Crewed flight with three cosmonauts, ISS Expedition 48/49
	16 July 2016, 21:41:45	Soyuz-U (11A511U)	LC-31/6, Baikonur	Progress MS-03				Success
ISS logistics
	19 October 2016, 08:05:14	Soyuz-FG (11A511U-FG)	LC-31/6, Baikonur	Soyuz MS-02				Success
Crewed flight with three cosmonauts, ISS Expedition 49/50
	17 November 2016, 20:20:13	Soyuz-FG (11A511U-FG)	LC-1/5, Baikonur	Soyuz MS-03				Success
Crewed flight with three cosmonauts, ISS Expedition 50/51
	1 December 2016, 14:51:52	Soyuz-U (11A511U)	LC-1/5, Baikonur	Progress MS-04				Failure
ISS logistics. Blok I turbopump disintegrated T+382 seconds, rupturing the LOX tank. The Blok I and payload broke up over Tuva.
=== 2017 ===
Flight No.	Date / time (UTC)	Rocket, Configuration	Launch site	Payload	Payload mass	Orbit	Customer	Launch outcome
VS-16	28 January 2017, 01:03:34	Soyuz-STB / Fregat-MT (14A14B)	ELS, Kourou	Hispasat 36W-1				Success
VS-16	Communication satellite							
	22 February 2017, 05:58:33	Soyuz-U (11A511U)	LC-1/5, Baikonur	Progress MS-05				Success
ISS logistics. Final flight of Soyuz-U
	20 April 2017, 07:13:43	Soyuz-FG (11A511U-FG)	LC-1/5, Baikonur	Soyuz MS-04				Success
Crewed flight with two cosmonauts. ISS Expedition 51/52.
VS-17	18 May 2017, 11:54:53	Soyuz-STA / Fregat-MT (14A14A)	ELS, Kourou	SES-15				Success
VS-17	Communication satellite							
	25 May 2017, 06:34	Soyuz-2.1b / Fregat (14A14B)	LC-43/4, Plesetsk	Kosmos 2518 (EKS (Tundra))				Success
Reconnaissance satellite
	14 June 2017, 09:20:13	Soyuz-2.1a (14A14A)	LC-31/6, Baikonur	Progress MS-06				Success
ISS logistics
	23 June 2017, 18:04:33	Soyuz-2-1v / Volga (14A15)	LC-43/4, Plesetsk	Kosmos 2519; Kosmos 2521; Kosmos 2523				Success
Reconnaissance satellites
	14 July 2017, 06:36:49	Soyuz-2.1a / Fregat (14A14A)	LC-31/6, Baikonur	Kanopus-V-IK; 72 other satellites				Partial failure
Earth observation satellite. Some of the secondary satellites were deployed to the wrong orbits, and some secondary satellite operators collected insurance for DOA satellites. Glavkosmos initially disagreed that there was a launch failure, but eventually confirmed a problem with the Fregat upper stage.
	28 July 2017, 15:41:12	Soyuz-FG (11A511U-FG)	LC-1/5, Baikonur	Soyuz MS-05				Success
Piloted flight with three cosmonauts. ISS Expedition 52/53.
	12 September 2017, 21:17:02	Soyuz-FG (11A511U-FG)	LC-1/5, Baikonur	Soyuz MS-06				Success
Piloted flight with three cosmonauts. ISS Expedition 53/54.
	22 September 2017, 00:02:32	Soyuz-2.1b / Fregat-M (14A14B)	LC-43/4, Plesetsk	Kosmos 2522 (GLONASS-M)				Success
Navigation satellite
	14 October 2017, 08:46:53	Soyuz-2.1a (14A14A)	LC-31/6, Baikonur	Progress MS-07				Success
ISS logistics
	28 November 2017, 05:41:46	Soyuz-2.1b / Fregat-M (14A14B)	LC-1S, Vostochny	Meteor-M No.2-1; 18 microsatellites				Failure
Weather satellite, commercial microsatellite launches. Fregat programming error caused upper stage in wrong attitude configuration during first engine burn and led to accidental de-orbit
	2 December 2017, 10:43:26	Soyuz-2.1b (14A14B)	LC-43/4, Plesetsk	Kosmos-2524 (Lotos-S No.803)				Success
Military reconnaissance satellite
	17 December 2017, 07:21:01	Soyuz-FG (11A511U-FG)	LC-1/5, Baikonur	Soyuz MS-07				Success
Piloted flight with three cosmonauts. ISS Expedition 54/55.
=== 2018 ===
Flight No.	Date / time (UTC)	Rocket, Configuration	Launch site	Payload	Payload mass	Orbit	Customer	Launch outcome
	1 February 2018, 02:07:18	Soyuz-2.1a / Fregat-M (14A14A)	LC-1S, Vostochny	Kanopus-V-3; Kanopus-V-4; 9 cubesats				Success
Earth observation satellites
	13 February 2018, 08:13:33	Soyuz-2.1a (14A14A)	LC-31/6, Baikonur	Progress MS-08				Success
ISS logistics
VS-18	9 March 2018, 17:10:06	Soyuz-STB / Fregat-MT (14A14B)	ELS, Kourou	O3b (x4)				Success
VS-18	Low Earth orbit communication satellites							
	21 March 2018, 17:44:23	Soyuz-FG (11A511U-FG)	LC-1/5, Baikonur	Soyuz MS-08				Success
Piloted flight with three cosmonauts. ISS Expedition 55/56.
	29 March 2018, 17:38:42	Soyuz-2-1v (14A15)	LC-43/4, Plesetsk	Kosmos 2525 (EMKA)				Success
Reconnaissance satellite
	6 June 2018, 11:12:39	Soyuz-FG (11A511U-FG)	LC-1/5, Baikonur	Soyuz MS-09				Success
Piloted flight with three cosmonauts. ISS Expedition 56/57.
	16 June 2018, 21:46:28	Soyuz-2.1b / Fregat-M (14A14B)	LC-43/4, Plesetsk	Kosmos 2527 (GLONASS-M)				Success
Navigation satellite
	9 July 2018, 21:51:34	Soyuz-2.1a (14A14A)	LC-31/6, Baikonur	Progress MS-09				Success
ISS logistics
	11 October 2018, 08:40:15	Soyuz-FG (11A511U-FG)	LC-1/5, Baikonur	Soyuz MS-10				Failure
Piloted flight with two cosmonauts. ISS Expedition 57/58. Blok D strap-on collided with the core at staging due to an improper shutdown sequence caused by prelaunch damage. Crew escaped and were recovered successfully.
	25 October 2018, 00:15:18	Soyuz-2.1b (14A14B)	LC-43/4, Plesetsk	Kosmos-2528 (Lotos-S No.804)				Success
Military reconnaissance satellite
	3 November 2018, 20:17:53	Soyuz-2.1b / Fregat-M (14A14B)	LC-43/4, Plesetsk	Kosmos 2529 (GLONASS-M)				Success
Navigation satellite
VS-19	7 November 2018, 00:47:27	Soyuz-STB / Fregat-M (14A14B)	ELS, Kourou	MetOp-C				Success
VS-19	Weather satellite							
	16 November 2018, 18:14:08	Soyuz-FG (11A511U-FG)	LC-1/5, Baikonur	Progress MS-10				Success
ISS logistics
	3 December 2018, 11:31:52	Soyuz-FG (11A511U-FG)	LC-1/5, Baikonur	Soyuz MS-11				Success
Piloted flight with three cosmonauts. ISS Expedition 58/59.
VS-20	19 December 2018, 16:37:14	Soyuz-STA / Fregat-M (14A14A)	ELS, Kourou	CSO-1				Success
VS-20	Reconnaissance satellite							
	27 December 2018, 02:07:18	Soyuz-2.1a / Fregat-M (14A14A)	LC-1S, Vostochny	Kanopus-V-5; Kanopus-V-6; 26 cubesats				Success
Earth observation satellites
=== 2019 ===
Flight No.	Date / time (UTC)	Rocket, Configuration	Launch site	Payload	Payload mass	Orbit	Customer	Launch outcome
	21 February 2019, 16:47	Soyuz-2.1b / Fregat-M (14A14B)	LC-31/6, Baikonur	EgyptSat-A				Success
Earth observation satellite Rocket's third stage shut down several seconds early due to improper fuel/oxidizer loading, but performance shortfall fully compensated by Fregat upper stage.
VS-21	27 February 2019, 21:37:00	Soyuz-STB / Fregat-M (14A14B)	ELS, Kourou	OneWeb 0006/0007/0008/0010/0011/0012				Success
VS-21	Low Earth orbit communication satellites							
	14 March 2019, 19:14:08	Soyuz-FG (11A511U-FG)	LC-1/5, Baikonur	Soyuz MS-12				Success
Piloted flight with three cosmonauts. ISS Expedition 59/60.
	4 April 2019, 11:01:34	Soyuz-2.1a (14A14A)	LC-31/6, Baikonur	Progress MS-11				Success
ISS logistics
VS-22	4 April 2019, 17:03:37	Soyuz-STB / Fregat-MT (14A14B)	ELS, Kourou	O3b (x4)				Success
VS-22	Low Earth orbit communication satellites							
	27 May 2019, 06:23:00	Soyuz-2.1b / Fregat-M (14A14B)	LC-43/4, Plesetsk	Kosmos 2534 (GLONASS-M)				Success
Navigation satellite
	5 July 2019, 05:41:46	Soyuz-2.1b / Fregat-M (14A14B)	LC-1S, Vostochny	Meteor-M No.2-1, 32 microsatellites				Success
Weather satellite, commercial microsatellite launches.
	10 July 2019, 17:14	Soyuz-2-1v / Volga (14A15)	LC-43/4, Plesetsk	Kosmos 2535/Kosmos 2536/Kosmos 2537/Kosmos 2538				Success
Reconnaissance satellites
	20 July 2019, 16:28:20	Soyuz-FG (11A511U-FG)	LC-1/5, Baikonur	Soyuz MS-13				Success
Piloted flight with three cosmonauts. ISS Expedition 60/61.
	30 July 2019, 05:56	Soyuz-2.1a / Fregat-M (14A14A)	LC-43/4, Plesetsk	Meridian 8				Success
Military Communications satellite
	31 July 2019, 12:10:46	Soyuz-2.1a (14A14A)	LC-31/6, Baikonur	Progress MS-12 / 73P				Success
ISS logistics
	22 August 2019, 03:38:32	Soyuz-2.1a (14A14A)	LC-31/6, Baikonur	Soyuz MS-14				Success
Qualification flight to ISS without crew of launching the Soyuz MS spacecraft using the Soyuz-2.1a launch vehicle.
	25 September 2019, 13:57:43	Soyuz-FG (11A511U-FG)	LC-1/5, Baikonur	Soyuz MS-15				Success
Piloted flight with three cosmonauts. ISS Expedition 61/62. Last flight of the Soyuz-FG variant.
	26 September 2019, 07:46	Soyuz-2.1b / Fregat-M (14A14B)	LC-43/4, Plesetsk	Kosmos 2541 (EKS (Tundra))				Success
Reconnaissance satellite
	25 November 2019, 17:52:03	Soyuz-2-1v / Volga (14A15)	LC-43/4, Plesetsk	Kosmos 2542 / Kosmos 2543				Success
Reconnaissance satellites
	6 December 2019, 09:34:11	Soyuz-2.1a (14A14A)	LC-31/6, Baikonur	Progress MS-13 / 74P				Success
ISS logistics
	11 December 2019, 08:54:48	Soyuz-2.1b / Fregat-M (14A14B)	LC-43/3, Plesetsk	Kosmos 2544 (GLONASS-M)				Success
Navigation satellite
VS-23	18 December 2019, 08:54:20	Soyuz-STA / Fregat-M (14A14A)	ELS, Kourou	CSG-1/CHEOPS				Success
VS-23	Radar Earth observation and exoplanet observation satellites							
