= Aist (satellite) =

Russian Earth Observation Satellites

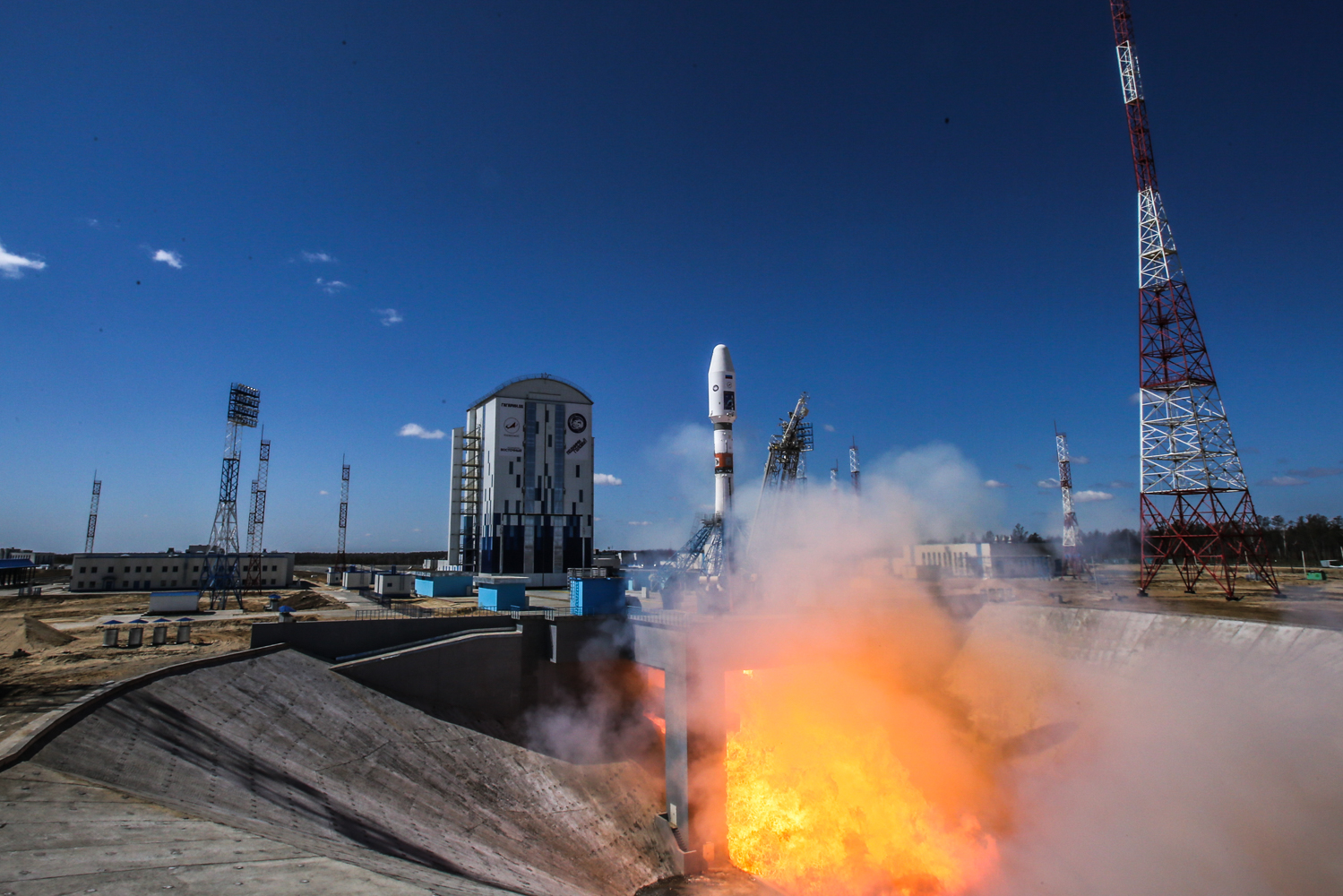
- First Soyuz-2 launch from Vostochny carrying Mikhail Lomonosov, Aist-2D and SamSat-218
- Mission type: Earth observation
- Operator: Roscosmos; Samara National Research University
- Mission duration: 3 years

Spacecraft properties
- Manufacturer: TsSKB-Progress

Start of mission
- Launch date: First: 19 April 2013 (Aist 1 №2); Last (recent): 28 April 2016 (Aist-2D)
- Rocket: Soyuz-2.1v; Soyuz-2.1a; Soyuz-2.1b
- Launch site: Baikonur, Site 31/6; Plesetsk, Site 43/4; Vostochny, Site 1S
- Contractor: Roscosmos

Orbital parameters
- Reference system: Geocentric orbit
- Regime: Sun-synchronous orbit

The Aist (Russian: Аист, meaning "Stork") satellites are a series of Russian microsatellites developed primarily by students, postgraduates, and researchers at Samara National Research University (formerly Samara State Aerospace University, SGAU) in collaboration with TsSKB-Progress (now part of Roscosmos). The Aist program focuses on technology demonstration, Earth remote sensing, and scientific experiments in low Earth orbit (LEO). Initiated in the early 2010s as an educational and cost-effective initiative, the series includes Aist 2, Aist 1, and the more advanced Aist-2D, with follow-on models like Aist-2T planned for future launches.

== Launch history ==
Name	SATCAT	Launch date (UTC)	Launch vehicle	Orbital apsis	Inclination	Period (min)	Status
Aist 1 No.1		28 December 2013	Soyuz-2.1v/Volga				Operational
Aist 1 No.2		19 April 2013	Soyuz-2.1a				Operational
Aist-2D		28 April 2016	Soyuz-2.1a/Volga				Operational
Aist-2T No.1		28 December 2025	Soyuz-2.1b/Fregat-M				Planned
Aist-2T No.2		28 December 2025	Soyuz-2.1b/Fregat-M				Planned
Aist-ST		28 December 2025	Soyuz-2.1b/Fregat-M				Planned

== See also ==
- Roscosmos
