= Kanopus =

Russian Earth observation satellite system

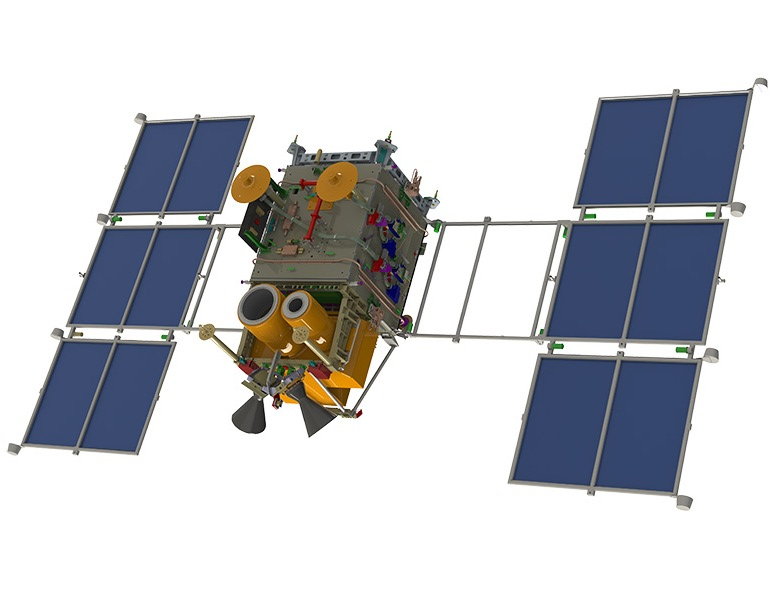
- Image of Kanopus-V Spacecraft
- Mission type: Earth observation
- Operator: Roscosmos (Kanopus-V, V-IK & VO); VKS (Kanopus-ST)
- COSPAR ID: 2018-111A
- SATCAT no.: 43876
- Mission duration: 5 years

Spacecraft properties
- Manufacturer: NPP VNIIEM
- Launch mass: 473 kg (1,043 lb)

Start of mission
- Launch date: First: 22 July 2012 (Kanopus-V №1 & BKA); Last (recent): 27 December 2018 (Kanopus-V №5 & 6)
- Rocket: Soyuz-FG/Fregat; Soyuz-2.1v/Volga; Soyuz-2.1a/Fregat-M
- Launch site: Baikonur, Site 31/6; Plesetsk, Site 43/4; Vostochny, Site 1S
- Contractor: Roscosmos

Orbital parameters
- Reference system: Geocentric orbit
- Regime: Sun-synchronous orbit

Kanopus also known as Canopus, is a series of Russian Earth Observation satellite developed and operated by Roscosmos, primarily through the Research and Production Corporation VNIIEM. The program is designed for real-time monitoring of natural and man-made disasters, environmental changes, agriculture, cartography, and resource management. The Kanopus satellites operate in Sun-synchronous orbits at approximately 500–510 km altitude, offering high-resolution imaging and frequent revisits. The program emphasizes cost-effective, modular designs using the Kanopus bus platform, with contributions from international partners such as Surrey Satellite Technology Ltd (SSTL) of the United Kingdom for avionics and software.

== History ==
The Kanopus program was initiated in the early 2000s to enhance Russia's domestic Earth observation capabilities. The initial design for Kanopus-V (Canopus-B) was proposed by 2008, with a planned mass of 350 kg, which increased to 473 kg by 2011 due to design refinements. Payload capacity was adjusted from 150 kg to 108 kg, power output from 350 W to 300 W, and the operational lifespan reduced from 7 to 5 years. The satellites were configured for a Sun-synchronous orbit at 510–540 km with a 97.4–97.5° inclination to optimize illumination.

Development faced delays due to a 2007 agreement with Belarus to co-develop the BKA satellite, a near-identical copy of Kanopus-V, as a replacement for Belarus's lost BelKA spacecraft. This led to a joint launch in 2012. The program has since expanded to include infrared-capable variants and proposals for radar (Kanopus-R) and cartography (Kanopus-K) models, though some, like Kanopus-VM, were canceled before 2019. As of 2025, the Kanopus constellation supports Russian federal agencies for applications such as forest fire detection, earthquake prediction, and coastal monitoring.

== Variants ==
The Kanopus family of satellites have many variants for several applications:

=== Kanopus-V ===
The baseline model, designed for high-resolution panchromatic and multispectral Earth observation. It features a 2.1 m resolution panchromatic camera (20 km swath) and a 10.5 m resolution multispectral camera (41 km swath). Applications include disaster monitoring, urban planning, and agriculture.

Kanopus-V-IK is the infrared-capable variant modified from Kanopus-V №2 satellite, equipped for thermal imaging. It can detect fire sources as small as 5x5 m over a 2,000 km area.

BKA is the Belarusian variant, nearly identical to Kanopus-V, It is developed under a Russia-Belarus agreement. It is operated by Belarus for national Earth observation purposes.

=== Kanopus-ST ===
Kanopus-ST is an experimental military variant launched in 2015 on a Soyuz-2.1v rocket for submarine tracking and defense-related tests. Details remain limited due to its classified nature.

=== Kanopus-VO ===
Next-generation models with expanded coverage (up to 100 km swath) and improved infrared sensors, planned for enhanced disaster response by 2025–2026.

Other concepts, such as Kanopus-D (detailed observation) and Zond-PP (related platform), have been tested as secondary payloads.

== Launch history ==
Name	SATCAT	Launch date (UTC)	Launch vehicle	Orbital apsis	Inclination	Period (min)	Status
Kanopus-V №1		22 July 2012	Soyuz-FG/Fregat				Operational
BKA №1		22 July 2012	Soyuz-FG/Fregat				Operational
Kanopus-ST (Kosmos 2511)		05 December 2015; 14:08	Soyuz-2.1v/Volga				Failed to Separate
Kanopus-V-IK (Kanopus-V №2)		14 July 2017	Soyuz-2.1a/Fregat				Operational
Kanopus-V №3		01 February 2018	Soyuz-2.1a/Fregat-M				Operational
Kanopus-V №4		01 February 2018	Soyuz-2.1a/Fregat-M				Operational
Kanopus-V №5		27 December 2018	Soyuz-2.1a/Fregat-M				Operational
Kanopus-V №6		27 December 2018	Soyuz-2.1a/Fregat-M				Operational
Kanopus-V №7		2025	Soyuz-2.1a/Fregat-M				Planned
Kanopus-V №8		2025	Soyuz-2.1a/Fregat-M				Planned

== See also ==
- Roscosmos
- Resurs-P
