= List of GLONASS satellites =

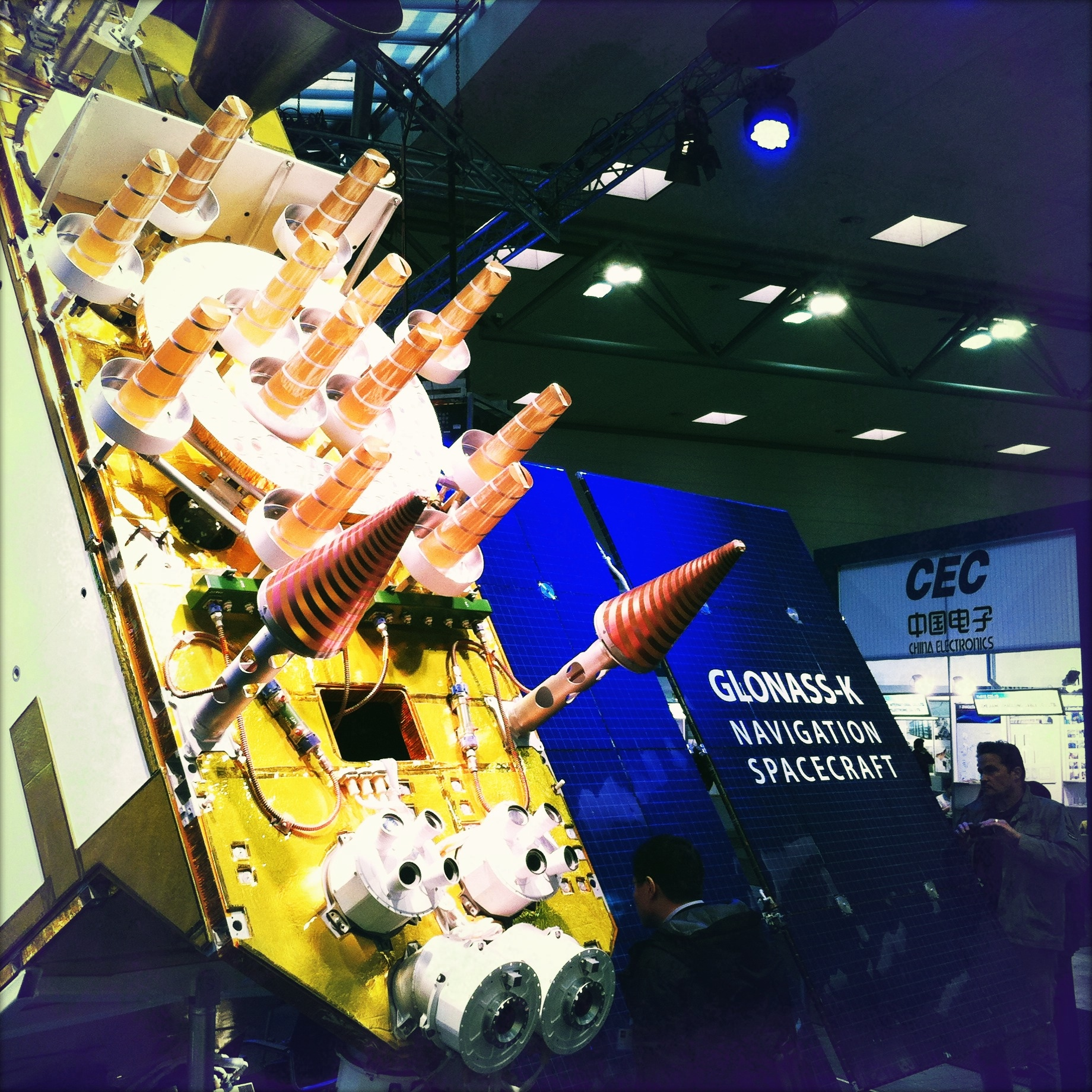
A model of a GLONASS-K satellite displayed at CeBit 2011

As of March 2025, 146 GLONASS navigation satellites have been launched, of which 134 reached the correct orbit and 24 are currently operational.

== Satellites ==
GC number (Ground Control number, Russian: системный номер, номер по наземному комплексу управления) is the spacecraft number in almanac. It only has to be unique during life time of each satellite. Numbers are subject to reuse. Some catalogs mistakenly used GC numbers for historical identification. See notes next to GC numbers.

Satellite	Launch date/time (UTC)	Carrier rocket	Launch site	Launch block	Satellite type	GC number	Orbital plane	Slot	Status / Retirement (Note: Some dates are abandonment dates, some dates are known non-service dates prior to abandonment.)
Kosmos 1413	12 October 1982; 14:57	Proton-K; DM-2	Baikonur, Site 200/39	1	I	711	I	1	12 January 1984
Kosmos 1490	10 August 1983; 18:24	Proton-K; DM-2	Baikonur, Site 200/39	2	I	712	I	3	5 July 1984
Kosmos 1491	10 August 1983; 18:24	Proton-K; DM-2	Baikonur, Site 200/39	2	I	713	I	2	27 September 1984
Kosmos 1519	29 December 1983; 00:52	Proton-K; DM-2	Baikonur, Site 200/39	3	I	714	III	18	27 September 1984
Kosmos 1520	29 December 1983; 00:52	Proton-K; DM-2	Baikonur, Site 200/39	3	I	715	III	17	30 June 1986
Kosmos 1554	19 May 1984; 15:11	Proton-K; DM-2	Baikonur, Site 200/40	4	I	716	III	19	16 August 1985
Kosmos 1555	19 May 1984; 15:11	Proton-K; DM-2	Baikonur, Site 200/40	4	I	717	III	18	25 October 1985
Kosmos 1593	4 September 1984; 15:49	Proton-K; DM-2	Baikonur, Site 200/40	5	I	718	I	2	28 November 1985
Kosmos 1594	4 September 1984; 15:49	Proton-K; DM-2	Baikonur, Site 200/40	5	I	719	I	3	4 September 1986
Kosmos 1650	17 May 1985; 22:28	Proton-K; DM-2	Baikonur, Site 200/39	6	I	720	I	1	8 November 1985
Kosmos 1651	17 May 1985; 22:28	Proton-K; DM-2	Baikonur, Site 200/39	6	IIa	721	I	1	9 August 1987
Kosmos 1710	24 December 1985; 21:43	Proton-K; DM-2	Baikonur, Site 200/39	7	IIa	722	III	18	28 February 1987
Kosmos 1711	24 December 1985; 21:43	Proton-K; DM-2	Baikonur, Site 200/39	7	IIa	723	III	17	16 May 1987
Kosmos 1778	16 September 1986; 11:38	Proton-K; DM-2	Baikonur, Site 200/39	8	IIa	724	I	2	20 February 1987
Kosmos 1779	16 September 1986; 11:38	Proton-K; DM-2	Baikonur, Site 200/39	8	IIa	725	I	3	15 July 1988
Kosmos 1780	16 September 1986; 11:38	Proton-K; DM-2	Baikonur, Site 200/39	8	IIa	726	I	8	15 June 1988
Kosmos 1838	24 April 1987; 12:42	Proton-K; DM-2	Baikonur, Site 200/40	9	IIb	730	—N/a		Wrong orbit
Kosmos 1839	24 April 1987; 12:42	Proton-K; DM-2	Baikonur, Site 200/40	9	IIb	731	—N/a		Wrong orbit
Kosmos 1840	24 April 1987; 12:42	Proton-K; DM-2	Baikonur, Site 200/40	9	IIb	732	—N/a		Wrong orbit
Kosmos 1883	16 September 1987; 02:53	Proton-K; DM-2	Baikonur, Site 200/40	10	IIb	733	III	-	6 June 1989
Kosmos 1884	16 September 1987; 02:53	Proton-K; DM-2	Baikonur, Site 200/40	10	IIb	734	III	-	30 August 1988
Kosmos 1885	16 September 1987; 02:53	Proton-K; DM-2	Baikonur, Site 200/40	10	IIb	735	III	17	1 February 1989
Kosmos 1917	17 February 1988; 00:23	Proton-K; DM-2	Baikonur, Site 200/39	11	IIb	738	—N/a		Wrong orbit
Kosmos 1918	17 February 1988; 00:23	Proton-K; DM-2	Baikonur, Site 200/39	11	IIb	737	—N/a		Wrong orbit
Kosmos 1919	17 February 1988; 00:23	Proton-K; DM-2	Baikonur, Site 200/39	11	IIb	736	—N/a		Wrong orbit
Kosmos 1946	21 May 1988; 17:57	Proton-K; DM-2	Baikonur, Site 200/39	12	IIb	739	I	7	10 May 1990
Kosmos 1947	21 May 1988; 17:57	Proton-K; DM-2	Baikonur, Site 200/39	12	IIb	740	I	8	19 March 1991
Kosmos 1948	21 May 1988; 17:57	Proton-K; DM-2	Baikonur, Site 200/39	12	IIb	741	I	1	11 June 1991
Kosmos 1970	16 September 1988; 02:00	Proton-K; DM-2	Baikonur, Site 200/39	13	IIv	742	III	17	21 May 1990
Kosmos 1971	16 September 1988; 02:00	Proton-K; DM-2	Baikonur, Site 200/39	13	IIv	743	III	18	31 August 1989
Kosmos 1972	16 September 1988; 02:00	Proton-K; DM-2	Baikonur, Site 200/39	13	IIv	744	III	19	1 November 1991
Kosmos 1987	10 January 1989; 02:05	Proton-K; DM-2	Baikonur, Site 200/39	14	IIa	727	I	2	14 March 1993
Kosmos 1988	10 January 1989; 02:05	Proton-K; DM-2	Baikonur, Site 200/39	14	IIv	745	I	3	16 February 1992
Kosmos 2022	31 May 1989; 08:32	Proton-K; DM-2	Baikonur, Site 200/40	15	IIa	728	III	24	25 January 1990
Kosmos 2023	31 May 1989; 08:32	Proton-K; DM-2	Baikonur, Site 200/40	15	IIa	729	III	19	18 November 1989
Kosmos 2079	19 May 1990; 08:32	Proton-K; DM-2	Baikonur, Site 200/40	16	IIv	746	III	17	23 April 1994
Kosmos 2080	19 May 1990; 08:32	Proton-K; DM-2	Baikonur, Site 200/40	16	IIv	751	III	19	27 July 1994
Kosmos 2081	19 May 1990; 08:32	Proton-K; DM-2	Baikonur, Site 200/40	16	IIv	752	III	20	18 August 1992
Kosmos 2109	8 December 1990; 02:43	Proton-K; DM-2	Baikonur, Site 200/40	17	IIv	747	I	7	17 March 1994
Kosmos 2110	8 December 1990; 02:43	Proton-K; DM-2	Baikonur, Site 200/40	17	IIv	748	I	4	29 October 1993
Kosmos 2111	8 December 1990; 02:43	Proton-K; DM-2	Baikonur, Site 200/40	17	IIv	749	I	5	9 June 1996
Kosmos 2139	4 April 1991; 10:47	Proton-K; DM-2	Baikonur, Site 200/39	18	IIv	750	III	22	29 September 1994
Kosmos 2140	4 April 1991; 10:47	Proton-K; DM-2	Baikonur, Site 200/39	18	IIv	753	III	21	6 January 1992
Kosmos 2141	4 April 1991; 10:47	Proton-K; DM-2	Baikonur, Site 200/39	18	IIv	754	III	24	26 February 1992
Kosmos 2177	29 January 1992; 22:19	Proton-K; DM-2	Baikonur, Site 81/23	19	IIv	768	I	3	9 January 1993
Kosmos 2178	29 January 1992; 22:19	Proton-K; DM-2	Baikonur, Site 81/23	19	IIv	769	I	8	23 May 1997
Kosmos 2179	29 January 1992; 22:19	Proton-K; DM-2	Baikonur, Site 81/23	19	IIv	771	I	1	25 October 1996
Kosmos 2204	30 July 1992; 01:59	Proton-K; DM-2	Baikonur, Site 81/23	20	IIv	756	III	18	27 June 1997
Kosmos 2205	30 July 1992; 01:59	Proton-K; DM-2	Baikonur, Site 81/23	20	IIv	772	III	21	29 June 1994
Kosmos 2206	30 July 1992; 01:59	Proton-K; DM-2	Baikonur, Site 81/23	20	IIv	774	III	24	18 May 1996
Kosmos 2234	17 February 1993; 20:09	Proton-K; DM-2	Baikonur, Site 81/23	21	IIv	773	I	2	9 March 1994
Kosmos 2235	17 February 1993; 20:09	Proton-K; DM-2	Baikonur, Site 81/23	21	IIv	759	I	6	30 June 1997
Kosmos 2236	17 February 1993; 20:09	Proton-K; DM-2	Baikonur, Site 81/23	21	IIv	757	I	3	27 July 1997
Kosmos 2275	11 April 1994; 07:49	Proton-K; DM-2	Baikonur, Site 81/23	22	IIv	758	III	18	5 March 1999
Kosmos 2276	11 April 1994; 07:49	Proton-K; DM-2	Baikonur, Site 81/23	22	IIv	760	III	17	30 July 1999
Kosmos 2277	11 April 1994; 07:49	Proton-K; DM-2	Baikonur, Site 81/23	22	IIv	761	III	23	24 July 1997
Kosmos 2287	11 August 1994; 15:27	Proton-K; DM-2	Baikonur, Site 81/23	23	IIv	767	II	12	5 November 1998
Kosmos 2288	11 August 1994; 15:27	Proton-K; DM-2	Baikonur, Site 81/23	23	IIv	770	II	14	24 August 1999
Kosmos 2289	11 August 1994; 15:27	Proton-K; DM-2	Baikonur, Site 81/23	23	IIv	775	II	16	13 August 2000
Kosmos 2294	20 November 1994; 00:39	Proton-K; DM-2	Baikonur, Site 200/39	24	IIv	762	I	4	4 September 1999
Kosmos 2295	20 November 1994; 00:39	Proton-K; DM-2	Baikonur, Site 200/39	24	IIv	763	I	3	27 July 1999
Kosmos 2296	20 November 1994; 00:39	Proton-K; DM-2	Baikonur, Site 200/39	24	IIv	764	I	6	27 October 1999
Kosmos 2307	7 March 1995; 09:23	Proton-K; DM-2	Baikonur, Site 200/39	25	IIv	765	III	20	10 September 1999
Kosmos 2308	7 March 1995; 09:23	Proton-K; DM-2	Baikonur, Site 200/39	25	IIv	766	III	22	21 November 2000
Kosmos 2309	7 March 1995; 09:23	Proton-K; DM-2	Baikonur, Site 200/39	25	IIv	777	III	19	17 July 1997
Kosmos 2316	24 July 1995; 15:52	Proton-K; DM-2	Baikonur, Site 200/39	26	IIv	780	II	15	3 December 1998
Kosmos 2317	24 July 1995; 15:52	Proton-K; DM-2	Baikonur, Site 200/39	26	IIv	781	II	10	24 January 2001
Kosmos 2318	24 July 1995; 15:52	Proton-K; DM-2	Baikonur, Site 200/39	26	IIv	785	II	11	3 February 2001
Kosmos 2323	14 December 1995; 06:10	Proton-K; DM-2	Baikonur, Site 200/39	27	IIv	776	II	9	13 August 2000
Kosmos 2324	14 December 1995; 06:10	Proton-K; DM-2	Baikonur, Site 200/39	27	IIv	778	II	15	29 January 2001
Kosmos 2325	14 December 1995; 06:10	Proton-K; DM-2	Baikonur, Site 200/39	27	IIv	782	II	13	23 July 2001
Kosmos 2362	30 December 1998; 18:35	Proton-K; DM-2	Baikonur, Site 200/39	28	IIv	786	I	7	20 October 2003
Kosmos 2363	30 December 1998; 18:35	Proton-K; DM-2	Baikonur, Site 200/39	28	IIv	784	I	8	19 December 2003
Kosmos 2364	30 December 1998; 18:35	Proton-K; DM-2	Baikonur, Site 200/39	28	IIv	779	I	1	8 July 2002
Kosmos 2374	13 October 2000; 14:12	Proton-K; DM-2	Baikonur, Site 81/24	29	IIv	783	III	18	25 May 2007
Kosmos 2375	13 October 2000; 14:12	Proton-K; DM-2	Baikonur, Site 81/24	29	IIv	787	III	17	12 September 2006
Kosmos 2376	13 October 2000; 14:12	Proton-K; DM-2	Baikonur, Site 81/24	29	IIv	788	III	24	14 December 2005
Kosmos 2380	1 December 2001; 18:04	Proton-K; DM-2	Baikonur, Site 81/24	30	IIv	790	I	6	19 December 2003
Kosmos 2381	1 December 2001; 18:04	Proton-K; DM-2	Baikonur, Site 81/24	30	IIv	789	I	3	25 August 2007
Kosmos 2382	1 December 2001; 18:04	Proton-K; DM-2	Baikonur, Site 81/24	30	III	711	I	5	9 July 2006
Kosmos 2394	25 December 2002; 07:37	Proton-K; DM-2	Baikonur, Site 81/23	31	IIv	791	III	22	7 February 2007
Kosmos 2395	25 December 2002; 07:37	Proton-K; DM-2	Baikonur, Site 81/23	31	IIv	792	III	21	18 November 2007
Kosmos 2396	25 December 2002; 07:37	Proton-K; DM-2	Baikonur, Site 81/23	31	IIv	793	III	23	23 September 2005
Kosmos 2402	10 December 2003; 13:53	Proton-K; Briz-M	Baikonur, Site 81/24	32	IIv	794	I	2	19 April 2007
Kosmos 2403	10 December 2003; 13:53	Proton-K; Briz-M	Baikonur, Site 81/24	32	IIv	795	I	4	1 May 2009
Kosmos 2404	10 December 2003; 13:53	Proton-K; Briz-M	Baikonur, Site 81/24	32	M	701	I	6	18 June 2009
Kosmos 2411	26 December 2004; 13:53	Proton-K; DM-2	Baikonur, Site 200/39	33	IIv	796	I	1	4 May 2008
Kosmos 2412	26 December 2004; 13:53	Proton-K; DM-2	Baikonur, Site 200/39	33	IIv	797	I	8	16 June 2008
Kosmos 2413	26 December 2004; 13:53	Proton-K; DM-2	Baikonur, Site 200/39	33	M	712	I	7	22 November 2012
Kosmos 2417	25 December 2005; 05:07	Proton-K; DM-2	Baikonur, Site 81/24	34	IIv	798	III	22	9 July 2007
Kosmos 2418	25 December 2005; 05:07	Proton-K; DM-2	Baikonur, Site 81/24	34	M	713	III	24	2 November 2009
Kosmos 2419	25 December 2005; 05:07	Proton-K; DM-2	Baikonur, Site 81/24	34	M	714	III	17	24 February 2016
Kosmos 2424	25 December 2006; 20:18	Proton-K; DM-2	Baikonur, Site 81/24	35	M	715	II	14	26 June 2017
Kosmos 2425	25 December 2006; 20:18	Proton-K; DM-2	Baikonur, Site 81/24	35	M	716	II	15	20 July 2021
Kosmos 2426	25 December 2006; 20:18	Proton-K; DM-2	Baikonur, Site 81/24	35	M	717	II	10	1 August 2019
Kosmos 2431	26 October 2007; 07:35	Proton-K; DM-2	Baikonur, Site 81/24	36	M	718	III	17	29 November 2010
Kosmos 2432	26 October 2007; 07:35	Proton-K; DM-2	Baikonur, Site 81/24	36	M	719	III	28	2 September 2026
Kosmos 2433	26 October 2007; 07:35	Proton-K; DM-2	Baikonur, Site 81/24	36	M	720	III	25	Flight Testing
Kosmos 2434	25 December 2007; 19:32	Proton-M; DM-2	Baikonur, Site 81/24	37	M	721	II	13	Operational
Kosmos 2435	25 December 2007; 19:32	Proton-M; DM-2	Baikonur, Site 81/24	37	M	722	II	14	12 October 2011
Kosmos 2436	25 December 2007; 19:32	Proton-M; DM-2	Baikonur, Site 81/24	37	M	723	II	10	Operational - No L2 Signal
Kosmos 2442	25 September 2008; 08:49	Proton-M; DM-2	Baikonur, Site 81/24	38	M	724	III	18	12 February 2014
Kosmos 2443	25 September 2008; 08:49	Proton-M; DM-2	Baikonur, Site 81/24	38	M	725	III	21	8 July 2016
Kosmos 2444	25 September 2008; 08:49	Proton-M; DM-2	Baikonur, Site 81/24	38	M	726	III	22	28 November 2012
Kosmos 2447	25 December 2008; 10:43	Proton-M; DM-2	Baikonur, Site 81/24	39	M	727	I	3	28 November 2012
Kosmos 2448	25 December 2008; 10:43	Proton-M; DM-2	Baikonur, Site 81/24	39	M	728	I	2	16 October 2013
Kosmos 2449	25 December 2008; 10:43	Proton-M; DM-2	Baikonur, Site 81/24	39	M	729	I	8	9 September 2012
Kosmos 2456	14 December 2009; 10:38	Proton-M; DM-2	Baikonur, Site 81/24	40	M	730	I	1	Operational
Kosmos 2457	14 December 2009; 10:38	Proton-M; DM-2	Baikonur, Site 81/24	40	M	733	I	6	25 December 2025
Kosmos 2458	14 December 2009; 10:38	Proton-M; DM-2	Baikonur, Site 81/24	40	M	734	I	5	6 August 2018
Kosmos 2459	1 March 2010; 21:19	Proton-M; DM-2	Baikonur, Site 81/24	41	M	731	III	22	10 March 2021
Kosmos 2460	1 March 2010; 21:19	Proton-M; DM-2	Baikonur, Site 81/24	41	M	732	III	23	Flight Testing
Kosmos 2461	1 March 2010; 21:19	Proton-M; DM-2	Baikonur, Site 81/24	41	M	735	III	22	10 November 2022
Kosmos 2464	2 September 2010; 00:53	Proton-M; DM-2	Baikonur, Site 81/24	42	M	736	II	16	3 December 2022
Kosmos 2465	2 September 2010; 00:53	Proton-M; DM-2	Baikonur, Site 81/24	42	M	737	II	12	21 November 2016
Kosmos 2466	2 September 2010; 00:53	Proton-M; DM-2	Baikonur, Site 81/24	42	M	738	II	16	15 February 2016
—N/a	5 December 2010; 10:25	Proton-M; DM-03	Baikonur, Site 81/24	43	M	739	—N/a		Failed to orbit
—N/a	5 December 2010; 10:25	Proton-M; DM-03	Baikonur, Site 81/24	43	M	740	—N/a		Failed to orbit
—N/a	5 December 2010; 10:25	Proton-M; DM-03	Baikonur, Site 81/24	43	M	741	—N/a		Failed to orbit
Kosmos 2471	26 February 2011; 03:07	Soyuz-2.1b; Fregat-M	Plesetsk, Site 43/4	K1S	K1	701 (Note: Known is some catalogs as 701K.)	III	20	12 November 2021 (Note: Kosmos 2471, the first GLONASS-K1, operated in test mode only, with its signal flagged as "unhealthy". In addition, the satellite provided active Cospas-Sarsat search and rescue service.)
Kosmos 2474	2 October 2011; 20:15	Soyuz-2.1b; Fregat-M	Plesetsk, Site 43/4	45S	M	742	I	4	26 August 2019
Kosmos 2475	4 November 2011; 12:51	Proton-M; Briz-M	Baikonur, Site 81/24	44	M	743	I	8	Flight Testing
Kosmos 2476	4 November 2011; 12:51	Proton-M; Briz-M	Baikonur, Site 81/24	44	M	744	I	3	Operational
Kosmos 2477	4 November 2011; 12:51	Proton-M; Briz-M	Baikonur, Site 81/24	44	M	745	I	7	Operational
Kosmos 2478	28 November 2011; 08:25	Soyuz-2.1b; Fregat-M	Plesetsk, Site 43/4	46S	M	746	III	17	13 April 2015 (Note: Restored the system to fully operational for the first time since late 1995.)
Kosmos 2485	26 April 2013; 05:23	Soyuz-2.1b; Fregat-M	Plesetsk, Site 43/4	47S	M	747	I	2	Operational
—N/a	2 July 2013; 02:38	Proton-M; DM-03	Baikonur, Site 81/24	47	M	748	—N/a		Failed to orbit
—N/a	2 July 2013; 02:38	Proton-M; DM-03	Baikonur, Site 81/24	47	M	749	—N/a		Failed to orbit
—N/a	2 July 2013; 02:38	Proton-M; DM-03	Baikonur, Site 81/24	47	M	750	—N/a		Failed to orbit
Kosmos 2494	23 March 2014; 22:54	Soyuz-2.1b; Fregat-M	Plesetsk, Site 43/4	48S	M	754	III	18	Operational
Kosmos 2500	14 June 2014; 17:16	Soyuz-2.1b; Fregat-M	Plesetsk, Site 43/4	49S	M	755 (Note: Include L3OC signal.)	III	21	Operational
Kosmos 2501	30 November 2014; 21:52	Soyuz-2.1b; Fregat-M	Plesetsk, Site 43/4	K2S	K1	702 (Note: Known is some catalogs as 702K.)	II	9	Operational (Note: Kosmos 2501, second GLONASS-K1, also provides Cospas-Sarsat search and rescue service.)
Kosmos 2514	7 February 2016; 00:21	Soyuz-2.1b; Fregat-M	Plesetsk, Site 43/4	50S	M	751	III	17	Operational
Kosmos 2516	29 May 2016; 08:44	Soyuz-2.1b; Fregat-M	Plesetsk, Site 43/4	51S	M	753	II	11	November 2020
Kosmos 2522	22 September 2017; 00:02	Soyuz-2.1b; Fregat-M	Plesetsk, Site 43/4	52S	M	752	II	14	Operational
Kosmos 2527	17 June 2018; 21:46	Soyuz-2.1b; Fregat-M	Plesetsk, Site 43/4	53S	M	756	I	5	Operational
Kosmos 2529	3 November 2018; 20:17	Soyuz-2.1b; Fregat-M	Plesetsk, Site 43/4	54S	M	757	II	15	Operational
Kosmos 2534	27 May 2019; 06:23	Soyuz-2.1b; Fregat-M	Plesetsk, Site 43/4	55S	M	758	II	12	Operational
Kosmos 2544	11 December 2019; 08:54	Soyuz-2.1b; Fregat-M	Plesetsk, Site 43/3	56S	M	759	I	4	Operational
Kosmos 2545	16 March 2020; 18:28	Soyuz-2.1b; Fregat-M	Plesetsk, Site 43/4	57S	M	760	III	24	Operational
Kosmos 2547	25 October 2020; 19:08	Soyuz-2.1b; Fregat-M	Plesetsk, Site 43/3	58S	K1	705	II	11	Operational
Kosmos 2557	7 July 2022; 09:18	Soyuz-2.1b; Fregat	Plesetsk, Site 43/4	59S	K1	706	III	22	Operational
Kosmos 2559	10 October 2022; 02:52	Soyuz-2.1b; Fregat	Plesetsk, Site 43/3	60S	K1	707	III	19	Operational
Kosmos 2564	28 November 2022; 15:13	Soyuz-2.1b Fregat	Plesetsk, Site 43/3	61S	M	761	II	16	Operational
Kosmos 2569	7 August 2023; 13:19:25	Soyuz-2.1b; Fregat	Plesetsk; 43/3	62S	K2	703	I	8	Operational
Kosmos 2584	2 March 2025; 22:22	Soyuz-2.1b; Fregat	Plesetsk; 43/3	63S	K2	704	I	6	Operational
Kosmos 2595	13 September 2025; 02:10	Soyuz-2.1b; Fregat	Plesetsk; 43/3	63S	K1	708	III	20	Operational
Kosmos 2619	24 August 2026; 02:10	Soyuz-2.1b; Fregat	Plesetsk; 43/3	63S	K1	713	III	23	Operational

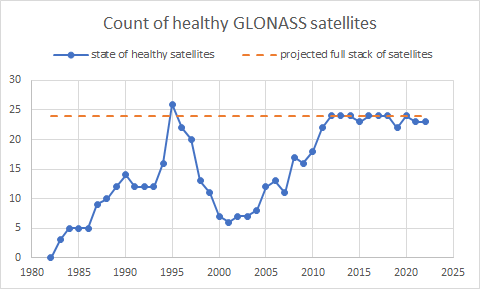
Count of healthy GLONASS satellites

=== Satellites by version ===
Version	Launched	Operational	Not used	Retired	Lost at launch	Remarks
Uragan Block I	10	0	0	10	0	
Uragan Block IIa	9	0	0	9	0	
Uragan Block IIb	12	0	0	6	6	
Uragan Block IIv	56	0	0	56	0	
Uragan Block III	1	0	0	1	0	
Uragan-M	51	19	1	25	6	
Uragan-K	6	5	0	1	0	Launches continuing
Uragan-K2	2	1	1	0	0	Launches continuing
Total	147	25	2	108	12	

=== Orbital slots ===
GC numbers refer to currently active satellites. GC numbers in parentheses refer to non-operational satellites under testing or in reserve.
Refer to Official GLONASS web page for the most up-to-date information.

Slot	Plane		
Slot	I	II	III
1/9/17	730	702	751
2/10/18	747	723	754
3/11/19	744	705	707
4/12/20	759	758	708
5/13/21	756	721	755
6/14/22	704	752	706
7/15/23	745	757	732
8/16/24	743	761	760

== Planned launches ==
Date	Rocket	Launch site	Satellite type	GC #	Manufacturer #	Remarks
2026	Soyuz-2.1b / Fregat-M	Plesetsk	GLONASS-K2		No.24L	
2026	Soyuz-2.1b / Fregat-M	Plesetsk	GLONASS-K		No.19L	Operational
2026	Soyuz-2.1b / Fregat-M	Plesetsk	GLONASS-K		No.20L	
2026	Soyuz-2.1b / Fregat-M	Plesetsk	GLONASS-K		No.21L	
2026	Soyuz-2.1b / Fregat-M	Plesetsk	GLONASS-K		No.22L	
2026	Soyuz-2.1b / Fregat-M	Plesetsk	GLONASS-K		No.23L	
2026	Soyuz-2.1b / Fregat-M	Plesetsk	GLONASS-K2		No.25L	
2027	Soyuz-2.1b / Fregat-M	Plesetsk	GLONASS-K2		No.26	
2027	Soyuz-2.1b / Fregat-M	Plesetsk	GLONASS-K2		No.27	
2028	Soyuz-2.1b / Fregat-M	Plesetsk	GLONASS-K2		No.28	
2028	Soyuz-2.1b / Fregat-M	Plesetsk	GLONASS-K2		No.29	
2028	Soyuz-2.1b / Fregat-M	Plesetsk	GLONASS-K2		No.30	
2028	Soyuz-2.1b / Fregat-M	Plesetsk	GLONASS-V		No.11L	First of six satellites in highly elliptical orbits.
2028	Soyuz-2.1b / Fregat-M	Plesetsk	GLONASS-V		No.12L	
2028	Angara A5 / DM-03	Plesetsk or Vostochny	GLONASS-V × 2		No.13L, No.14L	
2028	Angara A5 / DM-03	Plesetsk or Vostochny	GLONASS-V × 2		No.15L, No.16L	
2029	Soyuz-2.1b / Fregat-M	Plesetsk	GLONASS-K2		No.31	
2029	Soyuz-2.1b / Fregat-M	Plesetsk	GLONASS-K2		No.32	
2029	Soyuz-2.1b / Fregat-M	Plesetsk	GLONASS-K2		No.33	
2030	Soyuz-2.1b / Fregat-M	Plesetsk	GLONASS-K2		No.34	
2030	Soyuz-2.1b / Fregat-M	Plesetsk	GLONASS-K2		No.35	
2030	Soyuz-2.1b / Fregat-M	Plesetsk	GLONASS-K2		No.36	
2030–2033	Soyuz-2.1b / Fregat-M or Angara A5 / DM-03	Plesetsk or Vostochny	GLONASS-K2 × 1 or GLONASS-K2 × 2		No.37-No.54	

== See also ==
- List of BeiDou satellites
- List of Galileo satellites
- List of GPS satellites
- List of NAVIC satellites
