= Aist 1 =

Russian technology demonstration satellite

- Mission type: Technology
- Operator: Samara Aerospace University
- COSPAR ID: 2013-078C
- SATCAT no.: 39492

Spacecraft properties
- Spacecraft type: Aist
- Manufacturer: Samara Aerospace University; TsSKB Progress

Start of mission
- Launch date: 28 December 2013, 12:30:00 UTC
- Rocket: Soyuz-2-1v/Volga
- Launch site: Plesetsk 43/4

Orbital parameters
- Reference system: Geocentric
- Regime: Low Earth
- Perigee altitude: 600 kilometres (370 mi)
- Apogee altitude: 631 kilometres (392 mi)
- Inclination: 82.42 degrees
- Period: 96.87 minutes
- Epoch: 25 January 2015, 03:53:46 UTC

Aist 1 (Russian: Аист 1, meaning Stork 1) is a Russian technology demonstration satellite which was launched in December 2013. Aist 1 is operated by the Samara Aerospace University, who constructed it in partnership with TsSKB Progress. It is the second launched Aist satellite, following Aist 2's April 2013 launch.

== Satellite ==
Aist1's primary technological mission objectives are demonstrating its systems and bus and investigating how to minimize acceleration caused by microgravitational effects. It will also measure micrometeoroid and microscopic orbital debris impacts, and test new sensors and techniques designed to study Earth's magnetic field.

Aist 1 was launched aboard the maiden flight of TsSKB Progress' Volga upper stage equipped Soyuz-2-1v carrier rocket, from Plesetsk Cosmodrome Site 43 at 12:30 UTC on 28 December 2013, following a series of delays. The same rocket also deployed two SKRL-756 radar calibration satellites. Aist separated from the upper stage at 14:10 UTC, 100 minutes after liftoff.
