= Kosmos 2516 =

Russian navigation satellite

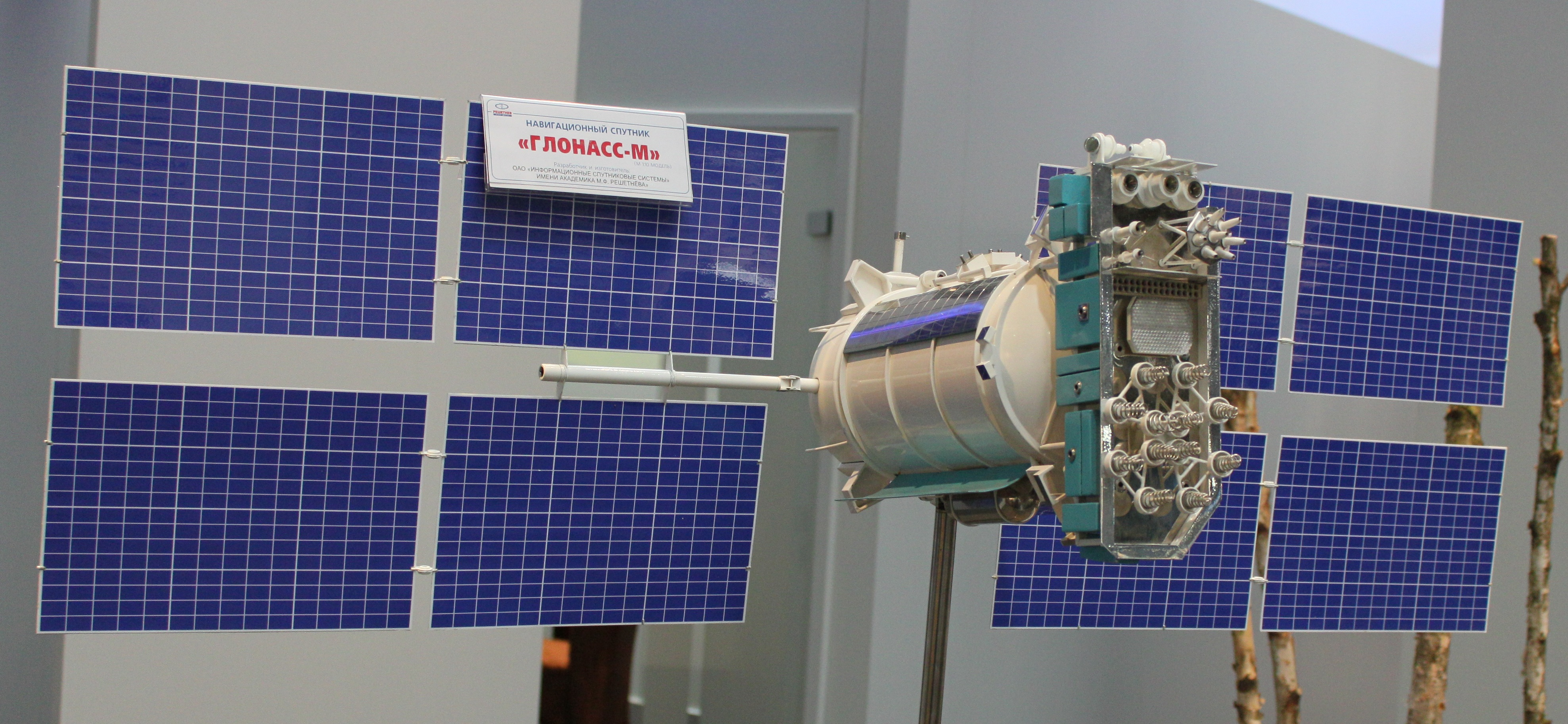
- Glonass-M satellite model
- Mission type: Navigation
- Operator: Russian Aerospace Defence Forces
- COSPAR ID: 2016-032A
- SATCAT no.: 41554
- Website: GLONASS status
- Mission duration: Planned: 7 years Actual: 4 years, 5 months

Spacecraft properties
- Spacecraft: GLONASS No. 753
- Spacecraft type: Uragan-M
- Manufacturer: Reshetnev ISS
- Launch mass: 1,414 kilograms (3,117 lb)
- Dry mass: 250 kg
- Dimensions: 1.3 metres (4 ft 3 in) diameter

Start of mission
- Launch date: May 29, 2016, 08:44 UTC
- Rocket: Soyuz-2.1b/Fregat
- Launch site: Plesetsk 43/4
- Contractor: Russian Aerospace Defence Forces

End of mission
- Last contact: November 2020

Orbital parameters
- Reference system: Geocentric
- Regime: Medium Earth orbit
- Semi-major axis: 25,508 km (15,850 mi)
- Eccentricity: 0.0011362
- Perigee altitude: 19,159 km (11,905 mi)
- Apogee altitude: 19,101 km (11,869 mi)
- Inclination: 64.70 degrees
- Period: 675.7 minutes
- Epoch: 30 January 2017

Kosmos 2516 (Russian: Космос 2516 meaning Space 2516) is a Russian military satellite launched in 2016 as part of the GLONASS satellite navigation system.

This satellite is a GLONASS-M satellite, also known as Uragan-M, and is numbered Uragan-M No. 753.

Kosmos 2516 was launched from Site 43/4 at Plesetsk Cosmodrome in northern Russia. A Soyuz-2-1b carrier rocket with a Fregat upper stage was used to perform the launch which took place at 08:44 UTC on 29 May 2016. The launch successfully placed the satellite into a Medium Earth orbit. It subsequently received its Kosmos designation, and the international designator 2016-032A. The United States Space Command assigned it the Satellite Catalog Number 41554.

The satellite is in orbital plane 2, in orbital slot 11.

Kosmos 2516 experienced a depressurization event in November 2020, which permanently disabled the satellite after four years in service. GLONASS-K 15 (No. 705), launched on 25 October 2020, was repurposed as its replacement.

== See also ==
- 2016 in spaceflight
- List of Kosmos satellites (2501–2750)
- List of R-7 launches (2015–19)
