= List of Kosmos satellites (2501–2750) =

The designation Kosmos (Russian: Космос meaning Cosmos) is a generic name given to a large number of Soviet Union, and subsequently Russian, satellites, the first of which was launched in 1962. Satellites given Kosmos designations include military spacecraft, failed probes to the Moon and the planets, prototypes for crewed spacecraft, and scientific spacecraft. This is a list of satellites with Kosmos designations between 2501 and 2750.

Designation	Type	Launch date (UTC)	Carrier rocket	Function	Decay	Remarks
Kosmos 2501	GLONASS-K1 702K	30 November 2014; 21:52	Soyuz-2.1b/Fregat	Navigation	in orbit	
Kosmos 2502	Lotos-S1 No.1 (802)	25 December 2014; 03:01	Soyuz-2.1b	ELINT	in orbit	
Kosmos 2503	Bars-M 1L	27 February 2015; 11:01	Soyuz-2.1a	Cartography/Reconnaissance	in orbit	
Kosmos 2504	Unknown	31 March 2015; 13:47	Rokot/Briz-KM 11A05	Undisclosed	in orbit	Possible ASAT or close satellite monitoring test.
Kosmos 2505	Kobalt-M №10	5 June 2015; 15:23	Soyuz-2.1a	Optical surveillance	in orbit	
Kosmos 2506	Persona	23 June 2015; 16:44	Soyuz-2.1b	Reconnaissance	in orbit	
Kosmos 2507	Strela-3M 13	23 September 2015; 21:59	Rokot-KM	Military communications	in orbit	3 satellites in 1 launch
Kosmos 2508	Strela-3M 14	23 September 2015; 21:59	Rokot-KM	Military communications	in orbit	3 satellites in 1 launch
Kosmos 2509	Strela-3M 15	23 September 2015; 21:59	Rokot-KM	Military communications	in orbit	3 satellites in 1 launch
Kosmos 2510	EKS-1 (Tundra 11L)	17 November 2015; 06:33	Soyuz-2.1b / Fregat-M	Missile early warning	in orbit	
Kosmos 2511	Kanopus-ST	5 December 2015; 14:08	Soyuz-2-1v/Volga	Earth observation	failed to separate	2 satellites in 1 launch
Kosmos 2512	KYuA-1	5 December 2015; 14:08	Soyuz-2-1v/Volga	Radar calibration	in orbit	2 satellites in 1 launch
Kosmos 2513	Garpun-12L	15 December 2015; 11:03	Proton-M/Briz-M	Military communications	in orbit	
Kosmos 2514	GLONASS-M 751	7 February 2016; 03:21	Soyuz-2.1b/Fregat	Navigation	in orbit	
Kosmos 2515	Bars-M 2L	24 March 2016; 09:42	Soyuz-2.1a	Cartography/Reconnaissance	in orbit	
Kosmos 2516	GLONASS-M 753	29 May 2016; 03:21	Soyuz-2.1b/Fregat	Navigation	in orbit	
Kosmos 2517	Geo-IK-2 (Geo-IK-2 12L)	4 June 2016; 14:00	Rokot/Briz-KM	Geodesy	in orbit	
Kosmos 2518	EKS-2 (Tundra 12L)	25 May 2017; 06:33	Soyuz-2.1b / Fregat-M	Missile early warning	in orbit	
Kosmos 2519	Napryazhenie / 14F150 / Nivelir	23 June 2017; 18:04	Soyuz-2.1v / Volga	Undisclosed. Presumedly military geodesy	23 December 2021	
Kosmos 2520	Blagovest-11L	16 August 2017; 22:07	Proton-M / Briz-M	Military communications	in orbit	
Kosmos 2521	Sputnik Inspektor	23 June 2017; 18:04	Soyuz-2.1v / Volga	Undisclosed	12 September 2019	Deployed from Kosmos 2519
Kosmos 2522	GLONASS-M 752	22 September 2017; 00:02:32	Soyuz-2.1b/Fregat	Navigation	in orbit	
Kosmos 2523	Unknown	23 June 2017; 18:04	Soyuz-2.1v / Volga	Undisclosed	in orbit	Deployed from Kosmos 2519
Kosmos 2524	Lotos-S1 No.2 (803)	2 December 2017; 10:43:26	Soyuz-2.1b	ELINT	in orbit	
Kosmos 2525	EMKA	29 March 2018; 16:45	Soyuz-2.1v	Earth Observation	1 April 2021	Breakup occurred at about 4:43 GMT over the South Pacific Ocean
Kosmos 2526	Blagovest-12L	18 April 2018; 22:12	Proton-M / Briz-M	Military communications	in orbit	
Kosmos 2527	GLONASS-M 756	16 June 2018; 21:30	Soyuz-2.1b/Fregat	Navigation	in orbit	
Kosmos 2528	Lotos-S1 No.3 (804)	25 October 2018; 00:15	Soyuz-2.1b	ELINT	in orbit	
Kosmos 2529	GLONASS-M 757	3 November 2018; 20:17	Soyuz-2.1b/Fregat	Navigation	in orbit	
Kosmos 2530	Strela-3M 16	23 November 2018; 02:27	Rokot-KM	Military communications	in orbit	3 satellites in 1 launch
Kosmos 2531	Strela-3M 17	23 November 2018; 02:27	Rokot-KM	Military communications	in orbit	3 satellites in 1 launch
Kosmos 2532	Strela-3M 18	23 November 2018; 02:27	Rokot-KM	Military communications	in orbit	3 satellites in 1 launch
Kosmos 2533	Blagovest-13L	21 December 2018; 00:20	Proton-M	Military communications	in orbit	
Kosmos 2534	GLONASS-M 758	27 May 2019; 06:23	Soyuz-2.1b/Fregat-M	Navigation	in orbit	
Kosmos 2535	14F150 No.2 / Nivelir-L (speculated)	10 July 2019; 18:04	Soyuz-2.1v / Volga	Undisclosed. Presumedly military geodesy	in orbit	4 classified military satellites in 1 launch. Kosmos 2535 separated into 10+ trackable objects Aug 2019.
Kosmos 2536	14F150 No.2 / Nivelir-L (speculated)	10 July 2019; 18:04	Soyuz-2.1v / Volga	Undisclosed. Presumedly military geodesy	in orbit	4 classified military satellites in 1 launch. Kosmos 2535 separated into 10+ trackable objects Aug 2019.
Kosmos 2537	14F150 No.2 / Nivelir-L (speculated)	10 July 2019; 18:04	Soyuz-2.1v / Volga	Undisclosed. Presumedly military geodesy	7 October 2023	4 classified military satellites in 1 launch. Kosmos 2535 separated into 10+ trackable objects Aug 2019.
Kosmos 2538	14F150 No.2 / Nivelir-L (speculated)	10 July 2019; 18:04	Soyuz-2.1v / Volga	Undisclosed. Presumedly military geodesy	in orbit	4 classified military satellites in 1 launch. Kosmos 2535 separated into 10+ trackable objects Aug 2019.
Kosmos 2539	Blagovest-14L	5 August 2019; 21:56	Proton-M	Military communications	in orbit	Initial deployment of the Blagovest constellation completed.
Kosmos 2540	Geo-IK-2 No.3 (Musson 2)	30 August 2019; 14:00	Rokot / Briz-KM	Geodesy	in orbit	Penultimate flight of Rokot
Kosmos 2541	EKS-3 (Tundra 13L)	26 September 2019; 07:43	Soyuz-2.1b / Fregat-M	Missile early warning	in orbit	
Kosmos 2542	Unknown	25 November 2019; 17:52	Soyuz-2.1v / Volga	Undisclosed. Possible satellite inspection	24 October 2023; 10:07	
Kosmos 2543	Unknown	25 November 2019; 17:52	Soyuz-2.1v / Volga	Undisclosed. Possible satellite inspection	in orbit	Deployed from Kosmos 2542. Claimed by US Space Force to have performed a weapons test in July 2020
Kosmos 2544	GLONASS-M 759	11 December 2019; 08:54	Soyuz-2.1b/Fregat-M	Navigation	in orbit	
Kosmos 2545	GLONASS-M 760	16 March 2020; 21:28	Soyuz-2.1b/Fregat-M	Navigation	in orbit	
Kosmos 2546	EKS-4 (Tundra 14L)	22 May 2020; 10:31	Soyuz-2.1b / Fregat-M	Missile early warning	in orbit	First EKS satellite identified jamming GPS
Kosmos 2547	GLONASS-K 705	25 October 2020; 19:08	Soyuz-2.1b/Fregat-M	Navigation	in orbit	
Kosmos 2548	ERA 1	3 December 2020; 01:14	Soyuz-2.1b/Fregat-M	Technology	in orbit	Cubesat of undisclosed size launched with 3 Gonets communication satellites as a piggyback payload, reportedly to test advanced microsystems of orientation and astronavigation.
Kosmos 2549	Lotos-S1 №4	2 February 2021; 20:45	Soyuz-2.1b	ELINT	in orbit	
Kosmos 2550	Pion-NKS №1	25 June 2021; 19:50	Soyuz-2.1b	SIGINT	in orbit	
Kosmos 2551	EO MKA №1	9 September 2021; 19:59	Soyuz-2.1v / Volga	Reconnaissance	20 Oct 2021	Broke up over American Mid West at 12:43 a.m. EDT on 20 October 2021.
Kosmos 2552	EKS-5 (Tundra 15L)	25 November 2021; 01:09	Soyuz-2.1b / Fregat	Early warning	in orbit	
Kosmos 2553	Neitron №1	5 February 2022; 07:00	Soyuz-2.1a / Fregat	Reconnaissance	in orbit	
Kosmos 2554	Lotos-S1 №5	7 April 2022; 11:20	Soyuz-2.1b	ELINT	in orbit	
Kosmos 2555	EO MKA №2	29 April 2022; 19:55	Angara 1.2	Military	18 May 2022	It decayed on 18 May 2022 after no orbit-raising maneuvers were performed, indicating a possible spacecraft failure.
Kosmos 2556	Bars-M 3L	19 May 2022; 08:03	Soyuz-2.1a	Cartography/Reconnaissance	in orbit	
Kosmos 2557	GLONASS-K 16L	7 July 2022; 09:18	Soyuz-2.1b / Fregat	Navigation	in orbit	
Kosmos 2558	14F150 Nivelir №3	1 August 2022 20:25	Soyuz-2.1v / Volga	Surveillance	in orbit	
Kosmos 2559	GLONASS-K 17L	10 October 2022; 02:52	Soyuz-2.1b / Fregat	Navigation	in orbit	
Kosmos 2560	EO MKA №3	15 October 2022; 22:55	Angara 1.2	Military	10 Dec 2022; 01:54 UTC	
Kosmos 2561	MKA №1 (?)	21 October 2022; 19:20	Soyuz-2.1v	Surveillance	in orbit	Launched with Kosmos 2562.
Kosmos 2562	MKA №2 (?)	21 October 2022; 19:20	Soyuz-2.1v	Surveillance	8 November 2023	Launched with Kosmos 2561. Likely inspected Resurs-P No.3 in November 2022. Decayed on 8 November 2023.
Kosmos 2563	EKS-6 (Tundra 16L)	2 November 2022 06:48	Soyuz-2.1b / Fregat	Early warning	in orbit	
Kosmos 2564	GLONASS-M 761	28 November 2022 15:13	Soyuz-2.1b / Fregat	Navigation	in orbit	
Kosmos 2565	Lotos-S1 №6	30 November 2022 21:10	Soyuz-2.1b	ELINT	in orbit	Carried Kosmos 2566.
Kosmos 2566	Unknown	30 November 2022 21:10	Soyuz-2.1b	Undisclosed	in orbit	Released in-orbit by Kosmos 2565 on 3 December 2022.
Kosmos 2567	Bars-M 4L	23 March 2023 06:40	Soyuz-2.1a	Reconnaissance	in orbit	
Kosmos 2568	EO MKA №4	29 March 2023 19:57	Soyuz-2.1v	Military	3 January 2025	
Kosmos 2569	GLONASS-K2 13L (K2 №1)	8 August 2023 13:20	Soyuz-2.1b / Fregat	Navigation	in orbit	First GLONASS-K2 satellite.
Kosmos 2570	Lotos-S1 №7	27 October 2023 06:04	Soyuz-2.1b	ELINT	in orbit	Carried a secondary payload (Kosmos 2571) released a few days after the launch.
Kosmos 2571	unknown	27 October 2023 06:04	Soyuz-2.1b	unknown	in orbit	Launched with Kosmos 2570, detached a few days after the launch.
Kosmos 2572	Razdan 1	25 November 2023 20:58	Soyuz-2.1b	Reconnaissance	in orbit	
Kosmos 2573	Bars-M 5L	21 December 2023 08:48	Soyuz-2.1a	Reconnaissance	in orbit	
Kosmos 2574	Razbeg №1	27 December 2023 07:33	Soyuz-2.1v	Reconnaissance	11 November 2025	
Kosmos 2575	Razbeg №2	9 January 2024 07:33	Soyuz-2.1v	Reconnaissance	in orbit	
Kosmos 2576	Nivelir-L №4	16 May 2024 21:21	Soyuz-2.1b / Fregat	Surveillance	in orbit	
Kosmos 2577	OO MKA №1	17 September 2024; 07:00	Angara-1.2	Reconnaissance	in orbit	2 satellites in 1 launch
Kosmos 2578	OO MKA №2	17 September 2024; 07:00	Angara-1.2	Reconnaissance	in orbit	2 satellites in 1 launch
Kosmos 2579	Bars-M 6L	31 October 2024 07:51:31	Soyuz 2.1a	Reconnaissance	in orbit	
Kosmos 2580	Lotos-S1 №8	4 December 2024 18:03	Soyuz-2.1b	ELINT	in orbit	
Kosmos 2581	MKA B1	5 February 2025; 03:00	Soyuz-2-1v / Volga	TBA	in orbit	3 satellites in 1 launch
Kosmos 2582	MKA B2	5 February 2025; 03:00	Soyuz-2-1v / Volga	TBA	in orbit	3 satellites in 1 launch
Kosmos 2583	MKA B3	5 February 2025; 03:00	Soyuz-2-1v / Volga	TBA	in orbit	3 satellites in 1 launch
Kosmos 2584	GLONASS-K2 14L (K2 №2)	2 March 2025 22:22	Soyuz-2.1b / Fregat-M	Navigation	in orbit	
Kosmos 2585	Strela-3M №19	15 March 2025; 10:50	Angara-1.2	Military communications	in orbit	3 satellite in 1 launch
Kosmos 2586	Strela-3M №20	15 March 2025; 10:50	Angara-1.2	Military communications	in orbit	3 satellite in 1 launch
Kosmos 2587	Strela-3M №21	15 March 2025; 10:50	Angara-1.2	Military communications	in orbit	3 satellite in 1 launch
Kosmos 2588	Nivelir-L №5	23 May 2025; 08:36	Soyuz-2.1b / Fregat-M	Military technology	in orbit	
Kosmos 2589	14F166A №1	19 June 2025; 03:00	Angara A5 / Briz-M	TBA	in orbit	
Kosmos 2590	14F166A Subsat 1	19 June 2025; 03:00	Angara A5 / Briz-M	TBA	in orbit	
Kosmos 2591	OO MKA №3	21 August 2025; 09:32	Angara-1.2	Reconnaissance	in orbit	
Kosmos 2592	OO MKA №4	21 August 2025; 09:32	Angara-1.2	Reconnaissance	in orbit	
Kosmos 2593	OO MKA №5	21 August 2025; 09:32	Angara-1.2	Reconnaissance	in orbit	
Kosmos 2594	OO MKA №6	21 August 2025; 09:32	Angara-1.2	Reconnaissance	in orbit	
Kosmos 2595	GLONASS-K 18L (K1 №6)	13 September 2025; 02:30	Soyuz-2.1b/Fregat-M	Navigation	in orbit	
Kosmos 2596	Mozhaets-6	13 September 2025; 02:30	Soyuz-2.1b/Fregat-M	TBA	in orbit	
Kosmos 2597	Strela-3M №22	25 November 2025; 13:42	Angara-1.2	Military communications	in orbit	3 satellite in 1 launch
Kosmos 2598	Strela-3M №23	25 November 2025; 13:42	Angara-1.2	Military communications	in orbit	3 satellite in 1 launch
Kosmos 2599	Strela-3M №24	25 November 2025; 13:42	Angara-1.2	Military communications	in orbit	3 satellite in 1 launch
Kosmos 2600	EO MKA №7	5 February 2026; 18:59	Soyuz-2.1b/Fregat-M	TBA	in orbit	
Kosmos 2601	RU UNK A1	5 February 2026; 18:59	Soyuz-2.1b/Fregat-M	TBA	in orbit	
Kosmos 2602	RU UNK A2	5 February 2026; 18:59	Soyuz-2.1b/Fregat-M	TBA	in orbit	
Kosmos 2603	RU UNK A3	5 February 2026; 18:59	Soyuz-2.1b/Fregat-M	TBA	in orbit	
Kosmos 2604	RU UNK A4	5 February 2026; 18:59	Soyuz-2.1b/Fregat-M	TBA	in orbit	
Kosmos 2605	RU UNK A5	5 February 2026; 18:59	Soyuz-2.1b/Fregat-M	TBA	in orbit	
Kosmos 2606	RU UNK A6	5 February 2026; 18:59	Soyuz-2.1b/Fregat-M	TBA	in orbit	
Kosmos 2607	RU UNK A7	5 February 2026; 18:59	Soyuz-2.1b/Fregat-M	TBA	in orbit	
Kosmos 2608	RU UNK A8	5 February 2026; 18:59	Soyuz-2.1b/Fregat-M	TBA	in orbit	

== See also ==
- List of USA satellites
