= Blagovest (satellite) =

Russian military satellite system

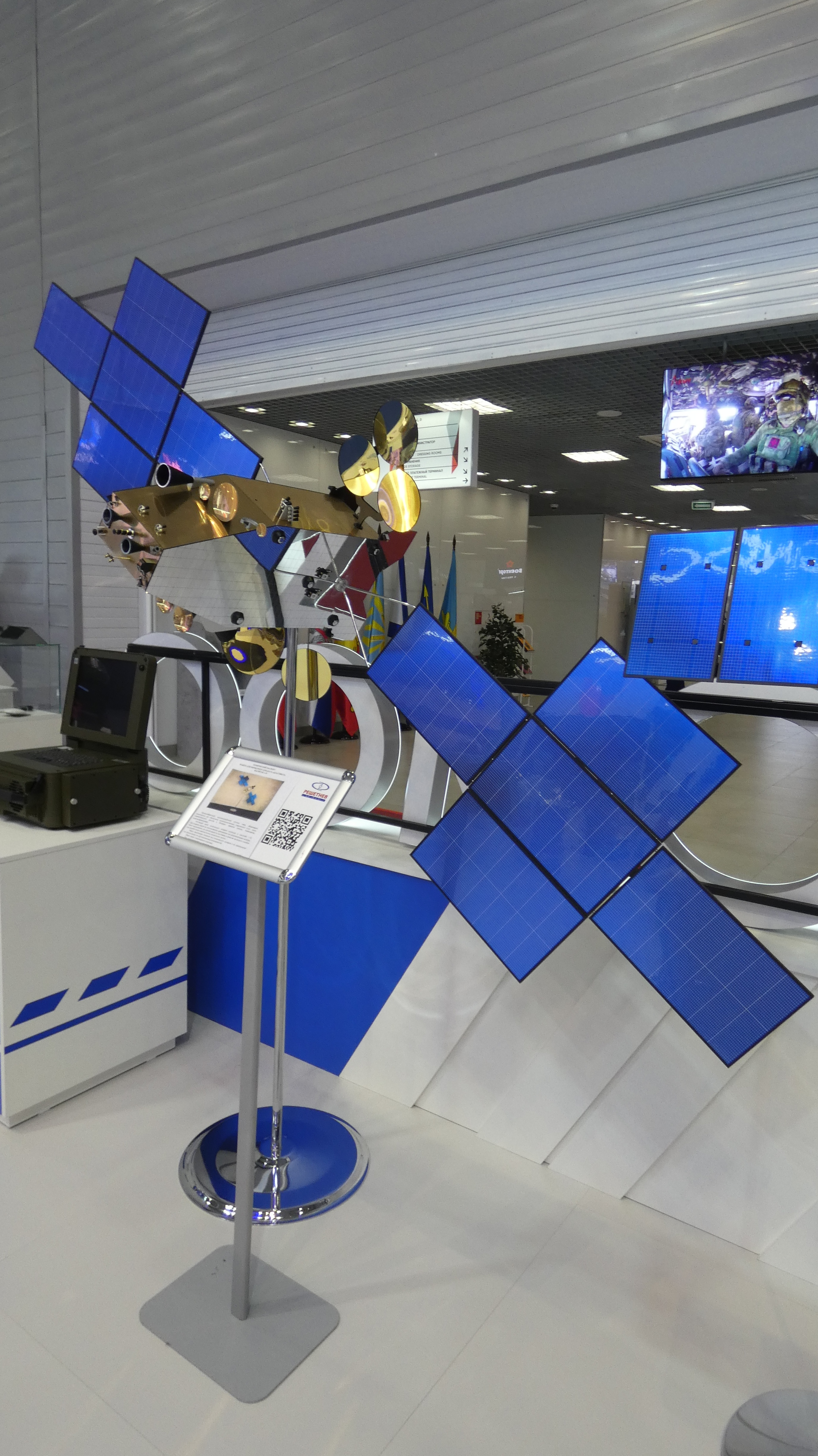
Scale model at the "Armiya 2021" exhibition.

Blagovest satellites (technical identifier 14F149) form a constellation of four geostationary satellites to support Russian Armed Forces communications.

The satellites have Ka and Q band transponders, and provide high-speed internet, telephony, and other services. They were manufactured by ISS Reshetnev, and are based on the Ekspress-2000 bus featuring two deployable solar arrays with five panels on each. The design life is 15 years.

The first satellite Kosmos 2520/Blagovest-11L was launched on 16 August 2017, Kosmos 2526/Blagovest 12L on 18 April 2018, Kosmos 2533/Blagovest 13L on 21 December 2018, with the fourth (Kosmos 2539/Blagovest-14L) launched on 5 August 2019, using a Proton-M carrier rocket with Briz-M orbital insertion module. All four were launched from the Baikonur Cosmodrome Site 81 Pad 24.

== System ==
Blagovest satellites transmit data from Russian reconnaissance drones and radar stations to missile and artillery units. To guide precision weapons like Geran-4 und Geran-5 or cruise missiles to their targets, vast amounts of data must be transmitted. Satellites provide the bandwidth required for this.

The satellites are controlled from the Dubna satellite communication center near Moscow, which is Russia’s largest civilian and military facility of its kind. It serves as the primary hub for the distribution of broadband data and the uplinking of strategic signals to the geostationary satellite fleet. In June 2026, the facility became the target of a major Ukrainian drone attack.

Source
Satellite	Launched on	Carrier rocket / Orbital insertion module	COSPAR	Position	Status
Blagovest 1	16 August 2017	Proton-M / Briz-M	2017-046A	46° est	OK
Blagovest 2	18 April 2018	Proton-M / Briz-M	2018-037A	49° est	OK
Blagovest 3	21 December 2018	Proton-M / Briz-M	2018-107A	52° est	OK
Blagovest 4	5 August 2019	Proton-M / Briz-M	2019-048A	55° est	OK
