= Kosmos 2522 =

Russian military satellite

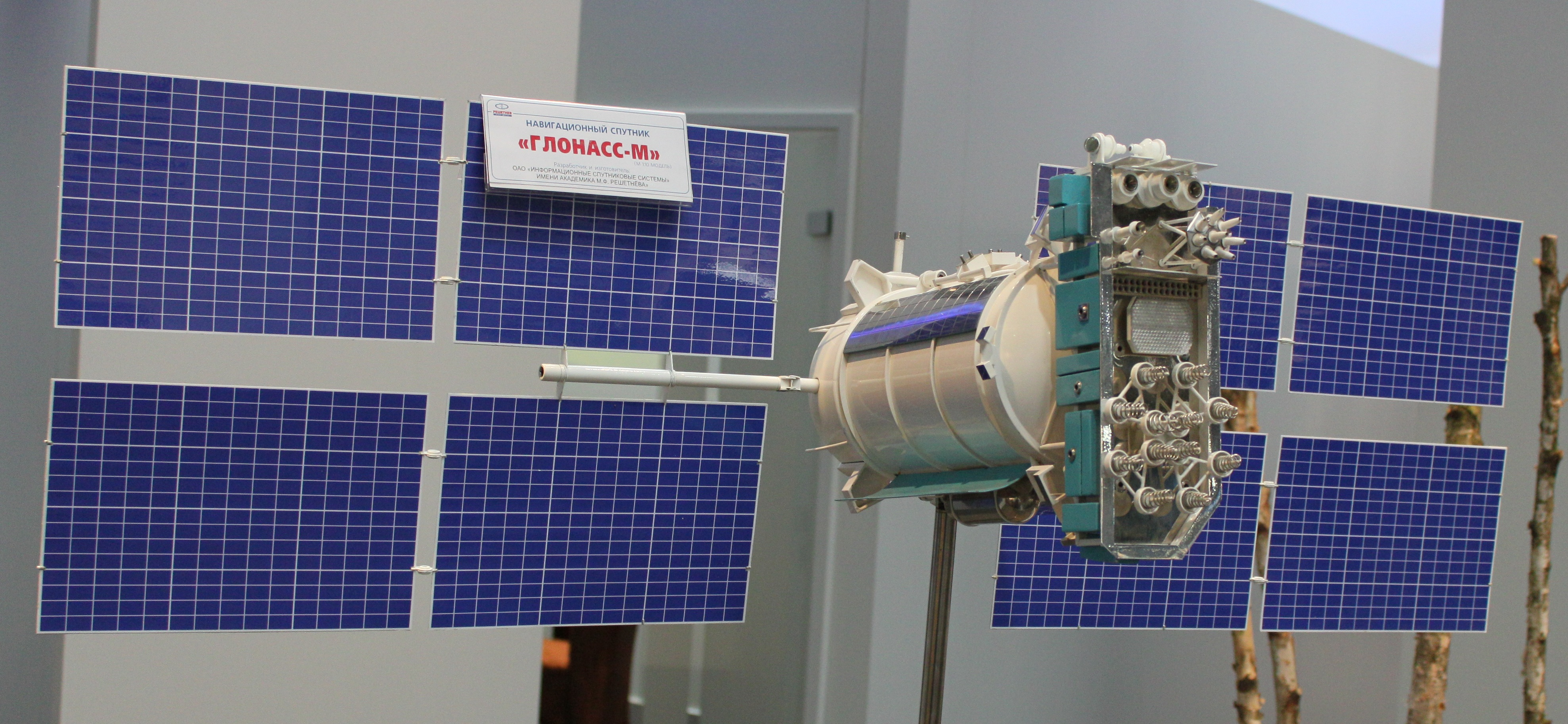
- Glonass-M satellite model
- Mission type: Navigation
- Operator: Russian Aerospace Defence Forces
- COSPAR ID: 2017-055A
- SATCAT no.: 42939
- Website: GLONASS status

Spacecraft properties
- Spacecraft: GLONASS No. 752
- Spacecraft type: Uragan-M
- Manufacturer: Reshetnev ISS
- Launch mass: 1,414 kilograms (3,117 lb)
- Dry mass: 250 kg
- Dimensions: 1.3 metres (4 ft 3 in) diameter

Start of mission
- Launch date: September 22, 2017, 00:02 UTC
- Rocket: Soyuz-2.1b/Fregat
- Launch site: Plesetsk 43/4
- Contractor: Russian Aerospace Defence Forces

Orbital parameters
- Reference system: Geocentric
- Regime: Medium Earth orbit
- Semi-major axis: 25,508 km (15,850 mi)
- Eccentricity: 0.0005100
- Perigee altitude: 19,150 km (11,900 mi)
- Apogee altitude: 19,124 km (11,883 mi)
- Inclination: 64.71 degrees
- Period: 675.7 minutes
- Epoch: 31 March 2018

Kosmos 2522 (Russian: Космос 2522 meaning Space 2522) is a Russian military satellite launched in 2017 as part of the GLONASS satellite navigation system.

This satellite is a GLONASS-M satellite, also known as Uragan-M, and is numbered Uragan-M No. 752.

Kosmos 2522 was launched from Site 43/4 at Plesetsk Cosmodrome in northern Russia. A Soyuz-2-1b carrier rocket with a Fregat upper stage was used to perform the launch which took place at 00:02 UTC on 22 September 2017. The launch successfully placed the satellite into a Medium Earth orbit. It subsequently received its Kosmos designation, and the international designator 2017-055A. The United States Space Command assigned it the Satellite Catalog Number 42939.

The satellite is in orbital plane 2, in orbital slot 14. As of March 2018 it remains in operation.

== See also ==
- 2017 in spaceflight
- List of Kosmos satellites (2501–2750)
- List of R-7 launches (2015–19)
