= Kosmos 2514 =

Russian navigation satellite

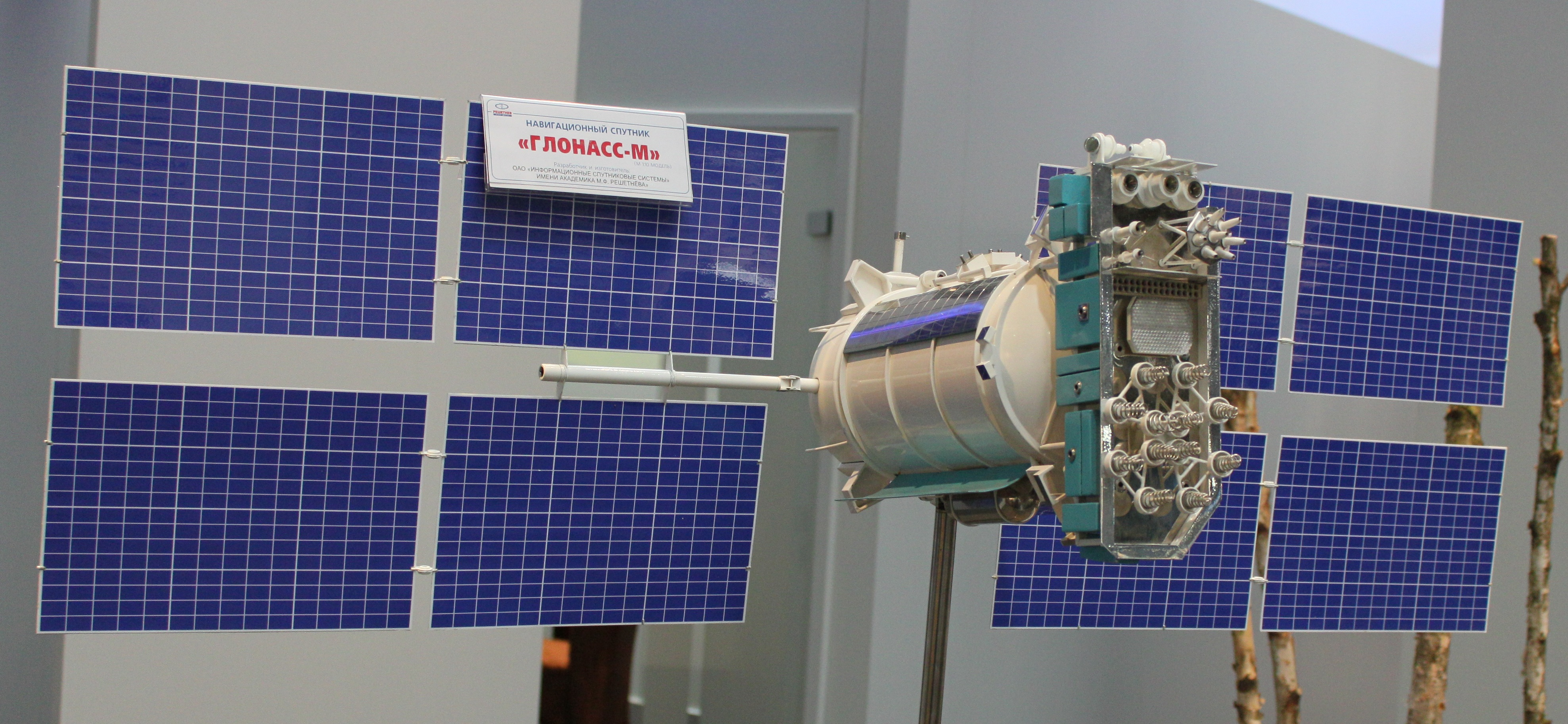
- Glonass-M satellite model
- Mission type: Navigation
- Operator: Russian Aerospace Defence Forces
- COSPAR ID: 2016-008A
- SATCAT no.: 41330
- Website: GLONASS status

Spacecraft properties
- Spacecraft: GLONASS No. 751
- Spacecraft type: Uragan-M
- Manufacturer: Reshetnev ISS
- Launch mass: 1,414 kilograms (3,117 lb)
- Dry mass: 250 kg
- Dimensions: 1.3 metres (4 ft 3 in) diameter

Start of mission
- Launch date: February 7, 2016, 00:21 UTC
- Rocket: Soyuz-2.1b/Fregat
- Launch site: Plesetsk 43/4
- Contractor: Russian Aerospace Defence Forces

Orbital parameters
- Reference system: Geocentric
- Regime: Medium Earth orbit
- Semi-major axis: 25,508 km (15,850 mi)
- Eccentricity: 0.0010
- Perigee altitude: 19,164 km (11,908 mi)
- Apogee altitude: 19,111 km (11,875 mi)
- Inclination: 64.81 degrees
- Period: 675.7 minutes
- Epoch: 12 March 2016

Kosmos 2514 (Russian: Космос 2514 meaning Space 2514) is a Russian military satellite launched in 2016 as part of the GLONASS satellite navigation system.

This satellite is a GLONASS-M satellite, also known as Uragan-M, and is numbered Uragan-M No. 751.

Kosmos 2514 was launched from Site 43/4 at Plesetsk Cosmodrome in northern Russia. A Soyuz-2-1b carrier rocket with a Fregat upper stage was used to perform the launch which took place at 00:21 UTC on 7 February 2016. The launch successfully placed the satellite into a Medium Earth orbit. It subsequently received its Kosmos designation, and the international designator 2016-008A. The United States Space Command assigned it the Satellite Catalog Number 41330.

The satellite is in orbital plane 3, in orbital slot 17. As of March 2016 it remains in operation.

== See also ==
- 2016 in spaceflight
- List of Kosmos satellites (2501–2750)
- List of R-7 launches (2015–19)
