= Kosmos 2529 =

Russian navigation satellite

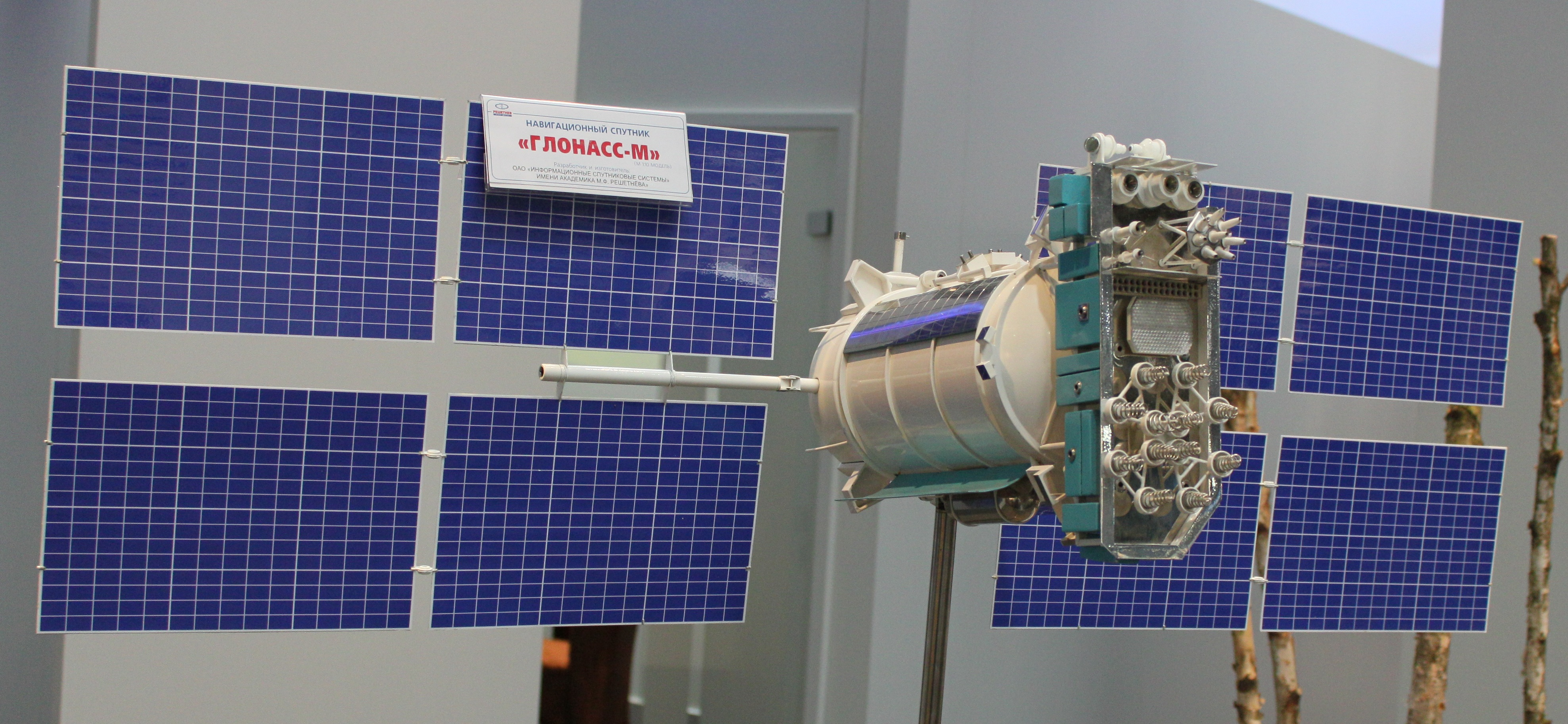
- Glonass-M satellite model
- Mission type: Navigation
- Operator: Russian Aerospace Defence Forces
- COSPAR ID: 2018-086A
- SATCAT no.: 43687
- Website: GLONASS status

Spacecraft properties
- Spacecraft: GLONASS No. 757
- Spacecraft type: Uragan-M
- Manufacturer: Reshetnev ISS
- Launch mass: 1,414 kilograms (3,117 lb)
- Dry mass: 250 kg
- Dimensions: 1.3 metres (4 ft 3 in) diameter

Start of mission
- Launch date: November 3, 2018, 20:17 UTC
- Rocket: Soyuz-2.1b/Fregat
- Launch site: Plesetsk 43/4
- Contractor: Russian Aerospace Defence Forces

Orbital parameters
- Reference system: Geocentric
- Regime: Medium Earth orbit
- Semi-major axis: 25,507 km (15,849 mi)
- Eccentricity: 0.0006485
- Perigee altitude: 19,120 km (11,880 mi)
- Apogee altitude: 19,153 km (11,901 mi)
- Inclination: 64.71 degrees
- Period: 675.7 minutes
- Epoch: 8 December 2018

Kosmos 2529 (Russian: Космос 2529 meaning Space 2529) is a Russian military satellite launched in 2018 as part of the GLONASS satellite navigation system.

This satellite is a GLONASS-M satellite, also known as Uragan-M, and is numbered Uragan-M No. 757.

Kosmos 2527 was launched from Site 43/4 at Plesetsk Cosmodrome in northern Russia. A Soyuz-2-1b carrier rocket with a Fregat upper stage was used to perform the launch which took place at 20:17 UTC on 3 November 2018. The launch successfully placed the satellite into a Medium Earth orbit. It subsequently received its Kosmos designation, and the international designator 2018-086A. The United States Space Command assigned it the Satellite Catalog Number 43687.

The satellite is in orbital plane 2, in orbital slot 7. As of December 2018 it remains in operation.

== See also ==
- 2018 in spaceflight
- List of Kosmos satellites (2501–2750)
- List of R-7 launches (2015–19)
