= Kosmos 2524 =

Russian reconnaissance satellite

- Names: Lotos-S1
- Mission type: Reconnaissance
- Operator: Russian Armed Forces
- COSPAR ID: 2017-076A
- SATCAT no.: 43032
- Mission duration: 7 years, 3 months and 24 days

Spacecraft properties
- Spacecraft: Lotos-S1
- Bus: Yantar
- Manufacturer: TsSKB Progress; KB Arsenal

Start of mission
- Launch date: December 2, 2017 10:43 UTC
- Rocket: Soyuz 2-1B
- Launch site: Plesetsk Cosmodrome Site 43

Orbital parameters
- Reference system: Geocentric
- Semi-major axis: 7,282 km (4,525 mi)
- Periapsis altitude: 905.0 km (562.3 mi)
- Apoapsis altitude: 917.1 km (569.9 mi)
- Inclination: 67.1°
- Period: 103.1 minutes

Kosmos 2524 is a Russian reconnaissance satellite part of its ELINT Liana program. Developed and built by TsSKB Progress and KB Arsenal, it was launched on December 2, 2017. It is based on the Yantar satellite's bus.

== Launch ==
Despite the launch failure of another Soyuz 2-1B rocket just four days before, Kosmos 2524 launched on December 2, 2017, from Plesetsk Cosmodrome Site 43 at 10:43 UTC. It was launched to a low Earth orbit with a periapsis of 905.0 km (562.3 mi), an apoapsis of 917.1 km (569.9 mi) and an inclination of 67.1°, allowing it to cover much of the world.
