= Vostochny Cosmodrome Site 1S =

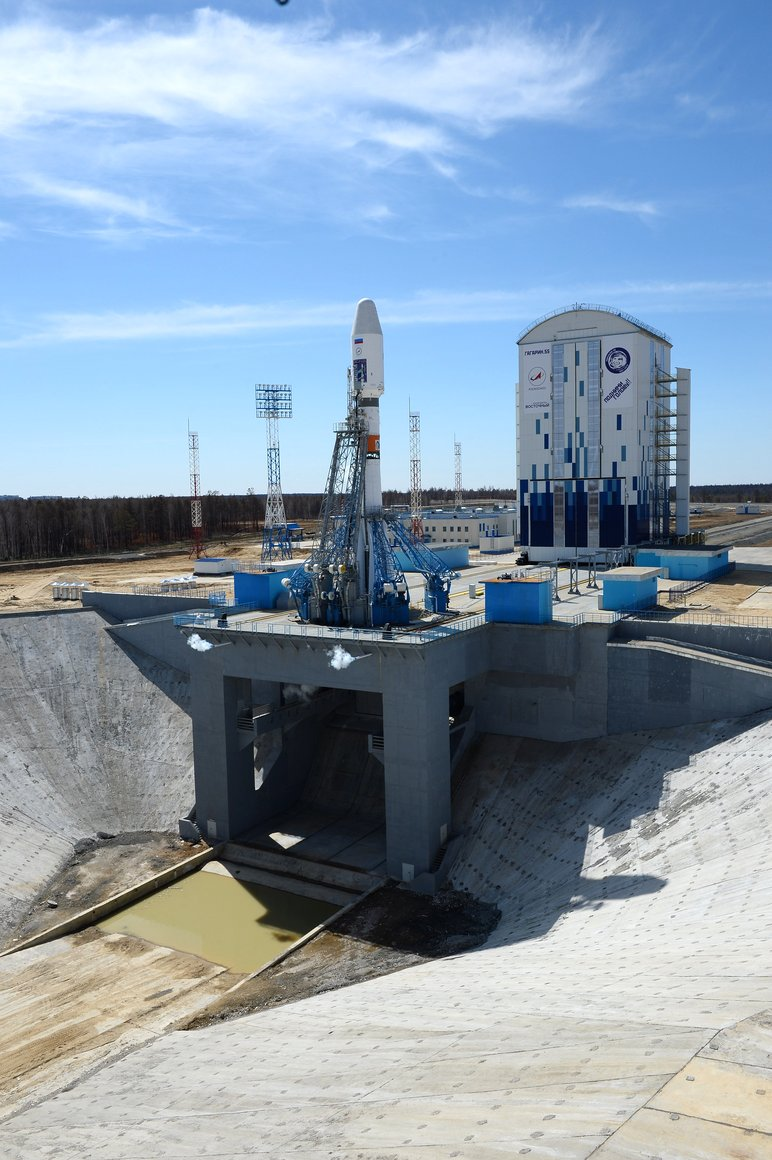
- Soyuz-2.1a at site 1S on 27 April 2016
- Interactive map of Vostochny Cosmodrome Site 1S
- Launch site: Vostochny Cosmodrome
- Coordinates: 51°52′58″N 128°19′58″E
- Operator: Roscosmos
- Launch pad: One
Launch history
- Status: Active
- Launches: 21
- First launch: 28 April 2016; Soyuz-2.1a / Volga; Mikhailo Lomonosov
- Last launch: 14 November 2026; Soyuz-2.1b / Fregat; MKA Kinosputnik, KOEN and others
- Associated rockets: Soyuz-2 (active)

The Vostochny Cosmodrome Site 1S (Russian: Площадка-1С) is a launch complex at the Vostochny Cosmodrome in Russia. It consists of a single pad for use by the Soyuz-2 launch vehicles.

On 28 April 2016, the first launch from the Vostochny Cosmodrome took place from this pad. The third launch took place on 1 February 2018. The Meteor M2-2 mission, the fifth launch from this site, took place 5 July 2019. Since December 2020, Arianespace uses this site to launch OneWeb satellites, with 6 batches launched between December 2020 and October 2021.

== Launch history ==
No.	Date/Time (UTC)	Type	Serial-no.	Payload	Orbit	Outcome
1	28-04-2016; 02:01	Soyuz-2.1a / Volga	R15000-001	MVL-300; Aist-2D; SamSat 218	LEO	Success
2	28-11-2017; 05:41	Soyuz-2.1b / Fregat-M	N15000-001	Meteor-M No.2-1; Baumanets 2 LEO Vantage 2 IDEA-OSG 1 AISSat-3; Corvus-BC 3 Lemur-2 × 10; D-Star One; SEAM	LEO	Failure
3	01-02-2018; 02:07	Soyuz-2.1a / Fregat-M	N15000-002	Kanopus-V No.3; Kanopus-V No.4; S-Net 1-4; Lemur-2 × 4 D-Star One v1.1 Phoenix	LEO	Success
4	27-12-2018; 02:07	Soyuz-2.1a / Fregat-M	Ya15000-003	Kanopus-V No.5; Kanopus-V No.6; GRUS-1; ZACube-2; Lume-1; Lemur-2 × 8 D-Star One iSat; D-Star One Sparrow; UWE-4; Flock-3k × 12	LEO	Success
5	05-07-2019; 05:41	Soyuz-2.1b / Fregat-M	Ya15000-002	Meteor-M 2-2; EXOCONNECT; El Camino Real; Move-IIb	SSO	Success
6	18-12-2020; 12:26	Soyuz-2.1b / Fregat	V15000-004	OneWeb × 36	LEO	Success
7	25-03-2021; 02:47	Soyuz-2.1b / Fregat	V15000-005	OneWeb × 36	LEO	Success
8	25-04-2021; 22:14	Soyuz-2.1b / Fregat	V15000-006	OneWeb × 36	LEO	Success
9	28-05-2021; 17:38	Soyuz-2.1b / Fregat	V15000-007	OneWeb × 36	LEO	Success
10	01-07-2021; 12:48	Soyuz-2.1b / Fregat	Kh15000-008	OneWeb × 36	LEO	Success
11	14-10-2021; 09:40	Soyuz-2.1b / Fregat	Kh15000-009	OneWeb × 36	LEO	Success
12	22-10-2022 19:57	Soyuz-2.1b / Fregat	Kh15000-011	Gonets-M 23/24/25 (33L/34L/35L), Skif-D	LEO	Success
13	26-05-2023 21:14	Soyuz-2.1a / Fregat	В15000-004	Kondor-FKA №1	SSO	Success
14	27-06-2023 11:34	Soyuz-2.1b / Fregat	Kh15000-010	Meteor-M №2-3; 42 rideshare satellites	SSO	Success
15	10-08-2023 23:10	Soyuz-2.1b / Fregat	V15000-003	Luna 25 (Luna-Glob lander)	TLI	Success
16	29-02-2024 05:43	Soyuz-2.1b / Fregat	S15000-012	Meteor-M No.2-4; 18 rideshare satellites	SSO	Success
17	04-11-2024 23:18	Soyuz-2.1b / Fregat	S15000-013	Ionosfera-M №1; Ionosfera-M №2; 53 rideshare satellites	SSO	Success
18	29-11-2024 21:50	Soyuz-2.1a / Fregat	S15000-005	Kondor-FKA №2	SSO	Success
19	25-07-2025 05:54	Soyuz-2.1b / Fregat	K15000-015	Ionosfera-M №3; Ionosfera-M №4; 18 rideshare satellites	SSO	Success
20	28-12-2025 13:18	Soyuz-2.1b / Fregat	A15000-071	Aist-2T No.1; Aist-2T No.2; 50 rideshares satellites	SSO	Success
21	14-11-2026 01:16	Soyuz-2.1b / Fregat	A15000-072	MKA Kinosputnik, KOEN and others	SSO	Success
