= Soyuz 2.1v =

Russian expendable carrier rocket

Soyuz‑2.1v
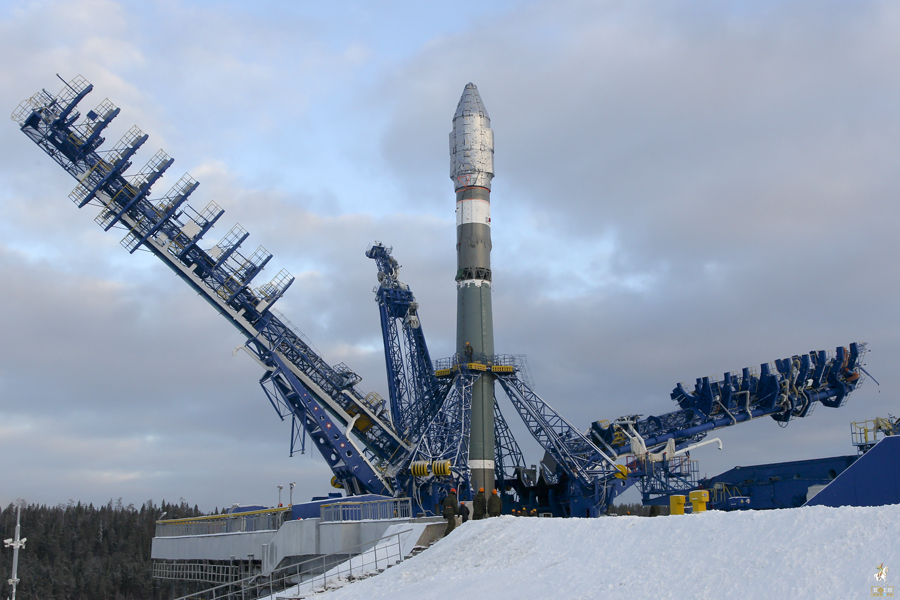
- Soyuz‑2.1v prepared for the launch of the Kosmos 2511 and 2512 military satellites in December 2015
- Function: Small-lift launch vehicle
- Manufacturer: RKTs Progress
- Country of origin: Russia

Size
- Height: 44 m (144 ft)
- Diameter: 3 m (9.8 ft)
- Mass: 158,000 kg (348,000 lb)
- Stages: 2

Capacity

Payload to LEO
- Altitude: 200 km (120 mi)
- Orbital inclination: 51.8°
- Mass: 2,850 kg (6,280 lb)

Payload to LEO
- Altitude: 200 km (120 mi)
- Orbital inclination: 62.8°
- Mass: 2,800 kg (6,200 lb)

Associated rockets
- Family: R-7 (Soyuz)
- Based on: Soyuz-2
- Comparable: Long March 2C; PSLV

Launch history
- Status: Retired
- Launch sites: Plesetsk, Site 43/4
- Total launches: 13
- Success(es): 12
- Partial failure: 1
- First flight: 28 December 2013
- Last flight: 5 February 2025

First stage
- Height: 27.77 m (91.1 ft)
- Diameter: 2.95 m (9 ft 8 in)
- Empty mass: 11,000 kg (24,000 lb)
- Gross mass: 129,000 kg (284,000 lb)
- Powered by: 1 × NK-33A; 1 × RD-0110R
- Maximum thrust: NK-33A SL: 1,515 kN (341,000 lb_{f}); NK-33A vac: 1,687 kN (379,000 lb_{f}); RD-0110R SL: 230.5 kN (51,800 lb_{f}); RD-0110R vac: 265 kN (60,000 lb_{f})
- Specific impulse: NK-33A SL: 297 s (2.91 km/s); NK-33A vac: 331 s (3.25 km/s); RD-0110R SL: 259.4 s (2.544 km/s); RD-0110R vac: 298.4 s (2.926 km/s)
- Burn time: 225 seconds
- Propellant: LOX / RP-1

Second stage – Block I
- Height: 7.95 m (26.1 ft)
- Diameter: 3 m (9.8 ft)
- Empty mass: 2,380 kg (5,250 lb)
- Gross mass: 25,380 kg (55,950 lb)
- Powered by: 1 × RD-0124
- Maximum thrust: 294 kN (66,000 lb_{f})
- Specific impulse: 359 s (3.52 km/s)
- Burn time: 275 seconds
- Propellant: LOX / RP-1

Third stage (optional) – Volga
- Height: 1.025 m (3 ft 4.4 in)
- Diameter: 3.2 m (10 ft)
- Empty mass: 840 kg (1,850 lb)
- Propellant mass: 300–900 kg (660–1,980 lb)
- Powered by: 1 × 17D64
- Maximum thrust: 2.94 kN (660 lb_{f})
- Specific impulse: 307 s (3.01 km/s)
- Burn time: 410 seconds
- Propellant: N_{2}O_{4} / UDMH

The Soyuz‑2.1v (Russian: Союз‑2.1в, lit. 'Union‑2.1c', (Note: The third letter of the Cyrillic alphabet, 'в' (vee), is transliterated as 'v'. Given that this rocket is the third in the Soyuz-2 family, a more appropriate sense-for-sense translation would be the third letter of the Latin alphabet, 'c'.) GRAU index: 14A15) was a Russian expendable small-lift launch vehicle, developed as a derivative of the Soyuz-2 series. It is notable for omitting the four strap-on boosters common to other R-7 family rockets, making it the first R-7 variant without them.

Developed by the Progress Rocket Space Centre (RKTs Progress) in Samara, the Soyuz‑2.1v was originally known as Soyuz‑1 during early development. Launches were conducted from the Plesetsk Cosmodrome in northwest Russia, and were expected to also be conducted from the Vostochny Cosmodrome in eastern Russia, and the Baikonur Cosmodrome in Kazakhstan, but none ever took place.

== Design and configuration ==
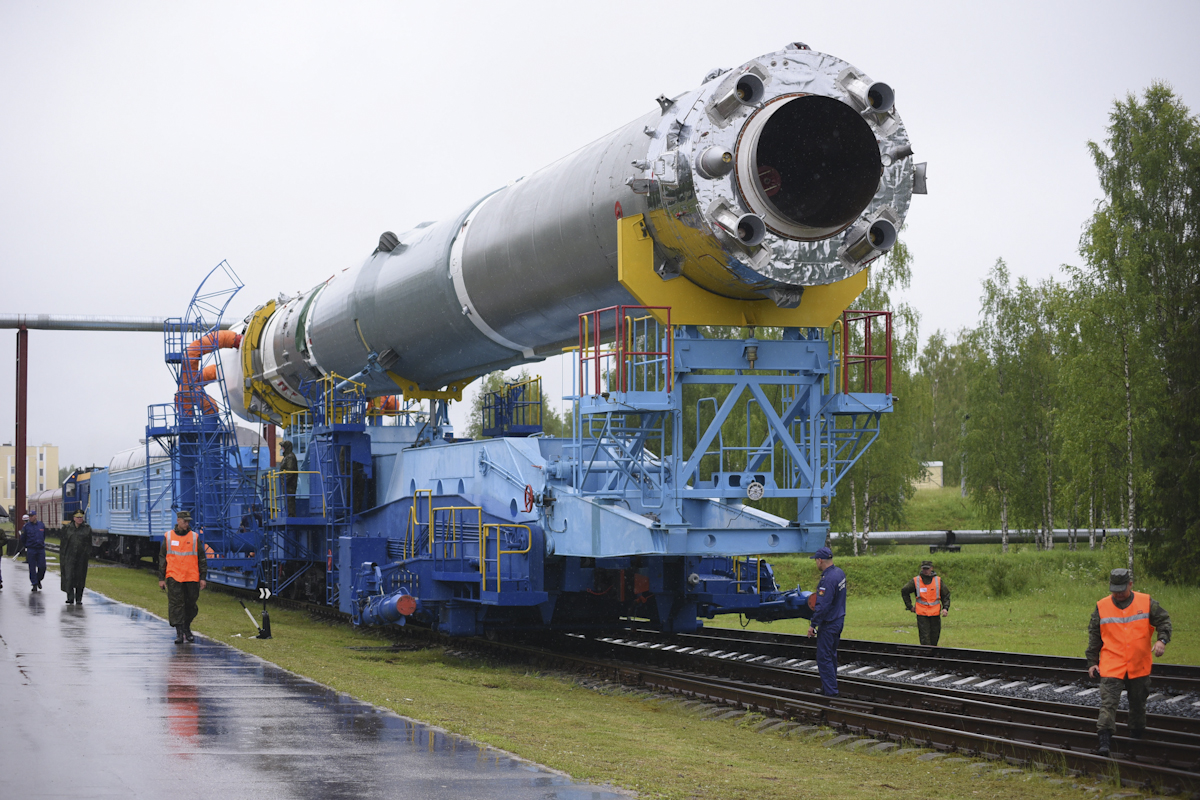
Base of first stage, showing NK-33 and RD-0110R engines

The Soyuz‑2.1v represents a significant departure from previous Soyuz configurations. Unlike its predecessors, it does not utilize four strap-on boosters. Instead, its single core stage is powered by the NK-33 engine, a high-performance engine originally built in the 1970s for the Soviet N1 Moon rocket. Due to its fixed configuration, the core stage also employs the RD-0110R vernier engine, which consists of four gimbaled chambers for steering and contributes approximately 230.5 kilonewtons (51,800 lb_{f}) of thrust.

A limited number of NK-33 engines were available, leading to plans for replacement by the RD-193, a newer engine derived from the Angara's RD-191, itself a derivative of the Zenit's RD-170. However, full transition to the RD-193 has not occurred.

The second stage is identical to the third stage of the Soyuz-2.1b, utilizing a single RD-0124 engine. Most missions also employ the Volga upper stage, adapted from the propulsion system of the Yantar reconnaissance satellite. Volga offers a lighter and more cost-effective alternative to the Fregat upper stage used on other Soyuz-2 missions.

The Soyuz‑2.1v is optimized for small payloads. From Baikonur, it can deliver up to 2,850 kilograms (6,280 lb) to a 200 km (120 mi) circular low Earth orbit (LEO) at 51.8° inclination, and up to 2,800 kilograms (6,200 lb) to the same altitude at 62.8° inclination from Plesetsk.

== List of launches ==
Flight	Date (UTC)	Launch site	Upper stage	Payload	Orbit	Remarks	Outcome
1	28 December 2013; 13:30	Plesetsk, Site 43/4	Volga	Aist 1, SKRL-756 #1/2	LEO	Maiden flight of Soyuz 2.1v	Success
2	5 December 2015; 15:08	Plesetsk, Site 43/4	Volga	Kosmos 2511 & 2512	LEO	Earth observation Radar calibration	Partial failure
3	23 June 2017; 18:04	Plesetsk, Site 43/4	Volga	Kosmos 2519	LEO	Military satellite, possibly geodesy project Nivelir	Success
4	29 March 2018; 17:38	Plesetsk, Site 43/4	—N/a	Kosmos 2525 (EMKA)	SSO	Earth observation	Success
5	10 July 2019; 17:14	Plesetsk, Site 43/4	Volga	Kosmos 2535 to 2538	LEO	Geodesy	Success
6	25 November 2019; 17:52	Plesetsk, Site 43/4	Volga	Kosmos 2542 & 2543	LEO	Satellite inspection	Success
7	9 September 2021; 19:59	Plesetsk, Site 43/4	Volga	Kosmos 2551 (EO MKA No. 1)	SSO	Reconnaissance	Success
8	1 August 2022; 20:25	Plesetsk, Site 43/4	Volga	Kosmos 2558 (Nivelir No. 3)	Polar	Surveillance	Success
9	21 October 2022; 19:20	Plesetsk, Site 43/4	Volga	Kosmos 2561 & 2562	SSO	Surveillance	Success
10	29 March 2023; 19:57	Plesetsk, Site 43/4	—N/a	Kosmos 2568 (EO MKA No. 4)	SSO	Reconnaissance	Success
11	27 December 2023; 07:03	Plesetsk, Site 43/4	—N/a	Kosmos 2574 (Razbeg No. 1)	SSO	Reconnaissance	Success
12	9 February 2024; 07:03	Plesetsk, Site 43/4	—N/a	Kosmos 2575 (Razbeg No. 2)	SSO	Reconnaissance	Success
13	5 February 2025; 03:59	Plesetsk, Site 43/4	Volga	Kosmos 2581-2583 (MKA B1-3)	Polar	Final flight of Soyuz 2.1v	Success

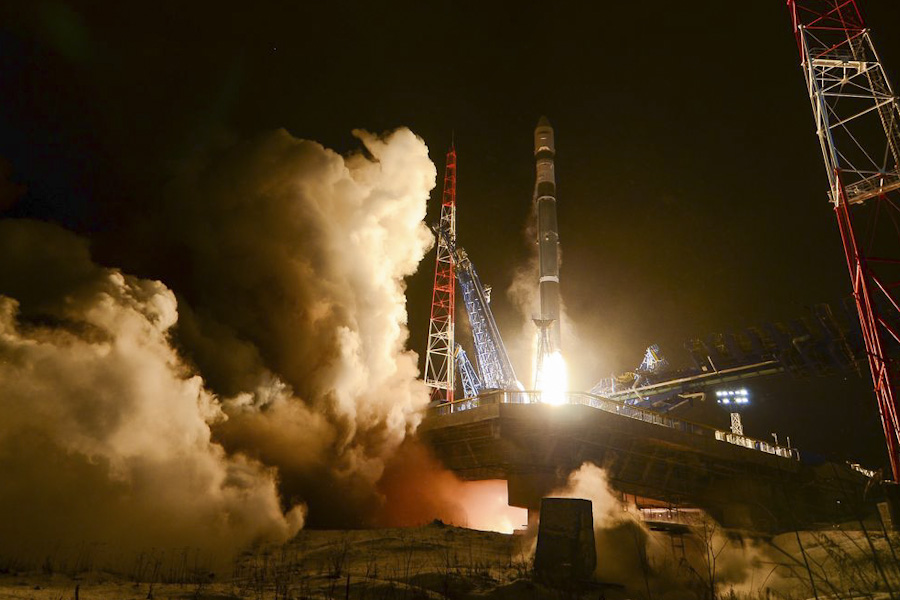
A 2015 nighttime launch of Soyuz-2.1v.

== See also ==
- List of R-7 launches
