= Volga (rocket stage) =

Russian upper rocket stage

- Manufacturer: RKTs Progress
- Country of origin: Russia
- Derived from: Ikar

Launch history
- Total launches: 11
- Successes (stage only): 10
- Other: 1 (partial failure)

General characteristics
- Height: 1.025 m (3 ft 4.4 in)
- Diameter: 3.2 m (10 ft)
- Empty mass: 840 kg (1,850 lb)
- Gross mass: 1,140–1,740 kg (2,510–3,840 lb)
- Propellant mass: 300–900 kg (660–1,980 lb)
- Powered by: 1 × 17D64
- Maximum thrust: 2.94 kN (660 lb_{f})
- Specific impulse: 307 s (3.01 km/s)
- Burn time: 600 seconds
- Propellant: N_{2}O_{4}/UDMH

Volga (Russian: Волга, GRAU index: 14S46 / 141KS) is a Russian rocket upper stage designed for use with the Soyuz-2 and Soyuz-2.1v rockets. It was derived from the propulsion module of the Yantar satellite, and is closely related to the retired Ikar upper stage. It serves as a lighter and more cost-effective alternative to the Fregat upper stage, used on most Soyuz-2 missions. RKTs Progress began development of the Volga in 2008 and the design was finalized in 2010.

Proposed during the development of the Soyuz-2.1v, Volga serves as a third stage capable of delivering payloads up to 1,400 kilograms (3,100 lb) into orbits as high as 1,500 kilometres (930 mi). It is particularly suited for inserting satellites into Sun-synchronous orbits of around 850 kilometres (530 mi). Leveraging existing satellite propulsion technology, Volga costs up to four times less than Fregat and the manufacturer says it could replace it in many Soyuz-2.1a missions.

To accommodate Volga, several modifications were made to the Soyuz payload section, including to antennas, connectors, pyrotechnic devices, and foam insulation inside the fairing.

Typical missions last between 60 and 120 minutes and can deploy a single or multiple payloads with the Volga providing attitude control during flight. After completing its mission, it can deorbit or move to a safe distance. The stage has a maximum operational life of 24 hours.
