= Plesetsk Cosmodrome Site 43 =

Rocket launching complex of the Plesetsk Cosmodrome in northwestern Russia

Site 43
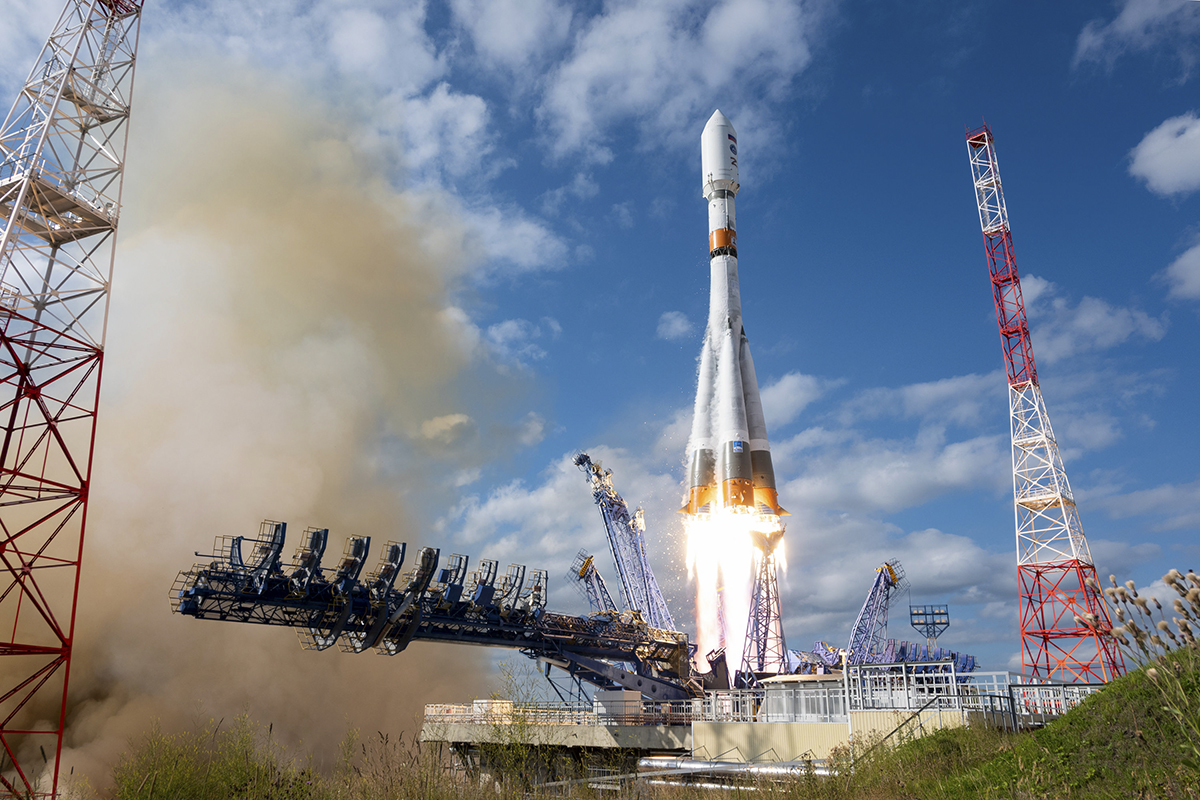
- A Soyuz-2.1b rocket launches a GLONASS-K2 satellite from Site 43/3 in August 2023
- Interactive map of Site 43
- Launch site: Plesetsk Cosmodrome
- Coordinates: 62°55′12″N 40°28′1″E
- Short name: Pu-43
- Operator: Russian Space Forces
- Total launches: 561
- Launch pad: Two
Site 43/3 launch history
- Status: Active
- Launches: 229
- First launch: 21 December 1965; R-7A Semyorka
- Last launch: 7 November 2026; Soyuz-2.1b (Glonass-K1 n°21L)
- Associated rockets: Active: Soyuz-2.1a, Soyuz-2.1b; Retired: R-7A Semyorka, Vostok-2M, Voskhod, Molniya-M, Soyuz-U
Site 43/4 launch history
- Status: Active
- Launches: 332
- First launch: 25 July 1967; R-7A Semyorka
- Last launch: 19 July 2026; Soyuz-2.1b (16 x Rassvet-3)
- Associated rockets: Active: Soyuz-2.1a, Soyuz-2.1b; Retired: R-7A Semyorka, Vostok-2M, Voskhod, Molniya-M, Soyuz-M, Soyuz-U, Soyuz-2.1v

Plesetsk Cosmodrome Site 43, is a launch complex at the Plesetsk Cosmodrome in Russia. It consists of two pads, Sites 43/3 and 43/4 (also known as SK-3 and SK-4) and has been used by R-7-derived rockets since the early 1960s. As of 2025, both pads remain in use for the Soyuz-2.1a and Soyuz-2.1b rockets.

Originally constructed for the R-7A Semyorka missiles, the site hosted its first launch on 21 December 1965, when an R-7A test flight was conducted from Site 43/3. The first launch from Site 43/4 followed on 25 July 1967. After its decommissioning as a missile base, the complex was repurposed for space launches. The first orbital launch occurred on 3 December 1969, when a Voskhod rocket carried the Kosmos 313 satellite into orbit.

Both pads suffered significant damage due to explosions in the 1980s. The first incident, on 18 March 1980, which came to be known as the Plesetsk launch pad disaster, occurred when a Vostok-2M rocket exploded during fueling operations at Site 43/4, killing 48 people and injuring dozens more. The damage was so extensive that the pad remained inactive until 1984. On 18 June 1987, a Soyuz-U rocket exploded at liftoff from Site 43/3.
