= List of Proton launches (2000–2009) =

This is a list of launches made by the Proton rocket between 2000 and 2009. All launches were conducted from the Baikonur Cosmodrome.

== Launches ==
Date/time (UTC)	Configuration	Serial number	Launch pad	Outcome
Date/time (UTC)	Payload	Separation orbit	Operator	Function
Date/time (UTC)	Remarks			
=== 2000 ===
12 February 2000; 09:10:54	Proton-K/Block-DM-2M 8K82K/11S861-01	399-02	Site 81/23	Successful
12 February 2000; 09:10:54	Garuda 1	Geosynchronous transfer		Communications
12 February 2000; 09:10:54	Commercial launch conducted by International Launch Services			
12 March 2000; 04:07:00	Proton-K/Block-DM-2M 8K82K/11S861-01	399-01	Site 200/39	Successful
12 March 2000; 04:07:00	Ekspress-A2	Geosynchronous		Communications
17 April 2000; 21:06:00	Proton-K/Block-DM-2M 8K82K/11S861-01	397-01	Site 200/39	Successful
17 April 2000; 21:06:00	SESAT 1	Geosynchronous transfer		Communications
6 June 2000; 02:59:00	Proton-K/Briz-M 8K82K/11S43	392-01	Site 81/24	Successful
6 June 2000; 02:59:00	Gorizont #45L	Geosynchronous		Communications
6 June 2000; 02:59:00	First successful flight of the Briz-M			
24 June 2000; 00:28:00	Proton-K/Block-DM-2M 8K82K/11S861-01	394-02	Site 200/39	Successful
24 June 2000; 00:28:00	Ekspress-A3	Geosynchronous		Communications
30 June 2000; 22:08:47	Proton-K/Block-DM-2M 8K82K/11S861-01	400-01	Site 81/24	Successful
30 June 2000; 22:08:47	Sirius FM-1	Geosynchronous transfer		Communications
30 June 2000; 22:08:47	Commercial launch conducted by International Launch Services			
4 July 2000; 23:44:00	Proton-K/Block-DM-2 8K82K/11S861	389-02	Site 200/39	Successful
4 July 2000; 23:44:00	Kosmos 2371 (Geizer #22L)	Geosynchronous		Communications
12 July 2000; 04:56:36	Proton-K 8K82K	398-01	Site 81/23	Successful
12 July 2000; 04:56:36	Zvezda	Low Earth orbit		Space station module
28 August 2000; 20:08	Proton-K/Block-DM-2 8K82K/11S861	401-02	Site 81/24	Successful
28 August 2000; 20:08	Raduga-1 #5 (Globus #15L)	Geosynchronous		Communications
5 September 2000; 09:43:58	Proton-K/Block-DM-2M 8K82K/11S861-01	400-02	Site 81/23	Successful
5 September 2000; 09:43:58	Sirius FM-2	Geosynchronous transfer		Communications
5 September 2000; 09:43:58	Commercial launch conducted by International Launch Services			
1 October 2000; 22:00:00	Proton-K/Block-DM-2M 8K82K/11S861-01	401-01	Site 81/23	Successful
1 October 2000; 22:00:00	GE-1A	Geosynchronous transfer		Communications
1 October 2000; 22:00:00	Commercial launch conducted by International Launch Services			
13 October 2000; 14:12:45	Proton-K/Block-DM-2 8K82K/11S861	393-01	Site 81/24	Successful
13 October 2000; 14:12:45	Kosmos 2374 (Uragan #783)	Medium Earth		Navigation
13 October 2000; 14:12:45	Kosmos 2375 (Uragan #787)	Medium Earth		Navigation
13 October 2000; 14:12:45	Kosmos 2376 (Uragan #788)	Medium Earth		Navigation
21 October 2000; 22:00:00	Proton-K/Block-DM-2M 8K82K/11S861-01	402-01	Site 81/23	Successful
21 October 2000; 22:00:00	GE-6	Geosynchronous transfer		Communications
21 October 2000; 22:00:00	Commercial launch conducted by International Launch Services			
30 November 2000; 19:59:47	Proton-K/Block-DM-2M 8K82K/11S861-01	402-02	Site 81/23	Successful
30 November 2000; 19:59:47	Sirius FM-3	Geosynchronous transfer		Communications
30 November 2000; 19:59:47	Commercial launch conducted by International Launch Services			
=== 2001 ===
7 April 2001; 03:47:00	Proton-M/Briz-M 8K82KM/11S43	535-01	Site 81/24	Successful
7 April 2001; 03:47:00	Ekran-M #18L	Geosynchronous		Communications
7 April 2001; 03:47:00	Maiden flight of the Proton-M			
15 May 2001; 01:11:30	Proton-K/Block-DM-2M 8K82K/11S861-01	403-01	Site 81/23	Successful
15 May 2001; 01:11:30	PanAmSat-10	Geosynchronous transfer		Communications
15 May 2001; 01:11:30	Commercial launch conducted by International Launch Services			
16 June 2001; 01:49:00	Proton-K/Block-DM-2M 8K82K/11S861-01	403-02	Site 81/23	Successful
16 June 2001; 01:49:00	Astra-2C	Geosynchronous transfer		Communications
16 June 2001; 01:49:00	Commercial launch conducted by International Launch Services			
24 August 2001; 20:35	Proton-K/Block-DM-2 8K82K/11S861	404-01	Site 81/24	Successful
24 August 2001; 20:35	Kosmos 2379 (US-KMO)	Geosynchronous		Missile warning
6 October 2001; 16:45:00	Proton-K/Block-DM-2 8K82K/11S861	405-01	Site 81/24	Successful
6 October 2001; 16:45:00	Raduga-1 #6 (Globus #16L)	Geosynchronous		Communications
1 December 2001; 18:04:44	Proton-K/Block-DM-2 8K82K/11S861	405-02	Site 81/24	Successful
1 December 2001; 18:04:44	Kosmos 2380 (Uragan #790)	Medium Earth		Navigation
1 December 2001; 18:04:44	Kosmos 2381 (Uragan #789)	Medium Earth		Navigation
1 December 2001; 18:04:44	Kosmos 2382 (Uragan-M #711)	Medium Earth		Navigation
=== 2002 ===
30 March 2002; 17:25:00	Proton-K/Block-DM-2M 8K82K/11S861-01	406-01	Site 81/23	Successful
30 March 2002; 17:25:00	Intelsat 903	Geosynchronous transfer		Communications
30 March 2002; 17:25:00	Commercial launch conducted by International Launch Services			
7 May 2002; 17:00:00	Proton-K/Block-DM-2M 8K82K/11S861-01	404-02	Site 81/24	Successful
7 May 2002; 17:00:00	DirecTV-5	Geosynchronous transfer		Communications
7 May 2002; 17:00:00	Commercial launch conducted by International Launch Services			
10 June 2002; 01:14:00	Proton-K/Block-DM-2M 8K82K/11S861-01	407-01	Site 200/39	Successful
10 June 2002; 01:14:00	Ekspress-A1R	Geosynchronous		Communications
25 July 2002; 15:13:21	Proton-K/Block-DM-5 8K82K/17S40	408-01	Site 81/24	Successful
25 July 2002; 15:13:21	Kosmos 2392 (Araks #2)	Medium Earth orbit		Reconnaissance
22 August 2002; 05:15:00	Proton-K/Block-DM-2M 8K82K/11S861-01	406-02	Site 81/23	Successful
22 August 2002; 05:15:00	Echostar VIII	Geosynchronous transfer		Communications
22 August 2002; 05:15:00	Commercial launch conducted by International Launch Services			
17 October 2002; 04:41:00	Proton-K/Block-DM-5 8K82K/17S40	409-01	Site 200/39	Successful
17 October 2002; 04:41:00	INTEGRAL	High Earth orbit		Gamma-ray astronomical observatory
25 November 2002; 23:04:23	Proton-K/Block-DM-2M 8K82K/11S861-01	408-02	Site 81/23	Failure
25 November 2002; 23:04:23	Astra 1K	Geosynchronous transfer (intended)		Communications
25 November 2002; 23:04:23	Commercial launch conducted by International Launch Services. The engine of the Block-DM upper stage shut down prematurely during the second planned burn, leaving the payload stranded in low Earth orbit.			
25 December 2002; 07:37:58	Proton-K/Block-DM-2M 8K82K/11S861-01	409-02	Site 81/23	Successful
25 December 2002; 07:37:58	Kosmos 2394 (Uragan #791)	Medium Earth		Navigation
25 December 2002; 07:37:58	Kosmos 2395 (Uragan #792)	Medium Earth		Navigation
25 December 2002; 07:37:58	Kosmos 2396 (Uragan #793)	Medium Earth		Navigation
29 December 2002; 23:16:40	Proton-M/Briz-M 8K82KM/11S43	535-02	Site 81/24	Successful
29 December 2002; 23:16:40	Nimiq-2	Geosynchronous transfer		Communications
29 December 2002; 23:16:40	Commercial launch conducted by International Launch Services			
=== 2003 ===
24 April 2003; 04:23:17	Proton-K/Block-DM-2 8K82K/11S861	410-02	Site 81/24	Successful
24 April 2003; 04:23:17	Kosmos 2397 (US-KMO)	Geosynchronous		Missile warning
6 June 2003; 22:15:15	Proton-K/Briz-M 8K82K/11S43	410-01	Site 200/39	Successful
6 June 2003; 22:15:15	AMC-9	Geosynchronous transfer		Communications
6 June 2003; 22:15:15	Commercial launch conducted by International Launch Services			
24 November 2003; 06:22:00	Proton-K/Block-DM-2M 8K82K/11S861-01	407-02	Site 81/23	Successful
24 November 2003; 06:22:00	Yamal 201	Geosynchronous		Communications
24 November 2003; 06:22:00	Yamal 202	Geosynchronous		Communications
10 December 2003; 17:42:12	Proton-K/Briz-M 8K82K/11S43	410-03	Site 81/24	Successful
10 December 2003; 17:42:12	Kosmos 2402 (Uragan #794)	Medium Earth		Navigation
10 December 2003; 17:42:12	Kosmos 2403 (Uragan #795)	Medium Earth		Navigation
10 December 2003; 17:42:12	Kosmos 2404 (Uragan-M #701)	Medium Earth		Navigation
28 December 2003; 23:00:00	Proton-K/Block-DM-2M 8K82K/11S861-01	410-04	Site 200/39	Successful
28 December 2003; 23:00:00	Ekspress-AM22	Geosynchronous		Communications
=== 2004 ===
15 March 2004; 23:06:00	Proton-M/Briz-M 8K82KM/11S43	535-03	Site 81/24	Successful
15 March 2004; 23:06:00	Eutelsat W3A	Geosynchronous transfer		Communications
15 March 2004; 23:06:00	Commercial launch conducted by International Launch Services			
27 March 2004; 03:30	Proton-K/Block-DM-2 8K82K/11S861	410-05	Site 81/23	Successful
27 March 2004; 03:30	Raduga-1 #7 (Globus #17L)	Geosynchronous		Communications
26 April 2004; 20:37:00	Proton-K/Block-DM-2M 8K82K/11S861-01	410-06	Site 200/39	Successful
26 April 2004; 20:37:00	Ekspress-AM11	Geosynchronous		Communications
16 June 2004; 22:27:00	Proton-M/Briz-M 8K82KM/11S43	535-06	Site 200/39	Successful
16 June 2004; 22:27:00	Intelsat-10-02	Geosynchronous transfer		Communications
16 June 2004; 22:27:00	Commercial launch conducted by International Launch Services			
4 August 2004; 22:32:00	Proton-M/Briz-M 8K82KM/11S43	535-07	Site 200/39	Successful
4 August 2004; 22:32:00	Amazonas 1	Geosynchronous transfer		Communications
4 August 2004; 22:32:00	Commercial launch conducted by International Launch Services			
14 October 2004; 21:23:00	Proton-M/Briz-M 8K82KM/11S43	535-08	Site 200/39	Successful
14 October 2004; 21:23:00	AMC-15	Geosynchronous transfer		Communications
14 October 2004; 21:23:00	Commercial launch conducted by International Launch Services			
29 October 2004; 22:11:00	Proton-K/Block-DM-2M 8K82K/11S861-01	410-08	Site 200/39	Successful
29 October 2004; 22:11:00	Ekspress-AM1	Geosynchronous		Communications
26 December 2004; 13:53:31	Proton-K/Block-DM-2M 8K82K/11S861-01	410-09	Site 200/39	Successful
26 December 2004; 13:53:31	Kosmos 2411 (Uragan #796)	Medium Earth		Navigation
26 December 2004; 13:53:31	Kosmos 2412 (Uragan #797)	Medium Earth		Navigation
26 December 2004; 13:53:31	Kosmos 2413 (Uragan-M #712)	Medium Earth		Navigation
=== 2005 ===
3 February 2005; 02:27:32	Proton-M/Briz-M 8K82KM/11S43	535-09	Site 81/24	Successful
3 February 2005; 02:27:32	AMC-12	Geosynchronous transfer		Communications
3 February 2005; 02:27:32	Commercial launch conducted by International Launch Services			
29 March 2005; 21:31:00	Proton-K/Block-DM-2M 8K82K/11S861-01	410-10	Site 200/39	Successful
29 March 2005; 21:31:00	Ekspress-AM2	Geosynchronous		Communications
22 May 2005; 17:59:08	Proton-M/Briz-M 8K82KM/11S43	535-10	Site 200/39	Successful
22 May 2005; 17:59:08	DirecTV-8	Geosynchronous transfer		Communications
22 May 2005; 17:59:08	Commercial launch conducted by International Launch Services			
24 June 2005; 19:41:00	Proton-K/Block-DM-2 8K82K/11S861	410-07	Site 200/39	Successful
24 June 2005; 19:41:00	Ekspress-AM3	Geosynchronous		Communications
8 September 2005; 21:53:40	Proton-M/Briz-M 8K82KM/11S43	535-12	Site 200/39	Successful
8 September 2005; 21:53:40	Anik-F1R	Geosynchronous transfer		Communications
8 September 2005; 21:53:40	Commercial launch conducted by International Launch Services			
25 December 2005; 05:07:10	Proton-K/Block-DM-2 8K82K/11S861	410-11	Site 81/24	Successful
25 December 2005; 05:07:10	Kosmos 2417 (Uragan #798)	Medium Earth		Navigation
25 December 2005; 05:07:10	Kosmos 2418 (Uragan-M #713)	Medium Earth		Navigation
25 December 2005; 05:07:10	Kosmos 2419 (Uragan-M #714)	Medium Earth		Navigation
29 December 2005; 02:28:40	Proton-M/Briz-M 8K82KM/11S43	535-13	Site 200/39	Successful
29 December 2005; 02:28:40	AMC-23	Geosynchronous transfer		Communications
29 December 2005; 02:28:40	Commercial launch conducted by International Launch Services			
=== 2006 ===
28 February 2006; 20:10:00	Proton-M/Briz-M 8K82KM/11S43	535-11	Site 200/39	Failure
28 February 2006; 20:10:00	Arabsat-4A (Badr-1)	Geosynchronous transfer (intended)		Communications
28 February 2006; 20:10:00	Commercial launch conducted by International Launch Services. Briz-M upper stage shut down prematurely due to a burn through in the oxidizer supply system during the second burn.			
17 June 2006; 22:44:05	Proton-K/Block-DM-2M 8K82K/11S861-01	410-12	Site 200/39	Successful
17 June 2006; 22:44:05	KazSat-1	Geosynchronous		Communications
4 August 2006; 21:48:00	Proton-M/Briz-M 8K82KM/11S43	535-14	Site 200/39	Successful
4 August 2006; 21:48:00	Hot Bird 8	Geosynchronous transfer		Communications
4 August 2006; 21:48:00	Commercial launch conducted by International Launch Services			
8 November 2006; 20:01:00	Proton-M/Briz-M 8K82KM/11S43	535-15	Site 200/39	Successful
8 November 2006; 20:01:00	Arabsat-4B (Badr-4)	Geosynchronous transfer		Communications
8 November 2006; 20:01:00	Commercial launch conducted by International Launch Services			
11 December 2006; 23:28:43	Proton-M/Briz-M 8K82KM/11S43	535-21	Site 200/39	Successful
11 December 2006; 23:28:43	MEASAT-3	Geosynchronous transfer		Communications
11 December 2006; 23:28:43	Commercial launch conducted by International Launch Services			
25 December 2006; 20:18:12	Proton-K/Block-DM-2 8K82K/11S861	410-15	Site 81/24	Successful
25 December 2006; 20:18:12	Kosmos 2424 (Uragan-M #715)	Medium Earth		Navigation
25 December 2006; 20:18:12	Kosmos 2425 (Uragan-M #716)	Medium Earth		Navigation
25 December 2006; 20:18:12	Kosmos 2426 (Uragan-M #717)	Medium Earth		Navigation
=== 2007 ===
9 April 2007; 22:54:00	Proton-M/Briz-M 8K82KM/11S43	535-16	Site 200/39	Successful
9 April 2007; 22:54:00	Anik-F3	Geosynchronous transfer		Communications
9 April 2007; 22:54:00	Commercial launch conducted by International Launch Services			
7 July 2007; 01:16:00	Proton-M/Briz-M 8K82KM/11S43	535-20	Site 200/39	Successful
7 July 2007; 01:16:00	DirecTV-10	Geosynchronous transfer		Communications
7 July 2007; 01:16:00	Commercial launch conducted by International Launch Services. First flight of an enhanced Proton-M.			
5 September 2007; 22:43:10	Proton-M/Briz-M 8K82KM/11S43	535-22	Site 200/39	Failure
5 September 2007; 22:43:10	JCSAT-11	Geosynchronous transfer (intended)		Communications
5 September 2007; 22:43:10	Commercial launch conducted by International Launch Services. The first and second stages of the rocket failed to separate due to a damaged pyrotechnic firing cable.			
26 October 2007; 07:35:24	Proton-K/Block-DM-2 8K82K/11S861	410-17	Site 81/24	Successful
26 October 2007; 07:35:24	Kosmos 2431 (Uragan-M #718)	Medium Earth		Navigation
26 October 2007; 07:35:24	Kosmos 2432 (Uragan-M #719)	Medium Earth		Navigation
26 October 2007; 07:35:24	Kosmos 2433 (Uragan-M #720)	Medium Earth		Navigation
17 November 2007; 22:39:47	Proton-M/Briz-M 8K82KM/11S43	535-23	Site 200/39	Successful
17 November 2007; 22:39:47	Sirius 4	Geosynchronous transfer		Communications
17 November 2007; 22:39:47	Commercial launch conducted by International Launch Services			
9 December 2007; 00:16	Proton-M/Briz-M 8K82KM/11S43	535-26	Site 81/24	Successful
9 December 2007; 00:16	Raduga-1M #1	Geosynchronous		Communications
25 December 2007; 19:32:34	Proton-M/Block-DM-2 8K82KM/11S861	535-28	Site 81/24	Successful
25 December 2007; 19:32:34	Kosmos 2434 (Uragan-M #721)	Medium Earth		Navigation
25 December 2007; 19:32:34	Kosmos 2435 (Uragan-M #722)	Medium Earth		Navigation
25 December 2007; 19:32:34	Kosmos 2436 (Uragan-M #723)	Medium Earth		Navigation
=== 2008 ===
28 January 2008; 00:18:00	Proton-M/Briz-M 8K82KM/11S43	535-27	Site 200/39	Successful
28 January 2008; 00:18:00	Ekspress-AM33	Geosynchronous		Communications
11 February 2008; 11:34:00	Proton-M/Briz-M 8K82KM/11S43	535-24	Site 200/39	Successful
11 February 2008; 11:34:00	Thor 5	Geosynchronous		Communications
11 February 2008; 11:34:00	Commercial launch conducted by International Launch Services			
14 March 2008; 23:18:55	Proton-M/Briz-M 8K82KM/11S43	535-25	Site 200/39	Failure
14 March 2008; 23:18:55	AMC-14	Geosynchronous transfer (intended)		Communications
14 March 2008; 23:18:55	Commercial launch conducted by International Launch Services. Briz-M upper stage shut down prematurely due to rupturing of the gas duct between the gas generator and the propellant pump turbine by high heat erosion.			
26 June 2008; 23:59:43	Proton-K/Block-DM-2 8K82K/11S861	410-14	Site 81/24	Successful
26 June 2008; 23:59:43	Kosmos 2440 (US-KMO)	Geosynchronous		Missile warning
19 August 2008; 22:43:00	Proton-M/Briz-M 8K82KM/11S43	935-02	Site 200/39	Successful
19 August 2008; 22:43:00	Inmarsat 4-F3	Geosynchronous transfer		Communications
19 August 2008; 22:43:00	Commercial launch conducted by International Launch Services			
19 September 2008; 21:48:00	Proton-M/Briz-M 8K82KM/11S43	535-29	Site 200/39	Successful
19 September 2008; 21:48:00	Nimiq-4	Geosynchronous transfer		Communications
19 September 2008; 21:48:00	Commercial launch conducted by International Launch Services			
25 September 2008; 08:49:37	Proton-M/Block-DM-2 8K82KM/11S861	535-31	Site 81/24	Successful
25 September 2008; 08:49:37	Kosmos 2442 (Uragan-M #724)	Medium Earth		Navigation
25 September 2008; 08:49:37	Kosmos 2443 (Uragan-M #725)	Medium Earth		Navigation
25 September 2008; 08:49:37	Kosmos 2444 (Uragan-M #726)	Medium Earth		Navigation
15 November 2008; 20:44:20	Proton-M/Briz-M 8K82KM/11S43	535-33	Site 200/39	Successful
15 November 2008; 20:44:20	Astra 1M	Geosynchronous transfer		Communications
15 November 2008; 20:44:20	Commercial launch conducted by International Launch Services			
10 December 2008; 13:43:00	Proton-M/Briz-M 8K82KM/11S43	935-03	Site 200/39	Successful
10 December 2008; 13:43:00	Ciel-2	Geosynchronous transfer		Communications
10 December 2008; 13:43:00	Commercial launch conducted by International Launch Services			
25 December 2008; 10:43:42	Proton-M/Block-DM-2 8K82KM/11S861	535-34	Site 81/24	Successful
25 December 2008; 10:43:42	Kosmos 2447 (Uragan-M #727)	Medium Earth		Navigation
25 December 2008; 10:43:42	Kosmos 2448 (Uragan-M #728)	Medium Earth		Navigation
25 December 2008; 10:43:42	Kosmos 2449 (Uragan-M #729)	Medium Earth		Navigation
=== 2009 ===
10 February 2009; 00:03:00	Proton-M/Briz-M 8K82KM/11S43	935-01	Site 200/39	Successful
10 February 2009; 00:03:00	Ekspress-AM44	Geosynchronous		Communications
10 February 2009; 00:03:00	Ekspress-MD1	Geosynchronous		Communications
28 February 2009; 04:10:00	Proton-K/Block-DM-2 8K82K/11S861	410-16	Site 81/24	Successful
28 February 2009; 04:10:00	Raduga-1 #8 (Globus #18L)	Geosynchronous		Communications
3 April 2009; 16:24:00	Proton-M/Briz-M 8K82KM/11S43	935-04	Site 200/39	Successful
3 April 2009; 16:24:00	Eutelsat W2A	Geosynchronous transfer		Communications
3 April 2009; 16:24:00	Commercial launch conducted by International Launch Services			
16 May 2009; 00:57:38	Proton-M/Briz-M 8K82KM/11S43	935-05	Site 200/39	Successful
16 May 2009; 00:57:38	ProtoStar 2 (SES-7)	Geosynchronous transfer		Communications
16 May 2009; 00:57:38	Commercial launch conducted by International Launch Services			
30 June 2009; 19:10:00	Proton-M/Briz-M 8K82KM/11S43	935-06	Site 200/39	Successful
30 June 2009; 19:10:00	Sirius FM-5	Geosynchronous transfer		Communications
30 June 2009; 19:10:00	Commercial launch conducted by International Launch Services			
11 August 2009; 19:47:33	Proton-M/Briz-M 8K82KM/11S43	935-07	Site 200/39	Successful
11 August 2009; 19:47:33	AsiaSat 5	Geosynchronous transfer		Communications
11 August 2009; 19:47:33	Commercial launch conducted by International Launch Services			
17 September 2009; 19:19:19	Proton-M/Briz-M 8K82KM/11S43	935-08	Site 200/39	Successful
17 September 2009; 19:19:19	Nimiq-5	Geosynchronous transfer		Communications
17 September 2009; 19:19:19	Commercial launch conducted by International Launch Services			
24 November 2009; 14:19:10	Proton-M/Briz-M 8K82KM/11S43	935-09	Site 200/39	Successful
24 November 2009; 14:19:10	Eutelsat W7	Geosynchronous transfer		Communications
24 November 2009; 14:19:10	Commercial launch conducted by International Launch Services			
14 December 2009; 10:38:27	Proton-M/Block-DM-2 8K82KM/11S861	535-38	Site 81/24	Successful
14 December 2009; 10:38:27	Kosmos 2456 (Uragan-M #730)	Medium Earth		Navigation
14 December 2009; 10:38:27	Kosmos 2457 (Uragan-M #733)	Medium Earth		Navigation
14 December 2009; 10:38:27	Kosmos 2458 (Uragan-M #734)	Medium Earth		Navigation
29 December 2009; 00:22:00	Proton-M/Briz-M 8K82KM/11S43	935-10	Site 200/39	Successful
29 December 2009; 00:22:00	DirecTV-12	Geosynchronous transfer		Communications
29 December 2009; 00:22:00	Commercial launch conducted by International Launch Services			
