= Kosmos 2380 =

Russian GLONASS navigation satellite

- Mission type: Navigation
- Operator: Russian Space Forces
- COSPAR ID: 2001-053C
- SATCAT no.: 26989
- Mission duration: 24 years, 11 months and 2 days (in orbit)

Spacecraft properties
- Spacecraft: GC 790
- Spacecraft type: Uragan
- Manufacturer: Reshetnev ISS

Start of mission
- Launch date: December 1, 2001, 18:04 UTC
- Rocket: Proton-K/DM-2
- Launch site: Baikonur 81/24

End of mission
- Disposal: Decommissioned
- Deactivated: December 19, 2003

Orbital parameters
- Reference system: Geocentric
- Regime: Medium Earth orbit

Kosmos 2380 (Russian: Космос 2380 meaning Cosmos 2380) is one of a set of three Russian military satellites launched in 2001 as part of the GLONASS satellite navigation system. It was launched with Kosmos 2381 and Kosmos 2382.

This satellite is a GLONASS satellite, also known as Uragan, and is numbered Uragan No. 790.

Kosmos 2380/1/2 were launched from Site 81/24 at Baikonur Cosmodrome in Kazakhstan. A Proton-K carrier rocket with a Blok DM upper stage was used to perform the launch which took place at 18:04 UTC on 1 December 2001. The launch successfully placed the satellites into Medium Earth orbit. It subsequently received its Kosmos designation, and the international designator 2001-053C. The United States Space Command assigned it the Satellite Catalog Number 26989.

It was in the first orbital plane in orbital slot 6. It is no longer part of the GLONASS constellation.

== See also ==
- List of Kosmos satellites (2251–2500)
- List of Proton launches (2000–2009)
