= Kosmos 2434 =

Russian navigation satellite

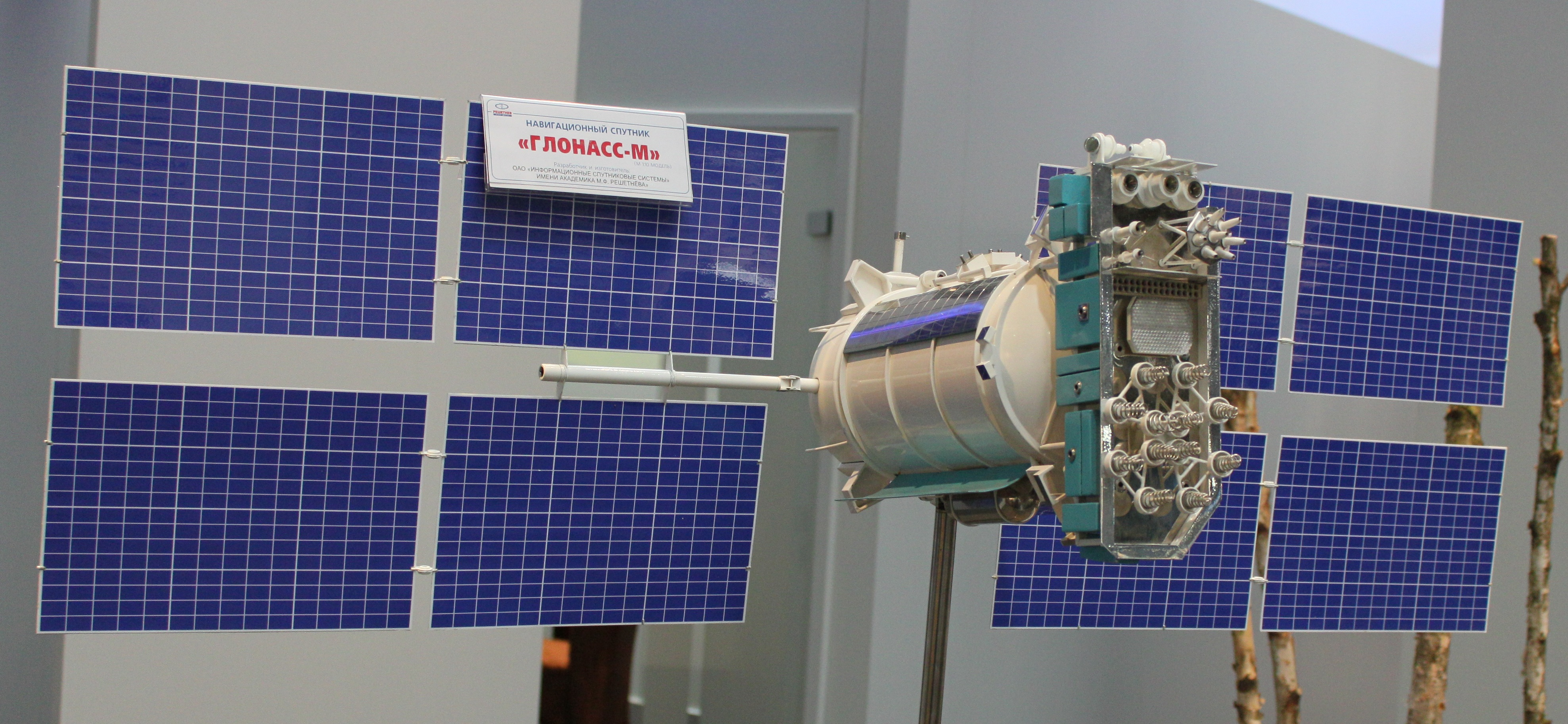
- Mission type: Navigation
- Operator: Russian Space Forces
- COSPAR ID: 2007-065A
- SATCAT no.: 32393

Spacecraft properties
- Spacecraft: GC 721
- Spacecraft type: Uragan-M
- Manufacturer: Reshetnev ISS
- Launch mass: 1415 kg
- Dimensions: 1.3 m diameter
- Power: 1540 watts

Start of mission
- Launch date: December 25, 2007, 19:32 UTC
- Rocket: Proton-M/DM-2
- Launch site: Baikonur, Site 81/24
- Entered service: 8 February 2008

Orbital parameters
- Reference system: Geocentric
- Regime: Medium Earth orbit
- Slot: 13

Kosmos 2434 (Russian: Космос 2434 meaning Cosmos 2434) is one of a set of three Russian military satellites launched in 2007 as part of the GLONASS satellite navigation system. It was launched with Kosmos 2435 and Kosmos 2436.

This satellite is a GLONASS-M satellite, also known as Uragan-M, and is numbered Uragan-M No. 721.

Kosmos 2434 / 2435 / 2436 were launched from Site 81/24 at Baikonur Cosmodrome in Kazakhstan. A Proton-M carrier rocket with a Blok DM upper stage was used to perform the launch which took place at 19:32 UTC on 25 December 2007. The launch successfully placed the satellites into Medium Earth orbit. It subsequently received its Kosmos designation, and the International Designator 2007-065A. The United States Space Command assigned it the Satellite Catalog Number 32393.

It is currently part of the GLONASS constellation in the first orbital plane, orbital slot 13. It started operation on 8 February 2008.·

== See also ==
- List of Kosmos satellites (2251–2500)
- List of Proton launches (2000–2009)
