= Kosmos 2432 =

Russian navigation satellite

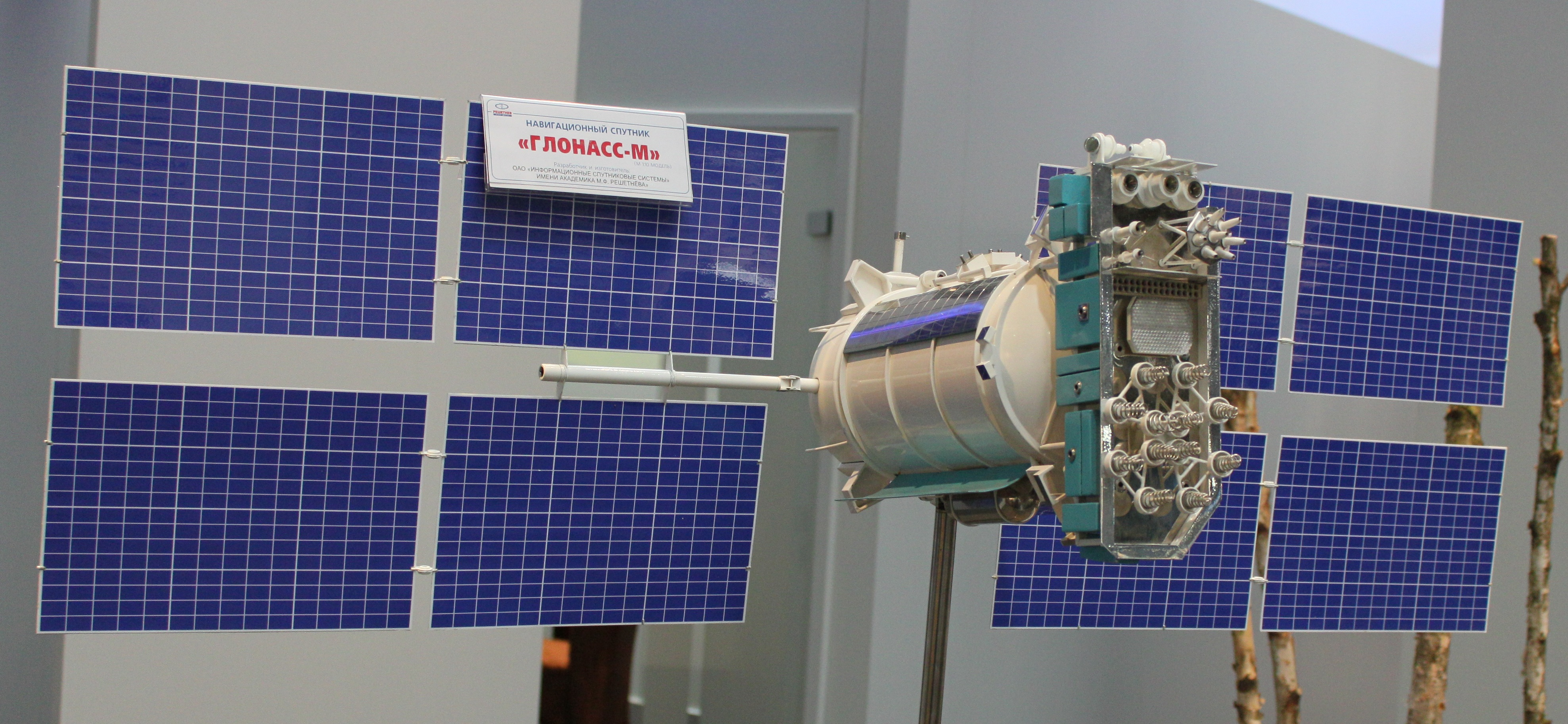
- Mission type: Navigation
- Operator: Russian Space Forces
- COSPAR ID: 2007-052B
- SATCAT no.: 32276

Spacecraft properties
- Spacecraft: GC 719
- Spacecraft type: Uragan-M
- Manufacturer: Reshetnev ISS
- Launch mass: 1415 kg
- Dimensions: 1.3 m diameter
- Power: 1540 watts

Start of mission
- Launch date: October 26, 2007, 07:35 UTC
- Rocket: Proton-K/DM-2
- Launch site: Baikonur, Site 81/24
- Entered service: 27 November 2007

Orbital parameters
- Reference system: Geocentric
- Regime: Medium Earth orbit
- Slot: 20

Kosmos 2432 (Russian: Космос 2432 meaning Cosmos 2432) is one of a set of three Russian military satellites launched in 2007 as part of the GLONASS satellite navigation system. It was launched with Kosmos 2431 and Kosmos 2433.

This satellite is a GLONASS-M satellite, also known as Uragan-M, and is numbered Uragan-M No. 719.

Kosmos 2431 / 2432 / 2433 were launched from Site 81/24 at Baikonur Cosmodrome in Kazakhstan. A Proton-K carrier rocket with a Blok DM upper stage was used to perform the launch which took place at 07:35 UTC on 26 October 2007. The launch successfully placed the satellites into Medium Earth orbit. It subsequently received its Kosmos designation, and the International Designator 2007-052B. The United States Space Command assigned it the Satellite Catalog Number 32276.

It is part of the GLONASS constellation, in the third plane, orbital slot 20. It started operation on 27 November 2007.·

== See also ==
- List of Kosmos satellites (2251–2500)
- List of Proton launches (2000–2009)
