= Kosmos 2418 =

Russian navigation satellite

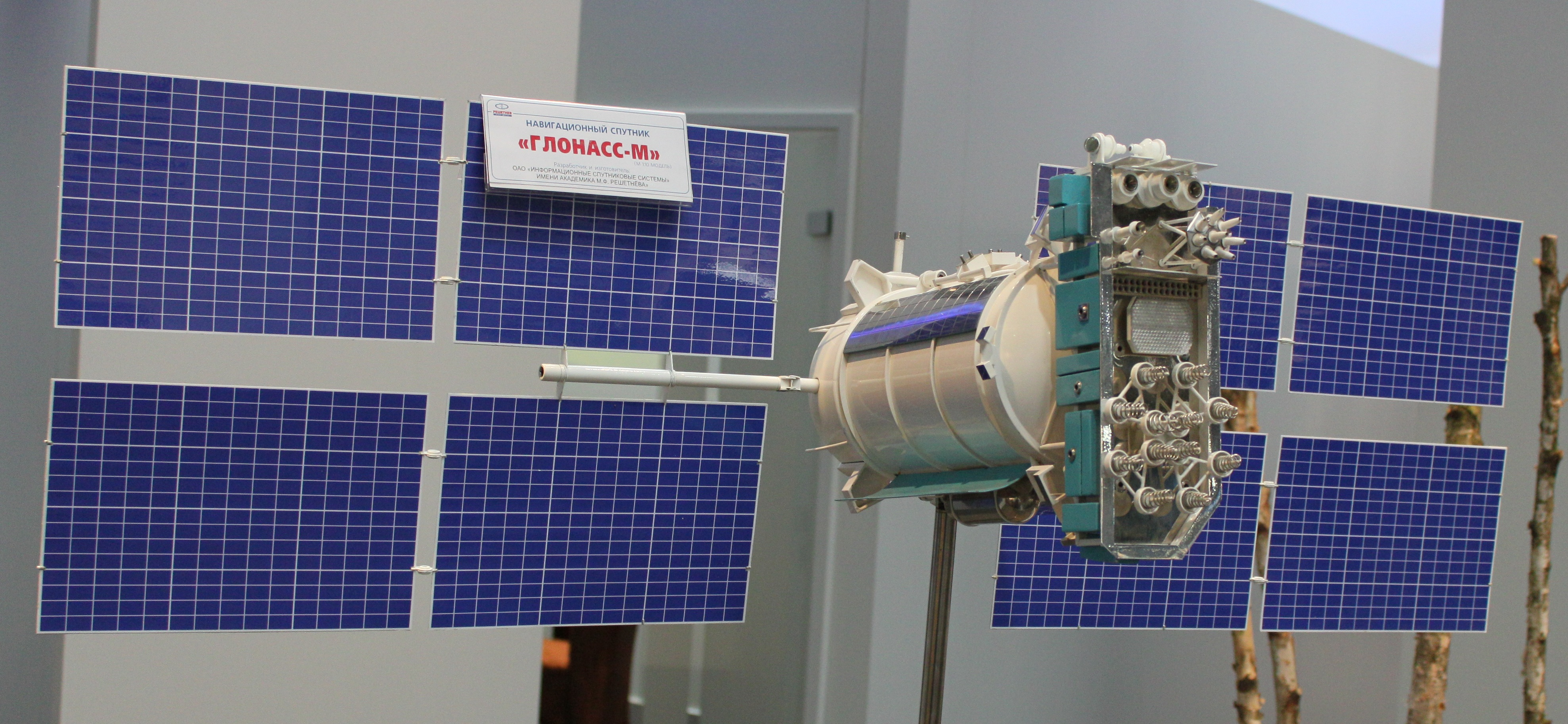
- Mission type: Navigation
- Operator: Russian Space Forces
- COSPAR ID: 2005-050B
- SATCAT no.: 28916

Spacecraft properties
- Spacecraft: GC 713
- Spacecraft type: Uragan-M
- Manufacturer: Reshetnev ISS
- Launch mass: 1415 kg
- Dimensions: 1.3 m diameter
- Power: 1540 watts

Start of mission
- Launch date: December 25, 2005, 05:07 UTC
- Rocket: Proton-K/DM-2
- Launch site: Baikonur, Site 81/24

Orbital parameters
- Reference system: Geocentric
- Regime: Medium Earth orbit
- Slot: 24

Kosmos 2418 (Russian: Космос 2418 meaning Cosmos 2418) is one of a set of three Russian military satellites launched in 2005 as part of the GLONASS satellite navigation system. It was launched with Kosmos 2417 and Kosmos 2419.

This satellite is a GLONASS-M satellite, also known as Uragan-M. It was assigned GLONASS-M №13L number by the manufacturer and 713 by the Ground Control.

Kosmos 2417 / 2418 / 2419 were launched from Site 81/24 at Baikonur Cosmodrome in Kazakhstan. A Proton-K carrier rocket with a Blok DM upper stage was used to perform the launch which took place at 05:07 UTC on 25 December 2005. The launch successfully placed the satellites into Medium Earth orbit. It subsequently received its Kosmos designation, and the International Designator 2005-050B. The United States Space Command assigned it the Satellite Catalog Number 28916.

It was the third orbital plane in orbital slot 24. It is no longer in the GLONASS constellation.

== See also ==
- List of Kosmos satellites (2251–2500)
- List of Proton launches (2000–2009)
