= Kosmos 2402 =

Russian GLONASS navigation satellite

- Mission type: Navigation
- Operator: Russian Space Forces
- COSPAR ID: 2003-056B
- SATCAT no.: 28113

Spacecraft properties
- Spacecraft: GC 794
- Spacecraft type: Uragan
- Manufacturer: Reshetnev ISS

Start of mission
- Launch date: December 10, 2003, 17:42 UTC
- Rocket: Proton-K/Briz-M
- Launch site: Baikonur, Site 81/24

Orbital parameters
- Reference system: Geocentric
- Regime: Medium Earth orbit
- Slot: 2

Kosmos 2402 (Russian: Космос 2402 meaning Cosmos 2402) is one of a set of three Russian military satellites launched in 2003 as part of the GLONASS satellite navigation system. It was launched with Kosmos 2403 and Kosmos 2404.

This satellite is a GLONASS satellite, also known as Uragan, and is numbered Uragan No. 794.

Kosmos 2402 / 2403 / 2404 were launched from Site 81/24 at Baikonur Cosmodrome in Kazakhstan. A Proton-K carrier rocket with a Blok DM upper stage was used to perform the launch which took place at 17:42 UTC on 10 December 2003. The launch successfully placed the satellites into Medium Earth orbit. It subsequently received its Kosmos designation, and the International Designator 2003-056B. The United States Space Command assigned it the Satellite Catalog Number 28113.

It was in the first orbital plane in orbital slot 2. It is no longer part of the GLONASS constellation.

== See also ==
- List of Kosmos satellites (2251–2500)
- List of Proton launches (2000–2009)
