= Kosmos 2413 =

Russian navigation satellite

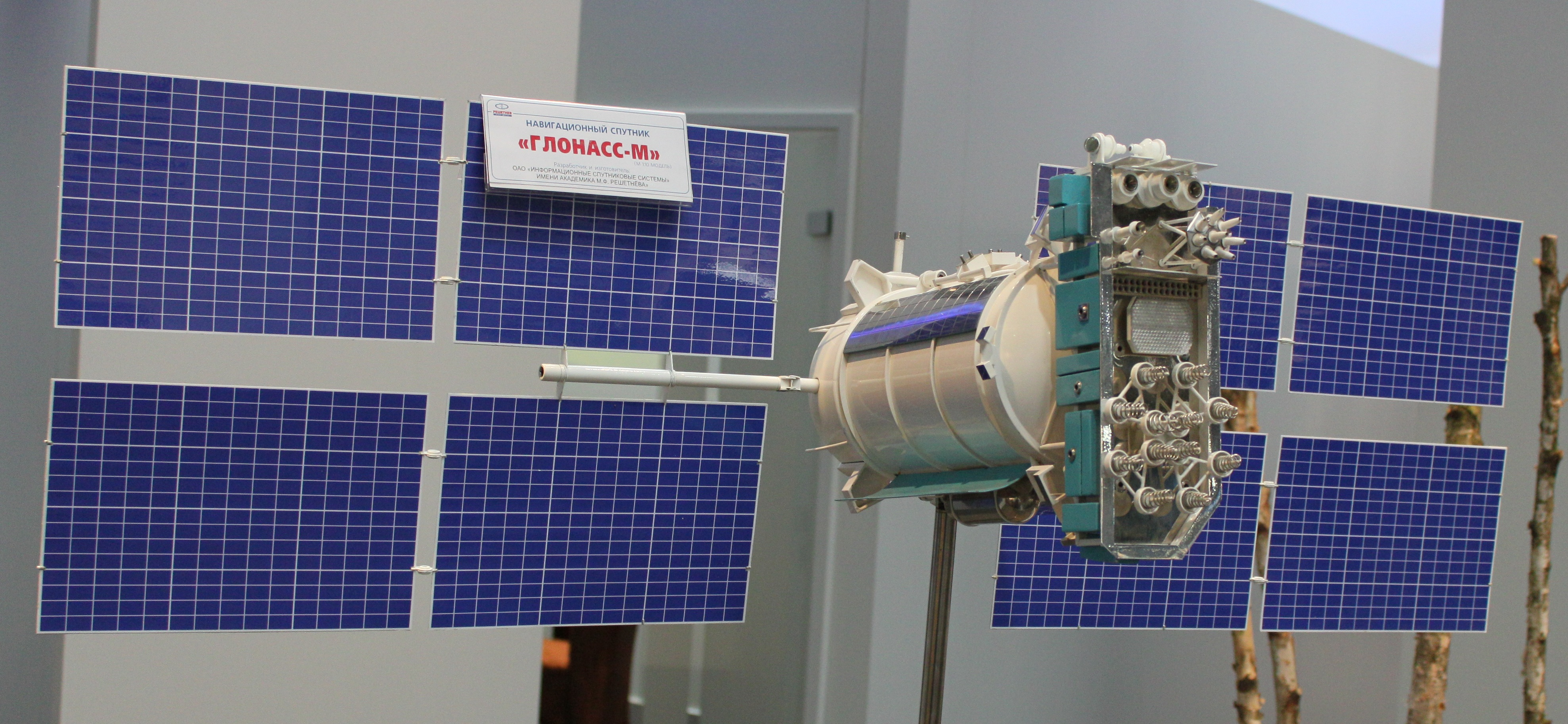
- Mission type: Navigation
- Operator: Russian Space Forces
- COSPAR ID: 2004-053B
- SATCAT no.: 28509

Spacecraft properties
- Spacecraft: GC 712
- Spacecraft type: Uragan-M
- Manufacturer: Reshetnev ISS
- Launch mass: 1415 kg
- Dimensions: 1.3 metres (4 ft 3 in) diameter
- Power: 1540 watts

Start of mission
- Launch date: December 26, 2004, 13:53 UTC
- Rocket: Proton-K/DM-2
- Launch site: Baikonur, Site 200/39
- Entered service: 7 October 2005

End of mission
- Deactivated: 22 November 2012

Orbital parameters
- Reference system: Geocentric
- Regime: Medium Earth orbit
- Slot: 17

Kosmos 2413 (Russian: Космос 2413 meaning Cosmos 2413) is one of a set of three Russian military satellites launched in 2004 as part of the GLONASS satellite navigation system. It was launched with Kosmos 2411 and Kosmos 2412. NORAD apparently call this satellite Kosmos 2411, and instead call Kosmos 2411 Kosmos 2413.

This satellite is a GLONASS-M satellite, also known as Uragan-M, and is numbered Uragan-M No. 712.

Kosmos 2411 / 2412 / 2413 were launched from Site 200/39 at Baikonur Cosmodrome in Kazakhstan. A Proton-K carrier rocket with a Blok DM upper stage was used to perform the launch which took place at 13:53 UTC on 26 December 2004. The launch successfully placed the satellites into Medium Earth orbit. It subsequently received its Kosmos designation, and the International Designator 2004-053B. The United States Space Command assigned it the Satellite Catalog Number 28509.

It is in the first orbital plane in orbital slot 17. It is part of the orbital reserve. It started operation on 7 October 2005 and ended on 22 November 2012.

== See also ==
- List of Kosmos satellites (2251–2500)
- List of Proton launches (2000–2009)
