= Kosmos 2458 =

Russian satellite launched in 2009

- Mission type: Navigation
- Operator: Russian Space Forces
- COSPAR ID: 2009-070C
- SATCAT no.: 36113

Spacecraft properties
- Spacecraft: GC 734
- Spacecraft type: Uragan-M
- Manufacturer: Reshetnev ISS
- Launch mass: 1,415 kilograms (3,120 lb)
- Dimensions: 1.3 metres (4 ft 3 in) diameter
- Power: 1,540 watts

Start of mission
- Launch date: December 14, 2009, 10:38 UTC
- Rocket: Proton-M/DM-2
- Launch site: Baikonur 81/24

Orbital parameters
- Reference system: Geocentric
- Regime: Medium Earth orbit
- Semi-major axis: 25,509 kilometres (15,851 mi)
- Eccentricity: 0.0001
- Perigee altitude: 19,129 kilometres (11,886 mi)
- Apogee altitude: 19,132 kilometres (11,888 mi)
- Inclination: 64.81 degrees
- Period: 675.76 minutes

Kosmos 2458 (Russian: Космос 2458 meaning Cosmos 2458) is one of a set of three Russian military satellites launched in 2009 as part of the GLONASS satellite navigation system. It was launched with Kosmos 2456 and Kosmos 2457.

This satellite is a GLONASS-M satellite, also known as Uragan-M, and is numbered Uragan-M No. 734.

Kosmos 2456/7/8 were launched from Site 81/24 at Baikonur Cosmodrome in Kazakhstan. A Proton-M carrier rocket with a Blok DM upper stage was used to perform the launch which took place at 10:38 UTC on 14 December 2009. The launch successfully placed the satellites into Medium Earth orbit. It subsequently received its Kosmos designation, and the international designator 2009-070C. The United States Space Command assigned it the Satellite Catalog Numbers 36113.

It is in the first orbital plane of the GLONASS constellation, in orbital slot 5. It started operations on 10 January 2010.

== See also ==
- List of Kosmos satellites (2251–2500)
- List of Proton launches (2000–2009)
