= Kosmos 2444 =

Russian navigation military satellite

- Mission type: Navigation
- Operator: Russian Space Forces
- COSPAR ID: 2008-046C
- SATCAT no.: 33380

Spacecraft properties
- Spacecraft: GC 726
- Spacecraft type: Uragan-M
- Manufacturer: Reshetnev ISS
- Launch mass: 1,415 kilograms (3,120 lb)
- Dimensions: 1.3 metres (4 ft 3 in) diameter
- Power: 1,540 watts

Start of mission
- Launch date: September 25, 2008, 08:49 UTC
- Rocket: Proton-M/DM-2
- Launch site: Baikonur 81/24

Orbital parameters
- Reference system: Geocentric
- Regime: Medium Earth orbit

Kosmos 2444 (Russian: Космос 2444 meaning Cosmos 2444) is one of a set of three set of three Russian military satellites launched in 2008 as part of the GLONASS satellite navigation system. It was launched with Kosmos 2442 and Kosmos 2443.

This satellite is a GLONASS-M satellite, also known as Uragan-M, and is numbered Uragan-M No. 726.

Kosmos 2442/3/4 were launched from Site 81/23 at Baikonur Cosmodrome in Kazakhstan. A Proton-M carrier rocket with a Blok DM upper stage was used to perform the launch which took place at 08:49 UTC on 25 September 2008. The launch successfully placed the satellites into Medium Earth orbit. It subsequently received its Kosmos designation, and the international designators 2008-046C. The United States Space Command assigned it the Satellite Catalog Number 33380.

It is no longer part of the GLONASS constellation but was formerly in the third orbital plane, orbital slot 22.

== See also ==
- List of Kosmos satellites (2251–2500)
- List of Proton launches (2000–2009)
