= Kosmos 2435 =

Russian navigation satellite

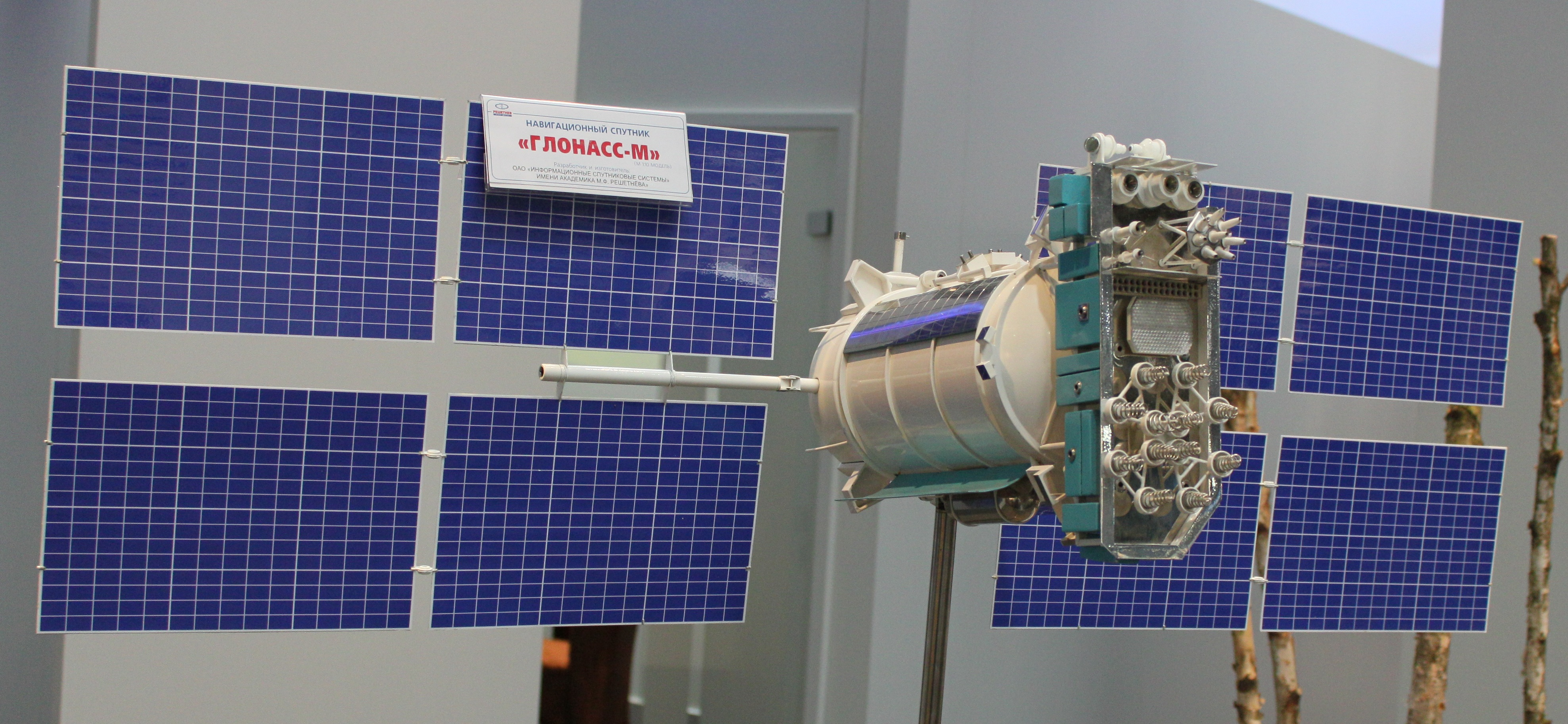
- Mission type: Navigation
- Operator: Russian Space Forces
- COSPAR ID: 2007-065B
- SATCAT no.: 32394

Spacecraft properties
- Spacecraft: GC 722
- Spacecraft type: Uragan-M
- Manufacturer: Reshetnev ISS
- Launch mass: 1415 kg
- Dimensions: 1.3 m diameter
- Power: 1540 watts

Start of mission
- Launch date: December 25, 2007, 19:32 UTC
- Rocket: Proton-M/DM-2
- Launch site: Baikonur, Site 81/24
- Entered service: 25 January 2008

End of mission
- Deactivated: In reserve

Orbital parameters
- Reference system: Geocentric
- Regime: Medium Earth orbit
- Slot: 14

Kosmos 2435 (Russian: Космос 2435 meaning Cosmos 2435) is one of a set of three Russian military satellites launched in 2007 as part of the GLONASS satellite navigation system. It was launched with Kosmos 2434 and Kosmos 2436.

This satellite is a GLONASS-M satellite, also known as Uragan-M, and is numbered Uragan-M No. 722.

Kosmos 2434 / 2435 / 2436 were launched from Site 81/24 at Baikonur Cosmodrome in Kazakhstan. A Proton-M carrier rocket with a Blok DM upper stage was used to perform the launch which took place at 19:32 UTC on 25 December 2007. The launch successfully placed the satellites into Medium Earth orbit. It subsequently received its Kosmos designation, and the international designator 2007-065B. The United States Space Command assigned it the Satellite Catalog Number 32394.

It is not working as part of the GLONASS constellation, but it is part of the orbital reserve. It is in the second plane, orbital slot 14. It started operation on 25 January 2008 and ended operation on 12 October 2011.·

== See also ==
- List of Kosmos satellites (2251–2500)
- List of Proton launches (2000–2009)
