= Kosmos 2419 =

Russian navigation satellite

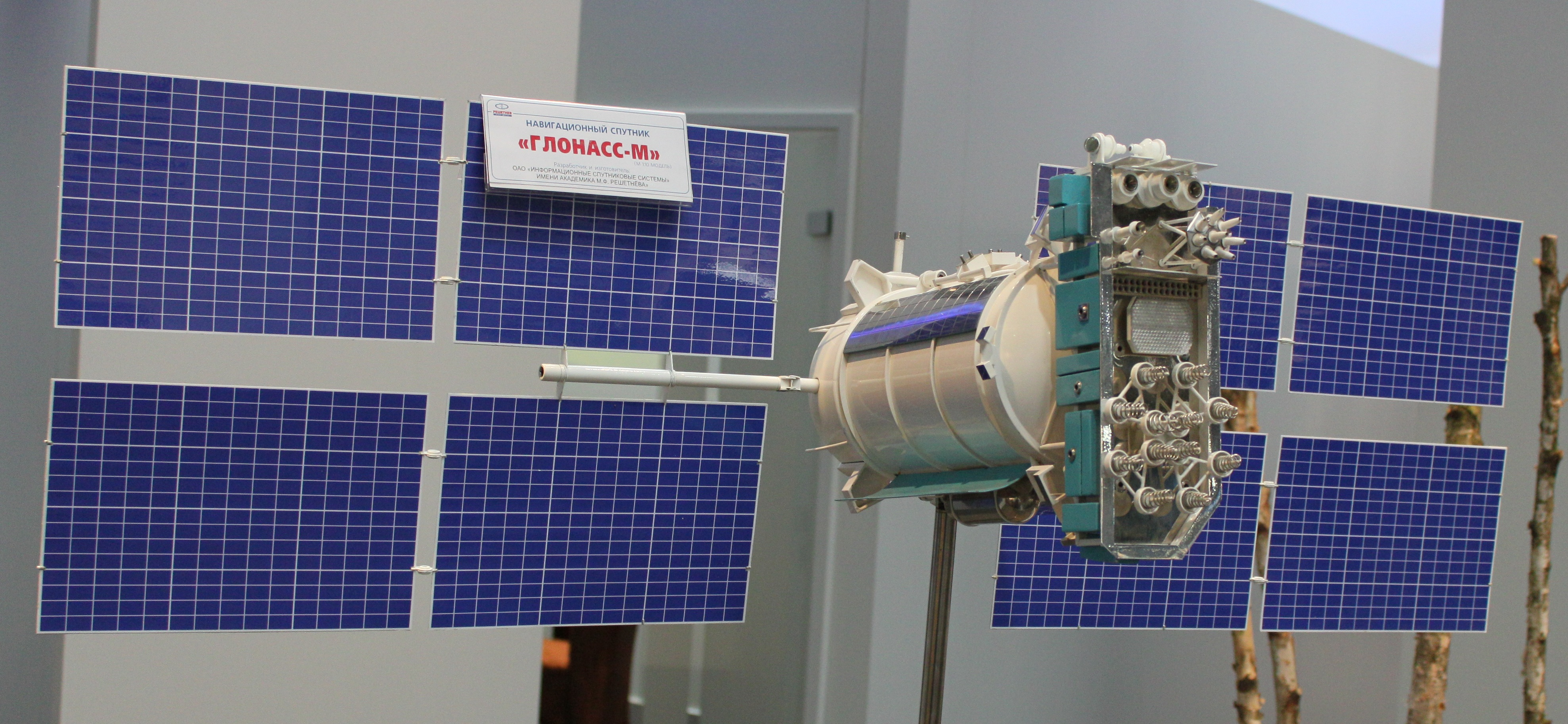
- Mission type: Navigation
- Operator: Russian Space Forces
- COSPAR ID: 2005-050A
- SATCAT no.: 28915

Spacecraft properties
- Spacecraft: GC 714
- Spacecraft type: Uragan-M
- Manufacturer: Reshetnev ISS
- Launch mass: 1415 kg
- Dimensions: 1.3 m diameter
- Power: 1540 watts

Start of mission
- Launch date: December 25, 2005, 05:07 UTC
- Rocket: Proton-K/DM-2
- Launch site: Baikonur, Site 81/24
- Entered service: 31 August 2006

End of mission
- Deactivated: 19 December 2011

Orbital parameters
- Reference system: Geocentric
- Regime: Medium Earth orbit
- Slot: 17

Kosmos 2419 (Russian: Космос 2419 meaning Cosmos 2419) is one of a set of three Russian military satellites launched in 2005 as part of the GLONASS satellite navigation system. It was launched with Kosmos 2417 and Kosmos 2418.

This satellite is a GLONASS-M satellite, also known as Uragan-M. It was assigned GLONASS-M №14L number by the manufacturer and 714 by the Ground Control.

Kosmos 2417 / 2418 / 2419 were launched from Site 81/24 at Baikonur Cosmodrome in Kazakhstan. A Proton-K carrier rocket with a Blok DM upper stage was used to perform the launch which took place at 05:07 UTC on 25 December 2005. The launch successfully placed the satellites into Medium Earth orbit. It subsequently received its Kosmos designation, and the International Designator 2005-050A. The United States Space Command assigned it the Satellite Catalog Number 28915.

It is in the third orbital plane in orbital slot 17. It is part of the orbital reserve. It started operation on 31 August 2006 and ended on 19 December 2011.

== See also ==
- List of Kosmos satellites (2251–2500)
- List of Proton launches (2000–2009)
