= Kosmos 2394 =

Russian GLONASS navigation satellite

- Mission type: Navigation
- Operator: Russian Space Forces
- COSPAR ID: 2002-060A
- SATCAT no.: 27617

Spacecraft properties
- Spacecraft: GC 791
- Spacecraft type: Uragan
- Manufacturer: Reshetnev ISS

Start of mission
- Launch date: December 25, 2002, 07:37 UTC
- Rocket: Proton-K/DM-2M
- Launch site: Baikonur 81/23

Orbital parameters
- Reference system: Geocentric
- Regime: Medium Earth orbit

Kosmos 2394 (Russian: Космос 2394 meaning Cosmos 2394) is one of a set of three Russian military satellites launched in 2002 as part of the GLONASS satellite navigation system. It was launched with Kosmos 2395 and Kosmos 2396.

This satellite is a GLONASS satellite, also known as Uragan, and is numbered Uragan No. 791.

Kosmos 2394/5/6 were launched from Site 81/23 at Baikonur Cosmodrome in Kazakhstan. A Proton-K carrier rocket with a Blok DM upper stage was used to perform the launch which took place at 07:37 UTC on 25 December 2002. The launch successfully placed the satellites into Medium Earth orbit. It subsequently received its Kosmos designation, and the international designator 2002-060A. The United States Space Command assigned it the Satellite Catalog Number 27617.

It was in the third orbital plane in orbital slot 22. It is no longer part of the GLONASS constellation.

== See also ==
- List of Kosmos satellites (2251–2500)
- List of Proton launches (2000–2009)
