= Kosmos 2382 =

Russian GLONASS navigation satellite

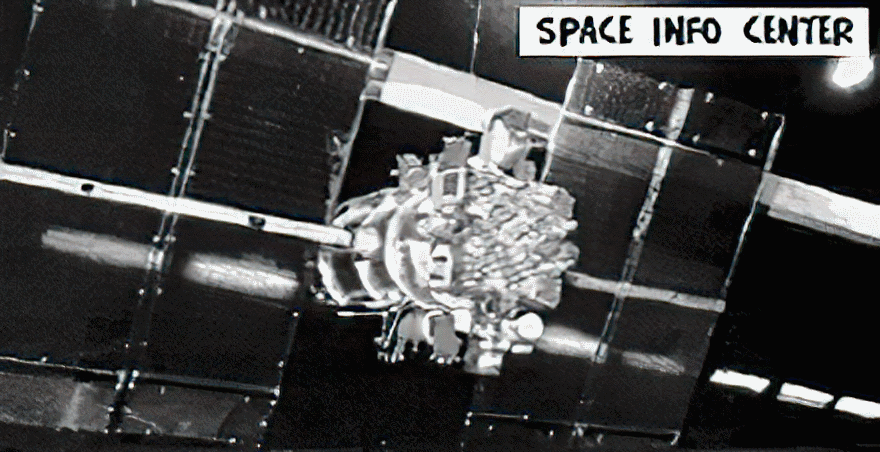
- Mission type: Navigation
- Operator: Russian Space Forces
- COSPAR ID: 2001-053A
- SATCAT no.: 26987
- Mission duration: 4 years, 7 months and 8 days

Spacecraft properties
- Spacecraft: GC 711
- Spacecraft type: Uragan (Block III) or Uragan-M?
- Manufacturer: Reshetnev ISS

Start of mission
- Launch date: December 1, 2001, 18:04 UTC
- Rocket: Proton-K/DM-2
- Launch site: Baikonur 81/24

End of mission
- Disposal: Decommissioned
- Deactivated: July 9, 2006

Orbital parameters
- Reference system: Geocentric
- Regime: Medium Earth orbit

Kosmos 2382 (Russian: Космос 2382 meaning Cosmos 2382) is one of a set of three Russian military satellites launched in 2001 as part of the GLONASS satellite navigation system. It was launched with Kosmos 2380 and Kosmos 2381.

This satellite is a first generation GLONASS satellite with new flight control and power systems. It was incorrectly named Uragan-M in a RIA Novosti news message issued days before the launch. When contacted by Novosti Kosmonavtiki magazine Roscosmos spokesman said all three launched satellites were first generation versions but one of them featured new upgraded flight control and power systems. Its official design life time was 5 years, up from 3 years for the most numerous Block IIv first generation satellites. It was assigned GLONASS №11L number by the manufacturer and 711 by the Ground Control.

Kosmos 2380/1/2 were launched from Site 81/24 at Baikonur Cosmodrome in Kazakhstan. A Proton-K carrier rocket with a Blok DM upper stage was used to perform the launch which took place at 18:04 UTC on 1 December 2001. The launch successfully placed the satellites into Medium Earth orbit. It subsequently received its Kosmos designation, and the international designator 2001-053A. The United States Space Command assigned it the Satellite Catalog Number 26987.

It was in the first orbital plane in orbital slot 5. It was excluded from the active service on July 9, 2006, four years and seven months after the launch but was kept around till January 2008 for testing.

== See also ==
- List of Kosmos satellites (2251–2500)
- List of Proton launches (2000–2009)
