= Kosmos 2442 =

Russian navigation satellite

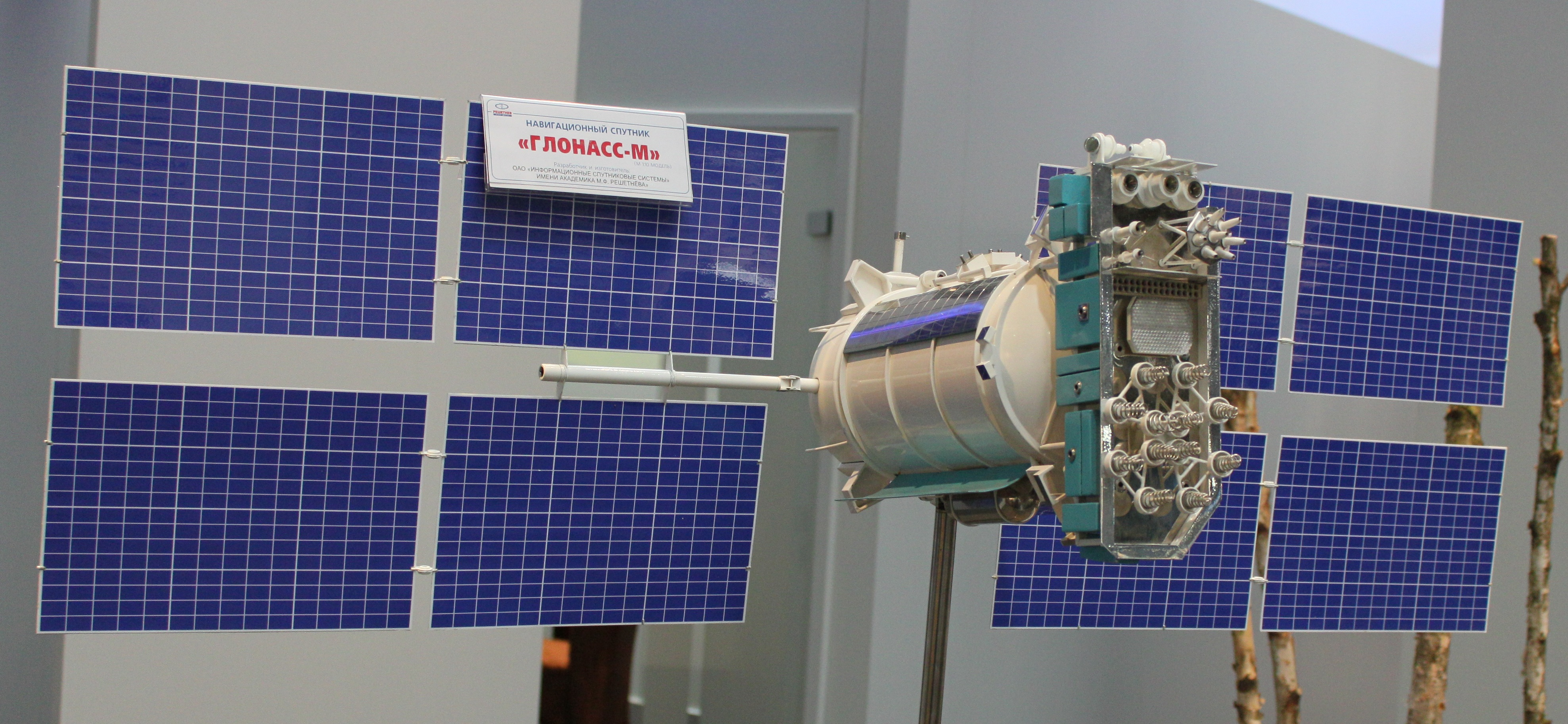
- Mission type: Navigation
- Operator: Russian Space Forces
- COSPAR ID: 2008-046A
- SATCAT no.: 33378

Spacecraft properties
- Spacecraft: GC 724
- Spacecraft type: Uragan-M
- Manufacturer: Reshetnev ISS
- Launch mass: 1,415 kilograms (3,120 lb)
- Dimensions: 1.3 metres (4 ft 3 in) diameter
- Power: 1,540 watts

Start of mission
- Launch date: September 25, 2008, 08:49 UTC
- Rocket: Proton-M/DM-2
- Launch site: Baikonur 81/24

Orbital parameters
- Reference system: Geocentric
- Regime: Medium Earth orbit

Kosmos 2442 (Russian: Космос 2442 meaning Cosmos 2442) is one of a set of three set of three Russian military satellites launched in 2008 as part of the GLONASS satellite navigation system. It was launched with Kosmos 2443 and Kosmos 2444.

This satellite is a GLONASS-M satellite, also known as Uragan-M, and is numbered Uragan-M No. 724.

Kosmos 2442/3/4 were launched from Site 81/23 at Baikonur Cosmodrome in Kazakhstan. A Proton-M carrier rocket with a Blok DM upper stage was used to perform the launch which took place at 08:49 UTC on 25 September 2008. The launch successfully placed the satellites into Medium Earth orbit. It subsequently received its Kosmos designation, and the international designators 2008-046A. The United States Space Command assigned it the Satellite Catalog Number 33378.

It is currently part of the GLONASS constellation in the third orbital plane, orbital slot 18. It started operation on 26 October 2008.

== See also ==
- List of Kosmos satellites (2251–2500)
- List of Proton launches (2000–2009)
