= Kosmos 2425 =

Russian navigation satellite

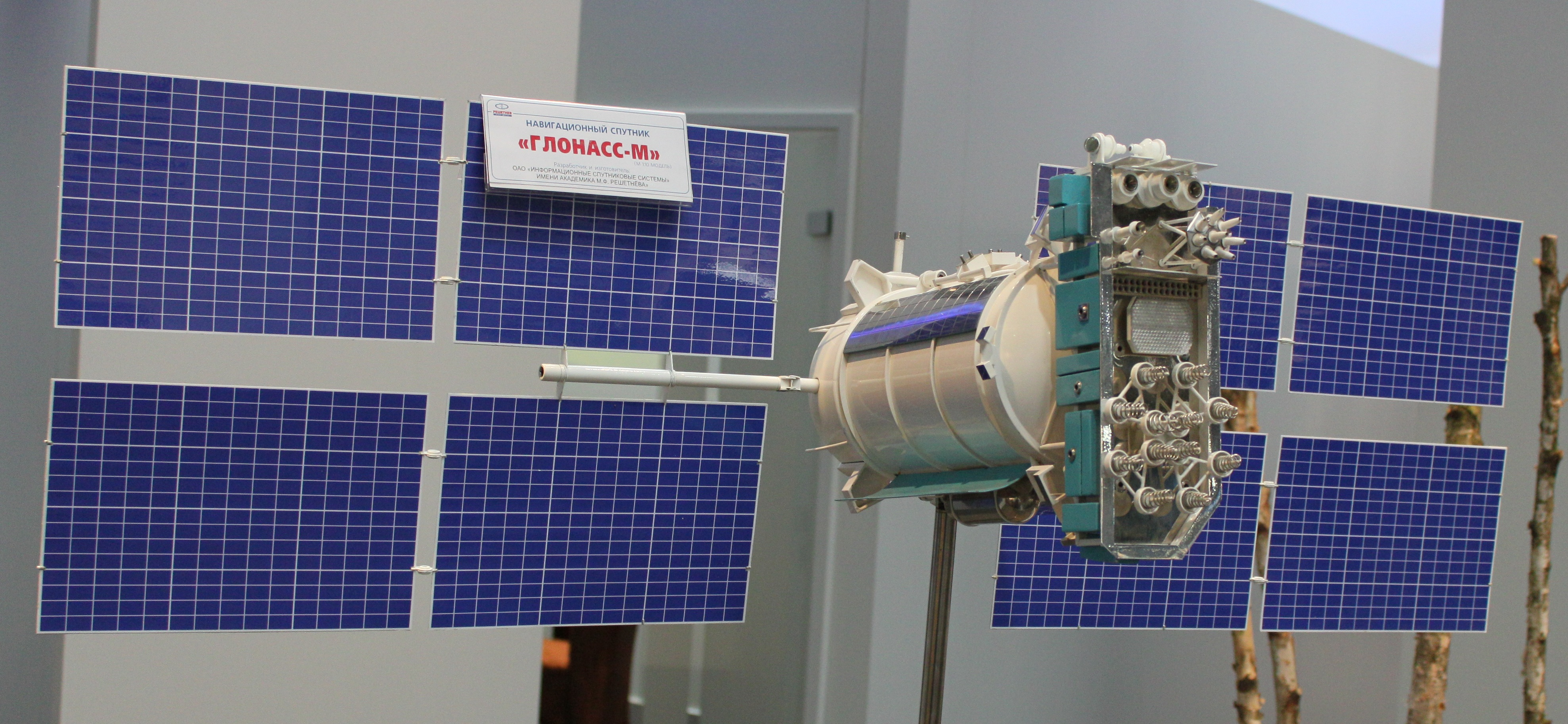
- Mission type: Navigation
- Operator: Russian Space Forces
- COSPAR ID: 2006-062A
- SATCAT no.: 29670

Spacecraft properties
- Spacecraft: GC 716
- Spacecraft type: Uragan-M
- Manufacturer: Reshetnev ISS
- Launch mass: 1415 kg
- Dimensions: 1.3 m diameter
- Power: 1540 watts

Start of mission
- Launch date: December 25, 2006, 20:18 UTC
- Rocket: Proton-K/DM-2
- Launch site: Baikonur, Site 81/24
- Entered service: 12 October 2007

Orbital parameters
- Reference system: Geocentric
- Regime: Medium Earth orbit
- Slot: 15

Kosmos 2425 (Russian: Космос 2425 meaning Cosmos 2425) is one of a set of three Russian military satellites launched in 2006 as part of the GLONASS satellite navigation system. It was launched with Kosmos 2424 and Kosmos 2426.

This satellite is a GLONASS-M satellite, also known as Uragan-M. It was assigned GLONASS-M №16 number by the manufacturer and 716 by the Ground Control.

Kosmos 2424 / 2425 / 2426 were launched from Site 81/24 at Baikonur Cosmodrome in Kazakhstan. A Proton-K carrier rocket with a Blok DM upper stage was used to perform the launch which took place at 20:18 UTC on 25 December 2006. The launch successfully placed the satellites into Medium Earth orbit. It subsequently received its Kosmos designation, and the International Designator 2006-062A. The United States Space Command assigned it the Satellite Catalog Number 29670.

It is in the second orbital plane in orbital slot 15. It started operations on 12 October 2007.·

== See also ==
- List of Kosmos satellites (2251–2500)
- List of Proton launches (2000–2009)
