= Kosmos 2431 =

Russian navigation satellite

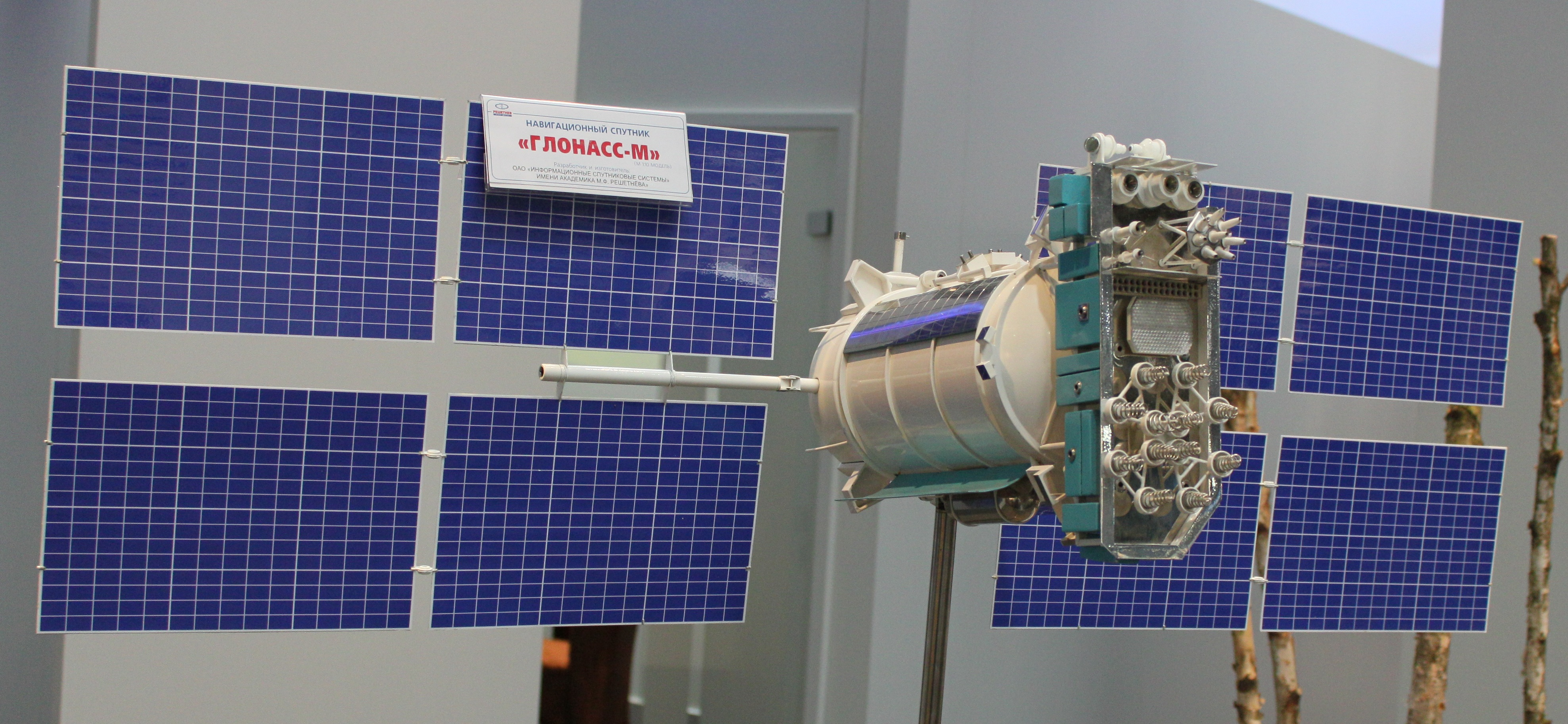
- Mission type: Navigation
- Operator: Russian Space Forces
- COSPAR ID: 2007-052C
- SATCAT no.: 32277

Spacecraft properties
- Spacecraft: GC 718
- Spacecraft type: Uragan-M
- Manufacturer: Reshetnev ISS
- Launch mass: 1415 kg
- Dimensions: 1.3 m diameter
- Power: 1540 watts

Start of mission
- Launch date: October 26, 2007, 07:35 UTC
- Rocket: Proton-K/DM-2
- Launch site: Baikonur, Site 81/24

Orbital parameters
- Reference system: Geocentric
- Regime: Medium Earth orbit
- Slot: 17

Kosmos 2431 (Russian: Космос 2431 meaning Cosmos 2431) is one of a set of three Russian military satellites launched in 2007 as part of the GLONASS satellite navigation system. It was launched with Kosmos 2432 and Kosmos 2433.

This satellite is a GLONASS-M satellite, also known as Uragan-M, and is numbered Uragan-M No. 718.

Kosmos 2431 / 2432 / 2433 were launched from Site 81/24 at Baikonur Cosmodrome in Kazakhstan. A Proton-K carrier rocket with a Blok DM upper stage was used to perform the launch which took place at 07:35 UTC on 26 October 2007. The launch successfully placed the satellites into Medium Earth orbit. It subsequently received its Kosmos designation, and the International Designator 2007-052C. The United States Space Command assigned it the Satellite Catalog Number 32277.

It is no longer part of the GLONASS constellation, but used to be in the third plane, orbital slot 17.·

== See also ==
- List of Kosmos satellites (2251–2500)
- List of Proton launches (2000–2009)
