= Kosmos 2412 =

Russian navigation satellite

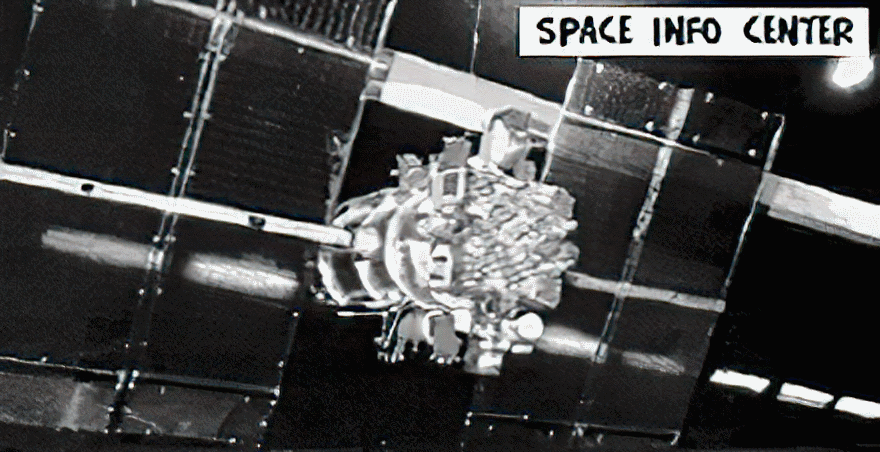
- Mission type: Navigation
- Operator: Russian Space Forces
- COSPAR ID: 2004-053C
- SATCAT no.: 28510
- Mission duration: 3 years, 5 months and 21 days

Spacecraft properties
- Spacecraft: GC 797
- Spacecraft type: Uragan (Block IIv)
- Manufacturer: Reshetnev ISS

Start of mission
- Launch date: December 26, 2004, 13:53 UTC
- Rocket: Proton-K/DM-2
- Launch site: Baikonur, Site 200/39

End of mission
- Disposal: Decommissioned
- Deactivated: June 16, 2008

Orbital parameters
- Reference system: Geocentric
- Regime: Medium Earth orbit
- Slot: 8

Kosmos 2412 (Russian: Космос 2412 meaning Cosmos 2412) is one of a set of three Russian military satellites launched in 2004 as part of the GLONASS satellite navigation system. It was launched with Kosmos 2411 and Kosmos 2413.

This satellite is a GLONASS satellite, also known as Uragan, and is numbered Uragan No. 797.

Kosmos 2411 / 2412 / 2413 were launched from Site 20/39 at Baikonur Cosmodrome in Kazakhstan. A Proton-K carrier rocket with a Blok DM upper stage was used to perform the launch which took place at 13:53 UTC on 26 December 2004. The launch successfully placed the satellites into Medium Earth orbit. It subsequently received its Kosmos designation, and the International Designator 2004-053C. The United States Space Command assigned it the Satellite Catalog Number 28510.

It was in the first orbital plane in orbital slot 8. It is no longer part of the GLONASS constellation.

== See also ==
- List of Kosmos satellites (2251–2500)
- List of Proton launches (2000–2009)
