= Kosmos 2436 =

Russian navigation satellite

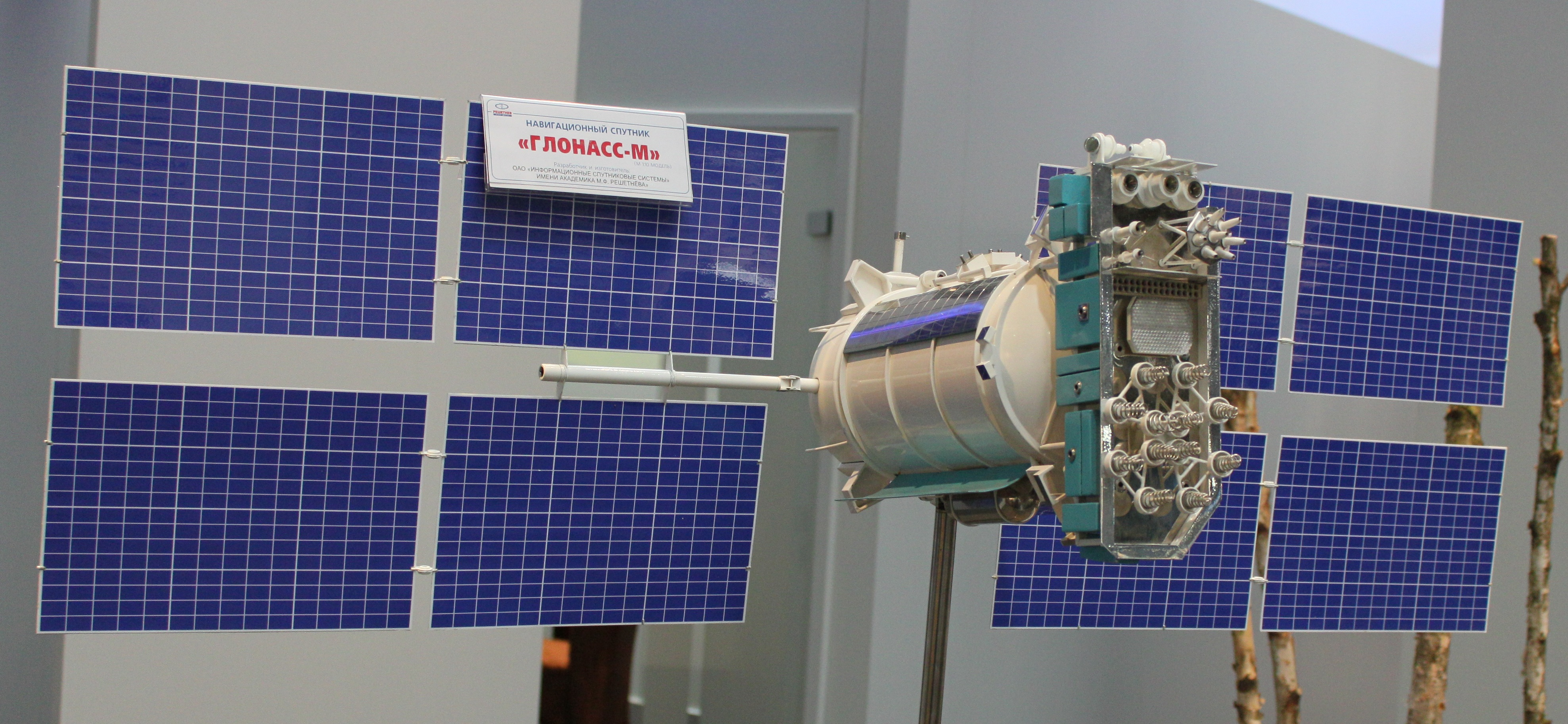
- Mission type: Navigation
- Operator: Russian Space Forces
- COSPAR ID: 2007-065C
- SATCAT no.: 32395

Spacecraft properties
- Spacecraft: GC 723
- Spacecraft type: Uragan-M
- Manufacturer: Reshetnev ISS
- Launch mass: 1,415 kilograms (3,120 lb)
- Dimensions: 1.3 metres (4 ft 3 in) diameter
- Power: 1,540 watts

Start of mission
- Launch date: December 25, 2007, 19:32 UTC
- Rocket: Proton-M/DM-2
- Launch site: Baikonur 81/24

Orbital parameters
- Reference system: Geocentric
- Regime: Medium Earth orbit

Kosmos 2436 (Russian: Космос 2436 meaning Cosmos 2436) is one of a set of three Russian military satellites launched in 2007 as part of the GLONASS satellite navigation system. It was launched with Kosmos 2434 and Kosmos 2435.

This satellite is a GLONASS-M satellite, also known as Uragan-M, and is numbered Uragan-M No. 723.

Kosmos 2434/5/6 were launched from Site 81/24 at Baikonur Cosmodrome in Kazakhstan. A Proton-M carrier rocket with a Blok DM upper stage was used to perform the launch which took place at 19:32 UTC on 25 December 2007. The launch successfully placed the satellites into Medium Earth orbit. It subsequently received its Kosmos designation, and the international designator 2007-065C. The United States Space Command assigned it the Satellite Catalog Number 32395.

It is part of the GLONASS constellation, in the second plane, orbital slot 11. It started operation on 22 January 2008.

== See also ==
- List of Kosmos satellites (2251–2500)
- List of Proton launches (2000–2009)
