= Kosmos 2417 =

Russian navigation satellite

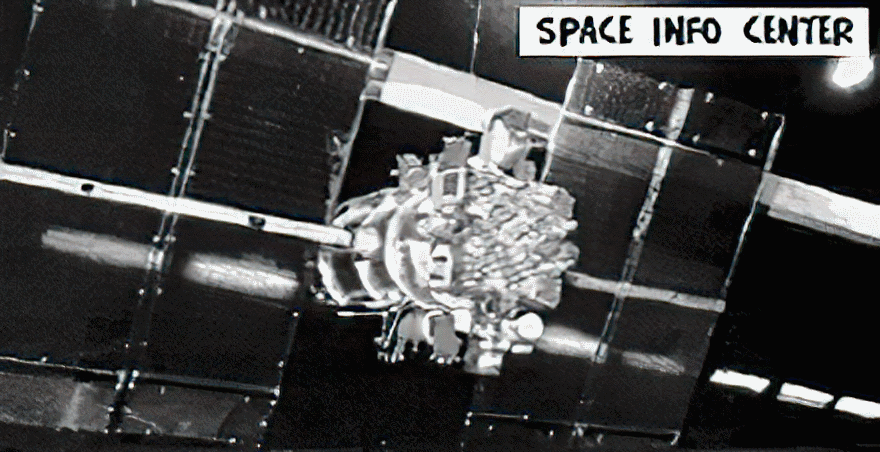
- Mission type: Navigation
- Operator: Russian Space Forces
- COSPAR ID: 2005-050C
- SATCAT no.: 28917

Spacecraft properties
- Spacecraft: GC 798
- Spacecraft type: Uragan (Block IIv)
- Manufacturer: Reshetnev ISS

Start of mission
- Launch date: December 25, 2005, 05:07 UTC
- Rocket: Proton-K/DM-2
- Launch site: Baikonur, Site 81/24

Orbital parameters
- Reference system: Geocentric
- Regime: Medium Earth orbit
- Slot: 22

Kosmos 2417 (Russian: Космос 2417 meaning Cosmos 2417) is one of a set of three Russian military satellites launched in 2005 as part of the GLONASS satellite navigation system. It was launched with Kosmos 2418 and Kosmos 2419.

This satellite is a GLONASS satellite, and was the last one to be launched. Subsequent launches were GLONASS-M, and the two satellites it launched with were also GLONASS-M. GLONASS satellites are also known as Uragan, and it is numbered Uragan No. 798.

Kosmos 2417 / 2418 / 2419 were launched from Site 81/24 at Baikonur Cosmodrome in Kazakhstan. A Proton-K carrier rocket with a Blok DM upper stage was used to perform the launch which took place at 05:07 UTC on 25 December 2005. The launch successfully placed the satellites into Medium Earth orbit. It subsequently received its Kosmos designation, and the International Designator 2005-050C. The United States Space Command assigned it the Satellite Catalog Number 28917.

It was the third orbital plane in orbital slot 22 and is no longer part of the GLONASS constellation.

== See also ==
- List of Kosmos satellites (2251–2500)
- List of Proton launches (2000–2009)
