= GLONASS (first-generation satellites) =

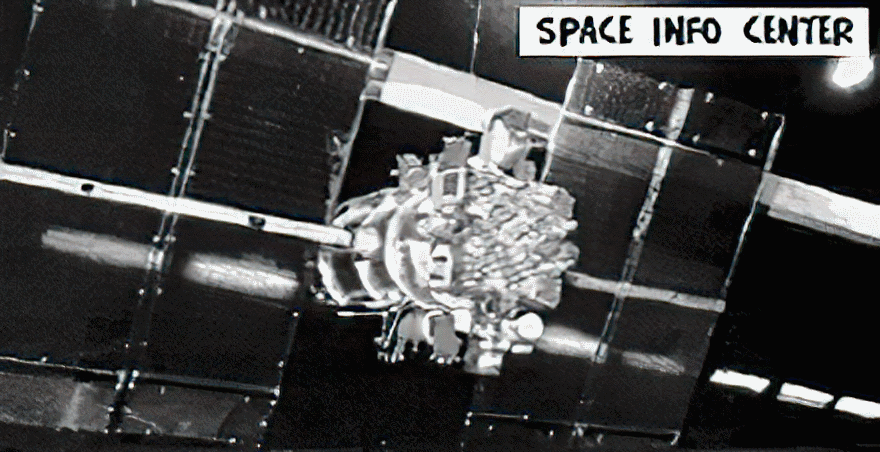
- Manufacturer: Production Corporation Polyot
- Designer: ISS Reshetnev, Grigory Chernyavsky
- Country of origin: Russia
- Operator: JSC «Navigation-Information Systems»
- Applications: Navigation

Specifications
- Bus: 3-Axis stabilized Uragan
- Constellation: GLONASS
- Launch mass: 1,413 kg (3,115 lb)
- Power: 1000 W
- Batteries: NiH_{2}
- Equipment: 2 Cs clocks FDMA signals: L1OF, L1SF and L2SF; Space Laser Ranging
- Regime: MEO
- Design life: 3 years

Production
- Status: Retired
- Built: 88
- Launched: 88
- Operational: 0
- Retired: 82
- Lost: 6
- Maiden launch: 12 October 1982
- Last launch: 25 December 2005
- Last retirement: 30 April 2009

GLONASS (Russian: ГЛОНАСС-М), also known as Uragan (Russian: Ураган) (GRAU Index 11F654) are the first generation of Uragan satellite used as part of the Russian GLONASS radio-based satellite navigation system. Developed by Reshetnev Information Satellite Systems, it had its debut launch on 12 October 1982, with the last launched unit on 25 December 2005 and the retirement of the last unit Kosmos 2403 on 30 April 2009. It has been superseded by the GLONASS-M (GRAU Index 11F654M), the second-generation satellites.

== Design ==
It used a 3-axis stabilized pressurized bus with two solar panels, a propulsion module and a payload module. It weighs 1,413 kg (3,115 lb) generates 1000W of power and had a limited design life of 3 years, but it was extended to 5 years in later models. It had a strict requirement of keeping the internal temperature at ±1 °C. The previous design used an embedded liquid cooling system that weighted 340 kg (750 lb). The Uragan implemented a gaseous cooling system that put most of the heat generating parts on the outside of the pressure vessel, simplifying the system and weighing just 40 kg (88 lb).

The Uragan-M are usually launched in trios, and due to the close distance, the radios of the three would interfere with each other, meaning that the ground segment can only command one satellite at a time. Setting sun pointing attitude for power and then Earth pointing attitude for communications for a single unit takes about 5 hours. Since the radio contact window with ground control is between 4 and 6 hours, ground control can not control all spacecraft in a single pass. The onboard computer in the Uragan-M can put the spacecraft in sun pointing mode autonomously, and does many of the start up processes so the ground segment can take control and process the Earth pointing mode.

The payload consisted of 3 L-Band navigation signals in 25 channels separated by 0.5625 MHz intervals in 2 frequency bands: 1602.5625 - 1615.5 MHz and 1240 - 1260 MHz. EIRP 25 to 27 dBW. Right hand circular polarized. It transmits the FDMA signals L1OF, L1SF and L2SF. It uses 2 Cs clocks with a clock stability of 5 × 10^{−13}. And includes retroreflector for accurate orbit assessment by laser ranging.

== Versions ==
The first generation Uragan spacecraft were created under ban of foreign radiation-hardened components and thus had an inferior expected design life of just 1 year. Throughout the years the design was gradually improved to last up to 5 years:

- Uragan Block I: First batch of 10 satellites. Only has an expected design life of 1 year, but averaged 14 months. Where launched between 1982 and 1985.
- Uragan Block IIa: Second batch of 9 satellites. Same design life as Block I, but averaged 17 months. Added new time and frequency standards and improved clock stability by an order of magnitude. Launched between 1985 and 1989.
- Uragan Block IIb: Third batch of 12 satellite. Had a 2-year design life time and averaged 22 months. Two launch failures meant that only 6 were operational. Launched between 1987 and 1988.
- Uragan Block IIv: The most numerous batch of the Uragan design, it had 56 units built and launched. The initial design life was 3 years but later enhancements on radiation hardening increased that to 5 years. Launched between 1988 and 2005.
- Uragan Block III: Transitional to GLONASS-M version with new flight control and power systems. This version was incorrectly named Uragan-M in a RIA Novosti news message issued days before the launch. When contacted by Novosti Kosmonavtiki magazine Roscosmos spokesman said all three launched satellites were first generation versions but one of them featured new upgraded flight control and power systems. The official design life was declared to be 5 years. Novosti Kosmonavtiki also pointed out the fact that GLONASS-M project had been approved on August 20, 2001, just three months before Kosmos 2382 launch. Only one Block III satellite with manufacturer number No.11L was produced.

Block I, II, and III nomenclature was introduced in Western publications. In Russian publications both Block I and II are known as 11F654 while Block III is known as 14F17.

== GLONASS launches ==
Satellite	Launch (UTC)	Carrier rocket	Launch site	Satellite type	Launch Block No.	SC s/n	Orbital Plane	Slot	Retired	Remarks
Kosmos 1413	12 October 1982; 14:57	Proton-K; DM-2	Baikonur, 200/39	I	1	711	I	1	12 January 1984	
Kosmos 1490	10 August 1983; 18:24	Proton-K/DM-2	Baikonur 200/39	I	2	712	I	3	5 July 1984	
Kosmos 1491	10 August 1983; 18:24	Proton-K/DM-2	Baikonur 200/39	I	2	713	I	2	27 September 1984	
Kosmos 1519	29 December 1983; 00:52	Proton-K/DM-2	Baikonur 200/40	I	3	714	III	18	27 September 1984	
Kosmos 1520	29 December 1983; 00:52	Proton-K/DM-2	Baikonur 200/40	I	3	715	III	17	30 June 1986	
Kosmos 1554	19 May 1984; 15:11	Proton-K/DM-2	Baikonur 200/40	I	4	716	III	19	16 August 1985	
Kosmos 1555	19 May 1984; 15:11	Proton-K/DM-2	Baikonur 200/40	I	4	717	III	18	25 October 1985	
Kosmos 1593	4 September 1984; 15:49	Proton-K/DM-2	Baikonur 200/40	I	5	718	I	2	28 November 1985	
Kosmos 1594	4 September 1984; 15:49	Proton-K/DM-2	Baikonur 200/40	I	5	719	I	3	4 September 1986	
Kosmos 1650	17 May 1985; 22:28	Proton-K/DM-2	Baikonur 200/39	I	6	720	I	1	8 November 1985	
Kosmos 1651	17 May 1985; 22:28	Proton-K/DM-2	Baikonur 200/39	IIa	6	721	I	1	9 August 1987	
Kosmos 1710	24 December 1985; 21:43	Proton-K/DM-2	Baikonur 200/39	IIa	7	722	III	18	28 February 1987	
Kosmos 1711	24 December 1985; 21:43	Proton-K/DM-2	Baikonur 200/39	IIa	7	723	III	17	16 May 1987	
Kosmos 1778	16 September 1986; 11:38	Proton-K/DM-2	Baikonur 200/39	IIa	8	724	I	2	20 February 1987	
Kosmos 1779	16 September 1986; 11:38	Proton-K/DM-2	Baikonur 200/39	IIa	8	725	I	3	15 July 1988	
Kosmos 1780	16 September 1986; 11:38	Proton-K/DM-2	Baikonur 200/39	IIa	8	726	I	8	15 June 1988	
Kosmos 1838	24 April 1987; 12:42	Proton-K/DM-2	Baikonur 200/40	IIb	9	730			N/A	Failed to reach correct orbit
Kosmos 1839	24 April 1987; 12:42	Proton-K/DM-2	Baikonur 200/40	IIb	9	731			N/A	Failed to reach correct orbit
Kosmos 1840	24 April 1987; 12:42	Proton-K/DM-2	Baikonur 200/40	IIb	9	732			N/A	Failed to reach correct orbit
Kosmos 1883	16 September 1987; 02:53	Proton-K/DM-2	Baikonur 200/40	IIb	10	733	III	-	6 June 1989	
Kosmos 1884	16 September 1987; 02:53	Proton-K/DM-2	Baikonur 200/40	IIb	10	734	III	-	30 August 1988	
Kosmos 1885	16 September 1987; 02:53	Proton-K/DM-2	Baikonur 200/40	IIb	10	735	III	17	1 February 1989	
Kosmos 1917	17 February 1988; 00:23	Proton-K/DM-2	Baikonur 200/39	IIb	11	738			N/A	Failed to reach correct orbit
Kosmos 1918	17 February 1988; 00:23	Proton-K/DM-2	Baikonur 200/39	IIb	11	737			N/A	Failed to reach correct orbit
Kosmos 1919	17 February 1988; 00:23	Proton-K/DM-2	Baikonur 200/39	IIb	11	736			N/A	Failed to reach correct orbit
Kosmos 1946	21 May 1988; 17:57	Proton-K/DM-2	Baikonur 200/39	IIb	12	739	I	7	10 May 1990	
Kosmos 1947	21 May 1988; 17:57	Proton-K/DM-2	Baikonur 200/39	IIb	12	740	I	8	19 March 1991	
Kosmos 1948	21 May 1988; 17:57	Proton-K/DM-2	Baikonur 200/39	IIb	12	741	I	1	11 June 1991	
Kosmos 1970	16 September 1988; 02:00	Proton-K/DM-2	Baikonur 200/39	IIv	13	742	III	17	21 May 1990	
Kosmos 1971	16 September 1988; 02:00	Proton-K/DM-2	Baikonur 200/39	IIv	13	743	III	18	31 August 1989	
Kosmos 1972	16 September 1988; 02:00	Proton-K/DM-2	Baikonur 200/39	IIv	13	744	III	19	1 November 1991	
Kosmos 1987	10 January 1989; 02:05	Proton-K/DM-2	Baikonur 200/39	IIa	14	727	I	2	14 March 1993	
Kosmos 1988	10 January 1989; 02:05	Proton-K/DM-2	Baikonur 200/39	IIv	14	745	I	3	16 February 1992	
Kosmos 2022	31 May 1989; 08:32	Proton-K/DM-2	Baikonur 200/40	IIa	15	728	III	24	25 January 1990	
Kosmos 2023	31 May 1989; 08:32	Proton-K/DM-2	Baikonur 200/40	IIa	15	729	III	19	18 November 1989	
Kosmos 2079	19 May 1990; 08:32	Proton-K/DM-2	Baikonur 200/40	IIv	16	746	III	17	23 April 1994	
Kosmos 2080	19 May 1990; 08:32	Proton-K/DM-2	Baikonur 200/40	IIv	16	751	III	19	27 July 1994	
Kosmos 2081	19 May 1990; 08:32	Proton-K/DM-2	Baikonur 200/40	IIv	16	752	III	20	18 August 1992	
Kosmos 2109	8 December 1990; 02:43	Proton-K/DM-2	Baikonur 200/40	IIv	17	747	I	7	17 March 1994	
Kosmos 2110	8 December 1990; 02:43	Proton-K/DM-2	Baikonur 200/40	IIv	17	748	I	4	29 October 1993	
Kosmos 2111	8 December 1990; 02:43	Proton-K/DM-2	Baikonur 200/40	IIv	17	749	I	5	9 June 1996	
Kosmos 2139	4 April 1991; 10:47	Proton-K/DM-2	Baikonur 200/39	IIv	18	750	III	22	29 September 1994	
Kosmos 2140	4 April 1991; 10:47	Proton-K/DM-2	Baikonur 200/39	IIv	18	753	III	21	6 January 1992	
Kosmos 2141	4 April 1991; 10:47	Proton-K/DM-2	Baikonur 200/39	IIv	18	754	III	24	26 February 1992	
Kosmos 2177	29 January 1992; 22:19	Proton-K/DM-2	Baikonur 81/23	IIv	19	768	I	3	9 January 1993	
Kosmos 2178	29 January 1992; 22:19	Proton-K/DM-2	Baikonur 81/23	IIv	19	769	I	8	23 May 1997	
Kosmos 2179	29 January 1992; 22:19	Proton-K/DM-2	Baikonur 81/23	IIv	19	771	I	1	25 October 1996	
Kosmos 2204	30 July 1992; 01:59	Proton-K/DM-2	Baikonur 81/23	IIv	20	756	III	18	27 June 1997	
Kosmos 2205	30 July 1992; 01:59	Proton-K/DM-2	Baikonur 81/23	IIv	20	772	III	21	29 June 1994	
Kosmos 2206	30 July 1992; 01:59	Proton-K/DM-2	Baikonur 81/23	IIv	20	774	III	24	18 May 1996	
Kosmos 2234	17 February 1993; 20:09	Proton-K/DM-2	Baikonur 81/23	IIv	21	773	I	2	9 March 1994	
Kosmos 2235	17 February 1993; 20:09	Proton-K/DM-2	Baikonur 81/23	IIv	21	759	I	6	30 June 1997	
Kosmos 2236	17 February 1993; 20:09	Proton-K/DM-2	Baikonur 81/23	IIv	21	757	I	3	27 July 1997	
Kosmos 2275	11 April 1994; 07:49	Proton-K/DM-2	Baikonur 81/23	IIv	22	758	III	18	5 March 1999	
Kosmos 2276	11 April 1994; 07:49	Proton-K/DM-2	Baikonur 81/23	IIv	22	760	III	17	30 July 1999	
Kosmos 2277	11 April 1994; 07:49	Proton-K/DM-2	Baikonur 81/23	IIv	22	761	III	23	24 July 1997	
Kosmos 2287	11 August 1994; 15:27	Proton-K/DM-2	Baikonur 81/23	IIv	23	767	II	12	5 November 1998	
Kosmos 2288	11 August 1994; 15:27	Proton-K/DM-2	Baikonur 81/23	IIv	23	770	II	14	24 August 1999	
Kosmos 2289	11 August 1994; 15:27	Proton-K/DM-2	Baikonur 81/23	IIv	23	775	II	16	13 August 2000	
Kosmos 2294	20 November 1994; 00:39	Proton-K/DM-2	Baikonur 200/39	IIv	24	762	I	4	4 September 1999	
Kosmos 2295	20 November 1994; 00:39	Proton-K/DM-2	Baikonur 200/39	IIv	24	763	I	3	27 July 1999	
Kosmos 2296	20 November 1994; 00:39	Proton-K/DM-2	Baikonur 200/39	IIv	24	764	I	6	27 October 1999	
Kosmos 2307	7 March 1995; 09:23	Proton-K/DM-2	Baikonur 200/39	IIv	25	765	III	20	10 September 1999	
Kosmos 2308	7 March 1995; 09:23	Proton-K/DM-2	Baikonur 200/39	IIv	25	766	III	22	21 November 2000	
Kosmos 2309	7 March 1995; 09:23	Proton-K/DM-2	Baikonur 200/39	IIv	25	777	III	19	17 July 1997	
Kosmos 2316	24 July 1995; 15:52	Proton-K/DM-2	Baikonur 200/39	IIv	26	780	II	15	3 December 1998	
Kosmos 2317	24 July 1995; 15:52	Proton-K/DM-2	Baikonur 200/39	IIv	26	781	II	10	24 January 2001	
Kosmos 2318	24 July 1995; 15:52	Proton-K/DM-2	Baikonur 200/39	IIv	26	785	II	11	3 February 2001	
Kosmos 2323	14 December 1995; 06:10	Proton-K/DM-2	Baikonur 200/39	IIv	27	776	II	9	13 August 2000	
Kosmos 2324	14 December 1995; 06:10	Proton-K//DM-2	Baikonur 200/39	IIv	27	778	II	15	29 January 2001	
Kosmos 2325	14 December 1995; 06:10	Proton-K/DM-2	Baikonur 200/39	IIv	27	782	II	13	23 July 2001	
Kosmos 2362	30 December 1998; 18:35	Proton-K/DM-2	Baikonur 200/39	IIv	28	786	I	7	20 October 2003	
Kosmos 2363	30 December 1998; 18:35	Proton-K/DM-2	Baikonur 200/39	IIv	28	784	I	8	19 December 2003	
Kosmos 2364	30 December 1998; 18:35	Proton-K/DM-2	Baikonur 200/39	IIv	28	779	I	1	8 July 2002	
Kosmos 2374	13 October 2000; 14:12	Proton-K/DM-2	Baikonur 81/24	IIv	29	783	III	18	23 November 2007	
Kosmos 2375	13 October 2000; 14:12	Proton-K/DM-2	Baikonur 81/24	IIv	29	787	III	17	16 April 2007	
Kosmos 2376	13 October 2000; 14:12	Proton-K/DM-2	Baikonur 81/24	IIv	29	788	III	24	29 March 2006	
Kosmos 2380	1 December 2001; 18:04	Proton-K/DM-2	Baikonur 81/24	IIv	30	790	I	6	19 December 2003	
Kosmos 2381	1 December 2001; 18:04	Proton-K/DM-2	Baikonur 81/24	IIv	30	789	I	3	11 January 2008	
Kosmos 2382	1 December 2001; 18:04	Proton-K/DM-2	Baikonur 81/24	III	30	711	I	5	11 January 2008	with upgraded flight control and power systems
Kosmos 2394	25 December 2002; 07:37	Proton-K/DM-2	Baikonur 81/23	IIv	31	791	III	22	30 November 2007	
Kosmos 2395	25 December 2002; 07:37	Proton-K/DM-2	Baikonur 81/23	IIv	31	792	III	21	12 January 2008	
Kosmos 2396	25 December 2002; 07:37	Proton-K/DM-2	Baikonur 81/23	IIv	31	793	III	23	16 April 2007	
Kosmos 2402	10 December 2003; 13:53	Proton-K/Briz-M	Baikonur 81/24	IIv	32	794	I	2	20 April 2007	
Kosmos 2403	10 December 2003; 13:53	Proton-K/Briz-M	Baikonur 81/24	IIv	32	795	I	4	30 April 2009	
Kosmos 2411	26 December 2004; 13:53	Proton-K/DM-2	Baikonur 200/39	IIv	33	796	I	1	18 October 2008	
Kosmos 2412	26 December 2004; 13:53	Proton-K/DM-2	Baikonur 200/39	IIv	33	797	I	8	16 October 2008	
Kosmos 2417	25 December 2005; 05:07	Proton-K/DM-2	Baikonur 81/24	IIv	34	798	III	22	12 January 2008	

=== Satellites by version ===
Version	Launched	Retired	Launch Failures
Uragan Block I	10	10	0
Uragan Block IIa	9	9	0
Uragan Block IIb	12	6	6
Uragan Block IIv	56	56	0
Uragan Block III	1	1	0
Total	88	82	6
