= List of R-7 launches (2020–2024) =

This is a list of launches made by the R-7 Semyorka ICBM, and its derivatives between 2020 and 2024. All launches are orbital satellite launches, unless stated otherwise.

== Launch statistics ==
=== Rocket configurations ===
- Soyuz-2.1a
- Soyuz-2.1b
- Soyuz-2.1v
- Soyuz-STA
- Soyuz-STB

=== Launch sites ===
- Baikonur Site 1/5
- Baikonur Site 31/6
- Plesetsk Site 43/3
- Plesetsk Site 43/4
- Vostochny Site 1S
- Guiana ELS

=== Launch outcomes ===
- Failure
- Partial failure
- Success
- Scheduled

== Launch history ==
=== 2020 ===
Flight No.	Date / time (UTC)	Rocket, Configuration	Launch site	Payload	Payload mass	Orbit	Customer	Launch outcome
ST-27	6 February 2020, 21:42:41	Soyuz-2.1b / Fregat-M (14A14B)	Site 31/6, Baikonur	OneWeb x 34			OneWeb	Success
ST-27	Low Earth orbit communication satellites							
	20 February 2020, 08:24:54	Soyuz-2.1a / Fregat-M (14A14A)	Site 43/3, Plesetsk	Meridian 9				Success
Military Communications satellite
	16 March 2020, 18:28:10	Soyuz-2.1b / Fregat-M (14A14B)	Site 43/4, Plesetsk	Kosmos 2535 (GLONASS-M)				Success
Navigation satellite
ST-28	21 March 2020, 17:06:58	Soyuz-2.1b / Fregat-M (14A14B)	Site 31/6, Baikonur	OneWeb x 34			OneWeb	Success
ST-28	Low Earth orbit communication satellites							
	9 April 2020, 08:05:06	Soyuz-2.1a (14A14A)	Site 31/6, Baikonur	Soyuz MS-16				Success
Piloted flight with three cosmonauts, ISS Expedition 62/63. First flight of the Soyuz-2 rocket series for a crew mission.
	25 April 2020, 01:51:41	Soyuz-2.1a (14A14A)	Site 31/6, Baikonur	Progress MS-14				Success
ISS logistics
	22 May 2020, 07:31:17	Soyuz-2.1b / Fregat-M (14A14B)	Site 43/4, Plesetsk	Kosmos 2546 (EKS-4/Tundra 14L)				Success
Early warning satellite
	23 July 2020, 14:26:21	Soyuz-2.1a (14A14A)	Site 31/6, Baikonur	Progress MS-15				Success
ISS logistics
	28 September 2020, 11:20:32	Soyuz-2.1b / Fregat-M (14A14B)	Site 43/4, Plesetsk	Gonets-M x 3, 20 microsatellites				Success
Low Earth orbit communication satellites
	14 October 2020, 05:45:04	Soyuz-2.1a (14A14A)	Site 31/6, Baikonur	Soyuz MS-17				Success
Piloted flight with three cosmonauts, ISS Expedition 63/64.
	25 October 2020, 19:08:42	Soyuz-2.1b / Fregat-M (14A14B)	Site 43/4, Plesetsk	Kosmos 2547 (GLONASS-K 15L)				Success
Navigation satellite
VS-24	2 December 2020, 01:33:28	Soyuz-ST-A / Fregat-M (14A14A)	ELS, Guiana	FalconEye 2				Success
VS-24	Earth observation satellite							
	3 December 2020, 01:14:36	Soyuz-2.1b / Fregat-M (14A14B)	Site 43/3, Plesetsk	Gonets-M x 3, Kosmos 2458				Success
Low Earth orbit communication satellites
ST-29	18 December 2020, 12:26:26	Soyuz-2.1b / Fregat (14A14B)	Site 1S, Vostochny	OneWeb × 36			OneWeb	Success
ST-29	Low Earth orbit communication satellites							
VS-25	29 December 2020, 16:42:07	Soyuz-ST-A / Fregat (14A14A)	ELS, Guiana	CSO-2			CNES; DGA	Success
VS-25	Reconnaissance satellite							
=== 2021 ===
Flight No.	Date / time (UTC)	Rocket, Configuration	Launch site	Payload	Payload mass	Orbit	Customer	Launch outcome
	2 February 2021, 20:45:28	Soyuz-2.1b (14A14B)	Site 43/4, Plesetsk	Kosmos 2549 (Lotos-S1 №4)	6000 kg	LEO	VKS	Success
ELINT satellite
	15 February 2021, 04:45:05	Soyuz-2.1a (14A14A)	Site 31/6, Baikonur	Progress MS-16	2460 kg	LEO (ISS)	Roscosmos	Success
ISS logistics
	28 February 2021, 06:55:01	Soyuz-2.1b / Fregat-M (14A14B)	Site 31/6, Baikonur	Arktika-M №1	2100 kg	Molniya	Roscosmos	Success
Weather satellite
	22 March 2021; 06:07:12	Soyuz-2.1a / Fregat-M (14A14A)	Site 31/6, Baikonur	CAS500-1, 37 rideshare payloads		SSO		Success
38 satellites from 18 different countries, including the first Tunisian satellite.
ST-30	25 March 2021; 02:47:33	Soyuz-2.1b / Fregat (14A14B)	Site 1S, Vostochny	OneWeb × 36	5310 kg	LEO	OneWeb	Success
ST-30	Low Earth orbit communication satellites							
	9 April 2021; 07:42:40	Soyuz-2.1a (14A14A)	Site 31/6, Baikonur	Soyuz MS-18	7080 kg	LEO (ISS)	Roscosmos	Success
Piloted flight with three cosmonauts, ISS Expedition 65/66
ST-31	25 April 2021; 22:14:08	Soyuz-2.1b / Fregat (14A14B)	Site 1S, Vostochny	OneWeb × 36	5310 kg	LEO	OneWeb	Success
ST-31	Low Earth orbit communication satellites							
ST-32	28 May 2021; 17:38:39	Soyuz-2.1b / Fregat (14A14B)	Site 1S, Vostochny	OneWeb × 36	5310 kg	LEO	OneWeb	Success
ST-32	Low Earth orbit communication satellites							
	25 June 2021, 19:50:00	Soyuz-2.1b (14A14B)	Site 43/4, Plesetsk	Kosmos 2550 (Pion-NKS №1)	6500 kg	SSO	VKS	Success
SIGINT satellite
	29 June 2021, 23:27:20	Soyuz-2.1a (14A14A)	Site 31/6, Baikonur	Progress MS-17	2900 kg	LEO (ISS)	Roscosmos	Success
ISS logistics
ST-33	1 July 2021; 12:48:33	Soyuz-2.1b / Fregat (14A14B)	Site 1S, Vostochny	OneWeb × 36	5310 kg	LEO	OneWeb	Success
ST-33	Low Earth orbit communication satellites							
ST-34	21 August 2021; 22:13:40	Soyuz-2.1b / Fregat (14A14B)	Site 31/6, Baikonur	OneWeb × 34	5022 kg	LEO	OneWeb	Success
ST-34	Low Earth orbit communication satellites							
	9 September 2021; 19:59:47	Soyuz-2.1v (14A15)	Site 43/4, Plesetsk	Kosmos 2551 (EMKA №2)		SSO	Ministry of Defence	Success
Reconnaissance satellite
ST-35	14 September 2021; 18:07:19	Soyuz-2.1b / Fregat (14A14B)	Site 31/6, Baikonur	OneWeb × 34	5022 kg	LEO	OneWeb	Success
ST-35	Low Earth orbit communication satellites							
	5 October 2021; 08:55:02	Soyuz-2.1a (14A14A)	Site 31/6, Baikonur	Soyuz MS-19	7080 kg	LEO (ISS)	Roscosmos	Success
Piloted flight with three cosmonauts including Russian actress Yulia Peresild and filmmaker Klim Shipenko, ISS Expedition 66/67
ST-36	14 October 2021; 09:40:10	Soyuz-2.1b / Fregat (14A14B)	Site 1S, Vostochny	OneWeb × 36	5310 kg	LEO	OneWeb	Success
ST-36	Low Earth orbit communication satellites							
	28 October 2021; 00:00:32	Soyuz-2.1a (14A14A)	Site 31/6, Baikonur	Progress MS-18	7000 kg	LEO (ISS)	Roscosmos	Success
ISS logistics
	24 November 2021; 13:06:35	Soyuz-2.1b (14A14B)	Site 31/6, Baikonur	Progress M-UM, Prichal	8180 kg (5350 kg Prichal)	LEO (ISS)	Roscosmos	Success
ISS assembly
	25 November 2021; 01:09:13	Soyuz-2.1b / Fregat (14A14B)	Site 43/4, Plesetsk	Kosmos 2552 (EKS-5, Tundra 15L)		Tundra	Ministry of Defence	Success
Early warning satellite
VS-26	5 December 2021; 00:19:20	Soyuz-ST-B / Fregat-MT (14A14B)	ELS, Kourou	Galileo FOC FM23; Galileo FOC FM24	1645 kg	MEO	ESA	Success
VS-26	Navigation satellites							
	8 December 2021; 07:38:15	Soyuz-2.1a (14A14A)	Site 31/6, Baikonur	Soyuz MS-20	7080 kg	LEO (ISS)	Roscosmos	Success
Piloted flight with three cosmonauts including two tourists.
ST-37	27 December 2021; 13:10:37	Soyuz-2.1b / Fregat (14A14B)	Site 31/6, Baikonur	OneWeb × 36	5310 kg	LEO	OneWeb	Success
ST-37	Low Earth orbit communication satellites							
=== 2022 ===
Flight No.	Date / time (UTC)	Rocket, Configuration	Launch site	Payload	Payload mass	Orbit	Customer	Launch outcome
	5 February 2022; 07:00:00	Soyuz-2.1a / Fregat (14A14A)	Site 43/4, Plesetsk	Kosmos 2553		LEO	VKS	Success
Military satellite
VS-27	10 February 2022; 18:09:37	Soyuz-ST-B / Fregat-MT (14A14B)	ELS, Guiana	OneWeb × 34	5,495 kg	LEO	OneWeb	Success
VS-27	Low Earth orbit communication satellites. Final Soyuz launch from Guiana.							
	15 February 2022; 04:25:39	Soyuz-2.1a (14A14A)	Site 31/6, Baikonur	Progress MS-19	7,000 kg	LEO (ISS)	Roscosmos	Success
ISS logistics
	18 March 2022; 15:55:18	Soyuz-2.1a (14A14A)	Site 31/6, Baikonur	Soyuz MS-21	7,080 kg	LEO (ISS)	Roscosmos	Success
Piloted flight with three cosmonauts, ISS Expedition 67/68
	22 March 2022; 12:48:22	Soyuz-2.1a / Fregat (14A14A)	Site 43/4, Plesetsk	Meridian-M 10 (20L)		Molniya	RVSN RF	Success
Military communications satellite
	7 April 2022; 11:20:18	Soyuz-2.1b (14A14B)	Site 43/3, Plesetsk	Kosmos 2554 (Lotos-S1 №5)		LEO	RVSN RF	Success
ELINT satellite
	19 May 2022; 08:03:32	Soyuz-2.1a (14A14A)	Site 43/4, Plesetsk	Kosmos 2556 (Bars-M 3L)	4,000 kg	SSO	RVSN RF	Success
Reconnaissance satellite
	3 June 2022; 09:32:16	Soyuz-2.1a (14A14A)	Site 31/6, Baikonur	Progress MS-20	7,000 kg	LEO (ISS)	Roscosmos	Success
ISS logistics
	7 July 2022; 09:18:06	Soyuz-2.1b / Fregat (14A14B)	Site 43/4, Plesetsk	Kosmos 2557 (GLONASS-K 16L)	935 kg	MEO	VKS	Success
Navigation satellite
	1 August 2022; 20:25:48	Soyuz-2.1v / Volga (14A15)	Site 43/4, Plesetsk	Kosmos 2558 (Nivelir №3)		SSO	Ministry of Defence	Success
Surveillance satellite
	9 August 2022; 05:52:38	Soyuz-2.1b / Fregat (14A14B)	Site 31/6, Baikonur	Khayyam, 16 rideshare cubesats		LEO		Success
Earth observation satellite
	21 September 2022; 13:54:49	Soyuz-2.1a (14A14A)	Site 31/6, Baikonur	Soyuz MS-22	7,080 kg	LEO (ISS)	Roscosmos	Success
Piloted flight with three cosmonauts, ISS Expedition 68/69
	10 October 2022; 02:52:32	Soyuz-2.1b / Fregat (14A14B)	Site 43/3, Plesetsk	Kosmos 2559 (GLONASS-K 17L)	935–974 kg	MEO	VKS	Success
Navigation satellite
	21 October 2022; 19:20:15	Soyuz-2.1v / Volga (14A15)	Site 43/4, Plesetsk	Kosmos 2561 & 2562		SSO	VKS	Success
Surveillance satellite
	22 October 2022; 19:57:09	Soyuz-2.1b / Fregat (14A14B)	Site 1S, Vostochny	Gonets-M 23/24/25; Skif-D	950 kg	LEO	Gonets Satellite System; Roscosmos	Success
Communication satellites
	26 October 2022 00:20:09	Soyuz-2.1a (14A14A)	Site 31/6, Baikonur	Progress MS-21	7000 kg	LEO (ISS)	Roscosmos	Success
ISS logistics
	2 November 2022; 06:47:48	Soyuz-2.1b / Fregat (14A14B)	Site 43/4, Plesetsk	Kosmos 2563 (EKS-6, Tundra 16L)		Tundra	Ministry of Defence	Success
Early warning satellite
	28 November 2022; 15:13:50	Soyuz-2.1b / Fregat (14A14B)	Site 43/3, Plesetsk	Kosmos 2564 (GLONASS-M 761)	1,415 kg	MEO	VKS	Success
Navigation satellite
	30 November 2022; 21:10:25	Soyuz-2.1b (14A14B)	Site 43/4, Plesetsk	Kosmos 2565 (Lotos-S1 №6), Kosmos 2566		LEO	Ministry of Defence	Success
ELINT satellite
=== 2023 ===
Flight No.	Date / time (UTC)	Rocket, Configuration	Launch site	Payload	Payload mass	Orbit	Customer	Launch outcome
	9 February 2023; 06:15:36	Soyuz-2.1a (14A14A)	Baikonur, Site 31/6	Progress MS-22	7,280 kg	LEO (ISS)	Roscosmos	Success
ISS logistics
	24 February 2023; 00:04:29	Soyuz-2.1a (14A14A)	Baikonur, Site 31/6	Soyuz MS-23	7,050 kg	LEO (ISS)	Roscosmos	Success
Unpiloted flight to replace the damaged Soyuz MS-22 spacecraft
	23 March 2023; 06:40:11	Soyuz-2.1a (14A14A)	Plesetsk, Site 43/3	Kosmos 2567 (Bars-M 4L)	4,000 kg	SSO	VKS	Success
Reconnaissance satellite
	29 March 2023; 19:57:02	Soyuz-2.1v (14A15)	Plesetsk, Site 43/4	Kosmos 2568 (EO MKA №4)		SSO	VKS	Success
Technology demonstration
	24 May 2023; 12:56:07	Soyuz-2.1a (14A14A)	Baikonur, Site 31/6	Progress MS-23	7,280 kg	LEO (ISS)	Roscosmos	Success
ISS logistics
	26 May 2023; 21:14:51	Soyuz-2.1a / Fregat (14A14A)	Vostochny, Site 1S	Kondor-FKA №1	1,050 kg	LEO	Roscosmos	Success
Reconnaissance satellite
	27 June 2023; 13:34:49	Soyuz-2.1b / Fregat (14A14B)	Vostochny, Site 1S	Meteor-M №2-3; 42 rideshare satellites	2,750 kg	SSO	Roscosmos	Success
Weather satellite
	7 August 2023; 13:19:25	Soyuz-2.1b / Fregat (14A14B)	Plesetsk, Site 43/3	Kosmos 2569 (GLONASS-K2 13L)	1,642 kg	MEO	VKS	Success
Navigation satellite
	10 August 2023; 23:10:57	Soyuz-2.1b / Fregat (14A14B)	Vostochny, Site 1S	Luna 25 (Luna-Glob lander)	1,800 kg	TLI	IKI RAN	Success
Lunar lander
	23 August 2023; 01:08:10	Soyuz-2.1a (14A14A)	Baikonur, Site 31/6	Progress MS-24	7,400 kg	LEO (ISS)	Roscosmos	Success
ISS logistics
	15 September 2023; 15:44:35	Soyuz-2.1a (14A14A)	Baikonur, Site 31/6	Soyuz MS-24	7,152 kg	LEO (ISS)	Roscosmos	Success
Piloted flight with three cosmonauts, ISS Expedition 69/70
	27 October 2023; 06:04:43	Soyuz-2.1b (14A14B)	Plesetsk, Site 43/3	Kosmos 2570 (Lotos-S1 №7), undisclosed payload		LEO	VKS	Success
ELINT satellite
	25 November 2023; 20:58:06	Soyuz-2.1b (14A14B)	Plesetsk, Site 43/4	Kosmos 2571		SSO	VKS	Success
Undisclosed satellite
	1 December 2023; 09:25:11	Soyuz-2.1a (14A14A)	Baikonur, Site 31/6	Progress MS-25	7,400 kg	LEO (ISS)	Roscosmos	Success
ISS logistics
	16 December 2023, 09:17:48	Soyuz-2.1b / Fregat-M (14A14B)	Baikonur, Site 31/6	Arktika-M №2	2077 kg	Molniya	Roscosmos	Success
Weather satellite
	21 December 2023; 08:48:39	Soyuz-2.1b (14A14B)	Plesetsk, Site 43/4	Kosmos 2573 (Bars-M 5L)	4,000 kg	SSO	VKS	Success
Reconnaissance satellite
	27 December 2023; 07:03:44	Soyuz-2.1v (14A15)	Plesetsk, Site 43/4	Kosmos 2574 (Razbeg No.1)		SSO	VKS	Success
Reconnaissance satellite
=== 2024 ===
Flight No.	Date / time (UTC)	Rocket, Configuration	Launch site	Payload	Payload mass	Orbit	Customer	Launch outcome
	9 February 2024; 07:03:44	Soyuz-2.1v (14A15)	Plesetsk, Site 43/4	Kosmos 2575 (Razbeg No.2)		SSO	VKS	Success
Reconnaissance satellite
	15 February 2024; 03:25:05	Soyuz-2.1a (14A14A)	Baikonur, Site 31/6	Progress MS-26	7,400 kg	LEO (ISS)	Roscosmos	Success
ISS logistics
	29 February 2024; 05:43:26	Soyuz-2.1b / Fregat (14A14B)	Vostochny, Site 1S	Meteor-M №2-4 + 18 rideshare satellites	2,750 kg	SSO	Roscosmos	Success
Weather satellite
	23 March 2024; 12:36:10	Soyuz-2.1a (14A14A)	Baikonur, Site 31/6	Soyuz MS-25	7,152 kg	LEO (ISS)	Roscosmos	Success
Piloted flight with three cosmonauts, ISS Expedition 70/71
	31 March 2024; 09:36:45	Soyuz-2.1b (14A14B)	Baikonur, Site 31/6	Resurs-P №4	5,920 kg	SSO	Roscosmos	Success
Earth observation satellite
	16 May 2024; 21:21:39	Soyuz-2.1b / Fregat-M (14A14B)	Plesetsk, Site 43/4	Kosmos 2576		SSO	VKS	Success
Undisclosed satellite + 6 rideshares
	30 May 2024; 09:42:59	Soyuz-2.1a (14A14A)	Baikonur, Site 31/6	Progress MS-27	7,000 kg	LEO (ISS)	Roscosmos	Success
ISS Logistics
	15 August 2024; 03:20:17	Soyuz-2.1a (14A14A)	Baikonur, Site 31/6	Progress MS-28	7,280 kg	LEO (ISS)	Roscosmos	Success
ISS Logistics
	11 September 2024; 16:23:12	Soyuz-2.1a (14A14A)	Baikonur, Site 31/6	Soyuz MS-26	7,050 kg	LEO (ISS)	Roscosmos	Success
Piloted flight with three cosmonauts, ISS Expedition 71/72
	31 October 2024; 07:51:31	Soyuz-2.1a (14A14A)	Plesetsk, Site 43/4	Kosmos 2579 (Bars-M 6L)		SSO	VKS	Success
Reconnaissance satellite
	4 November 2024; 23:18:40	Soyuz-2.1b / Fregat-M (14A14B)	Vostochny, Site 1S	Ionosfera-M №1-2 + 53 rideshare satellites		SSO	VKS	Success
Ionospheric research
	21 November 2024; 12:22:23	Soyuz-2.1a (14A14A)	Baikonur, Site 31/6	Progress MS-29	7,280 kg	LEO (ISS)	Roscosmos	Success
ISS Logistics
	29 November 2024; 21:50:25	Soyuz-2.1a / Fregat-M (14A14A)	Vostochny, Site 1S	Kondor-FKA №2	1,100 kg	SSO	Roscosmos	Success
Reconnaissance satellite.
	4 December 2024; 18:03:13	Soyuz-2.1b (14A14B)	Plesetsk, Site 43/4	Kosmos 2580 (Lotos-S1 No.8)	6,000 kg	LEO	VKS	Success
ELINT satellite.
	25 December 2024; 07:45:42	Soyuz-2.1b (14A14B)	Baikonur, Site 31/6	Resurs-P №5	6,570 kg	SSO	Roscosmos	Success
Earth observation satellite. 2,000th R-7 family rocket launched.
