= Nauka =

Nauka (transliterated from Наука, meaning Science in Russian) may refer to

- Nauka (journal), a journal of the Polish Academy of Sciences
- Nauka (publisher), previously known at the USSR Academy of Science Publisher, a Russian academic publisher
- Nauka (ISS module), also known as Multipurpose Laboratory Module, a module for the International Space Station
