= UGATUSAT =

Russian microsatellite (2009-2010)

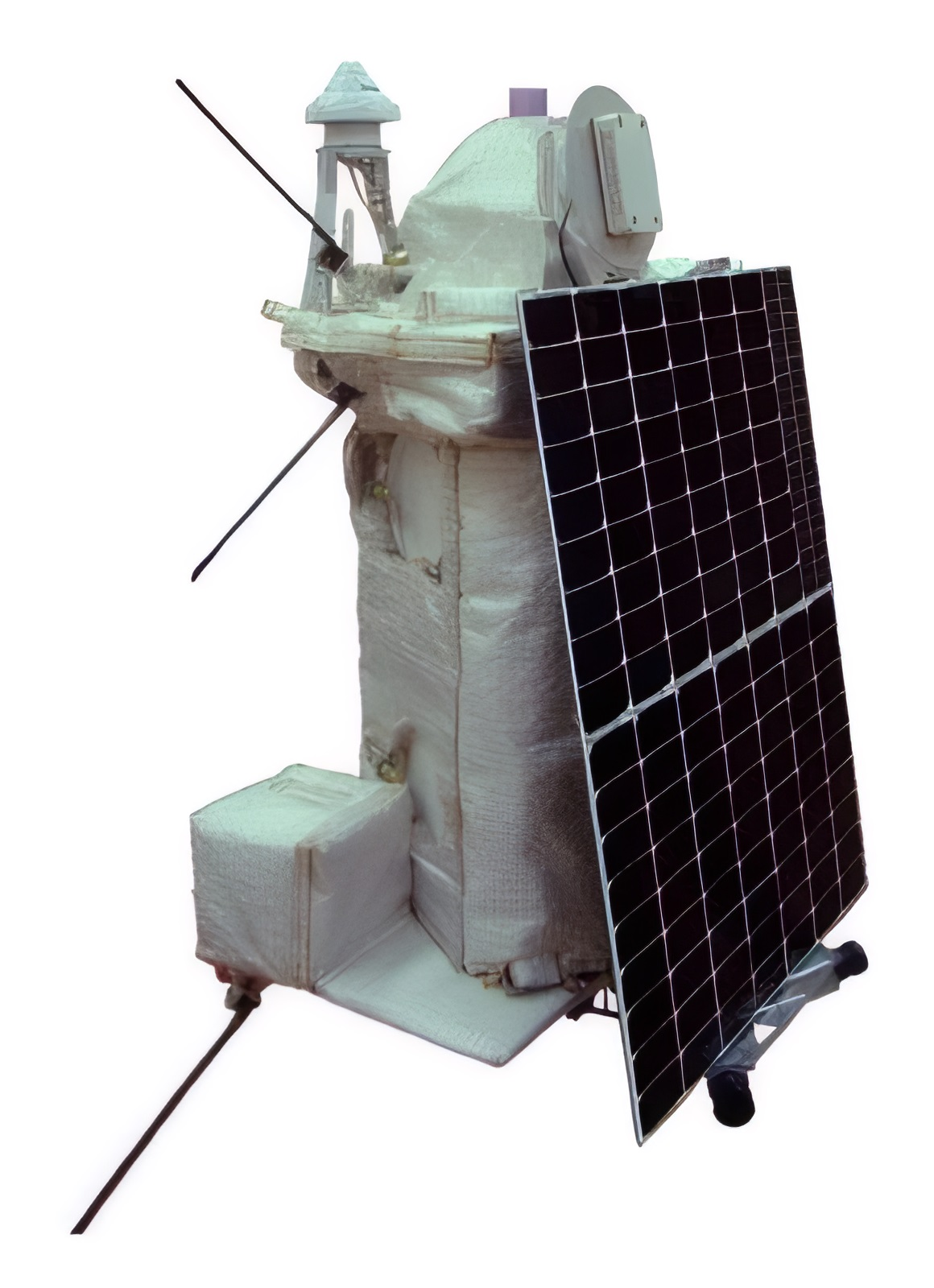
- Mission type: Earth observation Technology
- Operator: USATU
- COSPAR ID: 2009-049E
- SATCAT no.: 35869

Spacecraft properties
- Launch mass: 40 kilograms (88 lb)

Start of mission
- Launch date: 17 September 2009, 15:55:07 UTC
- Rocket: Soyuz-2-1b/Fregat
- Launch site: Baikonur Site 31/6

End of mission
- Last contact: 13 February 2010

Orbital parameters
- Reference system: Geocentric
- Regime: Low Earth

UGATUSAT (УГАТУ-САТ, an abbreviation of the Russian name verbatim – «Ufimskiy Gosudarstvenniy Aviatsionniy Tekhnicheskiy Universitet Satellite») was a Russian microsatellite which was built and operated by Ufa State Aviation Technical University (USATU). The satellite was intended to be used as a technology demonstrator, and for Earth observation.

== Overview ==
The microsatellite UGATUSAT was developed by the Student Bureau "Infocosmos" at Ufa State Aviation Technical University, with an expected operational lifetime of three years. The satellite was equipped with a multi-channel multispectral camera that had a resolution of 50 meters per pixel. It was anticipated that the Space Educational and Scientific Laboratory, established as part of the university's educational program, would utilize UGATUSAT to:

- Conduct environmental monitoring
- Analyze parameters of mineral extraction
- Track forest fires and medium-scale fires
- Observe river flooding
- Monitor temperature anomalies, chemical emissions into the atmosphere, and emergency oil spills.

The mass of the UGATUSAT microsatellite was 40 kg.

== Launch ==
Initially, UGATUSAT was scheduled to launch on 19 June 2009 aboard a Kosmos-3M carrier rocket from Launch Complex 107 at Kapustin Yar. However, the launch was postponed, and UGATUSAT was eventually launched as a secondary payload on a Soyuz-2 rocket. On 17 September 2009 at 19:55 Moscow time, the educational microsatellite UGATUSAT was launched into space from Baikonur Cosmodrome. The launch, originally planned for 15 September 2009, was delayed due to weather conditions.

== Mission ==
On 30 December 2009, communication with UGATUSAT was lost. It is suspected that the satellite experienced a malfunction that affected its gyroscope control moment system, leading to the failure of the spacecraft. The last contact with UGATUSAT occurred on 13 February 2010, after which the mission was formally concluded.
