= Ionosfera-M =

Earth observation satellite system

- Mission type: Earth observation
- Operator: Roscosmos
- Mission duration: 8 years (planned)

Spacecraft properties
- Manufacturer: NPP VNIIEM
- Launch mass: 430 kg (950 lb)

Start of mission
- Launch date: 04 November 2024 (Ionosfera-M №1&2); 25 July 2025 (Ionosfera-M №3&4)
- Rocket: Soyuz-2.1b/Fregat-M
- Launch site: Vostochny, Site 1S
- Contractor: Roscosmos

Orbital parameters
- Reference system: Geocentric orbit
- Regime: Sun-synchronous orbit

Ionosfera-M is a Constellation of four Ionospheric and Magnetospheric research Earth observation satellite system developed by Roscosmos for Project Ionozond.

== Background ==
The Missions of Project Ionozond includes four Ionosfera-M and one Zond Satellite. The function of Ionosfera-M satellites is to monitor the Magnetosphere and Ionosphere, while the function of Zond is to measure Solar Irradiadion.

Zond part of the program was initially planned to fly with the Ionosfera-M Satellites in 2020 to observe Sun. But due to lack of funding is in hold position and possibly cancelled.

Each Ionosfera-M Satellites carries the following instrument:

- SPER/1-Plasma and energy radiation spectrometer
- SG/1-Gamma-ray spectrometer
- GALS/1-Galactic cosmic ray spectrometer / 1
- LAERTES-On-board Ionosonde
- NBK/2-Low-frequency wave complex
- ESEP-Ionospheric plasma energy spectrometer
- Ozonometer-TM Ozonometer
- MayaK-On-board radio transmitters
- PES GPS-GLONASS device

== List of satellites ==
Name	SATCAT	Launch date (UTC)	Launch vehicle	Orbital apsis	Inclination	Period (min)	Status
Ionosfera-M №1	61735	4 November 2024; 23:18:40	Soyuz-2.1b/Fregat-M	821.6 km × 824.7 km	98.7°	101.2	Operational
Ionosfera-M №2	61736	4 November 2024; 23:18:40	Soyuz-2.1b/Fregat-M	822.8 km × 823.6 km	98.7°	101.2	Operational
Ionosfera-M №3	64876	25 July 2025; 05:54:04	Soyuz-2.1b/Fregat-M	825.8 km × 829.1 km	98.6°	101.3	Operational
Ionosfera-M №4	64877	25 July 2025; 05:54:04	Soyuz-2.1b/Fregat-M	826.1 km × 828.8 km	98.6°	101.3	Operational

== See also ==
- Roscosmos
- Arktika-M
- Resurs-P
