= SPACE-π =

The SPACE-π program is a Russian scientific and educational initiative designed to bring students, universities, scientists and private companies together to build small CubeSats. As of 2025, the program has involved over 10,000 students and 30 educational institutions at the secondary and university levels, and has launched 33 satellites.

== History ==
The project was launched at Peter the Great St. Petersburg Polytechnic University in 2021, aiming to “popularize space research, missions, technologies through team solving competitive and applied tasks”, involving school children, university and high school students and graduate students in the process of developing and testing scientific and educational spacecraft for near-Earth orbit. Some of the areas studied are remote sensing and space monitoring of the Earth, investigating various types of radiation and magnetic fields in space and in the ionosphere, and investigating the use of cubesat technologies for communicating with objects on Earth. SPACE-π has involved students from across Russia and from other countries.

== Project description ==
The main uplink site for the project is at Peter the Great St. Petersburg Polytechnic University, where satellite telemetry and data downloads occur. The Russian company Sputnix LLC is responsible for several of the orbital platforms used in the project. The project allows schoolchildren and university students to perform labwork and attend classes with the data gathered during the service life of the orbital platforms. They are also responsible for examining the feasibility of using the technical solutions found on larger-sized spacecraft. They also help write guidelines for conducting space experiments. The various satellites are launched from either the Baikonur Cosmodrome or the Vostochny Cosmodrome aboard Soyuz-2 or Fregat boosters.

Some satellites have been used to develop onboard heliogeophysical and, in particular, magnetometric equipment for future missions.

The program is an initiative of the Planet Duty Program of the Innovation Assistance Fund of the Russian Government, providing funding grants. The various educational institutions are expected to invest an amount similar, or greater than, the government funding towards the satellite's payload and educational activities. The project has shown promising results; “(f)or example, the Geoscan-Edelweiss satellite successfully tested a gas propulsion system for CubeSats for the first time in Russia. The engine, manufactured by the Fakel Design Bureau, successfully passed all tests, proving its suitability for further use in space”.

The program has helped Russia increase the number of cubesat launches; in 2024, the country came in second worldwide for the number of launches with 123 for that year. The efforts of the Space π program have been cited as the reason for the increase.
