= Progress MS-21 =

2022 Russian resupply spaceflight to the ISS

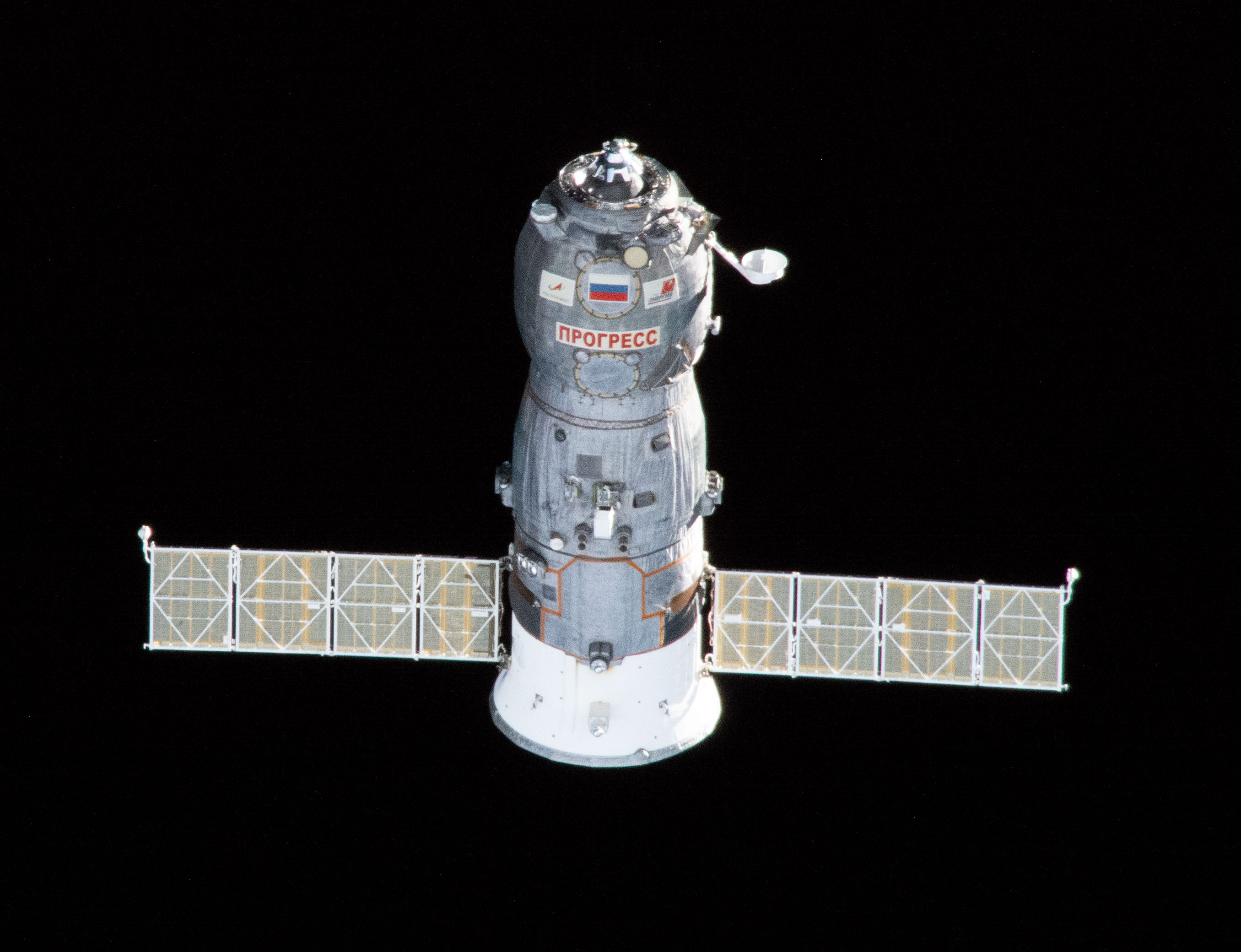
- Progress MS-21 approaches the ISS
- Names: Progress 82P
- Mission type: ISS resupply
- Operator: Roscosmos
- COSPAR ID: 2022-140A
- SATCAT no.: 54155
- Mission duration: 116 days, 2 hours and 55 minutes

Spacecraft properties
- Spacecraft: Progress MS-21 no.451
- Spacecraft type: Progress MS
- Manufacturer: Energia
- Launch mass: 7000 kg
- Payload mass: 2.5 tons

Start of mission
- Launch date: 26 October 2022, 00:20:09
- Rocket: Soyuz-2.1a
- Launch site: Baikonur, Site 31/6
- Contractor: RKTs Progress

End of mission
- Disposal: Deorbited
- Decay date: 19 February 2023, 03:15 UTC

Orbital parameters
- Reference system: Geocentric orbit
- Regime: Low Earth orbit
- Inclination: 51.65°

Docking with ISS
- Docking port: Poisk zenith
- Docking date: 28 October 2022, 02:49:03 UTC
- Undocking date: 18 February 2023, 02:26 UTC
- Time docked: 112 days and 23 hours

Payload
- Cargo and SCCS part of MLM Means of Attachment of Large payloads

Progress MS-21 (Russian: Прогресс МC-21), Russian production No.451, identified by NASA as Progress 82P, was a Progress spaceflight launched by Roscosmos to resupply the International Space Station (ISS). It was the 174th flight of a Progress spacecraft.

== History ==
The Progress-MS is an uncrewed freighter based on the Progress-M featuring improved avionics. This improved variant first launched on 21 December 2015. It has the following improvements:

- New external compartment that enables it to deploy satellites. Each compartment can hold up to four launch containers. First time installed on Progress MS-03.
- Enhanced redundancy thanks to the addition of a backup system of electrical motors for the docking and sealing mechanism.
- Improved Micrometeoroid (MMOD) protection with additional panels in the cargo compartment.
- Luch Russian relay satellites link capabilities enable telemetry and control even when not in direct view of ground radio stations.
- GNSS autonomous navigation enables real time determination of the status vector and orbital parameters dispensing with the need of ground station orbit determination.
- Real time relative navigation thanks to direct radio data exchange capabilities with the space station.
- New digital radio that enables enhanced TV camera view for the docking operations.
- Unified Command Telemetry System (UCTS) replaces previous Ukrainian Chezara Kvant-V as the Progress spacecraft's on-board radio and antenna/feeder system.
- Replacement of the Kurs A with Kurs NA digital system.

== Launch ==
On 3 February 2021, the State Commission for Testing of the Piloted Space Systems, chaired by Roskosmos head Dmitry Rogozin, approved the latest ISS schedule for 2021 and the first quarter of 2022.

A Soyuz-2.1a launched Progress MS-21 to the International Space Station from Baikonur Site 31 on 26 October 2022. Around 2 days after the launch, Progress MS-21 automatically docked with Poisk and continues its mission, supporting Expedition 68 aboard the ISS.

== Cargo ==
The MS-21 cargo capacity is 2,520 kg (5,560 lb) as follows:

- Dry cargo: 1,357 kg (2,992 lb)
- Fuel: 702 kg (1,548 lb)
- Nitrogen: 41 kg (90 lb)
- Water: 420 kg (930 lb)

=== Means of attachment of large payloads ===
It delivered SCCS part of MLM Means of Attachment of Large payloads (Sredstva Krepleniya Krupnogabaritnykh Obyektov, SKKO) work platform to ISS. Coupled with LCCS part of this MLM outfitting, delivered to ISS by Progress MS-18, during VKD-55 spacewalk, it was transferred over to Nauka and installed it at the ERA base point facing aft where ERA used to be, when it was launched, where it will be used to mount payloads on the exterior of Nauka module.

== Coolant pressure accident ==
On 11 February 2023, the freighter lost coolant pressure days before undocking from ISS, with no impact to the station as cargo had been unloaded and the spacecraft had been loaded with waste to be discarded. This incident was similar to the Soyuz MS-22 coolant loop accident in December 2022. It was undocked on 18 February 2023 as per previous schedule, after which burned in the Earth's atmosphere after deorbit.

== See also ==
- Uncrewed spaceflights to the International Space Station
