= Kosmos 2553 =

Russian military satellite

- Mission type: Military
- Operator: Russian Aerospace Forces
- COSPAR ID: 2022-011A
- SATCAT no.: 51511
- Mission duration: 3 years and 2 months

Spacecraft properties
- Spacecraft type: Neitron (14F1) No. 1
- Manufacturer: NPO Mashinostroyeniya

Start of mission
- Launch date: 5 February 2022, 07:00:00 UTC (10:00 MSK)
- Rocket: Soyuz-2.1a/Fregat
- Launch site: Plesetsk, Site 43/4
- Contractor: RKTs Progress

End of mission
- Disposal: Spacecraft failure
- Last contact: April 2025

Orbital parameters
- Perigee altitude: 1,999.8 km (1,242.6 mi)
- Apogee altitude: 2,006.8 km (1,247.0 mi)
- Inclination: 67.1°
- Period: 127.1 minutes

Kosmos 2553 (Russian: Космос 2553, lit. 'Cosmos 2553') is a Russian satellite launched on 5 February 2022, by the Russian Aerospace Forces. The satellite was delivered into orbit by a Soyuz-2.1a rocket with the assistance of a Fregat upper stage.

The satellite possibly ended its mission around April 2025, when ground observations indicated that it was tumbling in space, possibly caused by onboard spacecraft failure.

== Launch ==
The launch took place from Site 43/4 at the Plesetsk Cosmodrome on 5 February 2022 at 07:00 UTC (10:00 MSK, local time at the launch site). After the successful launch, the satellite was cataloged in the Main Catalogue of Space Objects by the Russian space surveillance system.

== Mission objectives ==
A February 2022 post by the Russian Armed Forces announcing the launch of Kosmos 2553 includes the following statement from the Ministry of Defense about the satellite’s mission: "Technological spacecraft […] equipped with newly developed onboard instruments and systems for testing them under the influence of radiation and heavy charged particles." As of May 2024, however, the NASA Space Science Data Coordinated Archive describes Kosmos 2553 as "a Russian military reconnaissance satellite designed by NPO Mashinostroyeniya, possibly a radar reconnaissance satellite".

=== Neitron radar system ===
Kosmos 2553 is reportedly part of Russia’s Neitron (Russian: Нейтрон, lit. 'Neutron') radar system, a new generation of radar satellites developed to enhance the country’s remote sensing capabilities. Built by NPO Mashinostroyeniya, the satellite is designed to improve situational awareness, early warning, and target tracking in challenging conditions. The Neitron system is expected to mark a significant advancement in Russia’s space-based radar technology, which has traditionally lagged behind that of other major powers.

== Controversy ==
Despite these official statements, there has been significant international concern and speculation regarding the true purpose of Kosmos 2553:

=== Anti-satellite weapon development ===
According to U.S. officials, Kosmos 2553 is linked to a Russian program aimed at developing a nuclear anti-satellite weapon (ASAT). The satellite is believed to serve as a research and development platform for non-nuclear components of this potential weapon system. This concern was further underscored by Rep. Mike Turner, Chairman of the House Intelligence Committee, who issued statements in February 2024 about a serious national security threat related to Russia's nuclear space ambitions. On 15 February 2024, the White House confirmed that U.S. intelligence had evidence that Russia is developing an ASAT weapon that "would be a violation of the Outer Space Treaty, to which more than 130 countries have signed up to, including Russia".

=== Strategic military applications ===
Reports indicate that if developed and deployed, the nuclear anti-satellite weapon associated with Kosmos 2553 could have the capability to destroy hundreds of satellites in low Earth orbit with a nuclear explosion. This would significantly disrupt satellite operations, particularly those used by the U.S. government and commercial entities like SpaceX's Starlink network. The Wall Street Journal article emphasized the potential strategic threat posed by such a weapon and detailed the satellite's unusual orbit and its role in testing non-nuclear components of the weapon system. These concerns have been further highlighted in recent statements by U.S. intelligence officials and congressional leaders.
