= Nauka (ISS module) =

Module of the International Space Station

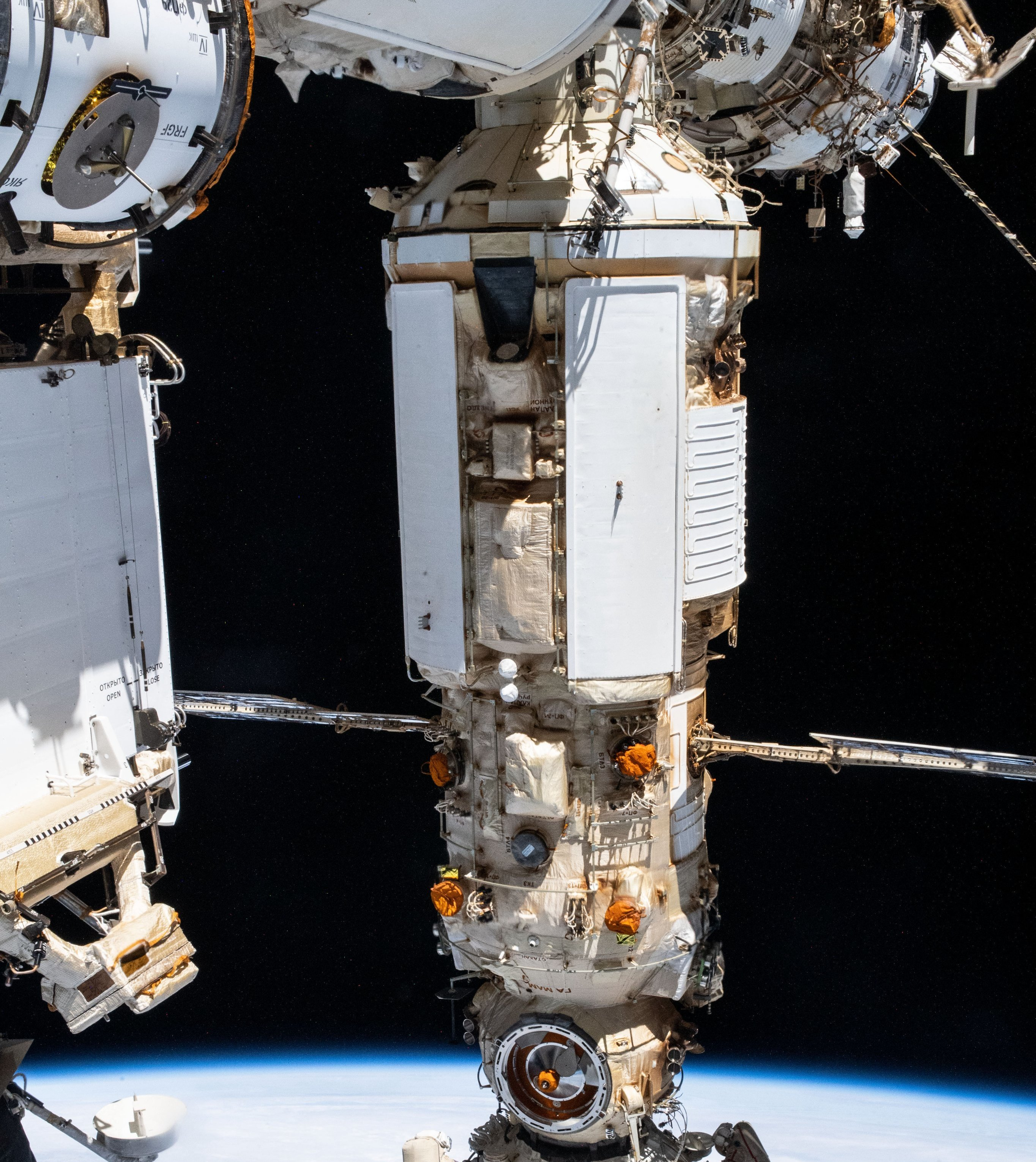
- Nauka as seen from the Cupola, during a Russian spacewalk in January 2022.

Module statistics
- COSPAR ID: 2021-066A
- Part of: International Space Station
- Launch date: 21 July 2021, 14:58:25 UTC
- Launch vehicle: Proton-M
- Docked: 29 July 2021, 13:29:01 UTC (Zvezda nadir)
- Mass: 20,357 kg (44,880 lb)
- Length: 13.12 m (43.0 ft)
- Width: 29.7 m (97 ft)
- Diameter: 4.25 m (13.9 ft)
- Pressurised volume: 80.9 m^{3} (2,860 cu ft); Habitable: 70 m^{3} (2,500 cu ft)

Configuration
- Diagram of Nauka's forward and aft exterior, with the European Robotic Arm in purple.

Nauka (Russian: Наука, lit. 'Science'), also known as the Multipurpose Laboratory Module, Upgrade (MLM-U, Russian: Многоцелевой лабораторный модуль, усоверше́нствованный), is the primary laboratory of the Russian Orbital Segment of the International Space Station (ISS). Serving alongside the Rassvet and Poisk mini-research modules, Nauka conducts scientific experiments and stores research equipment.

Originally built as a backup for Zarya, the very first module of the ISS, Nauka's construction was halted in the late 1990s, when it was about 70% complete. After exploring various options, Roscosmos decided to convert the partially completed module into a laboratory. While the initial target launch date was set for 2007, and outfitting equipment for Nauka was delivered by Space Shuttle Atlantis in 2010 attached to the Rassvet module, numerous delays and technical issues delayed the launch by 14 years.

Nauka finally launched on 21 July 2021 at 14:58:25 UTC from the Baikonur Cosmodrome atop a Proton-M rocket. Like most of the Russian modules, Nauka operated autonomously and after a flight lasting about eight days, Nauka docked to the nadir (Earth facing) port of the Zvezda module on 29 July 2021 at 13:29:01 UTC. However, after docking, a software glitch led the module's thrusters to keep firing, causing the entire space station to flip over one and a half times, before the module ran out of fuel. The crew was able to null the rotation, and return the station to its normal orientation. While the situation was tense and NASA declared a "spacecraft emergency", they later said that the situation did not endanger the lives of the ISS crew.

The addition of Nauka is the first major expansion of the Russian Orbital Segment in over 20 years. Cosmonauts would conduct twelve spacewalks over two years outfitting the module with equipment, much of it brought aboard the Rassvet module in 2010 and Prichal, a multi-port docking module was added to Nauka in November 2021.

== Description ==
Nauka is the primary laboratory of the Russian Orbital Segment, operating in conjunction with the Mini-Research Modules Rassvet and Poisk. It is used to conduct experiments and store scientific instruments, and can also serve as a backup service module for the ISS. Nauka is based on the Functional Cargo Block (FGB) design. It is 13.12 m (43.0 ft) long and 4.25 m (13.9 ft) wide, and is made of stainless steel, aluminium alloy, kevlar, and ceramic-wool insulation, totalling a mass of 20,350 kg (44,860 lb).

Nauka has two SSVP-M docking ports; the passive nadir port is used to attach Prichal to the station, while the active zenith port is used to attach Nauka itself to the station via Zvezda's nadir port. SSVP-M is a hybrid variant of the SSVP docking system that combines its traditional probe‑and‑drogue soft-capture mechanism with the APAS-95 hard-docking collar. While this is incompatible with Soyuz and Progress' standard SSVP-G ports, a temporary docking adapter SSVPA-GM that converts Nauka's nadir port from SSVP-M to SSVP-G was installed to allow them to dock. This adapter was removed upon the arrival of Prichal because, although it is the second module after Rassvet to use a port initially used by Soyuz or Progress spacecraft, it is not able to dock to SSVP-G ports like the Rassvet module. As a result, the Prichal module with its active hybrid docking port was only able to dock to the reconfigured port. With its docking, the number of docking ports on the ISS Russian Orbital Segment increased to eight. Another one was an Active AS-G forward port to allow the Airlock ShK module to berth with Nauka.

Full guidance and navigation control, enabled by an attitude control system using MDDK thrusters, provide roll control to the station using its advantageous position far from the station's fore-aft axis, which provides the greatest mechanical advantage for roll corrections of all the station's thruster-equipped modules. Nauka is also able to collect and store propellant delivered by Progress spacecraft and transfer it to Zvezda.

The European Space Agency's (ESA) European Robotic Arm located on Nauka's exterior enables the installation, removal or replacement of external experiment payloads; the transfer of payloads through the science airlock; and visual inspections of the station. It can support spacewalks by providing foot restraints, tether points, and control panels both on the inside and outside of the station. Nauka contains life support equipment including an oxygen production system capable of supporting six crew, a galley, a toilet with a urine recycling system, and one of the three sleep stations aboard the Russian Orbital Segment. There is a large observation window similar to Destiny's nadir window for the crew on the aft side of the docking sphere, towards the nadir port, while one 9-inch-wide window hatch is on the forward port for the airlock module, similar to the two windows on the Kibo Pressurized Module.

=== Science (or Experiment) Airlock ShK ===
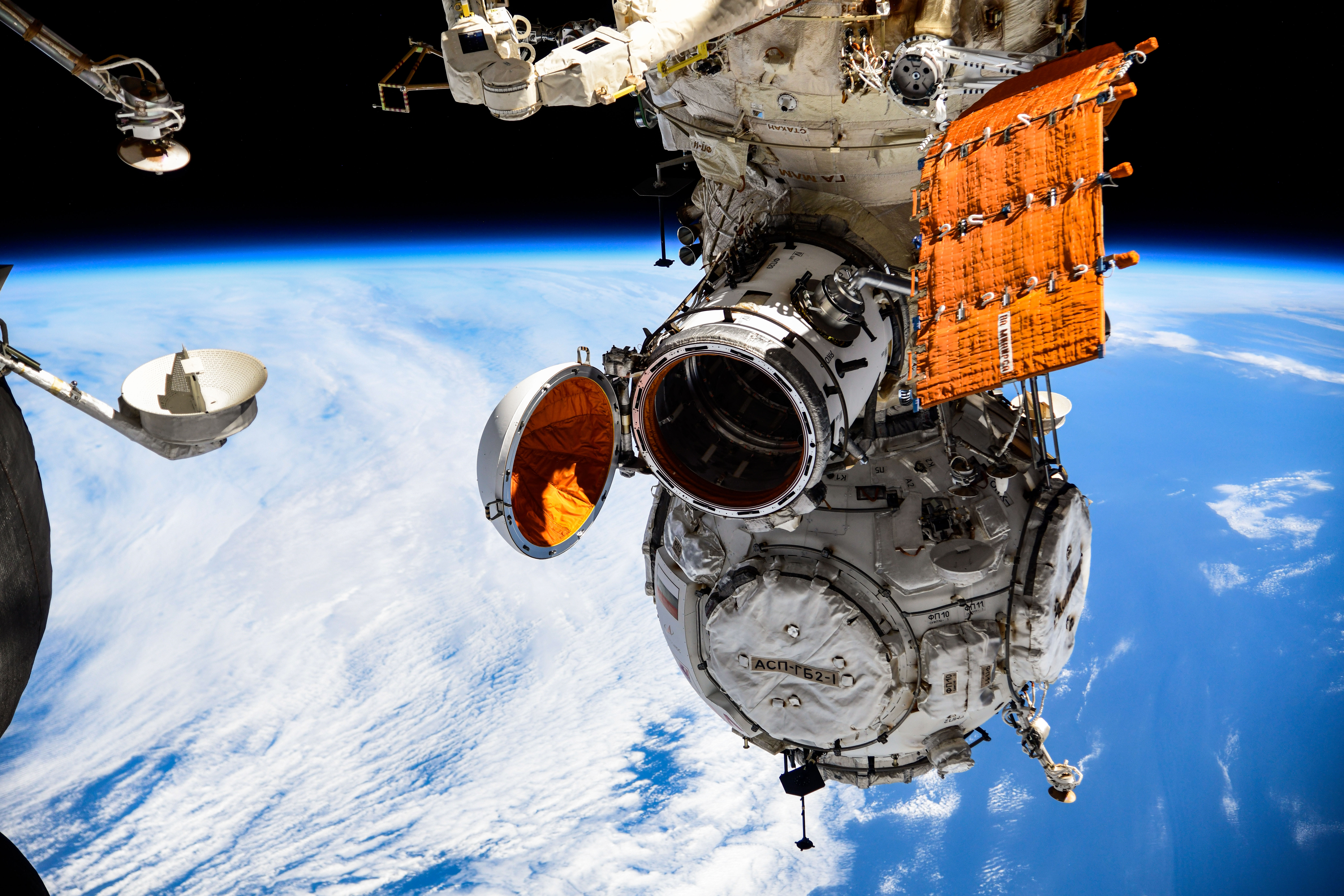
Experiment Airlock berthed to Nauka, while egressing payloads onto the outside of the station

The airlock, Shk, is designed for a payload with dimensions up to 1,200 mm × 500 mm × 500 mm (47 in × 20 in × 20 in), has a volume of 2.1 m^{3}, weight of 1050 kg and consumes 1.5 kW of power at the peak. Prior to berthing the MLM to the ISS, the airlock was stowed as part of MRM1. On 4 May 2023, 01:00 UTC, the chamber was moved by the ERA manipulator and berthed to the forward active docking port of the pressurized docking hub of the Nauka module. It is intended to be used:

- for extracting payloads from the MLM docking adapter and placing them on the outer surface of the station;
- enable science investigations to be removed, exposed to the external space environment, then returned inside while being maneuvered with the European robotic arm.
- for receiving payloads from the ERA manipulator and moving them into the internal volume of the airlock and further into the MLM pressurized adapter;
- for conducting scientific experiments in the internal volume of the airlock;
- for conducting scientific experiments outside the lock chamber on an extended table and in a special organized place.
- for launching cubesats into space, with the aid of ERA – very similar to the Japanese airlock and Nanoracks Bishop Airlock on the U.S. segment of the station.

== Development ==
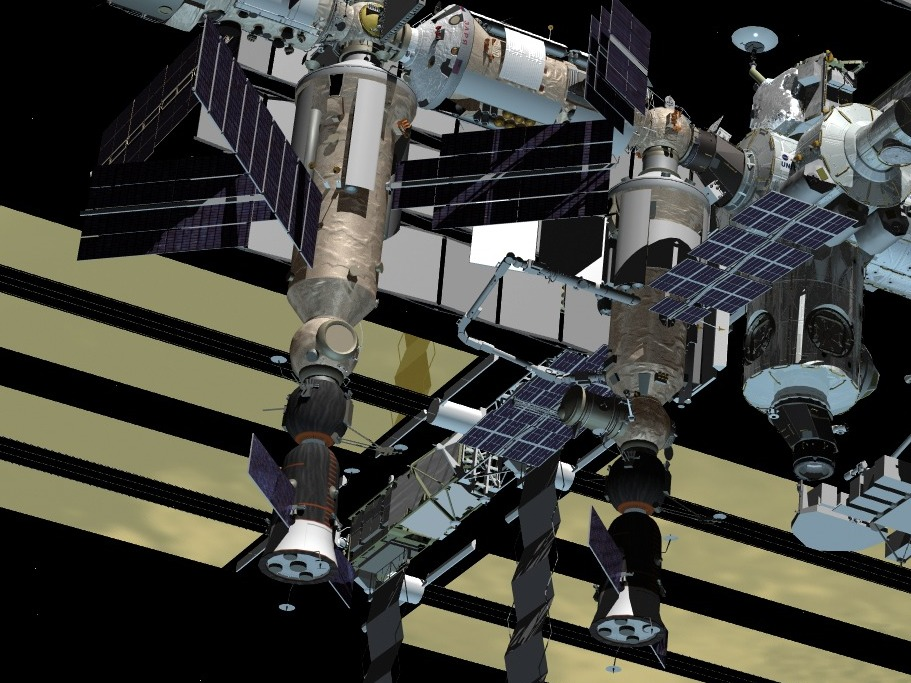
A Russian Research Module docked to Zvezda (left) and MLM docked to Zarya (right) in an early 2000s concept.

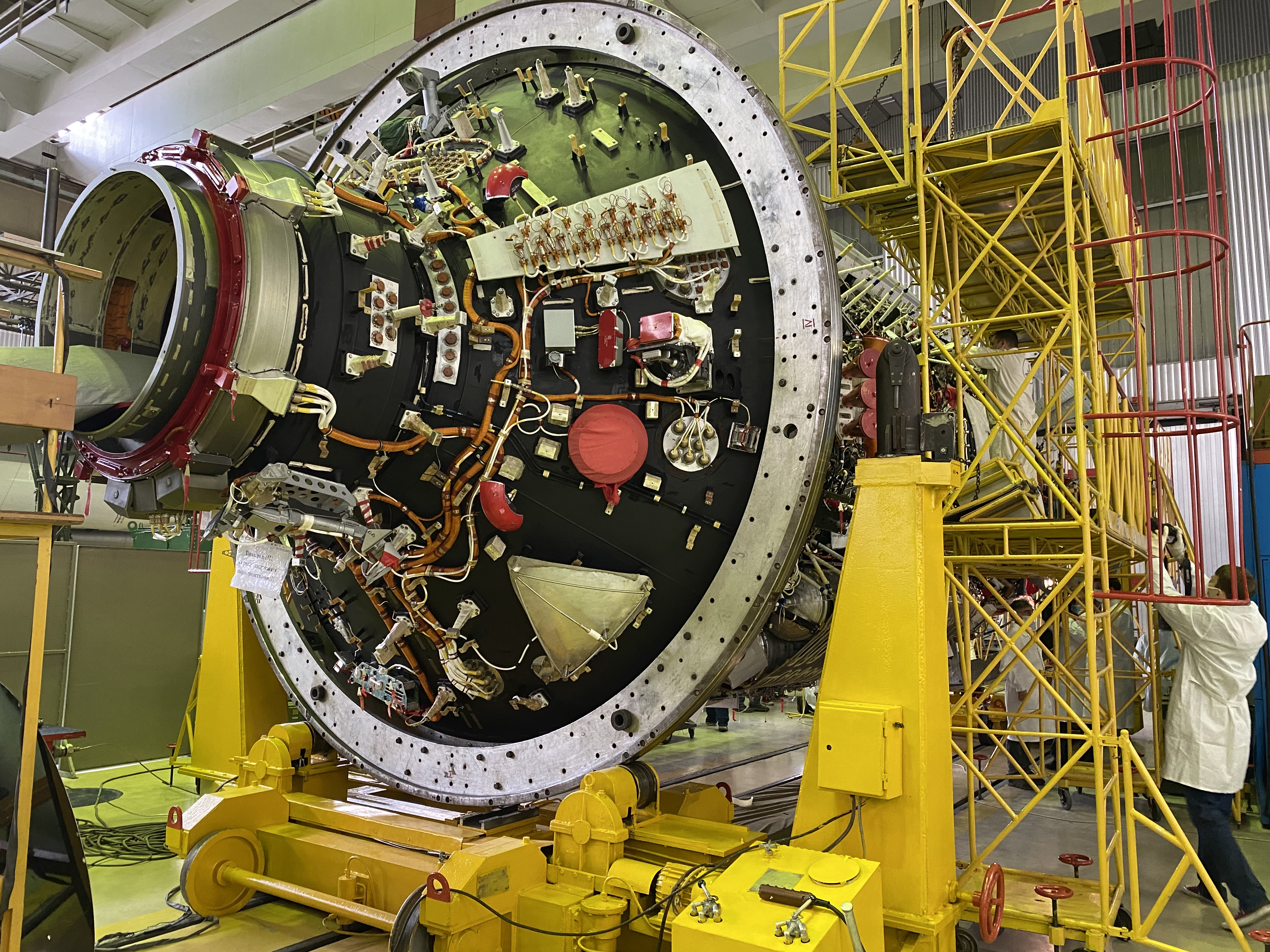
Nauka undergoing tests at Khrunichev in July 2020, a month before it was shipped to Baikonur.

In the 1990s, Roscosmos' original plan for the Russian Orbital Segment included two Russian Research Modules and a Universal Docking Module based on the FGB design to be located at Zvezda's nadir port. A backup flight article for FGB-based Zarya, known in production as FGB-2, was originally planned to serve as the Universal Docking Module, though its construction had been halted at 70% completion in the late 1990s. By August 2004, Roscosmos decided to scrap the two research modules in favour of flying FGB-2 as a single research module known as Nauka. A joint Astrotech-Energia concept for a Commercial Enterprise Module-based Nauka, proposed to Roscosmos around this time, was rejected. In 2005, Roscosmos brokered a deal with the ESA to launch their European Robotic Arm with Nauka, with its spare elbow joint to launch with Rassvet.

While Roscosmos had originally hoped Nauka would be ready for launch by 2007, multiple delays pushed the prospective launch date back progressively to 2014. Acceptance tests of Nauka in late 2013 found leaks in the propulsion system's fueling valve and contamination, so Energia returned the module to Khrunichev for twelve to eighteen months of repairs. Nauka's prospective 2015 launch was delayed again after more fuel valve leaks damaged the module's exterior plumbing, necessitating its replacement. Metallic dust contamination in the module's fuel tanks in 2017 caused three more years of delays, as initial repairs were unsuccessful, and the installation of a new single-use fuel system based on the Fregat upper stage was considered as a solution. However, in late 2019, the original tanks were successfully repaired, rendering the planned Fregat-based tanks redundant and paving the way for a 2019 or 2020 launch.

Targeting an early-to-mid-2020 launch, Nauka's Proton-M launch vehicle was assembled and shipped to the Baikonur Cosmodrome in February. However, Nauka needed another fuel tank valve replacement, along with further tests necessitated by an expiring warranty following years of delays. The testing – which could only take place at Energia in Russia instead of Kazakhstan, where Baikonur is located – was completed in May 2020, around the same time the new fuel tank valves were shipped to Baikonur. Efforts to launch Nauka were affected by the outbreak of COVID-19 in Europe in early 2020, which led to suspension of all work in March, April, and July, and a sizeable reduction in workforce throughout the year, as part of measures to prevent the potential spread of the disease. Nauka finally arrived in Baikonur in August 2020, along with its solar panels and the European Robotic Arm shortly afterwards. The loading of cargo and supplies onto Nauka began on 11 September 2020, while its MMOD armor and batteries were installed. Throughout October and November 2020, Expedition 65 cosmonauts Pyotr Dubrov and Oleg Novitsky, who were to be responsible for Nauka's installation to the station in orbit via numerous extravehicular activities, conducted two Crew Equipment Interface Tests during which the module was powered on for the first time with various components deployed, and the cosmonauts inspected and toured the vehicle's exterior.

By November 2020, Nauka had been put through 306 of the 754 tests needed before it could be processed for launch, and by January 2021 80% of the tests were complete. Throughout January and February, Nauka's tanks, thrusters, and automated docking system underwent final testing, along with the European Robotic Arm. In March, two more Crew Equipment Interface Tests with Dubrov and Novitsky took place, and Nauka's launch was delayed one final time from May to July 2021, following further COVID-19-related restrictions and complications with traffic on the International Space Station. In May, Nauka passed Roscosmos' flight readiness review, underwent a final round of pressurization and leak tests, and the SSVP docking adapter, the solar panels, and the European Robotic Arm were attached to the module's exterior. One final Crew Equipment Interface Test was conducted with cosmonaut Aleksandr Skvortsov and his backup Sergey Prokopyev before Nauka's encapsulation in the Proton-M's payload fairing in June. On 28 June, Nauka was successfully mated with its Proton-M launch vehicle and rolled out to Site 200 on 17 July.

== Launch ==
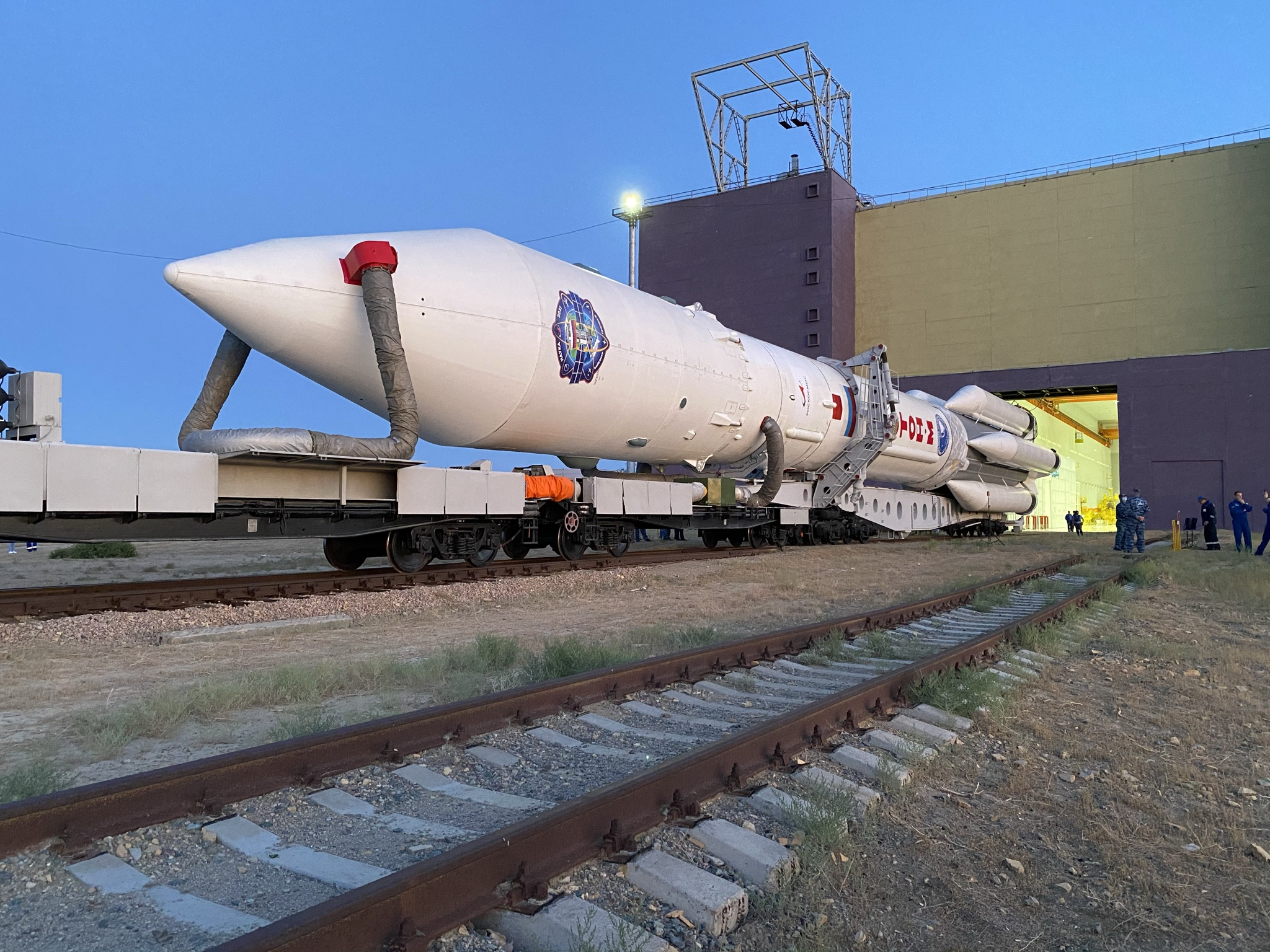
The rollout of the Proton-M rocket with Nauka

On 2 May 2021, the launch schedule was posted online; it involved the launch of Progress MS-17 on 30 June to deliver outfitting hardware to the station and plugs to fix the leak in the Zvezda service module. Before it docked, Novitsky and Dubrov performed a spacewalk to remove equipment and cables from Pirs in preparation for undocking. Site 200, from which Nauka and its Proton-M were to launch, were modified to supply chilled air and fuel the vehicle as it sat on the pad; the same modifications were made to Site 81 when Mir, Zarya, and Zvezda were launched from it. On 7 June, work at Site 200 was completed in preparation for the assembly of the launch vehicle and the rollout of Nauka to Pad 39 at the facility.

On 30 June 2021, fueling began, but a problem with the spacecraft's guidance sensors was detected and Nauka was rolled back to the instrumentation and test facility at Site 254. The upper fairing was removed and rolled away while workers using safety harnesses changed and replaced the sensors and reinstalled the MLI. On 1 July, more imperfections were found requiring a full scrub down and systems had to be removed and replaced. On 3 July, the fairing was reattached and Nauka was powered on to test the sensors before it was reloaded onto the transfer car and redelivered to the airlock where it was placed on a flatcar for delivery to Site 31 for fueling.

On 9 July 2021, ILS completed stacking of the Proton rocket at Site 200 and all three of the lower stages were fueled and standing by for the arrival of Nauka. Because of delays with rewrapping the sensors, rollout was scheduled for 17 July with launch on the 21st. Also on 9 July, teams from ILS, Khrunichev, Roscosmos, Energia, and Yuzhny Space Center conducted a dry countdown to test the new computers and systems at Site 200 which would control Nauka and feed it and the Proton rocket telemetry through the first 12 minutes of flight up until first stage separation and fairing jettison, where telemetry would be controlled from ground stations and from Mission Control Moscow. On 10 July, Nauka was fueled and the aft compartment was closed out in preparation for the transfer to Site 200 to be attached to the Proton rocket. Launch was scheduled for 21 July at 14:58 UTC.

On 13 July 2021, Novitsky and Dubrov carried out work on the Pirs module, splitting up the hydraulic circuit and module control communications via the Progress spacecraft, and checked the docking unit and its systems. In this process they closed the Pirs module hatch that was connected to the Zvezda service module, after which Pirs was ultimately undocked on 23 July. Also on 13 July, Roscosmos revealed the mission patch for Nauka which was in the process of being painted on the fairing and on the Proton launch vehicle itself. A smaller mission patch was flown inside, attached to the wall with Velcro. On 14 July, Roscosmos revealed the website for Nauka and began the countdown for launch. A spacewalk was to be performed on 8 September by Novitsky and Dubrov to remove thermal shrouds for the ERA and the hardware launched on Rassvet including Nauka's docking ball and the transfer compartment. This would free up ports for the Science airlock and the RTOd radiator and will allow the ERA to retrieve its boom which was stowed on the Rassvet module. When Nauka arrived, the ERA's first task after the Russian spacewalk was to grapple the airlock and the radiator and install them, with Novitsky and Dubrov bolting them down and routing cables and piping in preparation for their deployment at the end of the spacewalk. On the same day, the Proton-M rocket received Nauka at Site 92. Rollout was slated for 17 July.

In the early morning hours of 17 July 2021, Nauka was loaded onto a rail transporter erector and was rolled out to Pad 39 at Site 200. Over the next few days Nauka was checked out before its launch on 21 July at 14:58 UTC. On 19 July, a launch dress rehearsal was conducted to test the systems. With 48 hours remaining in the launch window everything remained go for an on-time liftoff. On the station, Pirs was loaded with garbage and the hatch was closed and locked for the last time in preparation for undocking. On 20 July, Nauka had its final launch dress rehearsal, During which it was powered on and the Proton flight computer was activated to test the ground launch sequencer. While this was going on, technicians from Roscosmos and ILS connected the umbilical cables and fueling and vent lines to the rocket. After the Launch Readiness Review (LRR) in which Rogozin sat down with senior staff to conduct the go/no-go poll, the Proton was fueled and the countdown proceeded to launch. Nauka successfully lifted off from the pad on 21 July at 14:58:25 UTC.

== Transit phase and docking ==
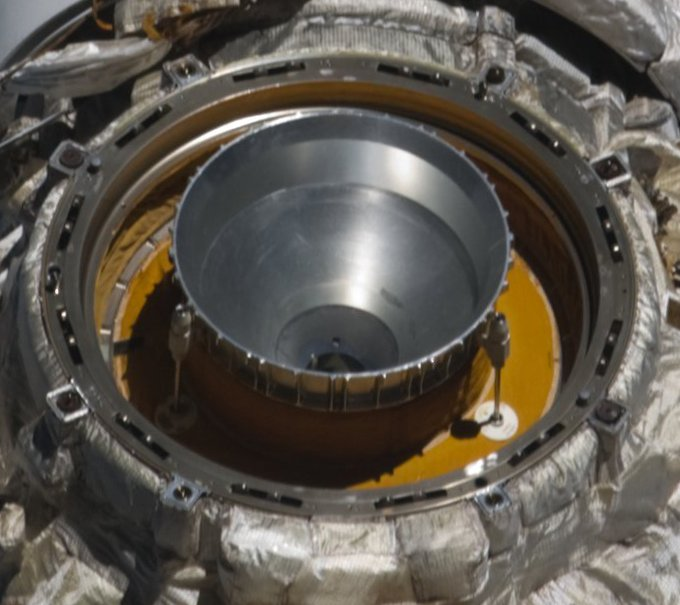
Zvezda nadir port, the docking location of Nauka

Several problems occurred after the launch, including loss of telemetry and issues with the main propulsion system. On 22 July 2021, the Nauka Multipurpose Module Flight Control Group specialists at Mission Control Moscow conducted two correction maneuvers. The first maneuver took place at 15:07 UTC with the module engines' burn for 17.23 seconds giving an impulse of 1 m/s. The second burn for 250.04 seconds took place at 17:19 UTC with an impulse of 14.59 m/s. By then, the telemetry confirmed the propulsion system's operability.

Additional burns for further orbit correction were scheduled for 23 July 2021. On 23 July, Nauka conducted the third and fourth burn in its approach. Because of the burn duration and Nauka's location in orbit two more burns seemed needed to get it back into plane. Because of this the undocking of Pirs was pushed back by 12 hours with the new undocking time scheduled for 25 July.

By mid-day 24 July 2021, the issues with Nauka propulsion had further postponed the schedule for undocking Pirs by another day, to 26 July. On 26 July at 10:55 UTC, Pirs undocked from the ISS for the last time. Roscosmos sent the deorbit command and Pirs entered the atmosphere over the Pacific Ocean at 14:01 UTC in a 17-minute burn. Self-destruct came at 15:04 UTC and Pirs and the trash that was inside it burned up as it entered the atmosphere over the Pacific, the first ISS module to be decommissioned and destroyed.

Hours after undocking, Canadarm2 grappled Zarya and performed an inspection of Zvezda. No debris was detected and the latches were safely retracted. No additional spacewalk was needed and the space station was ready to receive Nauka on 29 July 2021.

On 27 July 2021, specialists of the Nauka flight control group at the Mission Control Center carried out a routine corrective maneuver for the module. The final orbit correction to put Nauka on a rendezvous path with ISS was performed on 28 July at 16:43:07 UTC with a single firing of the main engines.

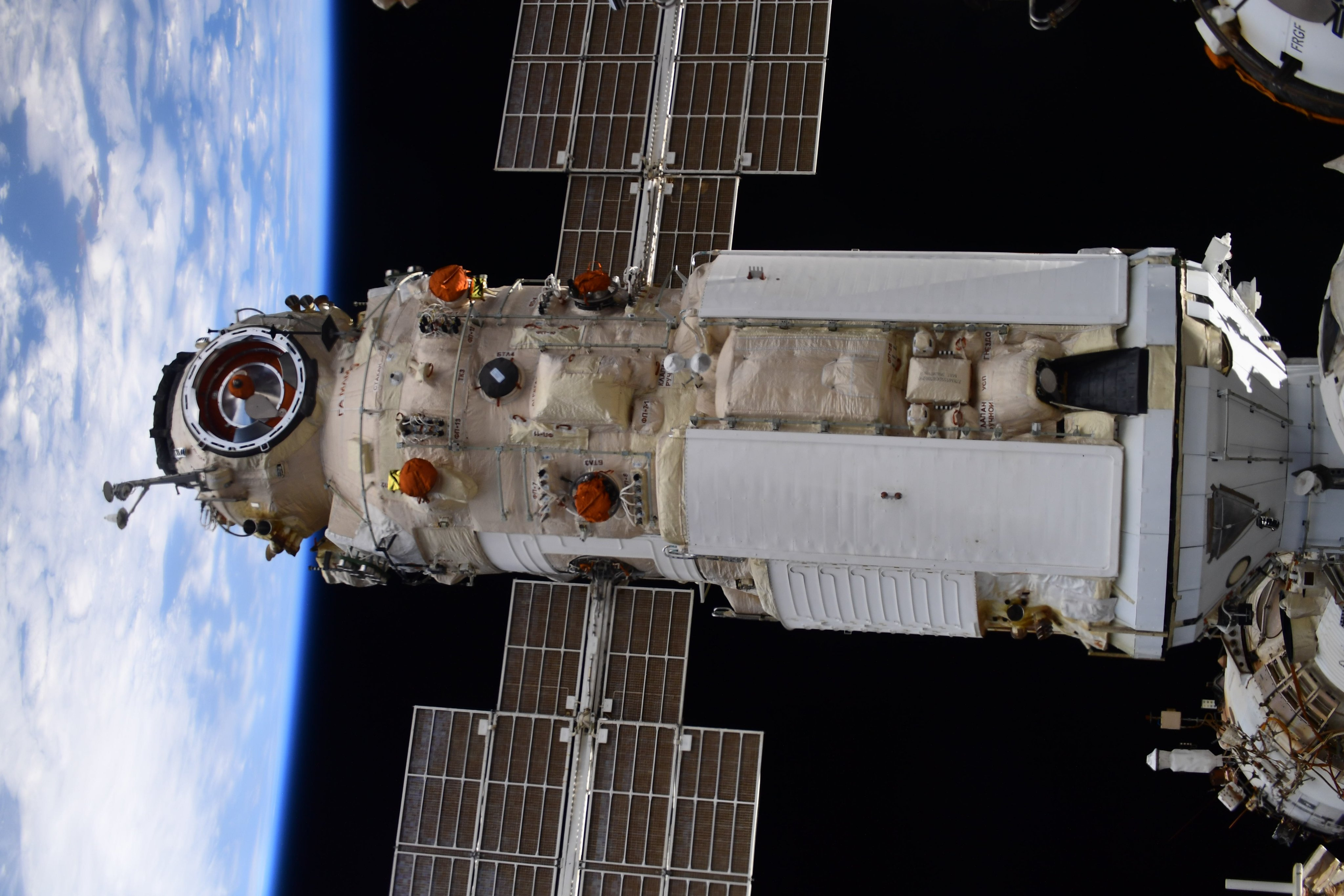
Nauka docked to ISS

On 29 July 2021, Nauka successfully automatically docked and was attached to the station at 13:29 UTC, and was put to work on the station by the crew.

== Post-docking activities ==
=== Thruster glitches after docking ===
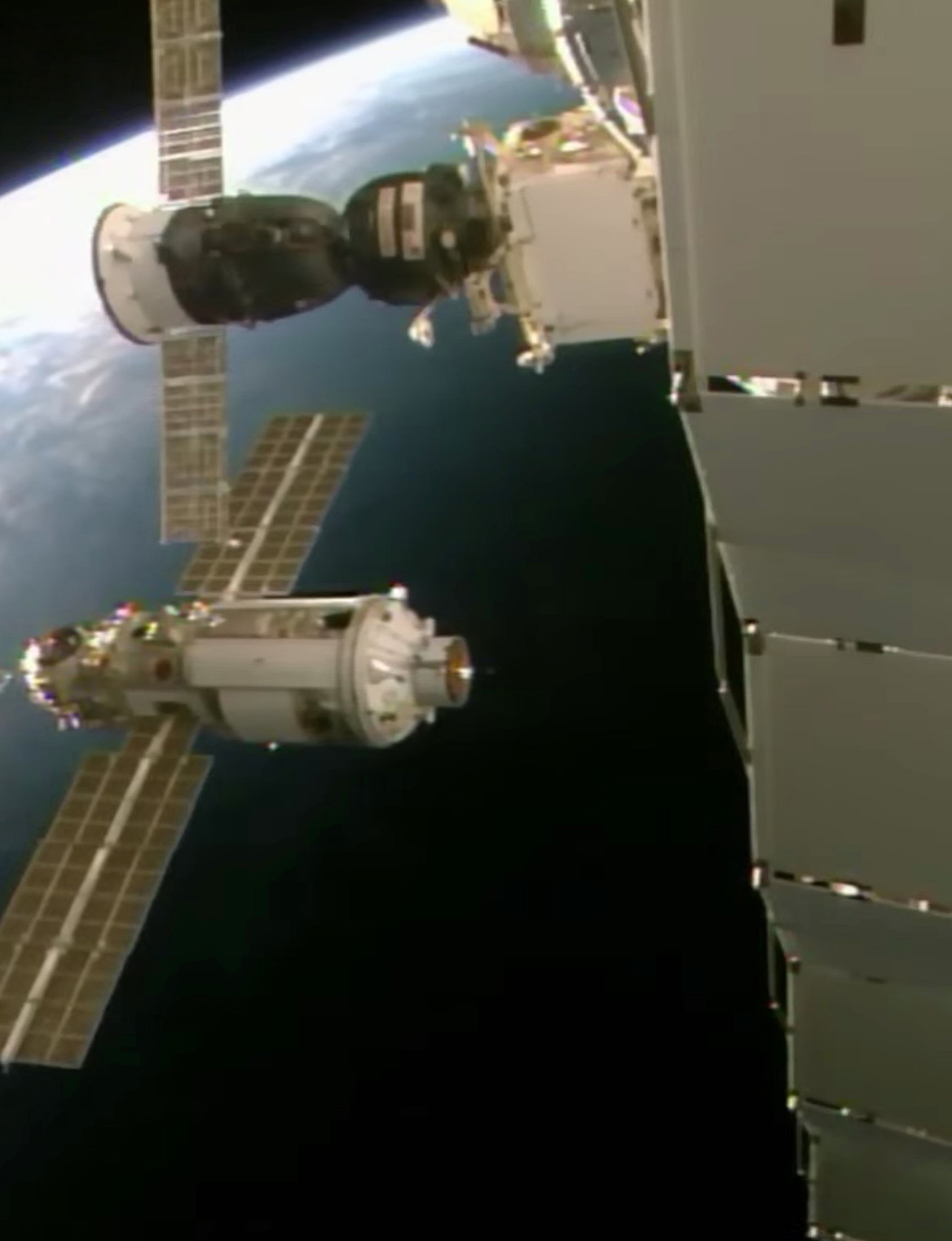
Nauka approaching its docking port

A few hours after docking while the crew were performing leak checks in preparation for hatch opening, Nauka's onboard computers experienced a software glitch, due to which an erroneous direct command fired onboard thrusters, causing the ISS to rotate out of orientation unexpectedly. NASA and Roscosmos ground controllers worked to remotely fix the glitch issue, while at the same time instructing the crew to close all window shutters and stand-by for computer reboot. Controllers initially attempted to counteract the inadvertent thrust through the use of thrusters on the Zvezda service module, a job later transferred to the Progress MS-17 vehicle. The station made one and a half complete rotations over the next 44 minutes, after which Nauka burned through its remaining fuel and Mission Control Moscow disabled the engines. Nauka's control system was transferred from flight mode to "docked with the ISS" mode, and thrust control was returned to Progress MS-17 and Zvezda, allowing attitude control of the station to be regained. Because of the glitch, all activities were temporarily scrubbed and the launch of Boeing Orbital Flight Test 2 was delayed 96 hours while the crew continued checkouts of Nauka. On 3 August 2021, it was decided to use Zvezda's engines to correct the station's orbit parameters for the relocation of Soyuz MS-18 and the launch of Soyuz MS-19. The burn was originally planned for 19 August, but was instead executed on 21 August and lasted for 50 seconds.

Because of the incident, Mission Control Moscow ordered Zvezda to be evacuated while commands were sent to purge the fuel lines with helium and to make sure there were no leaks of the toxic hypergolic fuel on the Russian Segment.

=== Commission ===
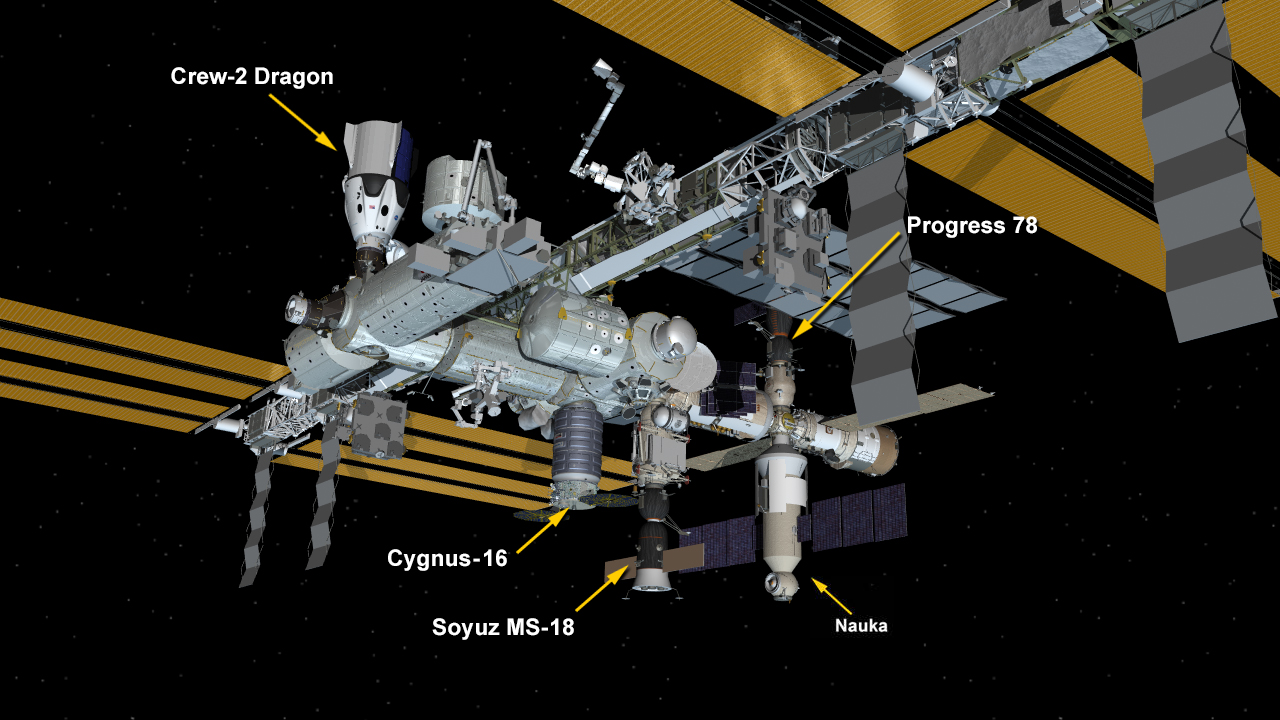
Vehicles visiting the ISS at the time of Nauka's docking.

The international partners formed a commission chaired by Bill Nelson of NASA. Members of this panel included prime contractor Boeing, JAXA and their prime contractor Mitsubishi Heavy Industries, ESA and their prime contractors Thales Alenia Space and Dutch Space, Roscosmos, and contractors from Energia. On 30 July the commission delivered their final report and the chief engineer identified the root cause of the glitch to be a direct command sent to Nauka from the ground before the Kurs and TORU systems were deactivated, leading to the thruster firings.

=== Integrating into the ISS ===
Nauka docking sequence to the International Space Station's docking port

Work resumed on 30 July 2021 to outfit Nauka and tie its computers into the ISS. Novitsky and Dubrov performed leak checks before they started opening hatches between the modules. Once the hatch was opened, cables were connected and laptops were set up and connected to the station's routers. Then the cosmonauts connected the plumbing and the waste and fuel lines to the station, and disabled Nauka's engines to prevent them from firing until they were connected to the station's computers. They also set up sleeping quarters for the crew that were to arrive shortly, activated experiments and turned on environmental control to cool Nauka until the RTOd radiator was extracted from Rassvet in October. At 17:47 UTC, the hatches were opened and Novitsky and Dubrov entered Nauka and made their way into the workshop. They first installed ventilation lines from the U.S. and Russian segments to vent out any stale air remaining from the launch. Next, they activated alarms and smoke detectors and installed gas monitors to check for traces of UDMH and N_{2}O_{4} following venting the day before. They finished the day by removing unneeded hardware and launch restraints and transferring them to Progress MS-17 for disposal.

On 2 August 2021, Novitsky and Dubrov dismantled some hardware that came up in Nauka and disposed of unneeded trash. They also started installing racks and assembling the station's toilet, and assembled the environmental control systems. They finished the day by cleaning their spacesuits and doing maintenance on the suits' environmental systems in preparation for an upcoming spacewalk. Over the next few days, they unloaded all the cargo and emptied the corridor so the cosmonauts could gain access to the nadir end.

On 9 and 12 September 2021, two spacewalks were performed by Novitsky and Dubrov to wire up Nauka. The cosmonauts also installed handrails and attachment points for experiments. Work was done inside to install the Robotic Work Station which controls ERA. On 28 September 2021, Soyuz MS-18 was moved around the block to Nauka for the first docking of these two spacecraft. This cleared Rassvet for the arrival of Soyuz MS-19 on 5 October 2021.

On 15 October 2021, at 09:02 UTC, during preparation of the ship's propulsion system for landing, the Soyuz MS-18 inadvertently fired its thrusters beyond its planned time, changing the orientation of the ISS by as much as 57°, at 09:13 UTC. The station's attitude control system counteracted that motion by activating thrusters of the Russian Segment. The erroneous firing of Soyuz engines was the result of a procedural error in the instructions sent by mission control to Novitsky ahead of the test. Fortunately, the flight control system aboard the Soyuz spacecraft had a limit set for the engine testing, which generated a cutoff command as soon as the firing consumed all the propellant allocated for the test. As a result, all the propellant reserves aboard the spacecraft needed for landing remained untouched. The crew was not in danger and it was the second such incident since the loss of control of the Nauka on 29 July.

On 17 October 2021, Soyuz MS-18 undocked from Nauka, returning Novitsky and two space tourists, actress Yulia Peresild and her producer director Klim Shipenko, to Earth, after spending a week on the station filming the movie The Challenge.

On 20 October 2021, Progress MS-17 undocked from Poisk and was placed in chase mode for 24 hours.The Progress MS-17 was the cargo freighter that assisted the crew in many of operations related to Nauka, including providing equipment for integrating Nauka. It redocked to Nauka on 22 October. After the redocking Dubrov and Anton Shkaplerov installed a docking adapter and reopened the hatches to finish loading it with trash from inside Nauka, in preparation for its undocking on 24 November.

=== Integrating with Prichal ===
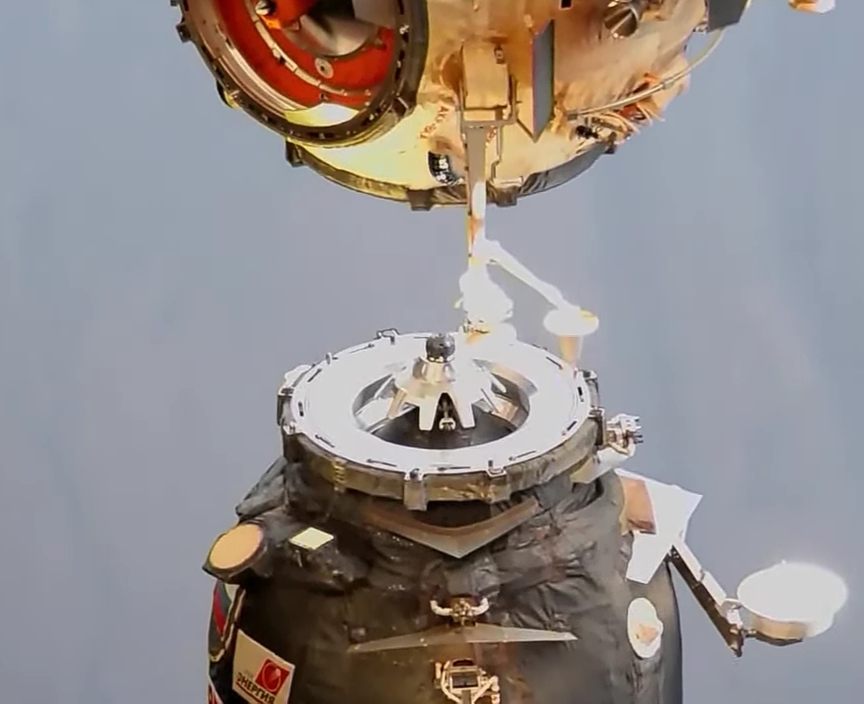
Progress MS-17 undocking and Nauka nadir temporary docking adapter removal from ISS (Note: The temporary docking adapter is the grey ring surrounding the docking probe of Progress MS-17.)

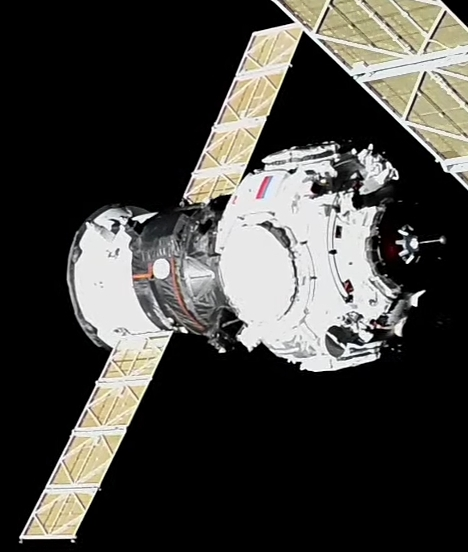
Prichal arrival

Roscosmos launched the Prichal Node Module in November 2021. Prichal increased the number of available docking ports on the Russian Orbital Segment by four. As Nauka was designed to be permanently docked to Prichal, its nadir docking port is of the SSVP-M or "Hybrid" standard, which consists of the traditional SSVP-G probe‑and‑drogue soft-dock mechanism and an APAS-95 hard-dock collar. This would make the docking port unusable for Soyuz or Progress flights in case Prichal failed to arrive at the station, because these spacecraft use a slightly different SSVP standard. To ensure the availability of four ports on the segment, Nauka was launched with an APAS to SSVP-G adapter ring.

On 25 November 2021, Progress MS-17 undocked from Nauka, taking with it the adapter ring, since Prichal can dock only to a SSVP-M port, not SSVP-G. It was later deorbited together with Progress MS-17 and both burned up on reentry over the South Pacific Ocean. After this, the final visiting spacecraft, Progress M-UM, a modified Progress spacecraft consisting of the usual fuel compartment and propulsion module and Prichal in place of the forward pressurized module, docked to the now exposed SSVP-M port. On 22 December 2021, the Progress undocked from Prichal, freeing the nadir port for docking. A spacewalk on 19 January 2022, connected power and telemetry cables and fluid quick disconnects were mated so Progress and Soyuz ships can transfer fuel to Nauka's main tanks.

As of December 2025, Nauka is expected to outlive the ISS as part of the planned Russian Orbital Station. Under this plan, Prichal will be separated from Nauka and replaced by the near-identical Universal Node Module in 2028.

== Outfitting work ==
Twelve spacewalks were required to fully outfit alongside commissioning Nauka and ERA; the first of these was performed in September 2021, ending in August 2023.

=== Installation of outfitting equipment ===
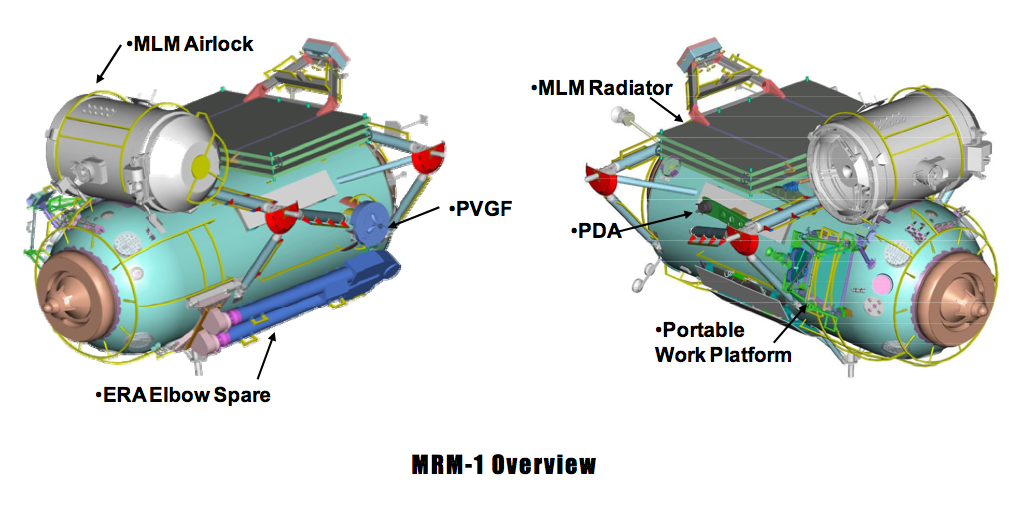
MLM outfittings on Rassvet

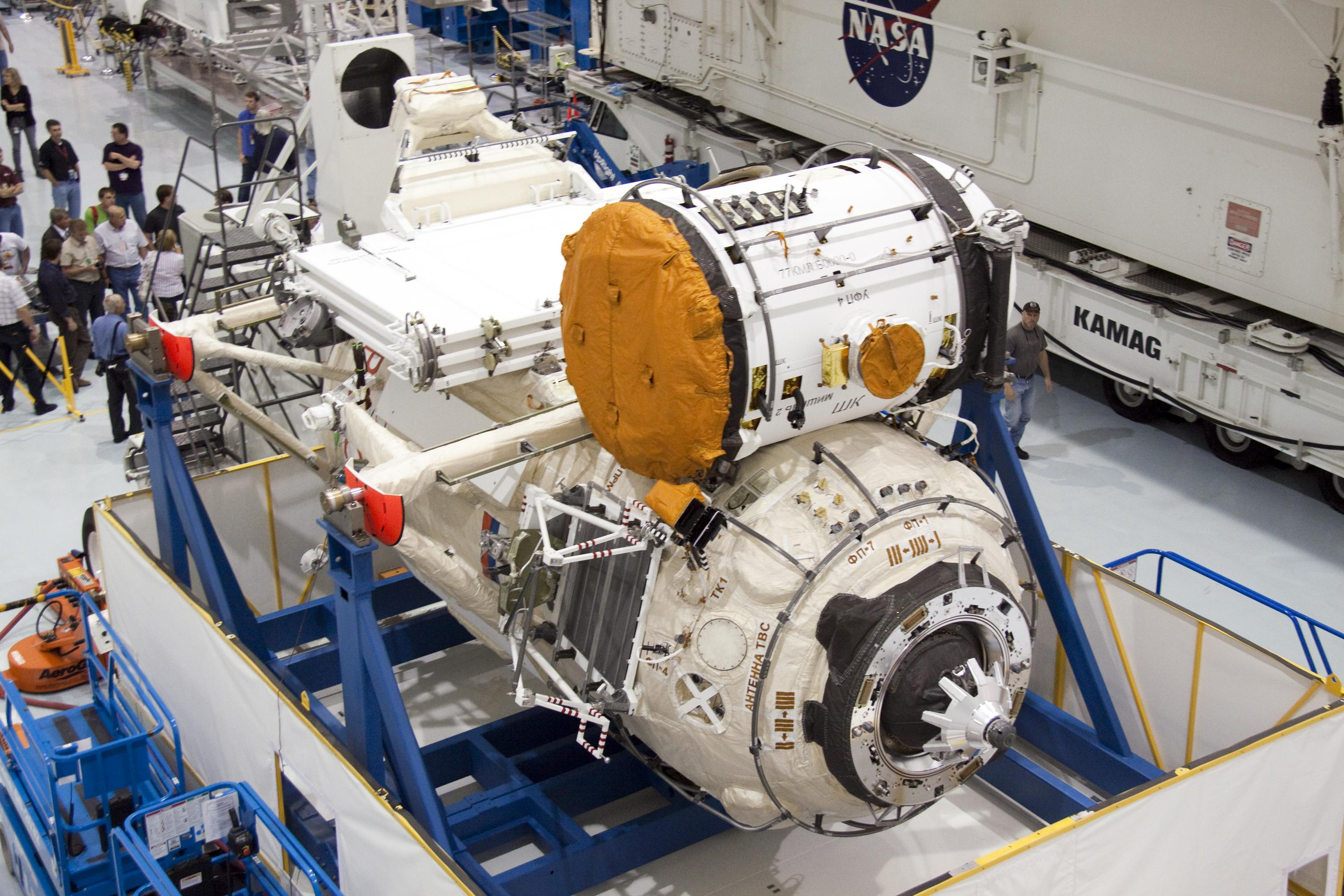
MLM outfitting equipment consisting of the MLM Experiment Airlock, MLM radiators and ERA workpost on the Rassvet module as seen at KSC.

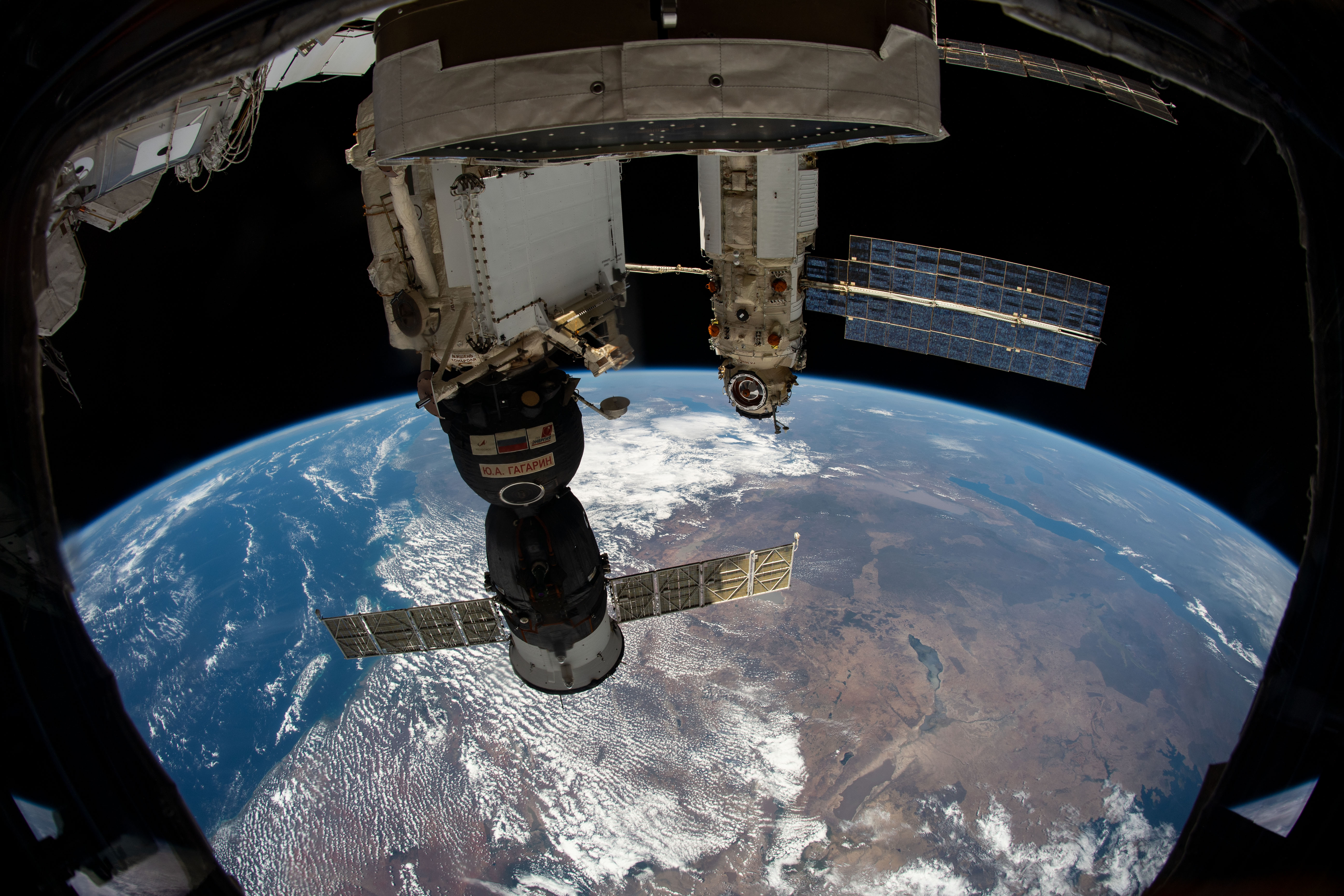
A wide-angle view of Nauka (behind Rassvet) attached to the ROS as seen from the Cupola.

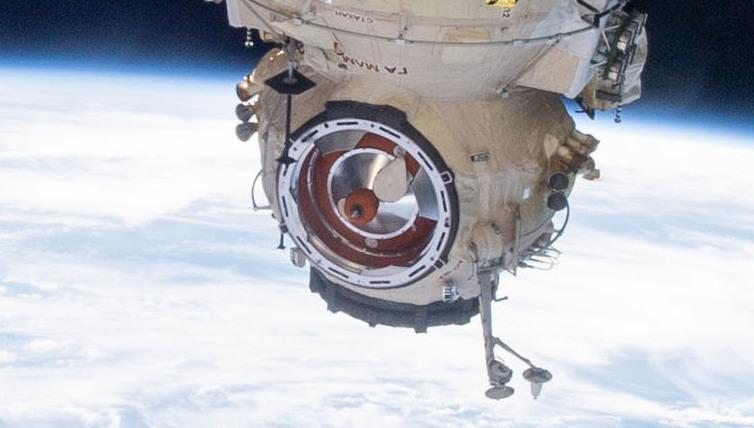
Nauka modified ASA-G forward port for experimental airlock after docking to the International Space Station

In May 2010, outfitting equipment for Nauka was launched, attached to the outside of Rassvet (Mini-Research Module 1) on STS-132 (as part of an agreement with NASA) and delivered by Space Shuttle Atlantis. The equipment, weighing 1.4 metric tons, includes a spare elbow joint for ERA (launched with Nauka) and an ERA portable workpost used during EVAs, the RTOd heat radiator, internal hardware and an experiment airlock for launching CubeSats, to be positioned on the modified passive forward port near the nadir end of the module.

Out of these, the outfitting equipment needed for ERA was to be first deployed. After that, the radiator and airlock was outfitted to Nauka. The spacewalkers changed a grapple fixture so the airlock can be used as a base point for the arm, broke torque on bolts that secure the airlock and radiator to Rassvet, removed launch restraints from the radiator, and vented nitrogen jumpers on VKD-55 spacewalk on 17 November 2022. The airlock has a NASA-made FRGF grapple fixture, which was attached to the airlock component carried aboard Rassvet, and used to attach it to the shuttle's Canadarm for passing it over to the station's Canadarm2. The grapple fixture is designed to operate until 2028. The cosmonauts modified this grapple fixture to allow ERA to transfer the airlock from its storage location on Rassvet to the operational position on Nauka's forward port and for airlock's use all over the station.

The deployable radiator adds additional cooling capability to Nauka, enabling it to host more scientific experiments. The airlock is used only to pass experiments inside and outside Nauka with the aid of ERA — serving a very similar purpose to the Japanese airlock on Kibo and Nanoracks Bishop Airlock, both on the U.S. segment of the station.

The ERA was used to remove the RTOd radiator on VKD-56 spacewalk and experiment airlock Shk on VKD-57 spacewalk from Rassvet and transfer them over to Nauka. This process took several months.

Another MLM outfitting is a 4 segment external payload interface called means of attachment of large payloads (Sredstva Krepleniya Krupnogabaritnykh Obyektov, SKKO). It was delivered in two parts to Nauka by Progress MS-18 (delivered LCCS part, that is, the four part SKKO frame) and Progress MS-21 (delivered SCCS part, that is, the payload adapter plates) spacecraft as a part of module activation outfitting process. Once the nadir end of SKKO was soft docked to Nauka and bolted down, the launch locks on SKKO were released by the spacewalkers to allow it to be unfolded and extended with its joints self locking in the extended position to create a rigid frame. Then the Zenith end of SKKO was soft docked to Nauka and bolted down. The 3 passive payload adapters and the one active payload adapter (i.e. active remote sensing payload like MIR Priroda's Travers Synthetic Aperture Radar) are then outfitted. The SKKO is derived from the setup used on the Priroda module. SKKO elements were launched inside the Progress spacecraft and transferred to a temporary storage location inside one of the station modules. It was taken outside and installed on the ERA aft facing base point on Nauka during the VKD-55 spacewalk. Further follow on hardware is not part of the modules activation outfitting spacewalk series and are yet to be assigned a flight.

With the help of the SKKO system, located on the outer surface of the MLM-U, 5 universal workstations URM-N will appear, each of which is equipped with three payload adapters, due to which the total number of places for accommodating scientific equipment will be 16 pieces. The total weight of the equipment installed at the SKKO is less than 400 kg (880 lb).

The portable work platform on Rassvet was also transferred over as the last MLM-outfitting in August 2023 during VKD-60 spacewalk, which can attach to the end of the ERA to allow cosmonauts to "ride" on the end of the arm during spacewalks. This completed the Nauka and ERA outfitting tasks.

=== RTOd heat radiator damaged ===
However, even after several months of outfitting EVAs and RTOd heat radiator installation, six months later, the RTOd radiator malfunctioned before active use of Nauka (the purpose of RTOd installation is to radiate heat from Nauka experiments). The malfunction, a leak, rendered the RTOd radiator unusable for Nauka. This is the third ISS radiator leak after Soyuz MS-22 and Progress MS-21 radiator leaks. If a spare RTOd is not available, Nauka experiments will have to rely on Nauka's main launch radiator and the module could never be utilized to its full capacity.

== Dockings ==
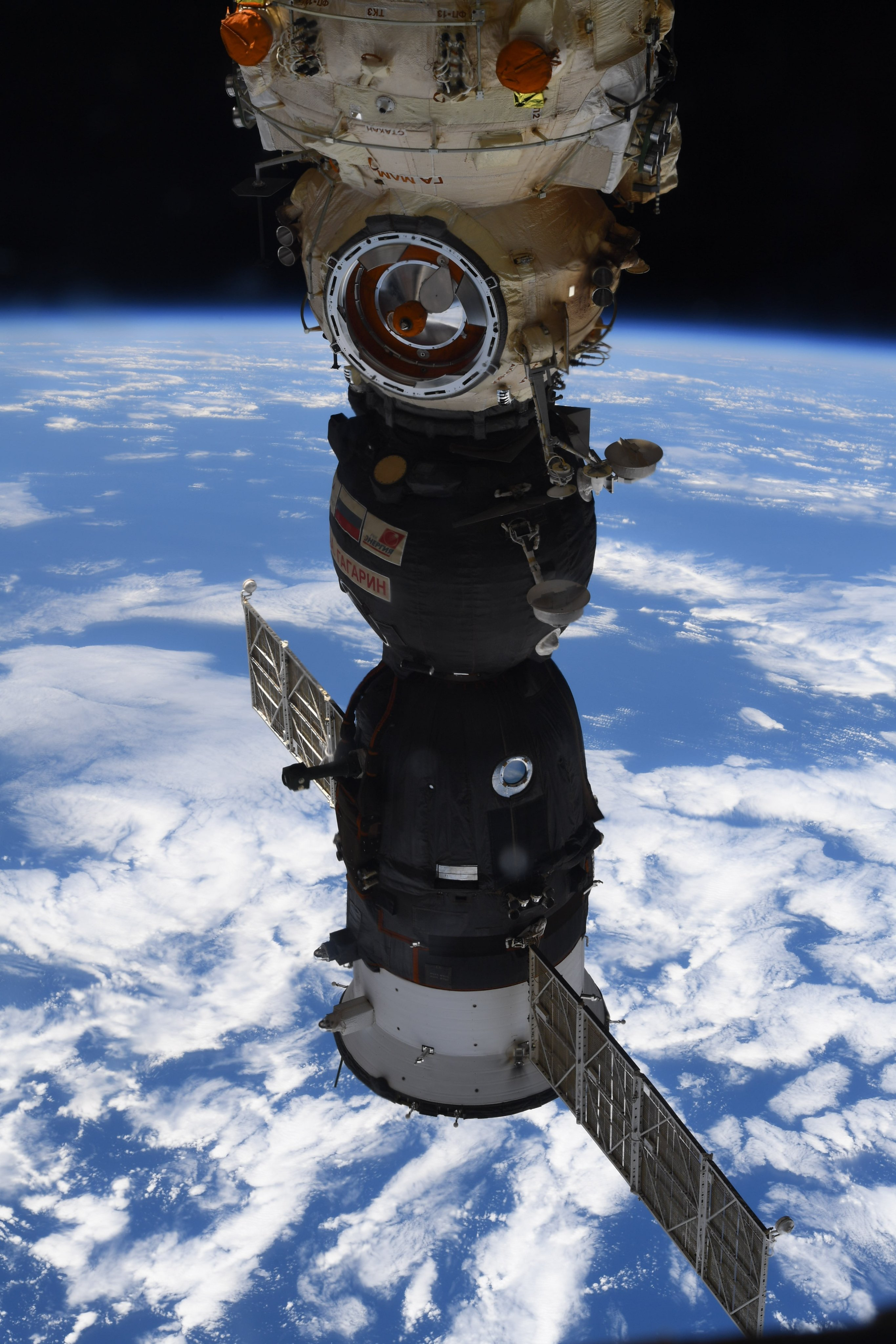
Soyuz MS-18 docked to Nauka after relocation (Note: The port had the docking adapter built to the SSVP-M or "Hybrid" standard, which consists of the traditional SSVP probe‑and‑drogue soft-dock mechanism and an APAS-95 hard-dock collar at that time. The docking adapter was undocked along with Progress MS-17 to make it a port compatible for Prichal docking.)

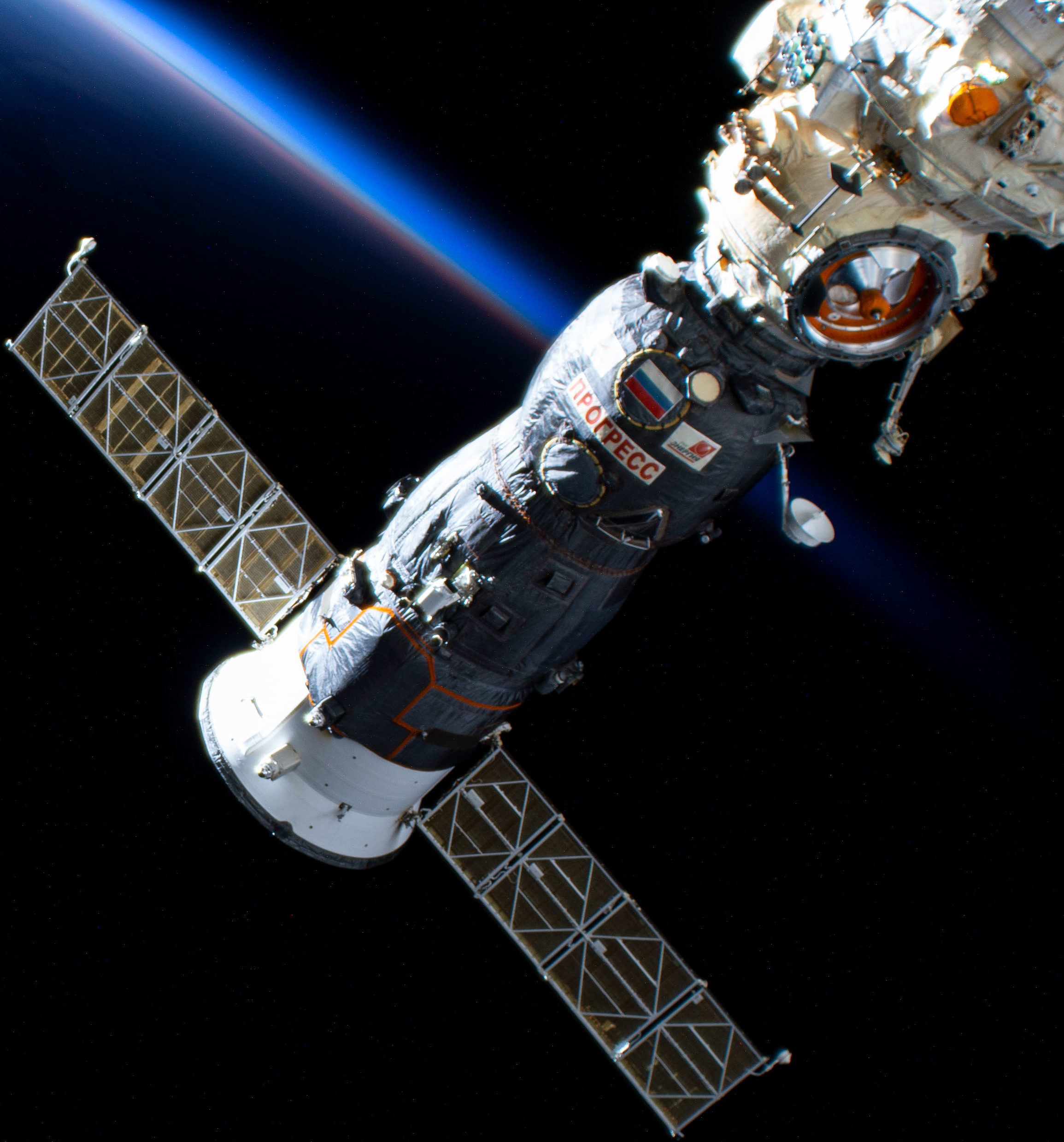
Russia's ISS Progress 78 cargo craft docked to the Nauka

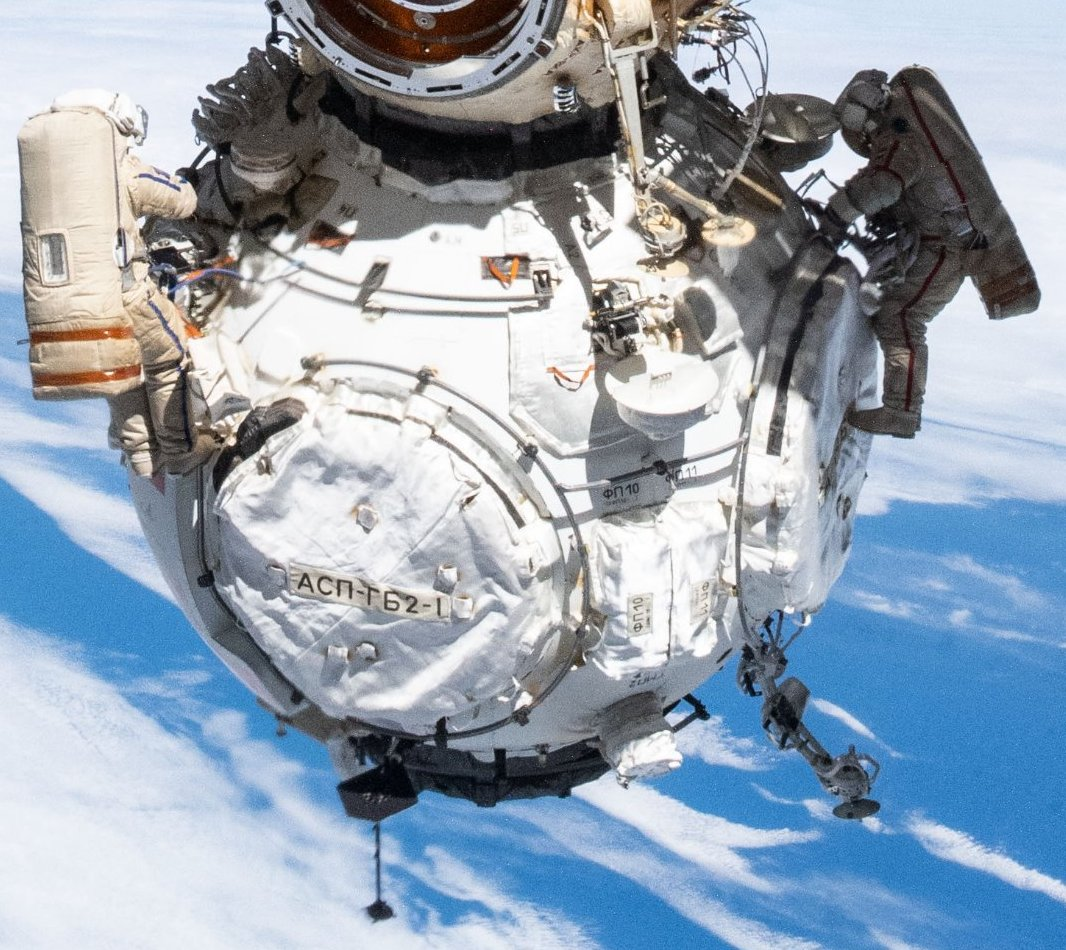
Russia's Prichal module docked to the Nauka

Vehicle	Mission	Docking	Undocking
Forward
Nauka experiment airlock	MLM outfittings	4 May 2023	N/A
Nadir
Soyuz MS Yu.A. Gagarin	Soyuz MS-18	28 September 2021	17 October 2021
Progress MS no. 446	Progress MS-17	22 October 2021	25 November 2021
Prichal	Progress M-UM	26 November 2021 (Note: This docking will be on a reconfigured port made for Prichal docking)	N/A
Zenith
Zvezda	ISS-1R	29 July 2021	N/A

== See also ==
- Scientific research on the ISS
- Russian Orbital Segment
- Russian Orbital Service Station
