= Space logistics =

Logistics for space travel

Space logistics is the discipline concerned with designing, operating, and sustaining space systems by managing the flow of materiel, services, and information across the space system lifecycle. It includes terrestrial logistics in support of space travel, including any additional "design and development, acquisition, storage, movement, distribution, maintenance, evacuation, and disposition of space materiel", movement of people in space (both routine and for medical and other emergencies), and contracting and supplying any required support services for maintaining space travel. The space logistics research and practice primarily focus on the modeling and management of the astro-logistics supply chain from Earth and on to destinations throughout the Solar System as well as the system architecture strategies to minimize both logistics requirements and operational costs of human and robotic operations in space.

== History ==
As early as 1960, Wernher von Braun spoke of the necessity and the underdevelopment of space logistics:

We have a logistics problem coming up in space ... that will challenge the thinking of the most visionary logistics engineers. As you know, we are currently investigating three regions of space: near-Earth, the lunar region, and the planets. While it is safe to say that all of us have undoubtedly been aware of many or most of the logistics requirements and problems in the discussion, at least in a general way, I think it is also safe to state that many of us have not realized the enormous scope of the tasks performed in the logistics area. I hope the discussions bring about a better understanding of the fact that logistics support is a major portion of most large development projects. Logistics support, in fact, is a major cause of the success or failure of many undertakings.

By 2004, with NASA beginning a governmental initiative to explore the Moon, Mars, and beyond, a number of deficiencies in both capacity and capability to support logistics needs even in low Earth orbit had been identified.

By 2005, analysts recognized the coming opportunity for the national governments involved with the Space Shuttle program to reduce costs by acquiring cargo transportation logistics services commercially following completion of the construction phase of the International Space Station, then expected by 2010.

=== Activities after 2005 ===
In the mid-2000s, NASA funded interdisciplinary research at the Massachusetts Institute of Technology to adapt terrestrial supply-chain and logistics methods for interplanetary space operations. The effort focused on campaign-level planning across Earth–Moon–Mars architectures, emphasizing network-based logistics modeling, uncertainty in demand and transportation capacity, and the integration of ground and in-space logistics systems. The research drew on lessons from commercial and military logistics systems on Earth, including applications in remote and resource-constrained environments. Its objective was to develop a generalized planning framework capable of supporting sustained human and robotic exploration beyond low Earth orbit.

=== Examples of supply classes ===
Among the supply classes identified by the MIT Space Logistics Center:

- Propellants and Fuels
- Crew Provisions and Operations
- Maintenance and Upkeep
- Stowage and Restraint
- Waste and Disposal
- Habitation and Infrastructure
- Transportation and Carriers
- Miscellaneous

In the category of space transportation for ISS Support, one might list:

- Space Shuttle (now retired)
- Progress spacecraft, Russian expendable unmanned resupply spacecraft
- Automated Transfer Vehicle, expendable unmanned resupply spacecraft developed by the European Space Agency
- H-II Transfer Vehicle (HTV) expendable unmanned resupply spacecraft developed by the Japan Aerospace Exploration Agency (JAXA)
- Dragon spacecraft, reusable cargo carrier developed by SpaceX

Tianzhou (spacecraft) is the only expendable unmanned resupply spacecraft to Chinese Space Station.

=== International Space Station as a logistics case study ===
The International Space Station (ISS) provides a detailed early case study of space logistics, illustrating the operational challenges associated with sustaining human presence in low Earth orbit. A snapshot of the logistics of the ISS was provided in 2005 via a comprehensive study done by James Baker and Frank Eichstadt.

==== Commercial opportunity ====
Analyses in the mid-2000s identified opportunities for commercial cargo and logistics services to support space operations following the retirement of the Space Shuttle. These studies noted that commercial providers could supply cargo transport, free-flying research platforms, and resupply services for both government and emerging private space stations, often at lower cost than government-developed systems due to reuse of existing infrastructure and economies of scale.

== Modeling and optimization for space logistics ==
Modern space logistics increasingly relies on formal optimization and network-based modeling approaches to coordinate transportation, storage, and scheduling across multi-mission campaigns, including Earth–Moon–Mars architectures. Space logistics is often modeled as a dynamic network problem, where transportation, storage, and timing constraints are jointly optimized. These approaches treat space infrastructure as an integrated system subject to launch constraints, vehicle availability, demand uncertainty, and long-term campaign objectives.

Common analysis methods in space logistics include:

- Combinatorial optimization
- Mixed-integer linear programming (MILP)
- Queueing theory

== Applications ==
Space logistics methods are applied across a range of space mission domains where transportation, storage, scheduling, and infrastructure decisions must be coordinated over long time horizons and under uncertainty.

- Space exploration campaign design
- General space mission design under uncertainty
- In-space servicing, assembly, and manufacturing (ISAM)
- Satellite constellation management

== Downmass ==
While space logistics often emphasizes upmass, referring to the delivery of payloads from Earth to orbit, many space activities also require the return of material, referred to as downmass. Downmass capacity is important for scientific sample return, on-orbit research and manufacturing, hardware refurbishment, and waste management, and can represent a critical constraint in mission and campaign design.

Historically, downmass limitations became apparent during International Space Station operations following the retirement of the Space Shuttle in 2011, when return capacity was temporarily restricted. Subsequent introduction of commercial cargo vehicles restored routine downmass capability, illustrating how return logistics can influence the feasibility and value of space-based activities.

== See also ==
- Autonomous logistics
- CSTS Crew Space Transportation System
- Commercial spaceflight
