= Progress MS-18 =

2021 Russian resupply spaceflight to the ISS

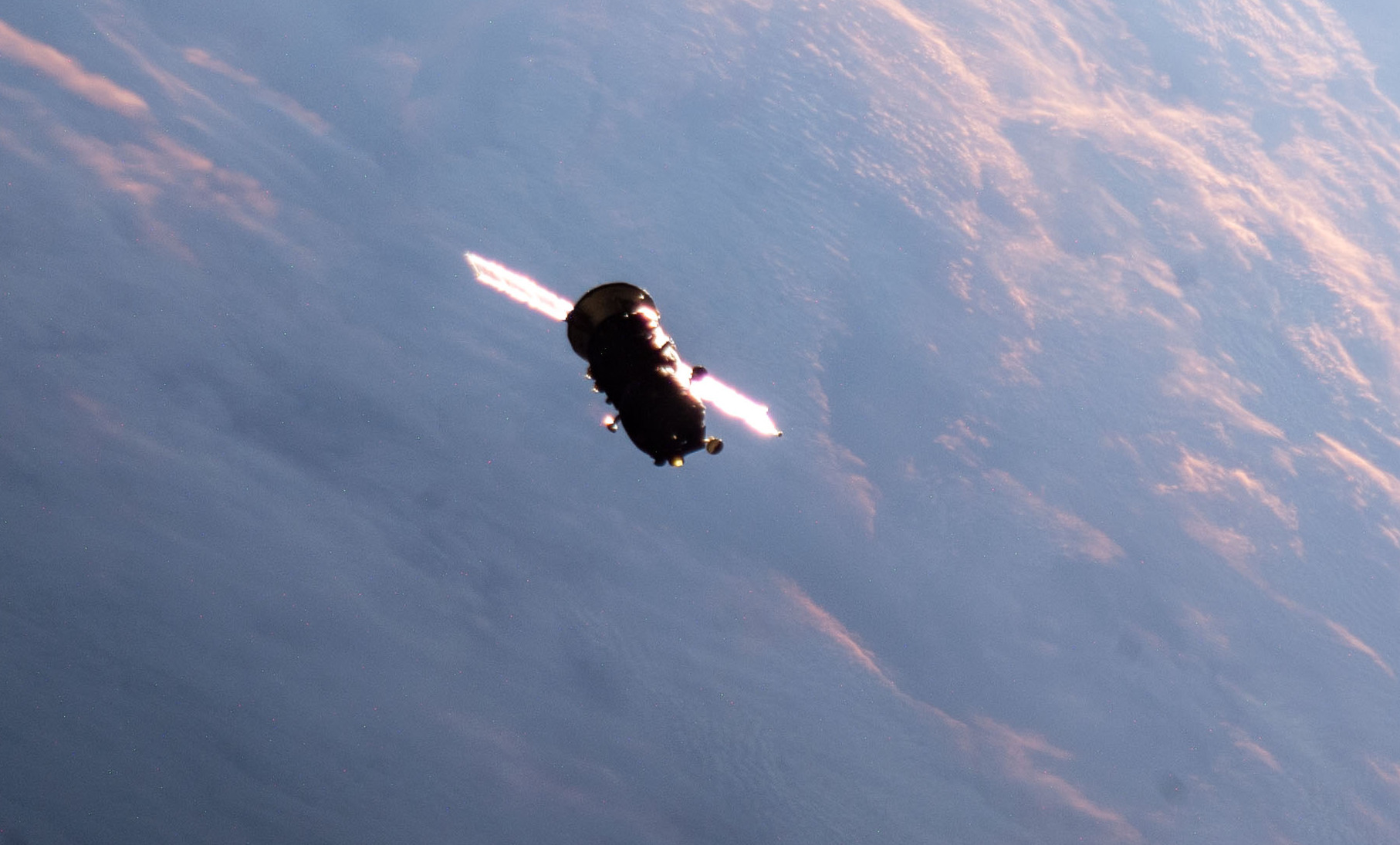
- Progress MS-18 after undocking
- Names: Progress 79P
- Mission type: ISS resupply
- Operator: Roscosmos
- COSPAR ID: 2021-098A
- SATCAT no.: 49379
- Mission duration: 216 days, 11 hours and 51 minutes

Spacecraft properties
- Spacecraft: Progress MS-18 No. 447
- Bus: Progress MS
- Manufacturer: Energia
- Launch mass: 7,000 kg (15,000 lb)
- Payload mass: 2,439 kg (5,377 lb)

Start of mission
- Launch date: 28 October 2021, 00:00:32 UTC
- Rocket: Soyuz-2.1a
- Launch site: Baikonur, Site 31/6
- Contractor: RKT Progress

End of mission
- Disposal: Deorbited
- Decay date: 1 June 2022, 11:51 UTC

Orbital parameters
- Reference system: Geocentric orbit
- Regime: Low Earth orbit
- Inclination: 51.65°

Docking with ISS
- Docking port: Zvezda aft
- Docking date: 30 October 2021, 01:31:19 UTC
- Undocking date: 1 June 2022, 08:03 UTC
- Time docked: 214 days, 6 hours and 32 minutes

Payload
- Cargo and LCCS part of MLM Means of Attachment of Large payloads
- Mass: 2,439 kg (5,377 lb)
- Pressurised: 1,509 kg (3,327 lb)
- Fuel: 470 kg (1,040 lb)
- Gaseous: 40 kg (88 lb)
- Water: 420 kg (930 lb)

Progress MS-18 (Russian: Прогресс МC-18), Russian production No. 447, identified by NASA as Progress 79P, was a Progress spaceflight operated by Roscosmos to resupply the International Space Station (ISS). This was the 170th flight of a Progress spacecraft.

== History ==
The Progress MS is an uncrewed freighter based on the Progress-M featuring improved avionics. This improved variant first launched on 21 December 2015. It has the following improvements:

- New external compartment that enables it to deploy satellites. Each compartment can hold up to four launch containers. First time installed on Progress MS-03.
- Enhanced redundancy thanks to the addition of a backup system of electrical motors for the docking and sealing mechanism.
- Improved Micrometeoroid (MMOD) protection with additional panels in the cargo compartment.
- Luch Russian relay satellites link capabilities enable telemetry and control even when not in direct view of ground radio stations.
- GNSS autonomous navigation enables real time determination of the status vector and orbital parameters dispensing with the need of ground station orbit determination.
- Real time relative navigation thanks to direct radio data exchange capabilities with the space station.
- New digital radio that enables enhanced TV camera view for the docking operations.
- The Ukrainian Chezara Kvant-V on board radio system and antenna/feeder system has been replaced with a Unified Command Telemetry System (UCTS).
- Replacement of the Kurs A with Kurs NA digital system.

== Launch ==
On 3 February 2021, Roskosmos approved the updated flight program to the International Space Station for 2021, highlighted with the addition of two permanent modules to the Russian Segment of the outpost. A short tourist visit to the ISS at the end of the year also got the green light.

A Soyuz-2.1a launched Progress MS-18 to the International Space Station from Baikonur Site 31 on 28 October 2021 on a two-day, 36 orbit rendezvous profile. If the air leak repairs planned for Zvezda's PrK chamber (delivery of sealing patches aboard Progress MS-16 in February 2021) were successful, then 3 hours 20 minutes after the launch Progress MS-18 would have attempted to automatically dock to Zvezda's aft port.

The vehicle docked to the aft port of the Zvezda Service Module (SM), on 30 October 2021, at 01:31:19 UTC, and was planned to remain in orbit for 215 days, supporting the Expedition 66 mission aboard the ISS.

== Cargo ==
The Progress MS-18 spacecraft was loaded with 2,439 kg (5,377 lb) of cargo, with 1,509 kg (3,327 lb) of this being dry cargo.

- Dry cargo: 1,509 kg (3,327 lb)
- Fuel: 470 kg (1,040 lb)
- Oxygen: 40 kg (88 lb)
- Water: 420 kg (930 lb)

=== Means of attachment of large payloads ===
It delivered LCCS part of MLM Means of Attachment of Large payloads (Sredstva Krepleniya Krupnogabaritnykh Obyektov, SKKO) work platform to ISS. Coupled with SCCS part of this MLM outfitting, delivered to ISS by Progress MS-21, during VKD-55 spacewalk, it was transferred over to Nauka and installed it at the ERA base point facing aft where ERA used to be, when it was launched, where it will be used to mount payloads on the exterior of Nauka module.

== Undocking and decay ==
The Progress MS-18 remained docked at the station until 1 June 2022, when it departed with trash and re-entered the Earth's atmosphere for destruction over the South Pacific Ocean.

== See also ==
- Uncrewed spaceflights to the International Space Station
