= Arktika-M =

Meteorology satellite system

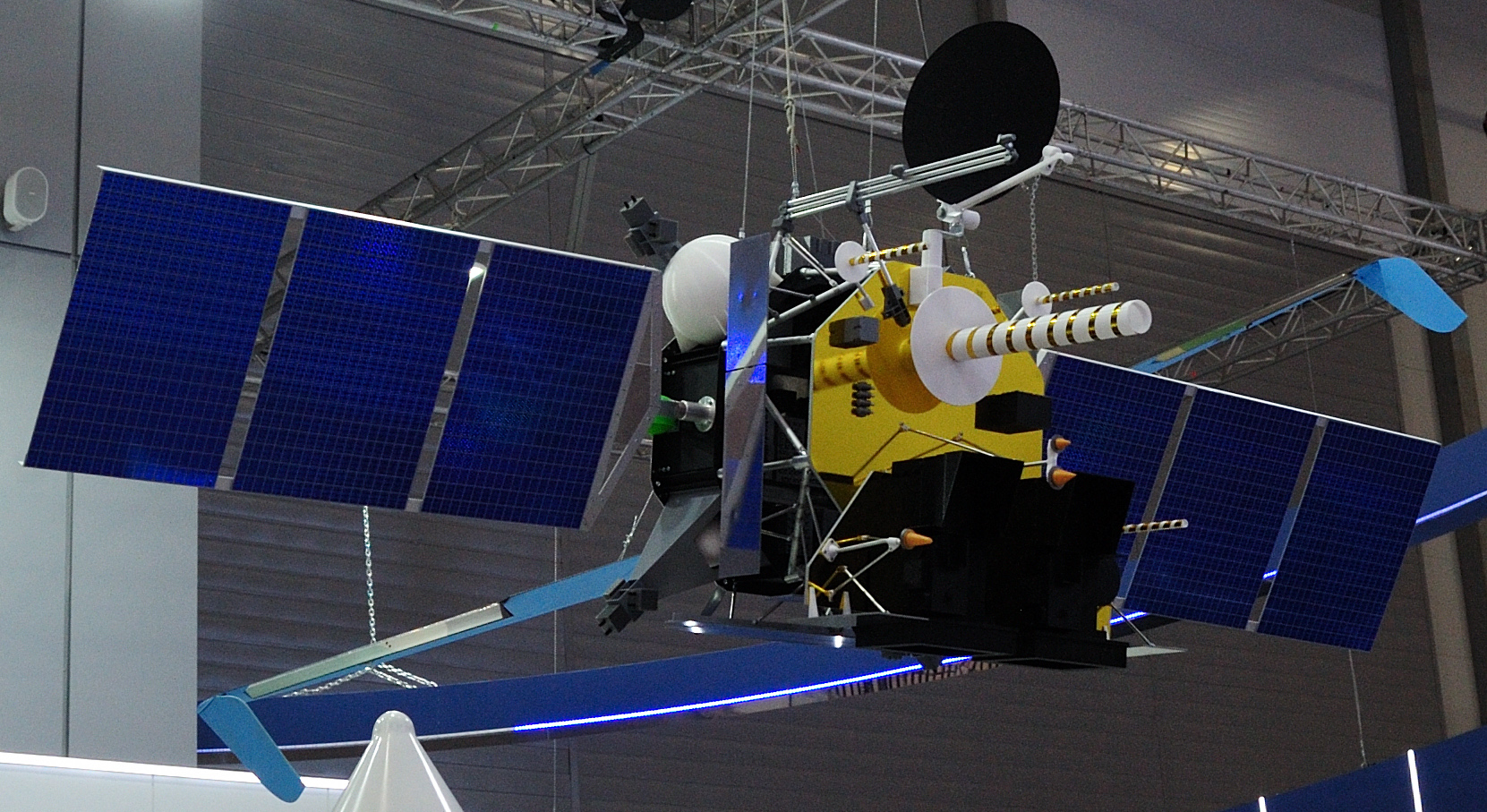
- Model of the Arktika-M at the Army-2023 exhibition
- Mission type: Meteorology
- Operator: Roscosmos
- Mission duration: 10 years (planned)

Spacecraft properties
- Manufacturer: NP0 Lavochkin
- Launch mass: 2,100 kg (4,600 lb)

Start of mission
- Launch date: 28 February 2021 (Arktika-M №1); 16 December 2023 (Arktika-M №2)
- Rocket: Soyuz-2.1b/Fregat-M
- Launch site: Baikonur, Site 31/6
- Contractor: Roscosmos

Orbital parameters
- Reference system: Geocentric orbit
- Regime: Molniya orbit

Arktika-M is a constellation of six HydroMeteorological satellite (Until 2023, Only two satellites are expected for the Constellation) developed by Roscosmos. Arktika-M satellites are based on the equipment of Elektro-L satellites. The satellites operates in Molniya orbit, Where existing Elektro-L capabilities were unusable from Geostationary orbit. In 2021 and 2023, two Arktika-M satellites were launched from the Baikonur Cosmodrome. By 2031, it is planned to launch four more hydrometeorological satellites of this type.

== Background ==
Arktika-M constellation of satellite is officially a part of Roscosmos Arktika Project. Arktika Project is planned to provide Earth observational services and emergency communications and navigational services in Russian Far-Northern Region.

== List of satellites ==
| Name | SATCAT | Launch date (UTC) | Launch vehicle | Orbital apsis | Inclination | Period (min) | Status |
|---|---|---|---|---|---|---|---|
| Arktika-M №1 | | 28 February 2021; 06:55:01 | Soyuz-2.1b/Fregat-M | | | | Operational |
| Arktika-M №2 | | 16 December 2023; 09:17:48 | Soyuz-2.1b/Fregat-M | | | | Operational |
| Arktika-M №3 | | 2025 | Soyuz-2.1b/Fregat-M | | | | Planned |
| Arktika-M №4 | | 2026 | Soyuz-2.1b/Fregat-M | | | | Planned |
| Arktika-M №5 | | 2027 | Soyuz-2.1b/Fregat-M | | | | Planned |
| Arktika-M №6 | | 2028-2030 | Soyuz-2.1b/Fregat-M | | | | Planned |

=== Arktika-M №1 ===
The first satellite of the Arktika-M series №1 was originally planned to be launched before November 25, 2015. But due to sanctions from the United States. the launch was postponed first to 2017, then to 2019 and then to 2020.

On February 28, 2021, the Arktika-M №1 spacecraft was launched on Soyuz-2.1b from Site 31/6 of the Baikonur Cosmodrome. The Fregat upper stage put the satellite into the targeted orbit. On March 22, 2021, the first images received from the satellite were published. In September 2021, flight tests of the Arktika-M №1 spacecraft were completed and the spacecraft was transferred to regular operation.

=== Arktika-M №2 ===
The launch of the Arktika-M №2 spacecraft took place on December 16, 2023 from the Site 31/6 of the Baikonur Cosmodrome. The satellite was launched into the targeted orbit by the Fregat upper stage.

Arktika-M satellites are in Molniya orbits with a high apogee (~40,000 km) and replacing each other in turn, receive data on meteorological parameters every 30 minutes: three-dimensional wind fields, temperature, atmospheric moisture content, ice conditions in the northern seas, total atmospheric water vapor and ozone content, etc., as well as heliogeophysical data over the entire vast Arctic area above 60° N. Reception, processing, archiving and distribution of satellite data from the Arktika spacecraft are carried out on the basis of the existing State Territorially Distributed Space Monitoring System of Roshydromet.

In May 2023, the Roscosmos State Corporation and NPO Lavochkin signed a government contract to upgrade the Arktika-M system to increase its orbital group to four spacecraft. The creation and launch of Arktika-M satellites №3, 4, 5 and 6 are planned before 2031. This will make it possible to halve the frequency of polar region surveys and conduct observations of the required area from different angles, as well as to detail ultra-short-term weather forecasts, increase the efficiency of detection and monitoring of hazardous natural phenomena and emergencies, and increase the accuracy of identifying clouds over snow and ice covers and determining their characteristics in the Arctic region and adjacent territories.

== Design ==
The Arktika-M spacecraft is based on the Navigator Bus.The mass of the satellites is 2,100 kg. The equipment installed on the satellite is almost identical to that of the Elektro-L satellites series . The payload consists of:

- Multi-zone Scanning Device for Hydrometeorological Support (MSU-GS) — provides images of the cloud layer and the Earth's surface. Works in the infrared and visible ranges.
- Heliogeophysical Equipment Complex (GGAK-VE).
- Equipment for transmitting data between ground-based Meteorological stations.
- Equipment of the Cospas-Sarsat system for retransmitting signals from emergency service.

== See also ==
- Roscosmos
- Elektro-L Russian Geostationary Meteorological constellation
- Meteor-M Russian Meteorological constellation that is SSO Orbit.
- Ekspress-RV Another constellation for Russian far-North.
