= List of spaceflight launches in January–June 2021 =

This article lists orbital and suborbital launches during the first half of the year 2021.

For all other spaceflight activities, see 2021 in spaceflight. For launches in the second half of 2021 see List of spaceflight launches in July–December 2021.

== Orbital launches ==
- ← Jan
- Feb
- Mar
- Apr
- May
- Jun
- Jul
- Aug
- Sep
- Oct
- Nov
- Dec →

Date and time (UTC)	Rocket	Flight number	Launch site		LSP	
Date and time (UTC)	Payload (⚀ = CubeSat)	Operator	Orbit	Function	Decay (UTC)	Outcome
Date and time (UTC)	Remarks					
=== January ===
8 January; 02:15	(United States) Falcon 9 Block 5	F9-104	(United States) Cape Canaveral SLC-40		(United States) SpaceX	
8 January; 02:15	(Turkey) Türksat 5A	Türksat	Geosynchronous	Communications	In orbit	Operational
17 January; 19:38:51	(United States) LauncherOne	F2	(United States) Cosmic Girl, Mojave		(United States) Virgin Orbit	
17 January; 19:38:51	⚀ (United States) CACTUS-1	Capitol Technology University	Low Earth	Technology demonstration	In orbit	Operational
17 January; 19:38:51	⚀ (United States) CAPE-3	UL Lafayette	Low Earth	Technology demonstration	In orbit	Operational
17 January; 19:38:51	⚀ (United States) ExoCube-2	Cal Poly	Low Earth	Atmospheric research	In orbit	Operational
17 January; 19:38:51	⚀ (United States) MiTEE	University of Michigan	Low Earth	Technology demonstration	15 June 2023	Successful
17 January; 19:38:51	⚀ (United States) PICS 1, 2	Brigham Young University	Low Earth	Technology demonstration	In orbit	Operational
17 January; 19:38:51	⚀ (United States) PolarCube	CU Boulder	Low Earth	Technology demonstration	6 June 2023	Successful
17 January; 19:38:51	⚀ (United States) Prometheus 2.8	U.S. Department of Defense	Low Earth	Technology demonstration	27 April 2023	Successful
17 January; 19:38:51	⚀ (United States) Prometheus 2.11	U.S. Department of Defense	Low Earth	Technology demonstration	2 May 2023	Successful
17 January; 19:38:51	⚀ (United States) Q-PACE (Cu-PACE)	UCF	Low Earth	Microgravity research	In orbit	Spacecraft failure
17 January; 19:38:51	⚀ (United States) RadFxSat-2 (Fox-1E)	Vanderbilt University	Low Earth	Technology demonstration	In orbit	Operational
17 January; 19:38:51	⚀ (United States) TechEdSat-7 (TES-7)	NASA Ames	Low Earth	Technology demonstration	4 May 2022	Successful
17 January; 19:38:51	Launch of NASA's ELaNa 20 mission. Second flight and first successful launch of LauncherOne.					
19 January; 16:25	(China) Long March 3B/E	3B-Y74	(China) Xichang LC-2		(China) CASC	
19 January; 16:25	(China) Tiantong-1 03	China Satcom	Geosynchronous	Communications	In orbit	Operational
20 January; 07:26	(United States) Electron	"Another One Leaves The Crust"	(New Zealand) Mahia LC-1A		(United States) Rocket Lab	
20 January; 07:26	(Germany) GMS-T	OHB SE / GMS	Low Earth	Communications	In orbit	Operational
20 January; 13:02	(United States) Falcon 9 Block 5	Starlink V1.0-L16	(United States) Kennedy LC-39A		(United States) SpaceX	
20 January; 13:02	(United States) Starlink × 60	SpaceX	Low Earth	Communications	In orbit	Operational
20 January; 13:02	First time that a Falcon 9 first stage booster (B1051) is re-flown and recovered for the 8th time and shortest turnaround for a booster so far (38 days).					
24 January; 15:00	(United States) Falcon 9 Block 5 / SHERPA-FX	Transporter-1	(United States) Cape Canaveral SLC-40		(United States) SpaceX	
24 January; 15:00	(United States) Starlink × 10	SpaceX	Low Earth (SSO)	Communications	25 January 2022	Successful
24 January; 15:00	(Italy) ION SCV-002 Laurentius	D-Orbit	Low Earth (SSO)	CubeSat deployer	In orbit	Operational
24 January; 15:00	(United States) Capella-3 (Whitney 1)	Capella Space	Low Earth (SSO)	Earth observation	26 February 2023	Successful
24 January; 15:00	(United States) Capella-4 (Whitney 2)	Capella Space	Low Earth (SSO)	Earth observation	8 April 2023	Successful
24 January; 15:00	(Canada) GHGSat-C2 (Hugo)	GHGSat	Low Earth (SSO)	Earth observation	In orbit	Operational
24 January; 15:00	(United States) Hawk-2A, 2B, 2C	HawkEye 360	Low Earth (SSO)	SIGINT / Technology demonstration	In orbit	Operational
24 January; 15:00	(Finland) ICEYE × 2	ICEYE	Low Earth (SSO)	Earth observation	In orbit	Operational
24 January; 15:00	(Japan) Izanami (QPS-SAR 2)	iQPS	Low Earth (SSO)	Earth observation	In orbit	Operational
24 January; 15:00	(United States) XR-1	ICEYE-US	Low Earth (SSO)	Earth observation	In orbit	Operational
24 January; 15:00	⚀ (United States) ARCE-1A, 1B, 1C	University of South Florida	Low Earth (SSO)	Technology demonstration	In orbit	Operational
24 January; 15:00	⚀ (Turkey) ASELSAT	ASELSAT	Low Earth (SSO)	Earth observation	In orbit	Operational
24 January; 15:00	⚀ (Switzerland) Astrocast × 5	Astrocast SA	Low Earth (SSO)	Communications	In orbit	Operational
24 January; 15:00	⚀ (United States) Charlie	Aurora Insight	Low Earth (SSO)	RF sensing	In orbit	Operational
24 January; 15:00	⚀ (United States) Flock 4s × 48	Planet Labs	Low Earth (SSO)	Earth observation	In orbit	Operational
24 January; 15:00	⚀ (Netherlands) Hiber Four	Hiber	Low Earth (SSO)	Remote sensing	In orbit	Spacecraft failure
24 January; 15:00	⚀ (Taiwan) IDEASSat	NSPO / NCU	Low Earth (SSO)	Technology demonstration	In orbit	Successful
24 January; 15:00	⚀ (Canada) Kepler × 8	Kepler	Low Earth (SSO)	Communications	In orbit	Operational
24 January; 15:00	⚀ (United States) Lemur-2 × 8	Spire Global	Low Earth (SSO)	Earth observation	In orbit	Operational
24 January; 15:00	⚀ (Germany) PIXL-1 (CubeLCT)	DLR / TESAT	Low Earth (SSO)	Technology demonstration	In orbit	Successful
24 January; 15:00	⚀ (United States) Prometheus 2.10	U.S. Department of Defense	Low Earth (SSO)	Technology demonstration	In orbit	Operational
24 January; 15:00	⚀ (United States) PTD-1	NASA Ames / Tyvak	Low Earth (SSO)	Technology demonstration	In orbit	Operational
24 January; 15:00	⚀ (Germany) SOMP-2b	TU Dresden	Low Earth (SSO)	Technology demonstration	In orbit	Operational
24 January; 15:00	⚀ (United States) SpaceBEE × 36	Swarm Technologies	Low Earth (SSO)	Communications	In orbit	Operational
24 January; 15:00	⚀ (France) UVSQ-SAT	UVSQ	Low Earth (SSO)	Technology demonstration	In orbit	Operational
24 January; 15:00	⚀ (United States) V-R3x × 3	NASA	Low Earth (SSO)	Communications	In orbit	Operational
24 January; 15:00	⚀ (Taiwan) YUSAT	NSPO	Low Earth (SSO)	Technology demonstration	In orbit	Successful
24 January; 15:00	Dedicated SmallSat Rideshare mission to Sun-synchronous orbit. ELaNa 35 launched aboard Spaceflight's Sherpa-FX1 as part of the SXRS-3 mission. Sherpa-FX1 hosts two on-board payloads: Celestis Horizon space burial flight and TAGSAT-1. A record 143 satellites were deployed, exceeding the previous record of 108 satellites launched by an Antares in 2018.					
29 January; 04:47	(China) Long March 4C	4C-Y31	(China) Jiuquan SLS-2		(China) CASC	
29 January; 04:47	(China) Yaogan 31-02A	CAS	Low Earth	Reconnaissance	In orbit	Operational
29 January; 04:47	(China) Yaogan 31-02B	CAS	Low Earth	Reconnaissance	In orbit	Operational
29 January; 04:47	(China) Yaogan 31-02C	CAS	Low Earth	Reconnaissance	In orbit	Operational
← Jan; Feb; Mar; Apr; May; Jun; Jul; Aug; Sep; Oct; Nov; Dec →; === February ===
1 February; 08:15	(China) Hyperbola-1	Y2	(China) Jiuquan LS-95A		(China) i-Space	
1 February; 08:15	(China) Tianshu	Xu Bing	Low Earth (SSO)	Space art	1 February	Launch failure
1 February; 08:15	Second Hyperbola-1 flight. Rocket disintegrated shortly after passing max q. Contrary to initial reports, Space Ark's Fangzhou-2 (Ark-2) satellite did not launch on this flight.					
2 February; 20:45:28	(Russia) Soyuz-2.1b		(Russia) Plesetsk Site 43/4		(Russia) RVSN RF	
2 February; 20:45:28	(Russia) Lotos-S1 №4 (Kosmos 2549)	VKS	Low Earth	ELINT	In orbit	Operational
4 February; 06:19	(United States) Falcon 9 Block 5	Starlink V1.0-L18	(United States) Cape Canaveral SLC-40		(United States) SpaceX	
4 February; 06:19	(United States) Starlink × 60	SpaceX	Low Earth	Communications	In orbit	Operational
4 February; 15:36	(China) Long March 3B/E	3B-Y77	(China) Xichang LC-3		(China) CASC	
4 February; 15:36	(China) TJS-6	SAST	Geosynchronous	SIGINT	In orbit	Operational
15 February; 04:45:05	(Russia) Soyuz-2.1a		(Kazakhstan) Baikonur Site 31/6		(Russia) Roscosmos	
15 February; 04:45:05	(Russia) Progress MS-16 / 77P	Roscosmos	Low Earth (ISS)	ISS logistics	26 July 2021; 14:51	Successful
15 February; 04:45:05	Progress 77 deorbited the Pirs module to make way for the arrival of Nauka in July 2021.					
16 February; 03:59:37	(United States) Falcon 9 Block 5	Starlink V1.0-L19	(United States) Cape Canaveral SLC-40		(United States) SpaceX	
16 February; 03:59:37	(United States) Starlink × 60	SpaceX	Low Earth	Communications	In orbit	Operational
16 February; 03:59:37	At least one of the engines of the first-stage booster, B1059.6, failed during or at the end of its re-entry burn, precluding recovery of the booster. It impacted the Atlantic away from the drone ship.					
20 February; 17:36:50	(United States) Antares 230+		(United States) MARS LP-0A		(United States) Northrop Grumman	
20 February; 17:36:50	(United States) Cygnus NG-15; S.S. Katherine Johnson	NASA	Low Earth (ISS)	ISS logistics	2 July; 01:30	Successful
20 February; 17:36:50	(Myanmar) (Japan) MMSATS-1 (Lawkanat-1)	MAEU / Hokkaido University	Low Earth	Earth observation	4 April 2023	Successful
20 February; 17:36:50	(United States) ThinSat-2 × 9	Virginia Space	Low Earth	Technology demonstration / Education	In orbit	Operational
20 February; 17:36:50	⚀ (Paraguay) (Japan) GuaraníSat-1	Kyushu Institute of Technology / Paraguayan Space Agency	Low Earth	Technology demonstration	5 July 2022	Successful
20 February; 17:36:50	⚀ (United States) Gunsmoke-J 2	USA SMDC / LANL	Low Earth	Technology demonstration	28 December 2023	Successful
20 February; 17:36:50	⚀ (Japan) HIROGARI (OPUSAT-II)	Osaka Prefecture University / Muroran Institute of Technology	Low Earth	Technology demonstration	15 April 2022	Successful
20 February; 17:36:50	⚀ (United States) IT-SPINS (SpaceBuoy)	MSU	Low Earth	Ionospheric research	In orbit	Operational
20 February; 17:36:50	⚀ (Philippines) Maya-2	Kyushu Institute of Technology	Low Earth	Technology demonstration	7 July 2022	Successful
20 February; 17:36:50	⚀ (United Arab Emirates) MYSat-2 (DhabiSat)	Khalifa University	Low Earth	Technology demonstration	In orbit	Operational
20 February; 17:36:50	⚀ (United States) ORCA-6	DARPA	Low Earth	Technology demonstration	31 January 2023	Successful
20 February; 17:36:50	⚀ (United States) ORCA-7	DARPA	Low Earth	Technology demonstration	31 January 2023	Successful
20 February; 17:36:50	⚀ (Japan) RSP-01	Ryman Sat Project	Low Earth	Technology demonstration	10 June 2022	Successful
20 February; 17:36:50	⚀ (Japan) STARS-EC (Sankō)	Shizuoka University	Low Earth	Technology demonstration	15 April 2022	Successful
20 February; 17:36:50	⚀ (Israel) TAU-SAT1	Tel Aviv University	Low Earth	Education	5 May 2022	Successful
20 February; 17:36:50	⚀ (Japan) TSURU	Kyushu Institute of Technology	Low Earth	Technology demonstration	5 July 2022	Successful
20 February; 17:36:50	⚀ (Japan) WARP-01 (Nichirin)	Warpspace	Low Earth	Technology demonstration	1 May 2022	Successful
20 February; 17:36:50	The ELaNa 33 mission (consisting of one satellite, IT-SPINS) launched on this resupply flight. Carrying two undisclosed satellites. First Paraguayan and Burmese satellites launched on this flight. Tsuru, Maya-2, GuaraníSat-1, OPUSAT-II, RSP-01, WARP-01, TAU-SAT1, and STARS-EC were deployed into orbit from ISS on 14 March 2021. MMSATS-1—Myanmar's first satellite—was temporarily held on board the station, its deployment delayed due to the 2021 Myanmar coup d'état. MMSATS-1 was deployed into orbit on 22 March 2021. IT-Spins and MySat-2 were deployed into orbit on 29 June 2021 from Cygnus NG-15 after its departure from the ISS.					
24 February; 02:22	(China) Long March 4C	4C-Y32	(China) Jiuquan SLS-2		(China) CASC	
24 February; 02:22	(China) Yaogan 31-03A	CAS	Low Earth	Reconnaissance	In orbit	Operational
24 February; 02:22	(China) Yaogan 31-03B	CAS	Low Earth	Reconnaissance	In orbit	Operational
24 February; 02:22	(China) Yaogan 31-03C	CAS	Low Earth	Reconnaissance	In orbit	Operational
28 February; 04:54	(India) PSLV-DL	C51	(India) Satish Dhawan FLP		(India) NSIL	
28 February; 04:54	(Brazil) Amazônia-1	INPE	Low Earth (SSO)	Earth observation	In orbit	Operational
28 February; 04:54	⚀ (Mexico) SAI-1 NanoConnect-2	UNAM	Low Earth (SSO)	Technology demonstration	25 November 2023	Successful
28 February; 04:54	⚀ (India) SDSAT	Space Kidz India	Low Earth (SSO)	Magnetospheric research / Education	18 July 2023	Successful
28 February; 04:54	⚀ (India) SindhuNetra	PESU / DRDO	Low Earth (SSO)	AIS ship tracking	14 December 2023	Successful
28 February; 04:54	⚀ (United States) SpaceBEE × 12	Swarm Technologies	Low Earth (SSO)	Communications	First: 24 November 2022; Last: 10 January 2023	Successful
28 February; 04:54	⚀ (India) JITSat (UNITYsat 1)	JIT	Low Earth (SSO)	Amateur radio / IoT	6 June 2023	Successful
28 February; 04:54	⚀ (India) GHRCESat (UNITYsat 2)	GHRCE	Low Earth (SSO)	Amateur radio / IoT	11 July 2023	Successful
28 February; 04:54	⚀ (India) SriShakthiSat (UNITYsat 3)	SIET	Low Earth (SSO)	Amateur radio / IoT	6 June 2023	Successful
28 February; 04:54	First Brazilian Earth observation satellite. It was the first dedicated commercial launch launched by NSIL.					
28 February; 06:55:01	(Russia) Soyuz-2.1b / Fregat		(Kazakhstan) Baikonur Site 31/6		(Russia) Roscosmos	
28 February; 06:55:01	(Russia) Arktika-M №1	Roscosmos	Molniya	Meteorology	In orbit	Operational
← Jan; Feb; Mar; Apr; May; Jun; Jul; Aug; Sep; Oct; Nov; Dec →; === March ===
4 March; 08:24:54	(United States) Falcon 9 Block 5	Starlink V1.0-L17	(United States) Kennedy LC-39A		(United States) SpaceX	
4 March; 08:24:54	(United States) Starlink × 60	SpaceX	Low Earth	Communications	In orbit	Operational
4 March; 08:24:54	Starlink V1.0-L17 mission launched after L18 and L19 due to multiple launch delays.					
11 March; 08:13:29	(United States) Falcon 9 Block 5	Starlink V1.0-L20	(United States) Cape Canaveral SLC-40		(United States) SpaceX	
11 March; 08:13:29	(United States) Starlink × 60	SpaceX	Low Earth	Communications	In orbit	Operational
11 March; 17:51:28	(China) Long March 7A	7A-Y2	(China) Wenchang LC-2		(China) CASC	
11 March; 17:51:28	(China) Shiyan 9	CAST	Geosynchronous	Technology demonstration	In orbit	Operational
11 March; 17:51:28	Reflight of the Long March 7A, which failed its maiden flight on 16 March 2020.					
13 March; 02:19	(China) Long March 4C	4C-Y42	(China) Jiuquan SLS-2		(China) CASC	
13 March; 02:19	(China) Yaogan 31-04A	CAS	Low Earth	Reconnaissance	In orbit	Operational
13 March; 02:19	(China) Yaogan 31-04B	CAS	Low Earth	Reconnaissance	In orbit	Operational
13 March; 02:19	(China) Yaogan 31-04C	CAS	Low Earth	Reconnaissance	In orbit	Operational
14 March; 10:01:26	(United States) Falcon 9 Block 5	Starlink V1.0-L21	(United States) Kennedy LC-39A		(United States) SpaceX	
14 March; 10:01:26	(United States) Starlink × 60	SpaceX	Low Earth	Communications	In orbit	Operational
14 March; 10:01:26	First time a first-stage booster flew and landed for the ninth time (B1051) and fastest turnaround time for a fairing half so far (49 days).					
22 March; 06:07:12	(Russia) Soyuz-2.1a / Fregat		(Kazakhstan) Baikonur Site 31/6		(Russia) GK Launch Services	
22 March; 06:07:12	(South Korea) CAS500-1	KARI	Low Earth (SSO)	Earth observation	In orbit	Operational
22 March; 06:07:12	(Japan) ELSA-d Servicer	Astroscale	Low Earth (SSO)	Technology demonstration	In orbit	Operational
22 March; 06:07:12	(Japan) ELSA-d Client	Astroscale	Low Earth (SSO)	Technology demonstration	In orbit	Operational
22 March; 06:07:12	(United Arab Emirates) DMSAT-1	MBRSC	Low Earth (SSO)	Earth observation	In orbit	Operational
22 March; 06:07:12	(Japan) Fukui Prefectural Satellite	Axelspace / FSTRA	Low Earth (SSO)	Earth observation	In orbit	Operational
22 March; 06:07:12	(Japan) GRUS-1 × 3	Axelspace	Low Earth (SSO)	Earth observation	In orbit	Operational
22 March; 06:07:12	(United States) Vigoride SC (mock-up)		Low Earth (SSO)	Mass simulator	In orbit	Successful
22 March; 06:07:12	⚀ (Israel) ADELIS-SAMSON x 3	Technion	Low Earth (SSO)	Satellite formation flying Technology demonstration	In orbit	Operational
22 March; 06:07:12	⚀ (Germany) BeeSat × 4	TU Berlin	Low Earth (SSO)	Technology demonstration	In orbit	Operational
22 March; 06:07:12	⚀ (Tunisia) ChallengeOne	Telnet Tunisie	Low Earth (SSO)	IoT	In orbit	Operational
22 March; 06:07:12	⚀ (Russia) CubeSX-HSE	HSE	Low Earth (SSO)	Earth observation Education	In orbit	Operational
22 March; 06:07:12	⚀ (Russia) CubeSX-Sirius-HSE	Sirius Educational Centre	Low Earth (SSO)	Earth observation Education	In orbit	Operational
22 March; 06:07:12	⚀ (Slovakia) GRBAlpha	TUKE	Low Earth (SSO)	Technology demonstration	In orbit	Operational
22 March; 06:07:12	⚀ (Netherlands) Hiber-3	Hiber	Low Earth (SSO)	IoT	In orbit	Spacecraft failure
22 March; 06:07:12	⚀ (Canada) Kepler × 2	Kepler	Low Earth (SSO)	Communications	In orbit	Operational
22 March; 06:07:12	⚀ (South Korea) KMSL	Chosun University	Low Earth (SSO)	Microgravity research	In orbit	Operational
22 March; 06:07:12	⚀ (Saudi Arabia) KSU_CubeSat	KSU	Low Earth (SSO)	Education	In orbit	Operational
22 March; 06:07:12	⚀ (United Kingdom) LacunaSat2-B	Lacuna Space	Low Earth (SSO)	IoT	In orbit	Operational
22 March; 06:07:12	⚀ (Saudi Arabia) Shaheen Sat 17 (Najm-1)	KACST	Low Earth (SSO)	Earth observation	In orbit	Operational
22 March; 06:07:12	⚀ (Brazil) NANOSATC-BR2	UFSM	Low Earth (SSO)	Ionospheric research	In orbit	Operational
22 March; 06:07:12	⚀ (Russia) OrbiCraft-Zorkiy	Sputnix	Low Earth (SSO)	Earth observation	In orbit	Operational
22 March; 06:07:12	⚀ (South Korea) Pumbaa	Yonsei University	Low Earth (SSO)	Solar observation	In orbit	Operational
22 March; 06:07:12	⚀ (South Korea) Timon	Yonsei University	Low Earth (SSO)	Solar observation	In orbit	Operational
22 March; 06:07:12	⚀ (Italy) (Kenya) WildTrackCube-SIMBA	Sapienza University of Rome / University of Nairobi / Machakos University	Low Earth (SSO)	Animal tracking	In orbit	Operational
22 March; 06:07:12	⚀ (Spain) 3B5GSAT	Sateliot / AEC	Low Earth (SSO)	IoT	In orbit	Operational
22 March; 06:07:12	(Italy) UNISAT-7	GAUSS Srl	Low Earth (SSO)	Satellite dispenser Technology demonstration	In orbit	Operational
22 March; 06:07:12	⚀ (Thailand) BCCSAT-1	Bangkok Christian College / KMUTNB	Low Earth (SSO)	Education	In orbit	Operational
22 March; 06:07:12	⚀ (Italy) FEES	GP Advanced Projects	Low Earth (SSO)	Technology demonstration	In orbit	Operational
22 March; 06:07:12	▫ (Argentina) DIY (ARDUIQUBE)	Diysatellite	Low Earth (SSO)	Education	22 July 2023	Successful
22 March; 06:07:12	▫ (Hungary) SMOG-1	BME	Low Earth (SSO)	Spectrum analysis	In orbit	Operational
22 March; 06:07:12	▫ (Italy) STECCO	Sapienza University of Rome	Low Earth (SSO)	Laser ranging	In orbit	Operational
22 March; 06:07:12	First fully commercial mission launched by GK Launch Services. ELSA-d will demonstrate space debris removal technology. ChallengeOne is the first Tunisian satellite. The Soyuz launch vehicle was painted white-blue to celebrate 60 years since the first human spaceflight in history, the Vostok 1 mission that launched Yuri Gagarin in space on 12 April 1961.					
22 March; 22:30	(United States) Electron	"They Go Up So Fast"	(New Zealand) Mahia LC-1A		(United States) Rocket Lab	
22 March; 22:30	(United States) Photon Pathstone	Rocket Lab	Low Earth	Space tug Technology demonstration	14 March 2023	Successful
22 March; 22:30	(United States) BlackSky 7 (Global-9)	BlackSky	Low Earth	Earth observation	In orbit	Operational
22 March; 22:30	⚀ (Australia) Centauri 3	Fleet Space	Low Earth	IoT	In orbit	Operational
22 March; 22:30	⚀ (United States) Gunsmoke-J 1	USA SMDC / LANL	Low Earth	Technology demonstration	In orbit	Operational
22 March; 22:30	⚀ (Australia) M2 × 2	UNSW	Low Earth	Technology demonstration	In orbit	Operational
22 March; 22:30	⚀ (Australia) Myriota 7	Myriota	Low Earth	IoT	In orbit	Operational
22 March; 22:30	⚀ (United States) Veery Hatchling	Care Weather Technologies	Low Earth	Meteorology	In orbit	Operational
22 March; 22:30	Second Photon satellite. This Photon will be used to perform tests in preparation for the upcoming CAPSTONE mission.					
24 March; 08:28:24	(United States) Falcon 9 Block 5	Starlink V1.0-L22	(United States) Cape Canaveral SLC-40		(United States) SpaceX	
24 March; 08:28:24	(United States) Starlink × 60	SpaceX	Low Earth	Communications	In orbit	Operational
25 March; 02:47:33	(Russia) Soyuz-2.1b / Fregat	ST30	(Russia) Vostochny Site 1S		(France) Arianespace / (Russia) Starsem	
25 March; 02:47:33	(United Kingdom) OneWeb × 36	OneWeb	Low Earth	Communications	In orbit	Operational
30 March; 22:45	(China) Long March 4C	4C-Y36	(China) Jiuquan SLS-2		(China) CASC	
30 March; 22:45	(China) Gaofen-12 02	CNSA	Low Earth (SSO)	Earth observation	In orbit	Operational
← Jan; Feb; Mar; Apr; May; Jun; Jul; Aug; Sep; Oct; Nov; Dec →; === April ===
7 April; 16:34:18	(United States) Falcon 9 Block 5	Starlink V1.0-L23	(United States) Cape Canaveral SLC-40		(United States) SpaceX	
7 April; 16:34:18	(United States) Starlink × 60	SpaceX	Low Earth	Communications	In orbit	Operational
8 April; 23:01	(China) Long March 4B	4B-Y49	(China) Taiyuan LC-9		(China) CASC	
8 April; 23:01	(China) Shiyan 6-03	CAST	Low Earth (SSO)	Technology demonstration	In orbit	Operational
8 April; 23:01	Shiyan 6-03 is demonstrating an ultra-dark nanocomposite coating, which aims to reduce stray light interference with onboard optical sensors.					
9 April; 07:42:40	(Russia) Soyuz-2.1a		(Kazakhstan) Baikonur Site 31/6		(Russia) Roscosmos	
9 April; 07:42:40	(Russia) Soyuz MS-18	Roscosmos	Low Earth (ISS)	Expedition 64/65	17 October; 04:35	Successful
23 April; 09:49:02	(United States) Falcon 9 Block 5	F9-114	(United States) Kennedy LC-39A		(United States) SpaceX	
23 April; 09:49:02	(United States) SpaceX Crew-2	SpaceX / NASA	Low Earth (ISS)	Expedition 65/66	9 November; 03:33:16	Successful
23 April; 09:49:02	Second operational Crew Dragon mission, as part of the Commercial Crew Program.					
25 April; 22:14:08	(Russia) Soyuz-2.1b / Fregat	ST31	(Russia) Vostochny Site 1S		(France) Arianespace / (Russia) Starsem	
25 April; 22:14:08	(United Kingdom) OneWeb × 36	OneWeb	Low Earth	Communications	In orbit	Operational
26 April; 20:47	(United States) Delta IV Heavy	D-386	(United States) Vandenberg SLC-6		(United States) ULA	
26 April; 20:47	(United States) KH-11 18 (USA-314)	NRO	Low Earth (SSO)	Reconnaissance	In orbit	Operational
26 April; 20:47	NROL-82 mission.					
27 April; 03:20	(China) Long March 6	Y5	(China) Taiyuan LC-16		(China) CASC	
27 April; 03:20	(China) Qilu-1	SDIIT	Low Earth (SSO)	Earth observation	In orbit	Operational
27 April; 03:20	(China) Qilu-4	SDIIT	Low Earth (SSO)	Earth observation	In orbit	Operational
27 April; 03:20	(China) Foshan-1	Ji Hua Laboratory	Low Earth (SSO)	Earth observation	In orbit	Operational
27 April; 03:20	⚀ (China) Zhongan Guotong-1 (HS-1)	Hangsheng Satellite / Zhongan Guotong Satellite Technology Development	Low Earth (SSO)	Earth observation	In orbit	Operational
27 April; 03:20	⚀ (China) Tianqi-9	Guodian Gaoke	Low Earth (SSO)	IoT	In orbit	Operational
27 April; 03:20	⚀ (China) Origin Space NEO-1	Origin Space	Low Earth (SSO)	Technology demonstration	In orbit	Operational
27 April; 03:20	⚀ (China) Tai King II 01	MinoSpace	Low Earth (SSO)	Earth observation	In orbit	Operational
27 April; 03:20	⚀ (China) Golden Bauhinia-1 01	ZeroG Lab	Low Earth (SSO)	Earth observation	In orbit	Operational
27 April; 03:20	⚀ (China) Golden Bauhinia-1 02	ZeroG Lab	Low Earth (SSO)	Earth observation	In orbit	Operational
27 April; 03:20	First Long March Express commercial rideshare mission with launch services contracted by CGWIC.					
29 April; 01:50:00	(Italy) Vega	VV18	(France) Kourou ELV		(France) Arianespace	
29 April; 01:50:00	(France) Pléiades-Neo 3	Airbus Defence and Space	Low Earth (SSO)	Earth observation	In orbit	Operational
29 April; 01:50:00	(Norway) NorSat-3	NOSA	Low Earth (SSO)	AIS ship tracking	In orbit	Operational
29 April; 01:50:00	⚀ (United States) Bravo	Aurora Insight	Low Earth (SSO)	RF sensing	In orbit	Operational
29 April; 01:50:00	⚀ (France) ELO Alpha	Eutelsat	Low Earth (SSO)	IoT	In orbit	Operational
29 April; 01:50:00	⚀ (United States) Lemur-2 × 2	Spire Global	Low Earth (SSO)	Earth observation	In orbit	Operational
29 April; 01:50:00	Small Satellites Mission Service (SSMS) piggyback mission. Return to flight for Vega after the November 2020 launch failure.					
29 April; 03:23:15	(China) Long March 5B	5B-Y2	(China) Wenchang LC-1		(China) CASC	
29 April; 03:23:15	(China) Tianhe	CMSA	Low Earth	Space station assembly	In orbit	Operational
29 April; 03:23:15	Tianhe is the core module of the Tiangong space station, providing life support and living quarters for three crew members, and guidance, navigation and attitude control for the station.					
29 April; 03:44	(United States) Falcon 9 Block 5	Starlink V1.0-L24	(United States) Cape Canaveral SLC-40		(United States) SpaceX	
29 April; 03:44	(United States) Starlink × 60	SpaceX	Low Earth	Communications	In orbit	Operational
30 April; 07:27	(China) Long March 4C	4C-Y34	(China) Jiuquan SLS-2		(China) CASC	
30 April; 07:27	(China) Yaogan 34	CAS	Low Earth	Reconnaissance	In orbit	Operational
← Jan; Feb; Mar; Apr; May; Jun; Jul; Aug; Sep; Oct; Nov; Dec →; === May ===
4 May; 19:01:07	(United States) Falcon 9 Block 5	Starlink V1.0-L25	(United States) Kennedy LC-39A		(United States) SpaceX	
4 May; 19:01:07	(United States) Starlink × 60	SpaceX	Low Earth	Communications	In orbit	Operational
6 May; 18:11	(China) Long March 2C	2C-Y47	(China) Xichang LC-3		(China) CASC	
6 May; 18:11	(China) Yaogan 30-08A	CAS	Low Earth	Reconnaissance	In orbit	Operational
6 May; 18:11	(China) Yaogan 30-08B	CAS	Low Earth	Reconnaissance	In orbit	Operational
6 May; 18:11	(China) Yaogan 30-08C	CAS	Low Earth	Reconnaissance	In orbit	Operational
6 May; 18:11	⚀ (China) Tianqi-12	Guodian Gaoke	Low Earth	IoT	In orbit	Operational
9 May; 06:42	(United States) Falcon 9 Block 5	Starlink V1.0-L27	(United States) Cape Canaveral SLC-40		(United States) SpaceX	
9 May; 06:42	(United States) Starlink × 60	SpaceX	Low Earth	Communications	In orbit	Operational
9 May; 06:42	First time a first-stage booster flew and landed for the tenth time (B1051).					
15 May; 11:11	(United States) Electron	"Running Out of Toes"	(New Zealand) Mahia LC-1A		(United States) Rocket Lab	
15 May; 11:11	(United States) BlackSky 8	BlackSky	Low Earth (SSO)	Earth observation	15 May	Launch failure
15 May; 11:11	(United States) BlackSky 9	BlackSky	Low Earth (SSO)	Earth observation	15 May	Launch failure
15 May; 11:11	First of four dedicated launches for BlackSky. Second ocean splashdown recovery mission for the first stage. An anomaly occurred at second stage ignition, causing the vehicle to spin out of control. The first stage successfully splashed down using parachutes in the Pacific Ocean.					
15 May; 22:56	(United States) Falcon 9 Block 5	Starlink V1.0-L26	(United States) Kennedy LC-39A		(United States) SpaceX	
15 May; 22:56	(United States) Starlink × 52	SpaceX	Low Earth	Communications	In orbit	Operational
15 May; 22:56	(United States) Capella-6 (Whitney 4)	Capella Space	Low Earth	Earth observation	In orbit	Operational
15 May; 22:56	⚀ (United States) Tyvak-0130	Tyvak / LLNL	Low Earth	Earth observation	In orbit	Operational
15 May; 22:56	Starlink SmallSat Rideshare mission.					
18 May; 17:37	(United States) Atlas V 421	AV-091	(United States) Cape Canaveral SLC-41		(United States) ULA	
18 May; 17:37	(United States) SBIRS-GEO 5 (USA-315)	U.S. Space Force	Geosynchronous	Early warning	In orbit	Operational
18 May; 17:37	⚀ (United States) TDO-3	U.S. Air Force Academy	Highly elliptical	Technology demonstration	27 September 2022	Successful
18 May; 17:37	⚀ (United States) TDO-4	U.S. Air Force Academy	Highly elliptical	Technology demonstration	18 September 2022	Successful
19 May; 04:03	(China) Long March 4B	4B-Y48	(China) Jiuquan SLS-2		(China) CASC	
19 May; 04:03	(China) HaiYang-2D	Ministry of Natural Resources	Low Earth	Oceanography	In orbit	Operational
26 May; 18:59	(United States) Falcon 9 Block 5	Starlink V1.0-L28	(United States) Cape Canaveral SLC-40		(United States) SpaceX	
26 May; 18:59	(United States) Starlink × 60	SpaceX	Low Earth	Communications	In orbit	Operational
26 May; 18:59	First Starlink orbital shell, consisting of 1,584 satellites orbiting at an altitude of 550 kilometres (340 mi), was completed with this launch. Last launch of Starlink Group 1 Satellites.					
28 May; 17:38:39	(Russia) Soyuz-2.1b / Fregat	ST32	(Russia) Vostochny Site 1S		(France) Arianespace / (Russia) Starsem	
28 May; 17:38:39	(United Kingdom) OneWeb × 36	OneWeb	Low Earth	Communications	In orbit	Operational
29 May; 12:55:29	(China) Long March 7	Y3	(China) Wenchang LC-2		(China) CASC	
29 May; 12:55:29	(China) Tianzhou 2	CMSA	Low Earth (TSS)	Space logistics	31 March 2022; 10:40	Successful
29 May; 12:55:29	First cargo flight to the Tiangong space station.					
← Jan; Feb; Mar; Apr; May; Jun; Jul; Aug; Sep; Oct; Nov; Dec →; === June ===
2 June; 16:17:04	(China) Long March 3B/E	3B-Y72	(China) Xichang LC-2		(China) CASC	
2 June; 16:17:04	(China) Fengyun 4B	CMA	Geosynchronous	Meteorology	In orbit	Operational
3 June; 17:29:15	(United States) Falcon 9 Block 5	F9-120	(United States) Kennedy LC-39A		(United States) SpaceX	
3 June; 17:29:15	(United States) SpaceX CRS-22	NASA	Low Earth (ISS)	ISS logistics	10 July; 03:29	Successful
3 June; 17:29:15	⚀ (Japan) G-SATELLITE 2 (BD-28)	OneTeam / TOCOG	Low Earth	Space advertising	15 September 2022	Successful
3 June; 17:29:15	⚀ (Mauritius) MIR-SAT1	MRIC	Low Earth	Technology demonstration	18 April 2022	Successful
3 June; 17:29:15	⚀ (United States) RamSat	Robertsville Middle School	Low Earth	Education	12 October 2022	Successful
3 June; 17:29:15	⚀ (United Kingdom) SOAR	University of Manchester	Low Earth	Technology demonstration	14 March 2022	Successful
3 June; 17:29:15	The ELaNa 36 mission (consisting of one satellite, RamSat) launched on this resupply flight. RamSat and SOAR were deployed into orbit from ISS on 14 June 2021. MIR-SAT1 and G-SATELLITE 2 were deployed on 22 June 2021. Two Roll Out Solar Array (iROSA) units were delivered to the station to supplement the existing ISS Solar Arrays.					
6 June; 04:26	(United States) Falcon 9 Block 5	F9-121	(United States) Cape Canaveral SLC-40		(United States) SpaceX	
6 June; 04:26	(United States) SXM-8	SiriusXM	Geosynchronous	Communications	In orbit	Operational
11 June; 03:03	(China) Long March 2D	2D-Y54	(China) Taiyuan LC-9		(China) CASC	
11 June; 03:03	(China) Beijing-3A	China Spacesat	Low Earth (SSO)	Earth observation	In orbit	Operational
11 June; 03:03	⚀ (China) Hisea-2	Xiamen University	Low Earth (SSO)	Earth observation	In orbit	Operational
11 June; 03:03	⚀ (China) Yang Wang-1	Origin Space	Low Earth (SSO)	Space telescope / Asteroid cataloging	In orbit	Operational
11 June; 03:03	⚀ (China) Tianjian (TKSY01-TJ)	PLASSF Space Engineering University	Low Earth (SSO)	Technology demonstration	In orbit	Operational
12 June	(Iran) Simorgh		(Iran) Semnan LP-2		(Iran) ISA	
12 June	(Iran) Unknown payload		Low Earth		12 June	Launch failure
12 June	Failed to reach orbit.					
13 June; 08:11	(United States) Pegasus-XL	F45	(United States) Stargazer, Vandenberg		(United States) Northrop Grumman	
13 June; 08:11	(United States) Odyssey	U.S. Space Force	Low Earth (SSO)	Space domain awareness	18 December 2022	Successful
13 June; 08:11	Tactically Responsive Launch-2 (TacRL-2) mission.					
15 June; 13:35	(United States) Minotaur I		(United States) MARS LP-0B		(United States) Northrop Grumman	
15 June; 13:35	(United States) USA-316	NRO	Low Earth	Reconnaissance	In orbit	Operational
15 June; 13:35	(United States) USA-317	NRO	Low Earth	Reconnaissance	In orbit	Operational
15 June; 13:35	(United States) USA-318	NRO	Low Earth	Reconnaissance	In orbit	Operational
15 June; 13:35	NROL-111 mission.					
17 June; 01:22:27	(China) Long March 2F	2F-Y12	(China) Jiuquan SLS-1		(China) CASC	
17 June; 01:22:27	(China) Shenzhou 12	CMSA	Low Earth (TSS)	Crewed spaceflight	17 September; 05:34	Successful
17 June; 01:22:27	First crewed flight to the Tianhe core module of the Tiangong space station, with astronauts Nie Haisheng, Liu Boming and Tang Hongbo onboard.					
17 June; 16:09:35	(United States) Falcon 9 Block 5	F9-122	(United States) Cape Canaveral SLC-40		(United States) SpaceX	
17 June; 16:09:35	(United States) GPS IIIA-05 Neil Armstrong (USA-319)	U.S. Space Force	Medium Earth	Navigation	In orbit	Operational
17 June; 16:09:35	First DoD payload to fly on the single-stick Falcon 9 with a flight-proven first stage booster; the booster B1062 previously launched GPS IIIA-04 Sacagawea in November 2020. Named after American astronaut Neil Armstrong, the first person to walk on the Moon.					
18 June; 06:30	(China) Long March 2C	2C-Y48	(China) Xichang LC-3		(China) CASC	
18 June; 06:30	(China) Yaogan 30-09A	CAS	Low Earth	Reconnaissance	In orbit	Operational
18 June; 06:30	(China) Yaogan 30-09B	CAS	Low Earth	Reconnaissance	In orbit	Operational
18 June; 06:30	(China) Yaogan 30-09C	CAS	Low Earth	Reconnaissance	In orbit	Operational
18 June; 06:30	⚀ (China) Tianqi-14	Guodian Gaoke	Low Earth	IoT	In orbit	Operational
25 June; 19:50:00	(Russia) Soyuz-2.1b		(Russia) Plesetsk Site 43/4		(Russia) RVSN RF	
25 June; 19:50:00	(Russia) Pion-NKS №1 (Kosmos 2550)	VKS	Low Earth	SIGINT	In orbit	Operational
25 June; 19:50:00	Part of the Russian Liana SIGINT system.					
29 June; 23:27:20	(Russia) Soyuz-2.1a		(Kazakhstan) Baikonur Site 31/6		(Russia) Roscosmos	
29 June; 23:27:20	(Russia) Progress MS-17 / 78P	Roscosmos	Low Earth (ISS)	ISS logistics	25 November; 14:34	Successful
30 June; 14:47	(United States) LauncherOne	"Tubular Bells, Part One"	(United States) Cosmic Girl, Mojave		(United States) VOX Space	
30 June; 14:47	⚀ (Netherlands) BRIK-II	RNLAF	Low Earth	Technology demonstration	In orbit	Operational
30 June; 14:47	⚀ (United States) CNCE Blk 1 × 2	MDA	Low Earth	Technology demonstration	CNCE1: 31 October 2023; CNCE3: 31 October 2023	Successful
30 June; 14:47	⚀ (United States) Gunsmoke-J 3	USA SMDC / LANL	Low Earth	Technology demonstration	In orbit	Operational
30 June; 14:47	⚀ (United States) HALO-Net Free Flyer	U.S. Navy	Low Earth	Technology demonstration	25 November 2023	Successful
30 June; 14:47	⚀ (Poland) STORK-4	SatRevolution	Low Earth	Earth observation	3 October 2023	Successful
30 June; 14:47	⚀ (Poland) STORK-5 (MARTA)	SatRevolution	Low Earth	Earth observation	22 October 2023	Successful
30 June; 14:47	The launch campaign is named after Tubular Bells, the first record produced by Virgin Records in 1973. STP-27VPA is composed of four military CubeSats: Gunsmoke-J 3, HALO-Net Free Flyer, and two CNCE Blk 1 satellites.					
30 June; 19:31	(United States) Falcon 9 Block 5	Transporter-2	(United States) Cape Canaveral SLC-40		(United States) SpaceX	
30 June; 19:31	(Italy) ION SCV-003 Dauntless David	D-Orbit	Low Earth (SSO)	CubeSat deployer	In orbit	Operational
30 June; 19:31	(United States) Sherpa-FX2	Spaceflight, Inc.	Low Earth (SSO)	CubeSat deployer	In orbit	Operational
30 June; 19:31	(United States) Sherpa-LTE1	Spaceflight, Inc.	Low Earth (SSO)	Space tug	In orbit	Operational
30 June; 19:31	(United States) Starlink × 3	SpaceX	Low Earth (SSO)	Communications	In orbit	Operational
30 June; 19:31	(United States) Aurora (Shasta)	Orbital Sidekick / Astro Digital	Low Earth (SSO)	Earth observation	In orbit	Operational
30 June; 19:31	(United States) Capella-5 (Whitney 3)	Capella Space	Low Earth (SSO)	Earth observation	23 February 2023	Successful
30 June; 19:31	(United States) GNOMES-2	PlanetIQ	Low Earth (SSO)	Radio occultation	In orbit	Operational
30 June; 19:31	(United States) Hawk-3A, 3B, 3C	HawkEye 360	Low Earth (SSO)	SIGINT / Technology demonstration	In orbit	Operational
30 June; 19:31	(Finland) ICEYE × 4	ICEYE	Low Earth (SSO)	Earth observation	In orbit	Operational
30 June; 19:31	(United States) Lynk-06 (Shannon)	Lynk Global	Low Earth (SSO)	Technology demonstration	In orbit	Operational
30 June; 19:31	(Argentina) ÑuSat × 4	Satellogic	Low Earth (SSO)	Earth observation	In orbit	Operational
30 June; 19:31	(United States) Tanker-001 Tenzing	Orbit Fab / Accion Systems	Low Earth (SSO)	Propellant depot Technology demonstration	In orbit	Operational
30 June; 19:31	(Germany) TUBIN	TU Berlin	Low Earth (SSO)	Technology demonstration	In orbit	Operational
30 June; 19:31	(United States) Umbra-2001	Umbra Lab	Low Earth (SSO)	Technology demonstration	In orbit	Operational
30 June; 19:31	(United States) YAM-2	Loft Orbital	Low Earth (SSO)	Technology demonstration	In orbit	Operational
30 June; 19:31	(United States) YAM-3	Loft Orbital	Low Earth (SSO)	Technology demonstration	In orbit	Operational
30 June; 19:31	⚀ (Belgium) ARTHUR-1	Aerospacelab	Low Earth (SSO)	Earth observation	In orbit	Operational
30 June; 19:31	⚀ (Switzerland) Astrocast × 5	Astrocast SA	Low Earth (SSO)	Communications	In orbit	Operational
30 June; 19:31	⚀ (Australia) Centauri 4 (Tyvak-0211)	Fleet Space	Low Earth (SSO)	IoT	In orbit	Operational
30 June; 19:31	⚀ (United States) (South Africa) (Mexico) D2/AtlaCom-1	NanoAvionics / Dragonfly Aerospace / Space JLTZ	Low Earth (SSO)	Technology demonstration	In orbit	Operational
30 June; 19:31	⚀ (United States) EG-3 (Tyvak-0173)	EchoStar	Low Earth (SSO)	Mobile-satellite service	In orbit	Operational
30 June; 19:31	⚀ (United Kingdom) Faraday Phoenix	In-Space Missions	Low Earth (SSO)	Technology demonstration	In orbit	Operational
30 June; 19:31	⚀ (United Arab Emirates) Ghalib	Marshall Intech	Low Earth (SSO)	Technology demonstration	In orbit	Operational
30 June; 19:31	⚀ (Luxembourg) KSM-2 × 4	Kleos Space	Low Earth (SSO)	Navigation	In orbit	Operational
30 June; 19:31	⚀ (United States) Lemur-2 × 6	Spire Global	Low Earth (SSO)	Earth observation	In orbit	Operational
30 June; 19:31	⚀ (United States) LINCS 1, 2	GA-EMS	Low Earth (SSO)	Laser communications	In orbit	Spacecraft failure
30 June; 19:31	⚀ (United States) Mandrake 2A, 2B	DARPA	Low Earth (SSO)	Laser communications	In orbit	Operational
30 June; 19:31	⚀ (Thailand) Napa-2 (RTAF-SAT 2)	RTAF	Low Earth (SSO)	Earth observation	In orbit	Operational
30 June; 19:31	⚀ (Spain) NEPTUNO	Elecnor Deimos	Low Earth (SSO)	Technology demonstration	In orbit	Operational
30 June; 19:31	⚀ (United States) PACE-1	NASA	Low Earth (SSO)	Technology demonstration	In orbit	Operational
30 June; 19:31	⚀ (Mexico) PAINANI-II	CISESE	Low Earth (SSO)	Technology demonstration	In orbit	Operational
30 June; 19:31	⚀ (Kuwait) QMR-KWT	Orbital Space	Low Earth (SSO)	Education	In orbit	Operational
30 June; 19:31	⚀ (Bulgaria) SPARTAN	EnduroSat	Low Earth (SSO)	Technology demonstration	In orbit	Operational
30 June; 19:31	⚀ (United States) SpaceBEE × 24	Swarm Technologies	Low Earth (SSO)	Communications	In orbit	Operational
30 June; 19:31	⚀ (New Zealand) SpaceBEE NZ × 4	Swarm Technologies	Low Earth (SSO)	Communications	First: 12 September 2023; Last: 19 September 2023	Successful
30 June; 19:31	⚀ (Luxembourg) (Rwanda) Tiger-2 (Ayan-21)	OQ Technology	Low Earth (SSO)	IoT	In orbit	Operational
30 June; 19:31	⚀ (United States) TROPICS Pathfinder	NASA	Low Earth (SSO)	Meteorology	In orbit	Operational
30 June; 19:31	⚀ (Finland) W-Cube	Reaktor Space Lab	Low Earth (SSO)	Technology demonstration	In orbit	Operational
30 June; 19:31	Dedicated SmallSat Rideshare mission to sun-synchronous orbit. QMR-KWT will be Kuwait's first satellite. This launch will also carry LaserCube, Nebula and Worldfloods as hosted payloads in the ION SCV-3 deployer and TagSat-2 as hosted payload in the SHERPA-FX2 deployer. The two LINCS satellites entered an uncontrollable tumble after deployment due to "an issue with the launch vehicle".					
← Jan; Feb; Mar; Apr; May; Jun; Jul; Aug; Sep; Oct; Nov; Dec →
For flights after 30 June, see 2021 in spaceflight (July–December)

== Suborbital flights ==
Date and time (UTC)	Rocket	Flight number	Launch site		LSP	
Date and time (UTC)	Payload (⚀ = CubeSat)	Operator	Orbit	Function	Decay (UTC)	Outcome
Date and time (UTC)	Remarks					
14 January; 17:17	(United States) New Shepard	NS-14	(United States) Corn Ranch		(United States) Blue Origin	
14 January; 17:17	(United States) Crew Capsule "RSS First Step"	Blue Origin	Suborbital	Flight test	14 January; 17:27	Successful
14 January; 17:17	(Brazil) (Bulgaria) (British Antarctic Territory) (Canada) (France) (Israel) (Japan) (Malaysia) (Mexico) (Norway) (Russia) (Principality of Sealand) (Spain) (United Kingdom) (United States) Postcards × 50,000	Club For The Future	Suborbital	Education	14 January; 17:27	Successful
14 January; 17:17	Apogee: 106.93 kilometres (66.44 mi). First flight of booster NS4 and crew capsule "RSS First Step". A BAT's postcard was the first payload from British Antarctic Territory to be sent into space.					
15 January	(Iran) Dezful/Zolfaghar		(Iran)		(Iran) IRGC	
15 January	(Iran) Live warhead	IRGC	Suborbital	Missile test	15 January	Successful
15 January	Rapid launch of thirteen Dezful/Zolfaghar ballistic missiles with active warheads (1 of 13).					
15 January	(Iran) Dezful/Zolfaghar		(Iran)		(Iran) IRGC	
15 January	(Iran) Live warhead	IRGC	Suborbital	Missile test	15 January	Successful
15 January	Rapid launch of thirteen Dezful/Zolfaghar ballistic missiles with active warheads (2 of 13).					
15 January	(Iran) Dezful/Zolfaghar		(Iran)		(Iran) IRGC	
15 January	(Iran) Live warhead	IRGC	Suborbital	Missile test	15 January	Successful
15 January	Rapid launch of thirteen Dezful/Zolfaghar ballistic missiles with active warheads (3 of 13).					
15 January	(Iran) Dezful/Zolfaghar		(Iran)		(Iran) IRGC	
15 January	(Iran) Live warhead	IRGC	Suborbital	Missile test	15 January	Successful
15 January	Rapid launch of thirteen Dezful/Zolfaghar ballistic missiles with active warheads (4 of 13).					
15 January	(Iran) Dezful/Zolfaghar		(Iran)		(Iran) IRGC	
15 January	(Iran) Live warhead	IRGC	Suborbital	Missile test	15 January	Successful
15 January	Rapid launch of thirteen Dezful/Zolfaghar ballistic missiles with active warheads (5 of 13).					
15 January	(Iran) Dezful/Zolfaghar		(Iran)		(Iran) IRGC	
15 January	(Iran) Live warhead	IRGC	Suborbital	Missile test	15 January	Successful
15 January	Rapid launch of thirteen Dezful/Zolfaghar ballistic missiles with active warheads (6 of 13).					
15 January	(Iran) Dezful/Zolfaghar		(Iran)		(Iran) IRGC	
15 January	(Iran) Live warhead	IRGC	Suborbital	Missile test	15 January	Successful
15 January	Rapid launch of thirteen Dezful/Zolfaghar ballistic missiles with active warheads (7 of 13).					
15 January	(Iran) Dezful/Zolfaghar		(Iran)		(Iran) IRGC	
15 January	(Iran) Live warhead	IRGC	Suborbital	Missile test	15 January	Successful
15 January	Rapid launch of thirteen Dezful/Zolfaghar ballistic missiles with active warheads (8 of 13).					
15 January	(Iran) Dezful/Zolfaghar		(Iran)		(Iran) IRGC	
15 January	(Iran) Live warhead	IRGC	Suborbital	Missile test	15 January	Successful
15 January	Rapid launch of thirteen Dezful/Zolfaghar ballistic missiles with active warheads (9 of 13).					
15 January	(Iran) Dezful/Zolfaghar		(Iran)		(Iran) IRGC	
15 January	(Iran) Live warhead	IRGC	Suborbital	Missile test	15 January	Successful
15 January	Rapid launch of thirteen Dezful/Zolfaghar ballistic missiles with active warheads (10 of 13).					
15 January	(Iran) Dezful/Zolfaghar		(Iran)		(Iran) IRGC	
15 January	(Iran) Live warhead	IRGC	Suborbital	Missile test	15 January	Successful
15 January	Rapid launch of thirteen Dezful/Zolfaghar ballistic missiles with active warheads (11 of 13).					
15 January	(Iran) Dezful/Zolfaghar		(Iran)		(Iran) IRGC	
15 January	(Iran) Live warhead	IRGC	Suborbital	Missile test	15 January	Successful
15 January	Rapid launch of thirteen Dezful/Zolfaghar ballistic missiles with active warheads (12 of 13).					
15 January	(Iran) Dezful/Zolfaghar		(Iran)		(Iran) IRGC	
15 January	(Iran) Live warhead	IRGC	Suborbital	Missile test	15 January	Successful
15 January	Rapid launch of thirteen Dezful/Zolfaghar ballistic missiles with active warheads (13 of 13).					
16 January	(Iran) Sejil-2		(Iran)		(Iran)	
16 January	(Iran) Re-entry vehicle		Suborbital	Missile test	16 January	Successful
16 January	Launch of a Sejjil missile at a simulated target in the Indian Ocean (1 of 3).					
16 January	(Iran) Sejil-2		(Iran)		(Iran)	
16 January	(Iran) Re-entry vehicle		Suborbital	Missile test	16 January	Successful
16 January	Launch of a Sejjil missile at a simulated target in the Indian Ocean (2 of 3).					
16 January	(Iran) Sejil-2		(Iran)		(Iran)	
16 January	(Iran) Re-entry vehicle		Suborbital	Missile test	16 January	Successful
16 January	Launch of a Sejjil missile at a simulated target in the Indian Ocean (3 of 3).					
16 January	(Iran) Emad		(Iran)		(Iran)	
16 January	(Iran) Re-entry vehicle		Suborbital	Missile test	16 January	Successful
16 January	Launch of an Emad missile at a simulated target in the Indian Ocean (1 of 2).					
16 January	(Iran) Emad		(Iran)		(Iran)	
16 January	(Iran) Re-entry vehicle		Suborbital	Missile test	16 January	Successful
16 January	Launch of an Emad missile at a simulated target in the Indian Ocean (2 of 2).					
16 January	(Iran) Ghadr-110		(Iran)		(Iran)	
16 January	(Iran) Re-entry vehicle		Suborbital	Missile test	16 January	Successful
16 January	Launch of a Ghadr missile at a simulated target in the Indian Ocean.					
20 January	(Pakistan) Shaheen-III		(Pakistan)		(Pakistan)	
20 January	(Pakistan)		Suborbital	Missile test	20 January	Successful
20 January	Shaheen-III missile test.					
31 January	(Iran) Zuljanah		(Iran) Semnan CLP		(Iran) ISA	
31 January	(Iran) Instrumented dummy satellite		Suborbital	Flight test	31 January	Successful
31 January	Suborbital test launch of the Zuljanah satellite launch vehicle. Apogee 500km.					
3 February	(Pakistan) Ghaznavi		(Pakistan)		(Pakistan) ASFC	
3 February	(Pakistan)	ASFC	Suborbital	Missile test	3 February	Successful
4 February	(China) B-611		(China) Taiyuan		(China) PLA	
4 February		PLA	Suborbital	ABM target	4 February	Successful
4 February	Interceptor target					
4 February	(China) SC-19		(China)		(China) PLA	
4 February		PLA	Suborbital	ABM test	4 February	Successful
4 February	Interceptor, successful intercept.					
5 February; 09:05	(China) OS-X6B		(China)		(China) OneSpace	
5 February; 09:05	Experimental payload	OneSpace	Suborbital	Technology demonstration	5 February	Successful
5 February; 09:05	Maiden flight of suborbital rocket OS-X6B. Apogee at 300 km (190 mi).					
9 February	(United States) UGM-133 Trident II		(United States) USS West Virginia (SSBN 736)		(United States) U.S. Navy	
9 February	(United States)	U.S. Navy	Suborbital	Missile test	9 February	Successful
9 February	1 of 4.					
10 February	(United States) UGM-133 Trident II		(United States) USS West Virginia (SSBN 736)		(United States) U.S. Navy	
10 February	(United States)	U.S. Navy	Suborbital	Missile test	10 February	Successful
10 February	2 of 4.					
11 February	(United States) UGM-133 Trident II		(United States) USS West Virginia (SSBN 736)		(United States) U.S. Navy	
11 February	(United States)	U.S. Navy	Suborbital	Missile test	11 February	Successful
11 February	3 of 4.					
11 February	(United States) UGM-133 Trident II		(United States) USS West Virginia (SSBN 736)		(United States) U.S. Navy	
11 February	(United States)	U.S. Navy	Suborbital	Missile test	11 February	Successful
11 February	4 of 4.					
24 February; 07:49	(United States) Minuteman-III		(United States) Vandenberg Air Force Base		(United States) U.S. Air Force	
24 February; 07:49	(United States) Test reentry vehicle	U.S. Air Force	Suborbital	Test flight	24 February	Successful
27 February	(Yemen) Zulfiqar		(Yemen)		(Yemen) Houthis	
27 February	(Yemen) Live warhead	Houthis	Suborbital	Missile launch	27 February	Warhead intercepted
27 February	Successful launch. Warhead was intercepted.					
3 March	(United States) Terrier-Terrier-Oriole		(United States) Wallops Flight Facility		(United States) Space Vector	
3 March	(United States) TBA	US Department of Defense	Suborbital	Space ionization	3 March	Successful
7 March	(Yemen) Zulfiqar		(Yemen)		(Yemen) Houthis	
7 March	(Yemen) Live warhead	Houthis	Suborbital	Missile launch	7 March	Successful
12 March; 13:30	(India) RH-560 Mk.III		(India) Satish Dhawan Space Centre		(India) ISRO	
12 March; 13:30	(India) TMA	ISRO	Suborbital	Vapor release	12 March	Successful
12 March; 13:30	First launch of the RH-560 Mk.III					
26 March	(Yemen) Zulfiqar		(Yemen)		(Yemen) Houthis	
26 March	(Yemen) Live warhead	Houthis	Suborbital	Missile launch	26 March	Successful
26 March	(Pakistan) Shaheen 1-A		(Pakistan)		(Pakistan) ASFC	
26 March	(Pakistan)	ASFC	Suborbital	Missile test	26 March	Successful
14 April; 16:51	(United States) New Shepard	NS-15	(United States) Corn Ranch		(United States) Blue Origin	
14 April; 16:51	(United States) Crew Capsule "RSS First Step"	Blue Origin	Suborbital	Flight test	14 April; 17:01	Successful
14 April; 16:51	(Australia) (Belgium) (Bulgaria) (France) (Germany) (India) (Italy) (Japan) (Netherlands) (Slovakia) (Switzerland) (United Arab Emirates) (United States) Postcards × 25,000	Club For The Future	Suborbital	Education	14 April; 17:01	Successful
14 April; 16:51	Apogee: 106.30 kilometres (66.05 mi). Second flight of booster NS4 and crew capsule "RSS First Step" that included Astronaut Rehearsal.					
19 April; 08:30	(Canada) Black Brant IX	SHIELDS	(United States) White Sands Missile Range		(United States) NASA	
19 April; 08:30	(United States) SHIELDS	University of Arizona	Suborbital	Space telescope	19 April	Successful
19 April; 08:30	Apogee: 284.8 km (177 mi).					
23 April; 11:40	(Taiwan) Sky Bow III		(Taiwan) Jiupeng Air Force Base		(Taiwan) NCSIST	
23 April; 11:40	(Taiwan)	NCSIST	Suborbital	Missile test	23 April	Successful
23 April; 11:40	Vertical test flight. Apogee: >80 km (50 mi).					
26 April	(Russia) 53T6M		(Kazakhstan) Sary-Shagan		(Russia)	
26 April	(Russia)		Suborbital	ABM test flight	26 April	Successful
28 April	(France) M51		(France) Biscarrosse		(France)	
28 April	(France) Re-entry vehicle	French Navy	Suborbital	Missile test	28 April	Successful
1 May ≈18:00	(United States)		(United States) Spaceport America		United States Military Academy	
1 May ≈18:00	(United States)	United States Military Academy	Suborbital	Amateur rocket	1 May	Successful
1 May ≈18:00	Apogee: 84 km (52 mi).					
17 May; 00:44	(Canada) Black Brant XII-A	KiNET-X 2	(United States) Wallops Flight Facility		(United States) NASA	
17 May; 00:44	(United States) KiNET-X 2	University of Alaska Fairbanks	Suborbital	Plasma science	17 May	Successful
18 May; 17:30	(Canada) Black Brant IX	EUNIS	(United States) White Sands Missile Range		(United States) NASA	
18 May; 17:30	(United States) Extreme Ultraviolet Normal-Incidence Spectrograph	Goddard Space Flight Center	Suborbital	Solar observation	18 May	Successful
18 May; 17:30	Apogee: 335.4 km (208.4 mi).					
22 May; 15:26	(United States) SpaceShipTwo	VF-03	(United States) Spaceport America		(United States) Virgin Galactic	
22 May; 15:26	(United States) VSS Unity	Virgin Galactic	Suborbital	Crewed spaceflight	22 May; 15:43	Successful
22 May; 15:26	First human spaceflight launched from New Mexico. Apogee: 89.23 km (55.45 mi).					
24 May; 05:35	(United States) Improved Malemute/Improved Malemute	MAPHEUS 11	(Sweden) Esrange		(Germany) DLR	
24 May; 05:35	(Germany) MAPHEUS 11	DLR	Suborbital	Microgravity research	24 May; 05:50	Successful
24 May; 05:35	First launch of the Improved Malemute/Improved Malemute. Apogee: 221 km (137 mi).					
26 May	(United States) Terrier-Oriole T4-B	FS-21 E3a	(United Kingdom) Deep Sea Range			
26 May			Suborbital	Target missile	26 May	Successful
26 May	Intercepted by an SM-3 missile.					
26 May	(United States) SM-3	FS-21 E3a	(United States) USS Paul Ignatius		(United States) U.S. Navy	
26 May	(United States) Kill vehicle	U.S. Navy	Suborbital	ABM test	26 May	Successful
26 May	Intercepted a target ballistic missile in space.					
27 May; 01:15	(United States) Terrier-Improved Malemute	VIPER	(United States) Wallops Flight Facility		(United States) NASA	
27 May; 01:15	(United States) VIPER	University of Berkeley	Suborbital	Ionospheric propagation	27 May	Successful
29 May	(United States) MRBM T3c2	FTM-31 E1	(Marshall Islands) Ronald Reagan Ballistic Missile Defense Test Site		(United States) MDA	
29 May	(United States) SM-6 target	MDA	Suborbital	ABM target	29 May	Successful
29 May	Flight Test Aegis Weapon System 31 Event 1, a test of the Aegis Ballistic Missile Defense System. MRBM target for two SM-6 Dual II missiles. Was not intercepted.					
29 May	(United States) SM-6 Dual II	FTM-31 E1	(United States) Unnamed U.S. naval vessel		(United States) MDA / U.S. Navy	
29 May	(United States) Kill vehicle	U.S. Navy	Suborbital	ABM test	29 May	Successful launch; intercept failure
29 May	Flight Test Aegis Weapon System 31 Event 1, a test of the Aegis Ballistic Missile Defense System. Launch of two SM-6 Dual II missiles. Successfully launched; vehicle failed to intercept target.					
29 May	(United States) SM-6 Dual II	FTM-31 E1	(United States) Unnamed U.S. naval vessel		(United States) MDA / U.S. Navy	
29 May	(United States) Kill vehicle	U.S. Navy	Suborbital	ABM test	29 May	Successful launch; intercept failure
29 May	Flight Test Aegis Weapon System 31 Event 1, a test of the Aegis Ballistic Missile Defense System. Launch of two SM-6 Dual II missiles. Successfully launched; vehicle failed to intercept target.					
30 May	(United States) Terrier-Oriole T4-B	FS-21 E6a	(United Kingdom) Deep Sea Range			
30 May			Suborbital	Target missile	30 May	Successful
30 May	Intercepted by an SM-3 missile.					
30 May	(United States) SM-3	FS-21 E6a	(United States) USS Paul Ignatius		(United States) U.S. Navy	
30 May	(United States) Kill vehicle	U.S. Navy	Suborbital	ABM test	30 May	Successful
30 May	Intercepted a target ballistic missile in space.					
7 June; 06:25	(Canada) Black Brant IX	CIBER 2	(United States) White Sands Missile Range		(United States) NASA	
7 June; 06:25	(United States) CIBER 2	Rochester Institute of Technology	Suborbital	EBL anisotropy	7 June	Successful
7 June; 06:25	Apogee: 311 km (193 mi).					
Mid-June	(Russia) Kedr		(Russia) Plesetsk		(Russia) RVSN RF	
Mid-June	(Russia)	RVSN RF	Suborbital	Missile test	June	Successful
Mid-June	Test flight of the Kedr ICBM, which is expected to replace the RS-24 Yars around 2030.					
23 June; 00:50:00	(Brazil) VSB-30 (S31/Improved Orion)	BOLT	(Sweden) Esrange		(Germany) DLR	
23 June; 00:50:00	(Germany) (United States) BOLT-1	DLR	Suborbital	Hypersonic test flight	23 June; 01:05:37	Successful
23 June; 00:50:00	Boundary Layer Transition (BOLT) Flight Experiment, with a nominal apogee of 281 km (175 mi).					
25 June; 12:32	(United States) Terrier-Improved Orion	RockOn!	(United States) Wallops Flight Facility		(United States) NASA	
25 June; 12:32	(United States) RockOn/RockSat-C	Colorado Space Grant Consortium	Suborbital	Education	25 June	Successful
25 June; 12:32	Apogee: 116 km (72 mi).					
28 June; 05:25	(India) Agni-P		(India) Integrated Test Range		(India) DRDO	
28 June; 05:25	(India)	DRDO	Suborbital	Missile test	28 June	Successful
