= OPUSAT =

Japanese technology demonstration CubeSat

- Mission type: Technology
- Operator: Osaka Prefecture University
- COSPAR ID: 2014-009D
- SATCAT no.: 39575
- Website: www.sssrc.aero.osakafu-u.ac.jp/E_SSSRC_HP/projects/OPUSAT/home.html

Spacecraft properties
- Spacecraft type: 1U CubeSat
- Manufacturer: Osaka Prefecture University
- Launch mass: 1.4 kilograms (3.1 lb)

Start of mission
- Launch date: 27 February 2014, 18:37 UTC
- Rocket: H-IIA 202
- Launch site: Tanegashima Yoshinobu 1
- Contractor: Mitsubishi

End of mission
- Decay date: 24 July 2014

Orbital parameters
- Reference system: Geocentric
- Regime: Low Earth
- Perigee altitude: 383 kilometres (238 mi)
- Apogee altitude: 389 kilometres (242 mi)
- Inclination: 65 degrees
- Period: 92.27 minutes
- Epoch: 28 February 2014

The Osaka Prefecture University Satellite, or OPUSAT was a technology demonstration cubesat built and operated by Japan's Osaka Prefecture University. It had a size of 100x100x100mm (without antennas and solar paddles) and build around a standard 1U cubesat bus. The primary satellite purpose was the space testing of the power system based on a Lithium-ion capacitor. The tests were largely successful, and it finished operation by reentry to Earth atmosphere on 24 July 2014. The OPUSAT was a development successor to “Maido Ichigo” satellite by East Osaka Craftmen Astro-Technology SOHLA in Osaka.

== See also ==
- List of CubeSats
- OPUSAT-II
