= WARP-01 =

Japanese Cube Satellite

- Mission type: Technology demonstration
- Operator: Warpspace
- COSPAR ID: 1998-067SA
- SATCAT no.: 47924

Spacecraft properties
- Spacecraft type: CubeSat

Start of mission
- Launch date: 20 February 2021, 17:36:50 UTC
- Rocket: Antares 230+
- Launch site: MARS, Pad 0A
- Deployed from: ISS Kibō; Delivered by Cygnus NG-15
- Deployment date: 14 March 2021

End of mission
- Decay date: 1 May 2022

Orbital parameters
- Reference system: Geocentric
- Regime: Low Earth
- Inclination: 51.6°

WARP-01, nicknamed Nichirin, was a 1U-sized CubeSat developed and operated by Warpspace, a newspace company based in Tsukuba, Japan. It was launched on 20 February 2021 on board a Cygnus cargo spacecraft, and deployed from the International Space Station (ISS) on 14 March 2021. WARP-01 was used for technology validation and monitoring the radio wave and radiation environment in space.

== Overview ==
WARP-01 was Warpspace's first satellite. The company signed a contract to deploy a satellite from the ISS's Kibo Module with Space BD on 24 August 2018. Inside the satellite were several wedding memorial plaques, which were sent to space as part of a 'space bridal service'. At the time the service was first announced in July 2018, media reports said that astronauts staying on the ISS were to take photographs of the satellite during its deployment. WARP-01 was unveiled during an event in Tsukuba city in February 2020. WARP-01 was launched and carried to space on board Cygnus NG-15. WARP-01 tested a radiation sensor, which was used to monitor the radiation environment in low Earth orbit.

WARP-01 decayed from orbit on 1 May 2022.

== See also ==
- OPUSAT-II
- RSP-01
- STARS-EC
