= STARS-II =

- Mission type: Technology
- Operator: Kagawa University
- COSPAR ID: 2014-009H
- SATCAT no.: 39579
- Website: stars.eng.shizuoka.ac.jp/english.html
- Mission duration: 2 months

Spacecraft properties
- Manufacturer: Kagawa University
- Launch mass: 9 kilograms (20 lb)

Start of mission
- Launch date: 27 February 2014, 18:37 UTC
- Rocket: H-IIA 202
- Launch site: Tanegashima Yoshinobu 1
- Contractor: Mitsubishi

End of mission
- Decay date: 26 April 2014

Orbital parameters
- Reference system: Geocentric
- Regime: Low Earth
- Semi-major axis: 6,745.00 kilometres (4,191.15 mi)
- Eccentricity: 0.00103780
- Perigee altitude: 367 kilometres (228 mi)
- Apogee altitude: 381 kilometres (237 mi)
- Inclination: 65 degrees
- Period: 92.02 minutes
- Epoch: 28 February 2014

Space Tethered Autonomous Robotic Satellite II or STARS-II, was a nanosatellite built by Japan's Kagawa University to test an electrodynamic tether in low Earth orbit, a follow-on to the STARS mission.

STARS-II was launched by an H-IIA rocket, flying in the 202 configuration, as a secondary payload aboard the launch of the GPM Core Observatory on 27 February 2014. After two months in orbit, STARS-II reentered the atmosphere on 26 April 2014.

== Flight Plan ==
The satellite split into two parts, connected by a 300-metre (980 ft) tether, to conduct its experiments which consisted of recording a video of tether deployment and using the tether to deorbit the satellite. The spacecraft consisted of a 5-kilogram (11 lb) base vehicle, with dimensions of 160 by 160 by 253 millimetres (6.3 in × 6.3 in × 10.0 in) and a 4-kilogram (8.8 lb) vehicle at the end of the tether measuring 160 by 160 by 158 millimetres (6.3 in × 6.3 in × 6.2 in). The electrodynamic tether was made from ultra-thin wires of stainless steel and aluminium.

One objective of this program was to demonstrate possible technology for de-orbiting space debris.

== Results ==
STARS-II was successfully launched at 3:37am (JST) on 28 February 2014 (27 February UTC), and amateur radio downlink showed that it successfully separated from the carrier vehicle, however, the experiment was only partially successful, and tether deployment could not be confirmed.

Initial radio data suggested that the solar arrays and antennas were not deployed. The beacon from the daughter spacecraft became weak, and after several weeks was no longer received. It was inferred that solar battery power was low due to its small body. However, the beacon from the mother spacecraft later became strong, and it was inferred that the solar arrays and antennas were deployed by restarting. However, the Command and Data Handling subsystem did not work, possibly due to radiation.

The orbit decayed from 350 km to 280 km in 50 days, considerably faster than the other cubesats launched on the same mission, which is indirect indication that the tether deployed, increasing the drag. However, telescopic photography of the satellite from the ground showed the satellite as a single point, rather than two objects. The experimenters suggest that this may have been due to the tether extending, but being tangled by rebound.

== Follow-on ==
A follow-on to the STARS and STARS-II satellites, STARS-C (Space Tethered Autonomous Robotic Satellite-Cube, COSPAR 1998-067KR, SATCAT 41895) was announced as a satellite to be launched from the Japanese Experiment Module of the International Space Station.

STARS-C was a 2U cubesat consisting of a mother satellite and a daughter satellite, designed to deploy a 100-m aramid fiber tether. It was launched on 9 December 2016, from J-SSOD and re-entered on 3 March 2018. However, the signal quality was intermittent, possibly due to failure of deployment of the solar panel, and data on tether deployment was not obtained. Estimates from orbital drag measurements suggest that the tether deployed to a length of about 30 meters.

Also other Japanese STARS satellites have been launched, like STARS-ME, Stars-AO and STARS-EC.

== See also ==
- Tether satellite
- Space tether missions
- STARS-EC
- STS-75
