= STARS-EC =

Nanosatellite

STARS-EC (Space Tethered Autonomous Robotic Satellite Elevator of CubeSat, COSPAR 1998-067SE, SATCAT 47928) was a nanosatellite developed by Shizuoka University, for the purpose of demonstrating space elevator tether technology. It was a 3U-size CubeSat, and could split into three separate satellites, connected via tethers. STARS-EC was launched on 20 February 2021, and was deployed from the International Space Station (ISS). The deployment service of STARS-EC was provided by Mitsui Bussan Aerospace. The satellite decayed from orbit on 15 April 2022.

== History ==
STARS-EC was deployed from the Japanese Experiment Module Kibō on 14 March 2021, in a batch of eight CubeSats that also included OPUSAT-II, the three BIRDS-4 satellites (GuaraniSat-1, Maya-2 and Tsuru), RSP-01, WARP-01 and TAUSAT-1. It was the fourth deployment of that round, and JAXA lists its developers as Shizuoka University and STARS Space Service Inc. The mission was described as analysing the behaviour of a mini orbital elevator, using a 3U CubeSat made of three 1U units connected by a tether.

The project grew out of a larger concept. Research funded by a Japanese grant from 2015 to 2019 first developed a satellite able to deploy a tether of more than 1 km, and ground experiments and numerical simulation confirmed that its mission was feasible. However, space debris concerns made a 1 km tether deployment difficult, so the team developed a CubeSat that minimised the scale of tether deployment.

== Mission ==
STARS-EC's mission was to demonstrate space elevator tether technology using a 3U CubeSat. After deployment from the ISS, the satellite split into three separate spacecraft, each the size of a 1U CubeSat. The spacecraft on each end was connected to the center satellite by an 11 m-long (36 ft) space tether, thus putting the satellites on the ends 22 m apart from one another. The satellite in the center moved back and forth along the tether, demonstrating the orbital space elevator technology. Each spacecraft was equipped with a camera to monitor the elevator demonstration.

== See also ==
- STARS
- STARS-II
- STARS-C
- OPUSAT-II
- RSP-01
- WARP-01
