= RSP-01 =

- Mission type: Technology demonstration
- Operator: Ryman Sat Project
- COSPAR ID: 1998-067SB
- SATCAT no.: 47925
- Website: www.rsp01.rymansat.com

Spacecraft properties
- Spacecraft type: CubeSat

Start of mission
- Launch date: 20 February 2021, 17:36:50 UTC
- Rocket: Antares 230+
- Launch site: MARS, Pad 0A
- Deployed from: ISS Kibō; Delivered by Cygnus NG-15
- Deployment date: 14 March 2021

End of mission
- Decay date: 10 June 2022

Orbital parameters
- Reference system: Geocentric
- Regime: Low Earth
- Inclination: 51.6°

RSP-01, nicknamed Selfie-sh was a nanosatellite developed by Ryman Sat Project. RSP-01 launched from Wallops Flight Facility on board a Cygnus spacecraft on 20 February 2021.

The satellite decayed from orbit on 10 June 2022.

== Overview ==
RSP-01 was Ryman Sat Project's second satellite. It was a 1U CubeSat weighing around 1.3 kg, and was equipped with an arm that could extend up to 10 cm. The CubeSat had three transceivers. The on board computer used Arduino and Raspberry Pi.

The project began in 2017, and development was completed by 2020. Part of the development cost was covered by a crowdfunding campaign in 2019. The RSP-01 project was led by Ryuichi Mitsui and Shuichi Ito.

== Mission ==
RSP-01's main mission was to extend an arm carrying a camera, and photograph RSP-01 with the Earth in the background, taking selfies. The arm had a pantograph design to allow contraction after being extended.

Additionally, RSP-01 conducted image recognition by machine learning, and also had a chat function. The CubeSat used its reaction wheel to demonstrate attitude control.

== See also ==
- Space selfie
- OPUSAT-II
- STARS-EC
- WARP-01
