= MMSAT-1 =

Myanmar's first microsatellite

MMSAT-1 (Lawkanat-1)
- Mission type: Earth Observation
- Operator: Myanmar MAEU / Japan Hokkaido University
- COSPAR ID: 1998-067SJ
- SATCAT no.: 47976
- Mission duration: 2 years, 1 month and 14 days (final)

Spacecraft properties
- Bus: Cygnus NG-15
- Manufacturer: Japan Hokkaido University / Myanmar MAEU
- BOL mass: 50 kilograms (110 lb)
- Dimensions: 50 × 50 × 50 cm

Start of mission
- Launch date: 17:36:50, February 20, 2021
- Rocket: (United States) Antares 230+
- Launch site: (United States) MARS LP-0A
- Deployed from: ISS
- Deployment date: 22 March 2021

End of mission
- Decay date: 4 April 2023

Orbital parameters
- Reference system: Geocentric
- Regime: Low Earth
- Perigee altitude: 416 km
- Apogee altitude: 421 km
- Inclination: 51.6°

MMSAT-1 (also known as Lawkanat-1) was a Burmese microsatellite launched to the International Space Station (ISS) on 20 February 2021 and deployed into orbit from the ISS on 22 March 2021. It was Myanmar's first microsatellite and jointly built by Japan's Hokkaido University and Myanmar Aerospace Engineering University. It was delivered to the ISS by the American cargo spacecraft Cygnus NG-15. MMSAT-1 was temporarily held on ISS and its deployment was delayed due to the 2021 Myanmar coup d'état. It was deployed into orbit on 22 March 2021.

MMSAT-1 was intended to be used not only for environmental observation and mineral exploration, but also for natural disaster control, but human rights activists worried that the satellite could be used for military purposes. According to Hokkaido University, as Myanmar did not yet have the necessary equipment, the satellite would initially be operated from Japan.

MMSAT-1 reentered the atmosphere on 4 April 2023.
