= Cosmic Infrared Background ExpeRiment =

CIBER
General Informations
- Organization: NASA Jet Propulsion Laboratory/Caltech
- Mission Type: Sounding rocket
- Launch: 2009, 2010, 2012, 2013, 2021
- Wavelength: Infrared
- Website: CIBER Home Page

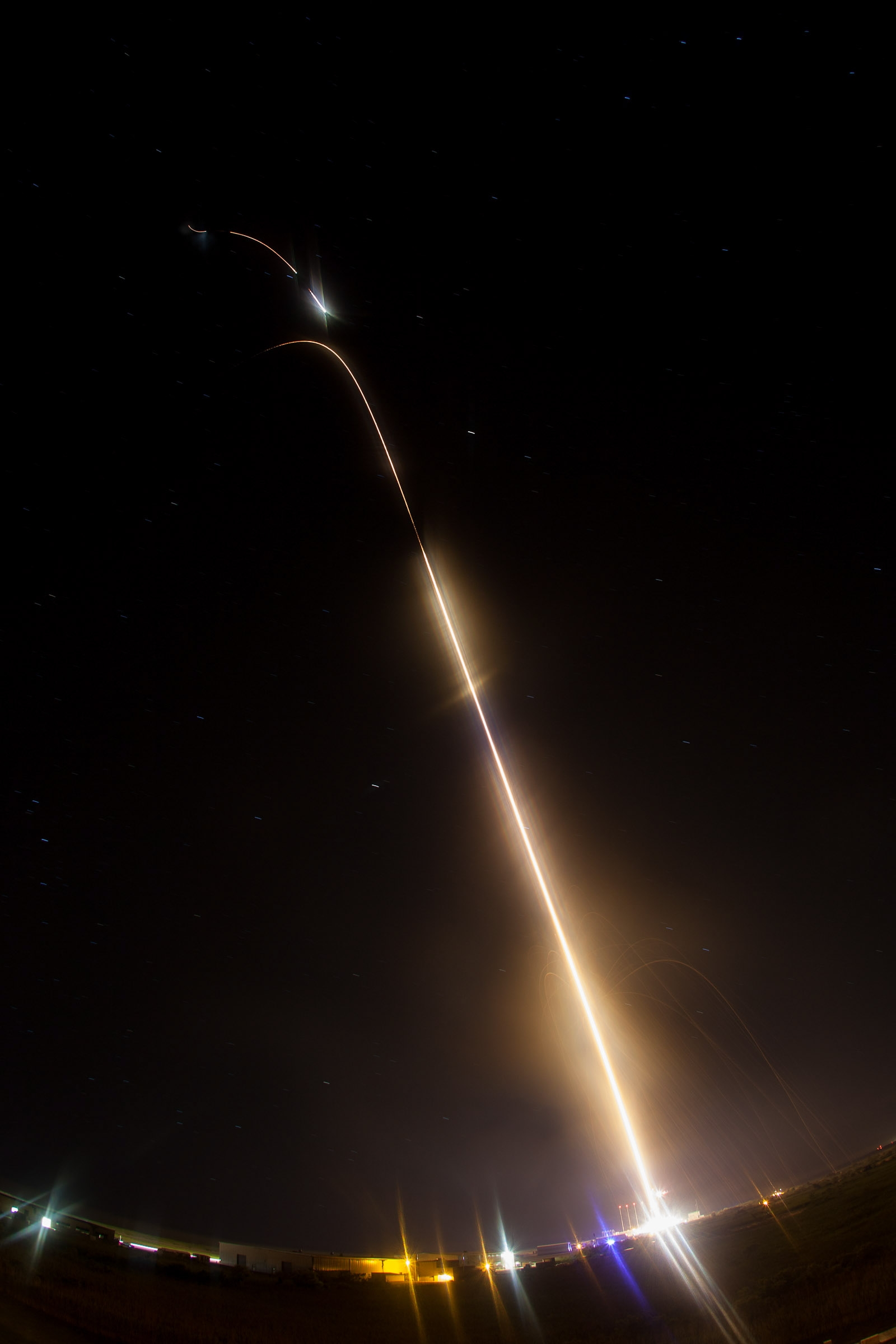
A NASA Black Brant XII suborbital rocket following its launch on June 5, 2013 from the Wallops Flight Facility in Virginia carrying the Cosmic Infrared Background ExpeRiment (CIBER) to an altitude of approximately 358 miles above the Atlantic Ocean.

The Cosmic Infrared Background ExpeRiment (CIBER) was a payload flown aboard Black Brant XII sounding rockets to collect data about cosmic infrared background. In 2014 results from CIBER indicated an excess of infrared light, beyond what is emitted by galaxies.

After the conclusion of the CIBER mission, the research into cosmic infrared background is being (as of 2021) pursued by a follow-on mission, CIBER-2. CIBER-2 is a successor to CIBER using similar techniques (with improvements, naturally) and also launching into suborbital space aboard a sounding rocket. CIBER-2 was first launched on 7 June 2021 aboard a Black Brant IX rocket. A second CIBER-2 flight was attempted on 16 April 2023, but no science was collected due to a launch failure shortly after takeoff. The third CIBER-2 flight is scheduled to take place on 5 May 2024.
