= OQ Technology =

Luxembourg satellite telecommunications company

- Type: Private
- Industry: Satellite communications; Non-terrestrial networks; Internet of Things
- Founded: 2016
- Founder: Omar Qaise
- Headquarters: Luxembourg
- Area served: International
- Key people: Omar Qaise (Founder and CEO)
- Products: Satellite IoT connectivity, user terminals, satellite communications infrastructure
- Website: https://www.oqtec.com

OQ Technology is a Luxembourg-based satellite telecommunications company founded in 2016 by Omar Qaise. The company develops satellite-based Internet of Things (IoT) connectivity solutions using low Earth orbit (LEO) satellites and standardized cellular communication protocols, including narrowband IoT (NB-IoT) and 5G non-terrestrial networks (NTN).

The company develops and operates satellite communications infrastructure intended to extend connectivity to areas with limited terrestrial mobile network coverage. Its activities include satellite IoT services, machine-to-machine (M2M) communication, and research into direct-to-device (D2D) satellite connectivity for conventional mobile phones.

Headquartered in Luxembourg, OQ Technology has expanded its activities to markets in Europe, the Middle East, Africa and Australia. Its satellite communication services are intended for applications in sectors including energy, logistics, maritime operations, agriculture and infrastructure monitoring.

== History ==
=== Foundation and early development (2016–2020) ===
OQ Technology was established in Luxembourg in 2016 by telecommunications engineer Omar Qaise. The company was founded to develop satellite-based cellular connectivity using standardized communication protocols, with an initial focus on industrial IoT applications.

In 2018, the company participated in a satellite IoT demonstration project alongside EmTroniX and GomSpace, supported through Luxembourg's space programme and the European Space Agency (ESA). The project explored the feasibility of connecting IoT devices through satellite communication systems.

The company's early development included satellite demonstration activities aimed at testing cellular IoT communication between orbiting satellites and terrestrial devices.

=== Satellite network development (2021–2024) ===
During the early 2020s, OQ Technology continued developing satellite communication systems based on cellular IoT standards. Its activities included the development of satellite payloads, ground infrastructure, user terminals and satellite communication services.

In 2022, the company completed a Series A financing round of approximately €13 million to support the development and expansion of its satellite network.

In March 2023, OQ Technology received a space activity licence from the government of Luxembourg, enabling it to conduct licensed space activities under the country's regulatory framework.

In 2023, Telecom Review published an interview with the company's founder discussing its satellite IoT business model, including applications in industrial monitoring and its activities in the energy and telecommunications sectors.

In October 2024, OQ Technology announced additional convertible financing as part of its Series B fundraising activities. The investors identified in coverage included the Luxembourg Space Sector Development Fund, Wa'ed Ventures and Phaistos Investment Fund.

=== Expansion and satellite development (2025–2026) ===
In 2025, OQ Technology was selected for support through the European Innovation Council Accelerator programme. The announced funding package included a €2.5 million grant and the possibility of up to €15 million in equity financing, subject to the programme's investment conditions.

During this period, the company expanded its development activities from satellite IoT connectivity toward direct-to-device satellite communications, including emergency messaging applications intended for conventional smartphones.

In June 2026, Via Satellite published an interview examining OQ Technology's direct-to-device strategy, its relationship with terrestrial mobile network operators, and its planned second-generation satellite constellation.

The company's activities also included research into satellite connectivity for unmanned aerial vehicles and potential defence-related applications.

== Operations and technology ==
=== Satellite IoT connectivity ===
OQ Technology develops and operates satellite communications systems using low Earth orbit satellites and standardized cellular protocols. Its primary technology includes narrowband IoT connectivity designed to support data transmission from compatible devices in locations with limited terrestrial network coverage.

The company's approach uses standards developed by the 3rd Generation Partnership Project (3GPP), including specifications for non-terrestrial networks. These standards are intended to facilitate interoperability between terrestrial cellular infrastructure and satellite communication systems.

Satellite IoT applications discussed by the company include asset tracking, pipeline monitoring, industrial equipment monitoring, environmental monitoring and communications for remote infrastructure.

OQ Technology also develops user terminals, associated communications hardware, and software services for connecting and managing satellite IoT devices.

=== Direct-to-device communications ===
In addition to industrial IoT services, OQ Technology has developed technology intended to enable communication between satellites and conventional mobile devices.

Its direct-to-device development activities include satellite-based messaging and emergency communication capabilities, as well as research into the use of terrestrial mobile spectrum for satellite connectivity.

The company has worked with mobile network operators on demonstrations intended to examine the integration of satellite connectivity with existing telecommunications networks. In 2026, OQ Technology discussed plans for direct-to-device demonstrations involving Telefónica Germany.

=== Industrial applications ===
OQ Technology's satellite communications services target industrial sectors where conventional terrestrial networks may be unavailable or unreliable.

Applications include remote monitoring in the oil and gas industry, logistics and maritime asset tracking, agricultural monitoring and environmental data collection.

In a 2023 interview with Telecom Review, the company discussed the use of satellite IoT communication in collaboration with Saudi Aramco, including applications involving remote industrial infrastructure.

The company has also investigated satellite connectivity for unmanned aerial vehicles, including the transmission of data from drones through narrowband satellite links.

== Research and development ==
OQ Technology has participated in research and development projects supported by the European Space Agency and Luxembourg's national space initiatives.

Its early satellite IoT demonstration activities included collaboration with GomSpace and EmTroniX through Luxembourg's space programme.

In April 2026, the Luxembourg Times reported that OQ Technology had received a €1 million ESA contract for the BEAMSAT-5G project.

The project examines the adaptation of terrestrial 5G beamforming technologies for satellite communication systems, including hardware development and validation activities. It forms part of ESA's Advanced Research in Telecommunications Systems (ARTES) programme.

The company's research has also included satellite communications using 5G New Radio technology and investigations into communication links for drones and other remotely operated systems.

== Partnerships and industry participation ==
OQ Technology has participated in satellite telecommunications projects involving industrial partners, research organizations and mobile network operators.

Its early satellite IoT development activities involved collaboration with GomSpace and EmTroniX on projects supported through Luxembourg's space initiatives and ESA.

The company has also engaged with mobile telecommunications operators in developing satellite connectivity applications. In June 2026, Via Satellite reported on its collaboration with Telefónica Germany concerning direct-to-device demonstrations.

OQ Technology's work on satellite communications includes the implementation of technology based on 3GPP standards for non-terrestrial networks.

== Funding ==
OQ Technology has received public and private financing to support its satellite communications development activities.

The company completed a Series A financing round of approximately €13 million in 2022. In 2024, it announced convertible financing associated with its Series B fundraising efforts.

In 2025, OQ Technology was selected for the European Innovation Council Accelerator, with an announced funding package consisting of a €2.5 million grant and potential equity investment of up to €15 million.

== See also ==
- 3GPP
- Non-terrestrial network
- Satellite Internet access
- Internet of things
