= Progress MS-16 =

2021 Russian resupply spaceflight to the ISS

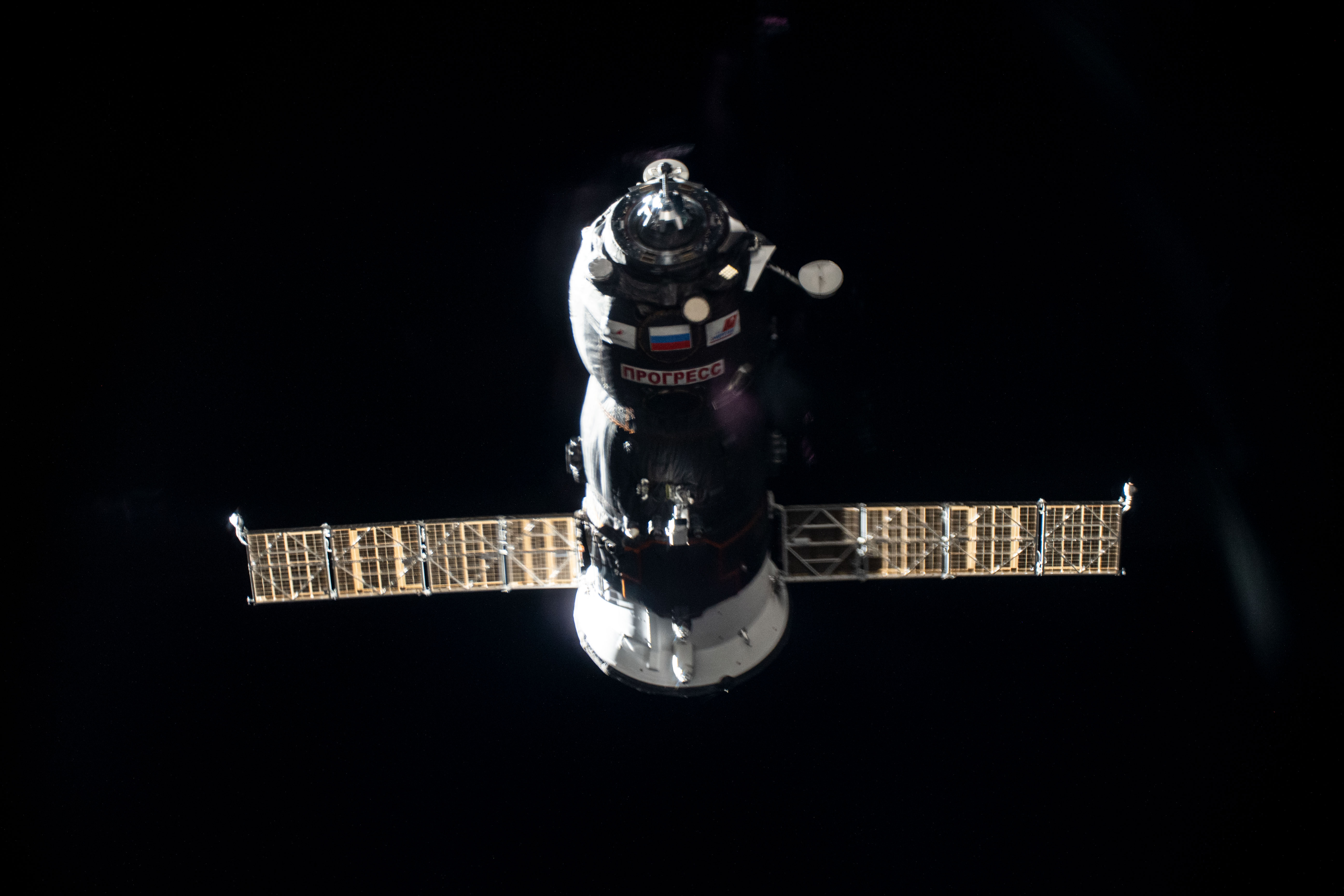
- Progress MS-16 approaches the ISS
- Names: Прогресс МC-16; Progress 77P
- Mission type: ISS resupply
- Operator: Roscosmos
- COSPAR ID: 2021-011A
- SATCAT no.: 47618
- Mission duration: 161 days, 10 hours, 5 minutes

Spacecraft properties
- Spacecraft: Progress MS-16
- Spacecraft type: Progress MS
- Manufacturer: Energia
- Launch mass: 7000 kg
- Payload mass: 2460.5 kg

Start of mission
- Launch date: 15 February 2021, 04:45:06 UTC
- Rocket: Soyuz-2.1a
- Launch site: Baikonur, Site 31/6
- Contractor: RKTs Progress

End of mission
- Disposal: Deorbited
- Decay date: 26 July 2021, 14:51 UTC

Orbital parameters
- Reference system: Geocentric orbit
- Regime: Low Earth orbit
- Inclination: 51.65°

Docking with ISS
- Docking port: Zvezda nadir by Pirs nadir
- Docking date: 17 February 2021, 06:27 UTC
- Undocking date: 26 July 2021, 10:55 UTC
- Time docked: 159 days

Cargo
- Mass: 2460.5 kg
- Pressurised: 1400 kg
- Fuel: 600 kg
- Gaseous: 40.5 kg
- Water: 420 kg

Progress MS-16 (Russian: Прогресс МC-16), Russian production No. 445, identified by NASA as Progress 77P, was a Progress spaceflight operated by Roscosmos to resupply the International Space Station (ISS). This was the 168th flight of a Progress spacecraft.

== History ==
The Progress-MS is an uncrewed freighter based on the Progress-M featuring improved avionics. This improved variant first launched on 21 December 2015. It has the following improvements:

- New external compartment that enables it to deploy satellites. Each compartment can hold up to four launch containers. First time installed on Progress MS-03.
- Enhanced redundancy thanks to the addition of a backup system of electrical motors for the docking and sealing mechanism.
- Improved Micrometeoroid (MMOD) protection with additional panels in the cargo compartment.
- Luch Russian relay satellites link capabilities enable telemetry and control even when not in direct view of ground radio stations.
- GNSS autonomous navigation enables real time determination of the status vector and orbital parameters dispensing with the need of ground station orbit determination.
- Real time relative navigation thanks to direct radio data exchange capabilities with the space station.
- New digital radio that enables enhanced TV camera view for the docking operations.
- The Ukrainian Chezara Kvant-V on board radio system and antenna/feeder system has been replaced with a Unified Command Telemetry System (UCTS).
- Replacement of the Kurs A with Kurs NA digital system.

== Launch ==
A Soyuz-2.1a launched Progress MS-16 to the International Space Station from Baikonur Cosmodrome Site 31 on 15 February 2021 following a two-day, 34-orbit rendezvous profile. Progress MS-16 was docked on 17 February 2021, 06:26:47 UTC, using manual docking system operated by Expedition 64 commander Sergey Ryzhikov to the Pirs module of the ISS, where it remained until 26 July 2021, 10:55 UTC.

== Cargo ==
On 4 February 2021, Roscosmos said that Progress MS-16 had been installed back into its processing stand inside the assembly building at Site 254 for final pre-launch operations and loading of fresh food items in its cargo bay. The ship's cargo included 600 kg of propellant for refueling, 420 kg of drinking water in the Rodnik system, 40.5 kg of pressurized gases with extra nitrogen supplies and 1,400 kg of various equipment and supplies, including the repair kit with reinforced glue patches for temporary sealing of the Transfer Chamber, PrK, in the Zvezda Service Module (SM).

The Progress MS-16 spacecraft was loaded with 2,460.5 kg (5,424 lb) of cargo, with 1,400 kg (3,100 lb) of this being dry cargo.

- Dry cargo: 1,400 kg (3,100 lb)
- Propellant: 600 kg (1,300 lb)
- Pressurized Gases: 40.5 kg (89 lb)
- Drinking Water: 420 kg (930 lb)

== Undocking and decay ==
The Progress MS-16 was expected to remain docked at the station until 23 July 2021, 12:45 UTC, when it would depart with the Pirs module docked to it for destructive reentry four hours later over the South Pacific Ocean, which would also mark the first module to be decommissioned from use aboard the International Space Station. The Nauka module, which would replace Pirs after its fiery reentry and subsequent destruction, was launched on 21 July 2021 at 14:58:25 UTC, for docking on 29 July 2021, at 13:25 UTC. However, due to post-launch telemetry and propulsion issues with Nauka, the undocking of Progress MS-16 was delayed to 26 July 2021, at 10:55 UTC. The spacecraft, together with the Pirs module, was successfully deorbited on the same day at 14:51 UTC.

== Gallery ==
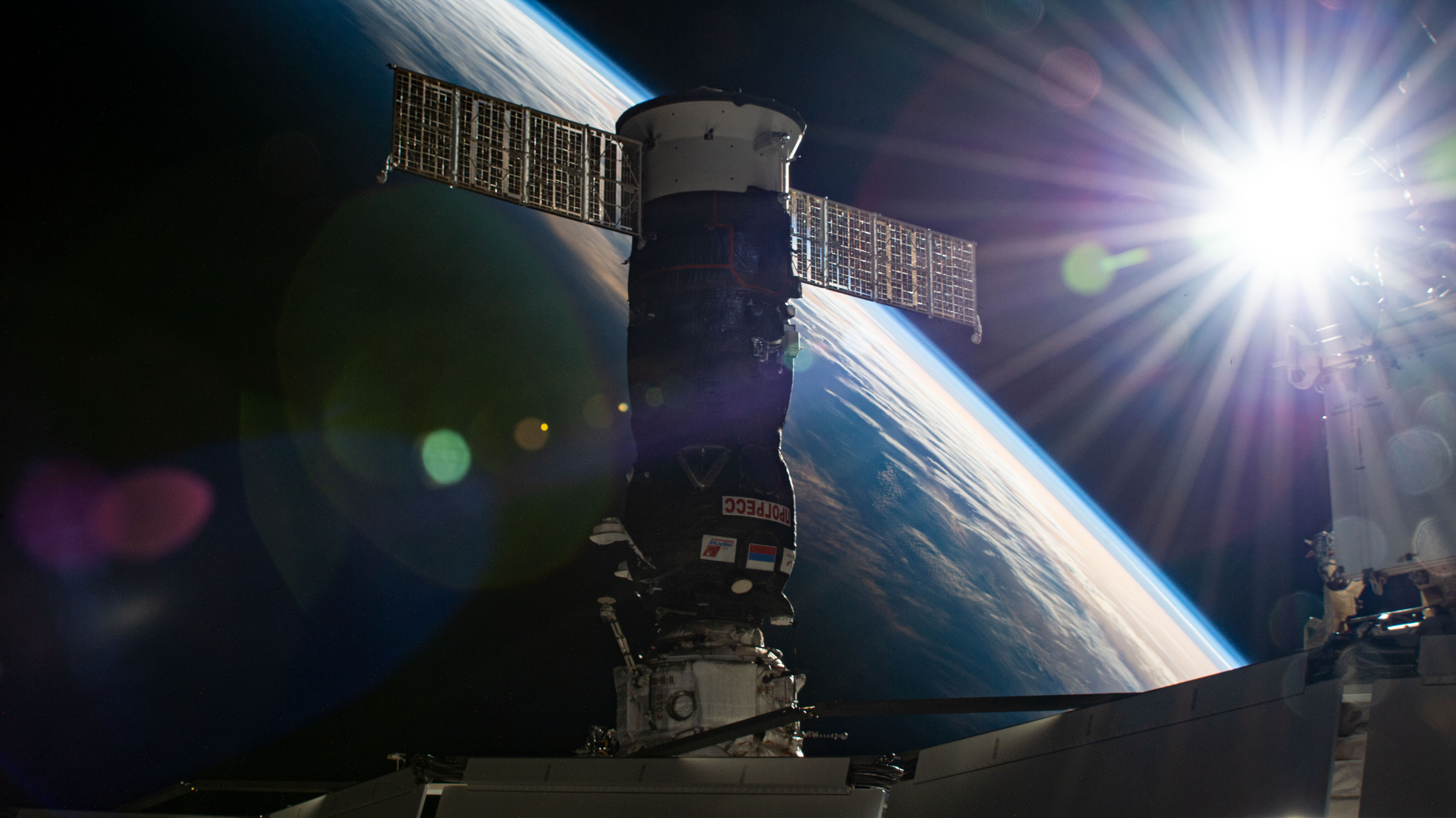
Progress MS-16 docked to the ISS. The one who undocked Pirs.

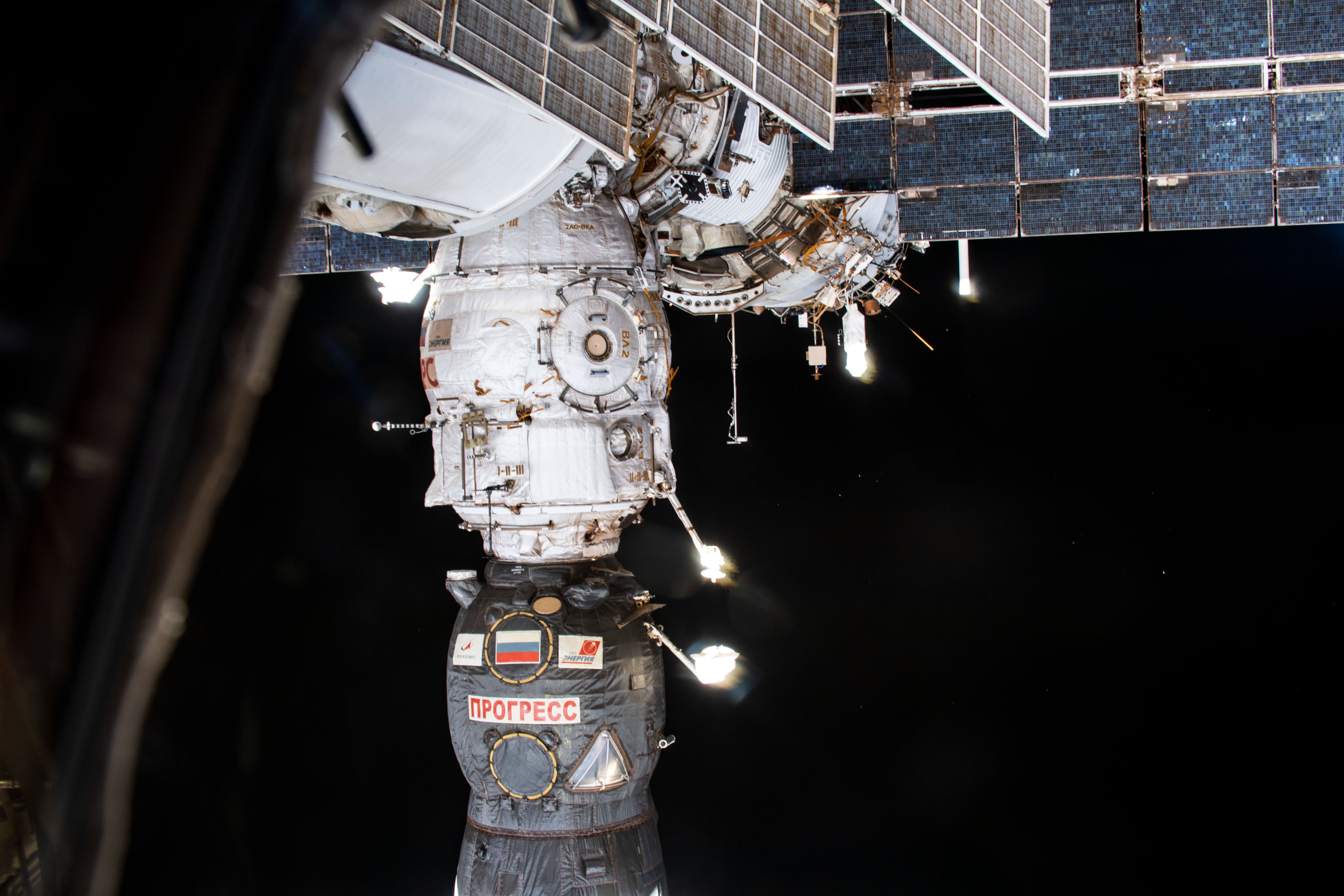
Progress MS-16 docked to the ISS before the removal of Pirs

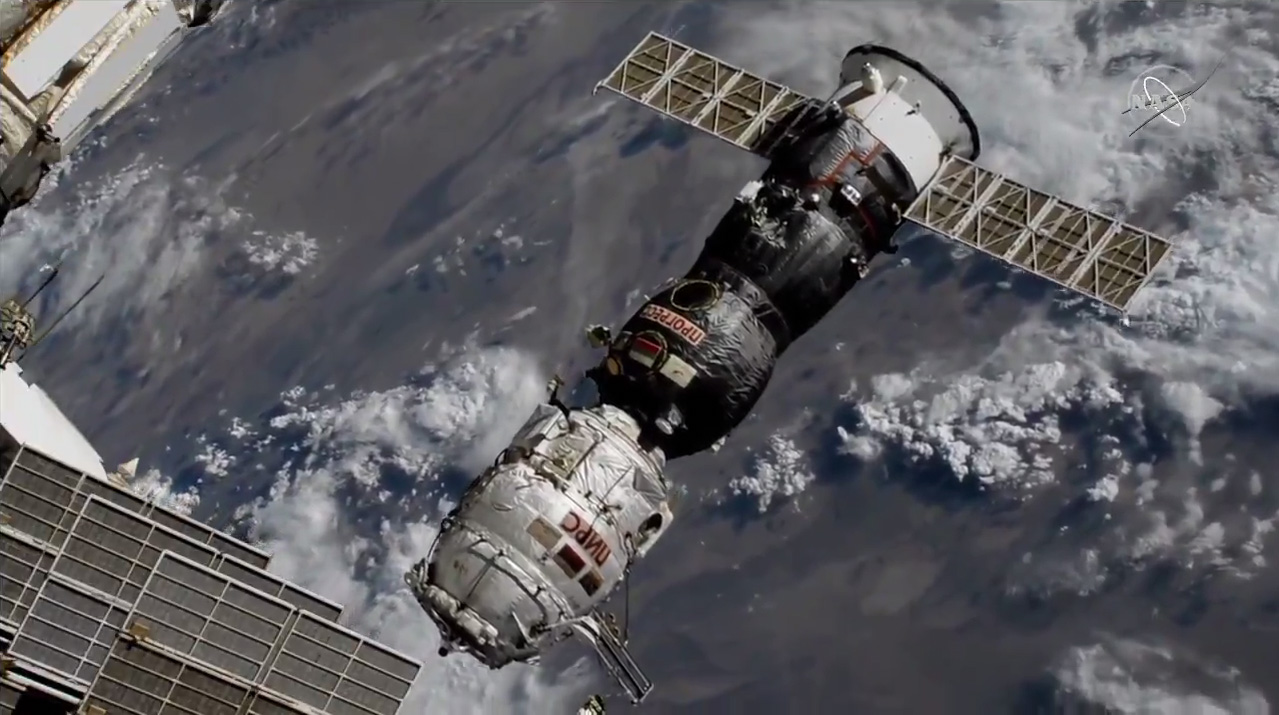
ISS-65 Pirs docking compartment separates from the Space Station

ISS-65 Pirs docking compartment separates from the Space Station

== See also ==
- Uncrewed spaceflights to the International Space Station
