= OPUSAT-II =

Type of CubeSat

OPUSAT-II (COSPAR 1998-067SG, SATCAT 47930) was a CubeSat developed by Osaka Prefecture University and Muroran Institute of Technology. OPUSAT-II was launched from Wallops Flight Facility on 20 February 2021, and was deployed from the International Space Station. The satellite was nicknamed HIROGARI, for a Japanese word meaning spread, or expand.

== Spacecraft ==
The satellite's satellite bus was based on the design of Osaka Prefecture University's previous satellite, OPUSAT, which was launched in 2014. OPUSAT-II had a design life of five and a half months.

== Mission ==
OPUSAT-II had two main missions. The first mission was to demonstrate high-speed data transmission in amateur radio band. According to the project's website, the satellite communication system's design and the results of the experiment would be made public.

The second mission was a deployment of a large folded structure. A deployable plastic plate was stored inside the satellite, based on Miura fold. The folding method that was tested in this mission took into account the thickness of the plate, unlike the traditional Miura fold. The satellite would optically measure the deployment using a pair of cameras. The team proposes applying this folding method on space-based solar power in the future.

OPUSAT-II decayed from orbit on 15 April 2022.

== See also ==
- RSP-01
- STARS-EC
- WARP-01
