= Astrocast =

Swiss satellite communications company

Astrocast is a Swiss satellite communications company based in Lausanne. It aims to establish a global satellite network for IoT applications.

== History ==
Astrocast was founded in 2014 by EPFL alumni, and employed 70 people in 2021. It launched its first five satellites in December 2018 aboard a SpaceX Falcon 9 rocket, and another five in June 2021. It aims to operate a full network of 100 satellites by 2024. Astrocast's nanosatellites are CubeSats, cubes 10 cm (3.9 in) large.

Astrocast is backed by venture capital firm Adit Ventures, Airbus SE's venture arm and the European Space Agency. In June 2022, Astrocast announced that it was acquiring Hiber, an Amsterdam-based IoT space tech company.

== Satellites launched ==
As of November 2024 the company has launched two test satellites and four batches of operational satellites, for a total of 20 spacecraft, of which 19 are currently in orbit around the Earth.

Flight No.	Mission	COSPAR ID	Launch date	Launch vehicle	Orbit altitude	Inclination	Number deployed	Deorbited
Test satellites
1	Astrocast 0.1 Kiwi	2018-099AS	3 December 2018	Falcon 9 Block 5	548 km x 562 km	97.6°	1	0
2	Astrocast 0.2 Hawaii	2019-018F	1 April 2019	PSLV-QL			1	1
Operational satellites
3	Astrocast 0101-0105	2021-006	24 January 2021	Falcon 9 Block 5	521 km x 533 km	97.4°	5	0
4	Astrocast 0201-0205	2021-059	30 June 2021	Falcon 9 Block 5	510 km x 530 km	97.6°	5	0
5	Astrocast 0301-0304	2022-158	26 November 2022	PSLV-XL	504 km x 517 km	97.4°	4	0
6	Astrocast 0401-0404	2023-001	3 January 2023	Falcon 9 Block 5	540 km x 550 km	97.6°	4	0
