= Suisen =

Suisen (すいせん), also known as Fukui Prefectural Satellite, is an Earth observation satellite of the Fukui Satellite Technology & Research Association (FSTRA). It was developed mainly by companies within Fukui Prefecture, Japan. The satellite is named for Fukui's prefectural flower, narcissus.

== Overview ==
Suisen was developed by a consortium of seven companies, led by Seiren Co., Ltd., and including Axelspace Corporation. Axelspace previously developed several small satellites, including Hodoyoshi 1 and RAPIS-1. Development of the Suisen satellite began in 2015.

Residents of Fukui Prefecture were invited to suggest the name for the satellite, and on 10 November 2019, Suisen was revealed as the chosen name. Fukui Prefecture has used Hometown tax to collect the project's cost. According to Fukui Prefecture, Suisen is the first case in Japan for a local government to lead a satellite project.

== See also ==
- Community building
