= GuaraníSat-1 =

Paraguayan satellite

- Mission type: Technology demonstration
- COSPAR ID: 1998-067SH
- SATCAT no.: 47931
- Mission duration: 1 year, 3 months and 21 days

Spacecraft properties
- Spacecraft type: 1U CubeSat
- Launch mass: 1.3 kg (2.9 lb)
- Dimensions: 10 × 10 × 10 cm

Start of mission
- Launch date: 20 February 2021, 17:36:50 UTC
- Rocket: Antares 230+
- Launch site: Wallops Island MARS, LP-0A
- Contractor: Northrop Grumman
- Deployed from: ISS
- Deployment date: 14 March 2021

End of mission
- Decay date: 5 July 2022

Orbital parameters
- Regime: Low Earth orbit

GuaraníSat-1 was the first Paraguayan satellite. The nanosatellite's development was part of a collaboration between the Paraguayan Space Agency and the fourth Joint Global Multination Birds Satellite (Birds-4) multi-national project initiated by the Kyushu Institute of Technology of Japan.

== Launch and mission ==
GuaraníSat-1 was launched to the International Space Station (ISS) through Northrop Grumman's Cygnus NG-15 launch. The S.S. Katherine Johnson Cygnus, carrying cargo including GuaraníSat-1, was launched to space via the Antares rocket on 20 February 2021 from Pad 0A of the Mid-Atlantic Regional Spaceport in Virginia, United States. The Cygnus spacecraft made a rendezvous with the ISS two days later, berthing to the Unity module of the space station. The satellite was deployed into low Earth orbit from the ISS on 14 March 2021.

The satellite's mission involved monitoring the prevalence of the Chagas disease in the Chaco region of Paraguay. The satellite was operated from ground stations at the Universidad Nacional de Asunción and the Chaco area.

GuaraníSat-1 reentered the atmosphere on 5 July 2022.
