= Myanmar Aerospace Engineering University =

Aerospace engineering university in Myanmar

- မြန်မာနိုင်ငံလေကြောင်းနှင့်အာကာသပညာတက္ကသိုလ်
- Type: Public
- Established: 15 February 2002; 24 years ago
- Affiliations: Ministry of Education
- Rector: Kyi Thwin, ဒေါက်တာ ကြည်သွင်
- Students: 279 (2005)
- Location: Meiktila, Mandalay Region, Myanmar; 20°53′41″N 95°53′41″E
- Website: maeu.edu.mm

Myanmar Aerospace Engineering University (Burmese: မြန်မာနိုင်ငံ လေကြောင်းနှင့်အာကာသပညာ တက္ကသိုလ်; abbreviated MAEU) is a specialized public university of aerospace engineering, located in Meiktila, Myanmar. The university offers undergraduate diploma, bachelor's degree and post-graduate diploma programs in several aerospace engineering specializations and technologies.

== History ==
Prior to MAEU's founding in 2002, Yangon Technological University was the only institution in Myanmar that offered studies in aerospace engineering. YTU began a Bachelor of Engineering degree program in Aeronautical Engineering in 1991, and in 1997 upgraded the program to Aerospace Engineering, ostensibly to "study the space technology and application". In 2002, the military government established a specialized university for aerospace engineering in Meiktila, home of the central command of Myanmar Air Force, possibly with Russian and Chinese technical assistance.

On 14 February 2020, in the aftermath of the 2021 Myanmar coup d'état, 20 soldiers raided the MAEU campus, in relation to the participation of the campus faculty and student body in the ongoing civil disobedience movement.

== Campus ==
The 45.5-hectare (112.5-acre) campus of the university is located on the Yangon-Mandalay highway, next to the Ground Training Base of Myanmar Air Force (Meiktila Air Base).

== Programs ==
MAEU offers six-year Bachelor of Engineering (BE) degree programs and one-year post-graduate diplomas in various specializations of aerospace engineering.

=== Bachelor's ===
- Propulsion and Flight Vehicles (စက်နှင့်ပျံသန်းယာဉ်)
- Avionics (လေကြောင်း အီလက်ထရောနစ် စနစ်)
- Electrical Systems and Instrumentation (လျှပ်စစ်နှင့်တိုင်းတာပစ္စည်း)
- Fuel and Propellant Engineering (လောင်စာနှင့်တွန်းကန်ပစ္စည်း)
- Space Systems Engineering (အာကာသစနစ် အင်ဂျင်နီယာ)

=== Post-graduate diploma ===
- Airport Management (Dip.A.M.)

== Faculty ==
=== Main departments ===
- Department of Propulsion and Flight Vehicles
- Department of Avionics
- Department of Electrical System & Instrumentation
- Department of Fuel & Propellant Engineering
- Department of Space Systems Engineering

=== Supporting departments ===
- Department of Myanmar
- Department of English
- Department of Engineering Mathematics
- Department of Engineering Chemistry
- Department of Engineering Physics
- Department of Computer Science
- Department of Workshop Technology

=== Research departments ===
- Department of UAV Research (မောင်းသူမဲ့လေယာဉ်သုတေသနဌာန)
