= Cygnus NG-15 =

2021 American resupply spaceflight to the ISS

NG-15
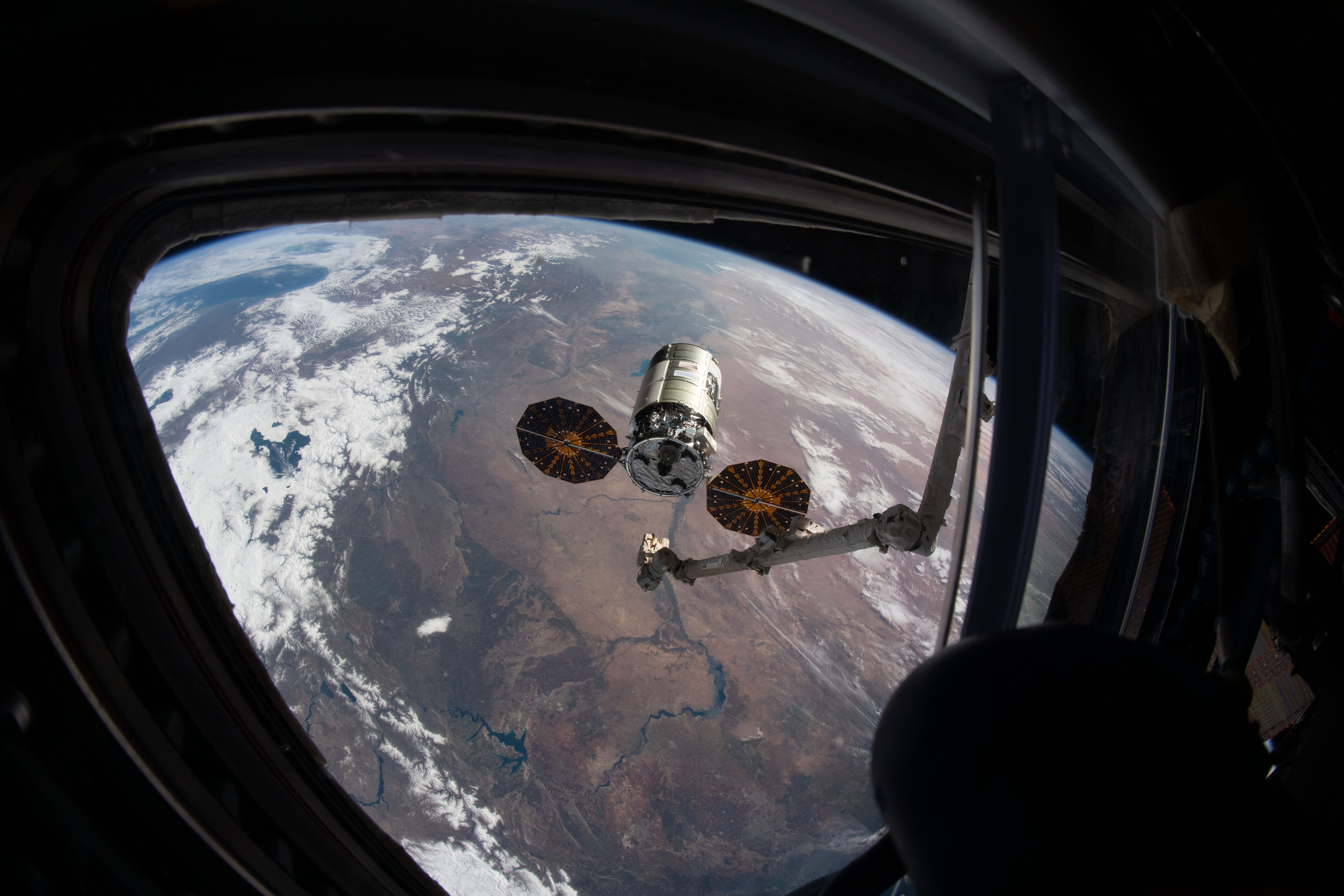
- Canadarm2 approaches the S.S. Katherine Johnson
- Names: CRS NG-15; CRS OA-15 (2016–2018)
- Mission type: ISS resupply
- Operator: Northrop Grumman
- COSPAR ID: 2021-013A
- SATCAT no.: 47689
- Website: NG-15
- Mission duration: 131 days, 7 hours, 53 minutes

Spacecraft properties
- Spacecraft: S.S. Katherine Johnson
- Spacecraft type: Enhanced Cygnus
- Manufacturer: Northrop Grumman; Thales Alenia Space

Start of mission
- Launch date: 20 February 2021, 17:36:50 UTC (12:36:50 pm EST)
- Rocket: Antares 230+
- Launch site: MARS, Pad 0A

End of mission
- Disposal: Deorbited
- Decay date: 2 July 2021, 01:30 UTC

Orbital parameters
- Reference system: Geocentric orbit
- Regime: Low Earth orbit
- Inclination: 51.63°

Berthing at ISS
- Berthing port: Unity nadir
- RMS capture: 22 February 2021, 09:38 UTC
- Berthing date: 22 February 2021, 12:16 UTC
- Unberthing date: 29 June 2021, 13:20 UTC
- RMS release: 29 June 2021, 16:32 UTC
- Time berthed: 127 days, 1 hour, 4 minutes

Cargo
- Mass: 3,810 kg (8,400 lb)
- Pressurised: 3,734 kg (8,232 lb)
- Unpressurised: 76 kg (168 lb)
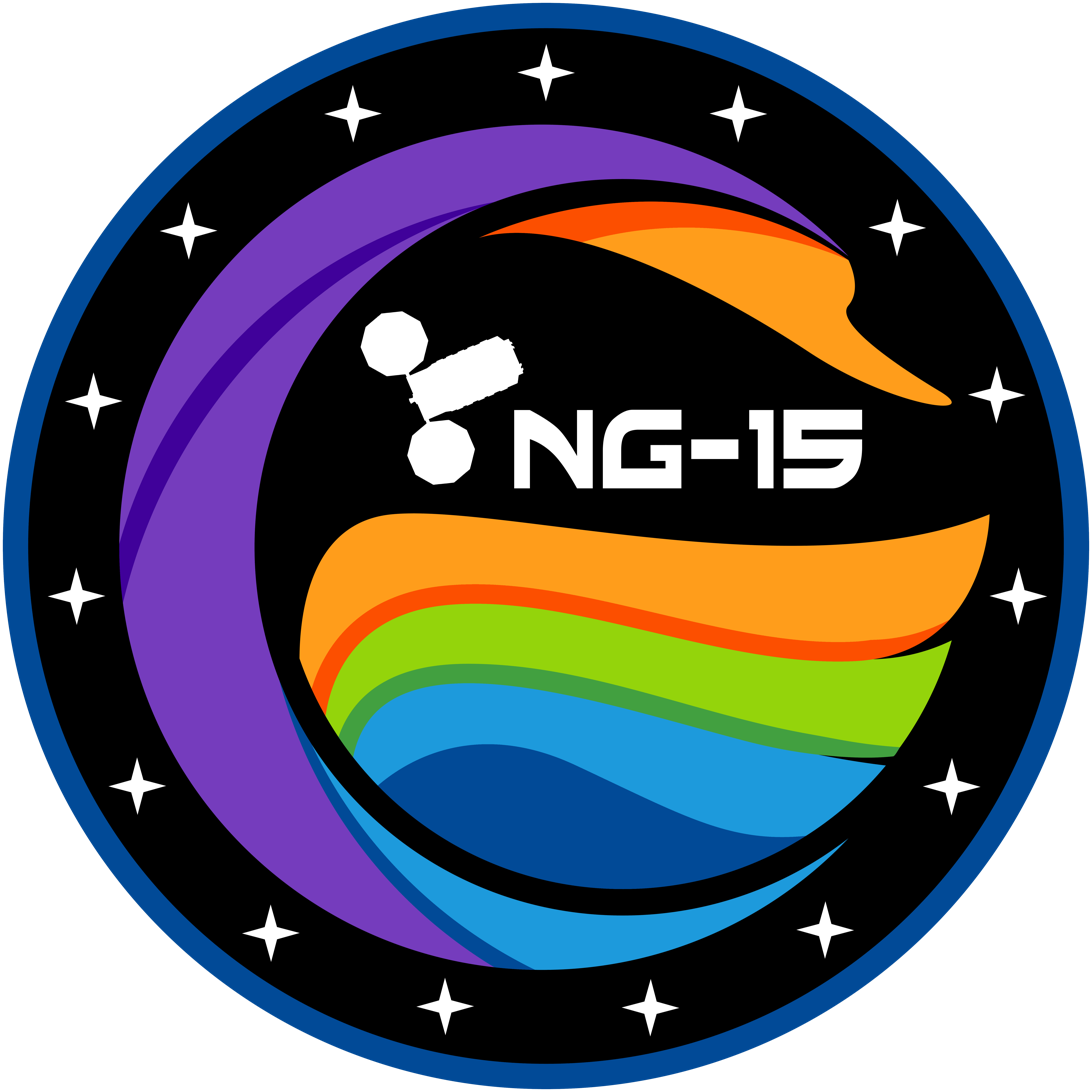
- NASA insignia Commercial Resupply Services Cygnus flights

Cygnus NG-15, previously known as OA-15, was the fifteenth launch of the Northrop Grumman robotic resupply spacecraft Cygnus and its fourteenth flight to the International Space Station (ISS) under the Commercial Resupply Services (CRS) contract with NASA. The mission launched on 20 February 2021 at 17:36:50 UTC. This is the fourth launch of Cygnus under the CRS-2 contract.

Orbital ATK (now Northrop Grumman Innovation Systems) and NASA jointly developed a new space transportation system to provide commercial cargo resupply services to the International Space Station (ISS). Under the Commercial Orbital Transportation Services (COTS) program, Orbital ATK designed, acquired, built, and assembled these components: Antares, a medium-class launch vehicle; Cygnus, an advanced spacecraft using a Pressurized Cargo Module (PCM) provided by industrial partner Thales Alenia Space of Turin, Italy, and a Service Module based on the Orbital GEOStar satellite bus.

== History ==
NASA held a pre-launch briefing for the Northrop Grumman Cygnus NG-15 cargo launch to the International Space Station (ISS) on 19 February 2021 at 16:00 UTC. Late cargo loading concluded on 19 February 2021. The Cygnus NG-15 spacecraft launched the next day at 17:36:50 UTC on an Antares launch vehicle from the Mid-Atlantic Regional Spaceport (MARS) at NASA's Wallops Flight Facility, Wallops Island, Virginia. Cygnus NG-15 is the fourth Cygnus mission under the Commercial Resupply Services-2 contract. Production and integration of Cygnus spacecraft are performed in Dulles, Virginia. The Cygnus service module is mated with the pressurized cargo module at the launch site, and mission operations are conducted from control centers in Dulles, Virginia and Houston, Texas.

== Mission ==
This was the tenth flight of the Enhanced-sized Cygnus PCM (Pressurized Cargo Module). On 1 February 2021, the start of Black History Month, Northrop Grumman announced the name of Katherine Johnson, NASA mathematician, as the name of the Cygnus spacecraft.

Once its mission has been completed, Cygnus will perform a safe, destructive reentry into atmosphere of Earth over the Pacific Ocean.

== Manifest ==
The Cygnus spacecraft was loaded with 3,810 kg (8,400 lb) of research, hardware, and crew supplies. This was the heaviest CRS cargo launch NASA made to ISS at the time. The cargo manifest is broken down as follows:

- Crew supplies: 932 kg (2,055 lb)
- Science investigations: 1,127 kg (2,485 lb)
- Spacewalk equipment: 24 kg (53 lb)
- Vehicle hardware: 1,413 kg (3,115 lb)
- Unpressurized cargo: 76 kg (168 lb)
- Computer resources: 1 kg (2.2 lb)
- Russian hardware: 24 kg (53 lb)

== Hardware ==
NASA provided the following breakdown of the cargo's hardware for ISS:

- Brine Processing Assembly and Bladder: the Environmental Control and Life Support System (ECLSS) is a system of regenerative life support hardware that provides clean air and water to the space station crew. The system will get an upgrade thanks to the Exploration ECLSS: Brine Processor System, which demonstrates technology to recover additional water from the Urine Processor Assembly using a membrane distillation process. Long-duration crewed exploration missions require about 98% water recovery, and there is currently no state-of-the-art technology in brine processing that can help achieve this goal. This Brine Processor System plans to close this gap for the urine waste stream of the space station.
- Crew Alternate Sleep Accommodation (CASA): additional crew sleeping quarters capability to support increased crew in the Commercial Crew era, scheduled for use in the Columbus module.
- Nitrogen/Oxygen Recharge System (NORS) Recharge Tanks: supplemental nitrogen to support payloads and other activities onboard the ISS that requires high pressure nitrogen.
- Commercial Air Tanks: first flight disposable air tanks that will support routine cabin repress activities on-orbit.
- Universal Waste Management System (UWMS) Hardware: critical consumable items to support operations of the next generation toilet system during the 2021 timeframe.
- Waste and Hygiene Compartment (WHC) Separator Pump: critical spare for the legacy toilet capability to be maintained throughout 2021 to support increased crew in conjunction with initial UWMS operations.

== Research ==
The new experiments arriving at the orbiting laboratory on the Cygnus NG-15 mission supports science from human health to high-powered computing, and utilizes the space station as a proving ground for the technologies needed for future missions to the Moon and on to Mars.

- Muscle Strength in Microgravity: tiny worms could help us determine the cause of muscle weakening that astronauts can experience in microgravity. Thanks to a new device for measuring the muscle strength of tiny C. elegans worms, researchers with the Micro-16 study can test whether decreased expression of muscle proteins is associated with this decreased strength.
- Astronaut Sleep in Microgravity: dreams experiment will take a closer look at astronaut sleep. The investigation serves as a technology demonstration of the Dry-EEG Headband in microgravity, while also monitoring astronaut sleep quality during a long-duration flight mission.
- Protein-Based Artificial Retina Manufacturing: millions of people on Earth suffer from retinal degenerative diseases. Artificial retinas or retinal implants may provide a way to restore meaningful vision for those affected. In 2018, startup LambdaVision sent their first experiment to the space station to determine if the process used to create artificial retinal implants by forming a thin film one layer at a time may work better in microgravity.
- SpaceBorne Computer-2: Spaceborne Computer-2 will explore how commercial off-the-shelf computer systems can advance space exploration by processing data significantly faster in space, speeding scientists’ time-to-insight from months to minute.
- Hybrid Electronic Radiation Assessor (HERA): the A-HoSS investigation will put the tools for the crewed Artemis II mission, in 2023, to the test at ISS. Built as the primary radiation detection system for the Orion spacecraft, the Hybrid Electronic Radiation Assessor (HERA) was modified for operation on the space station. By verifying that HERA can operate without error for 30 days, it validates the system for crewed Artemis mission operations.
- Real-Time Protein Crystal Growth 2: revealing protein structure leads to an understanding of its function, but it is difficult to analyze protein structures here on Earth where gravity interferes with optimal growth. Previous research has shown that microgravity produces high-quality protein crystals that can be analyzed to identify possible targets for drugs to treat disease.

== Cubesats ==
ELaNa 33, Educational Launch of Nanosatellites, will deploy the following CubeSats from ISS:

- IT-SPINS (SpaceBuoy), operated by Montana State University at Bozeman, Montana, externally deployed by Cygnus spacecraft.

Nanoracks deployer: two CubeSats released via Nanoracks CubeSat Deployer, on 30 June 2021 at 22:50 UTC, including IT-SPINS and MySat-2 (Dhabisat-2), the second CubeSat developed by Khalifa University in Abu Dhabi, United Arab Emirates. MySat-2 was developed as part of Khalifa's Space Systems and Technology Concentration, a joint program established in 2015 with UAE-based satellite operator Al Yah Satellite Communications Company (Yahsat) and Northrop Grumman.

GuaraniSat 1: the first satellite of Paraguay. The space agency of Paraguay says the CubeSat was developed in partnership with engineers in Japan and universities and research centers in Paraguay.

ThinSat-2 : 42 satellites as part of a STEM outreach program (for grades 4-12 and through the university level) by the Virginia Commercial Space Flight Authority. These was launched from the Antares second stage, with Cygnus.

== Gallery ==
Cygnus NG-15
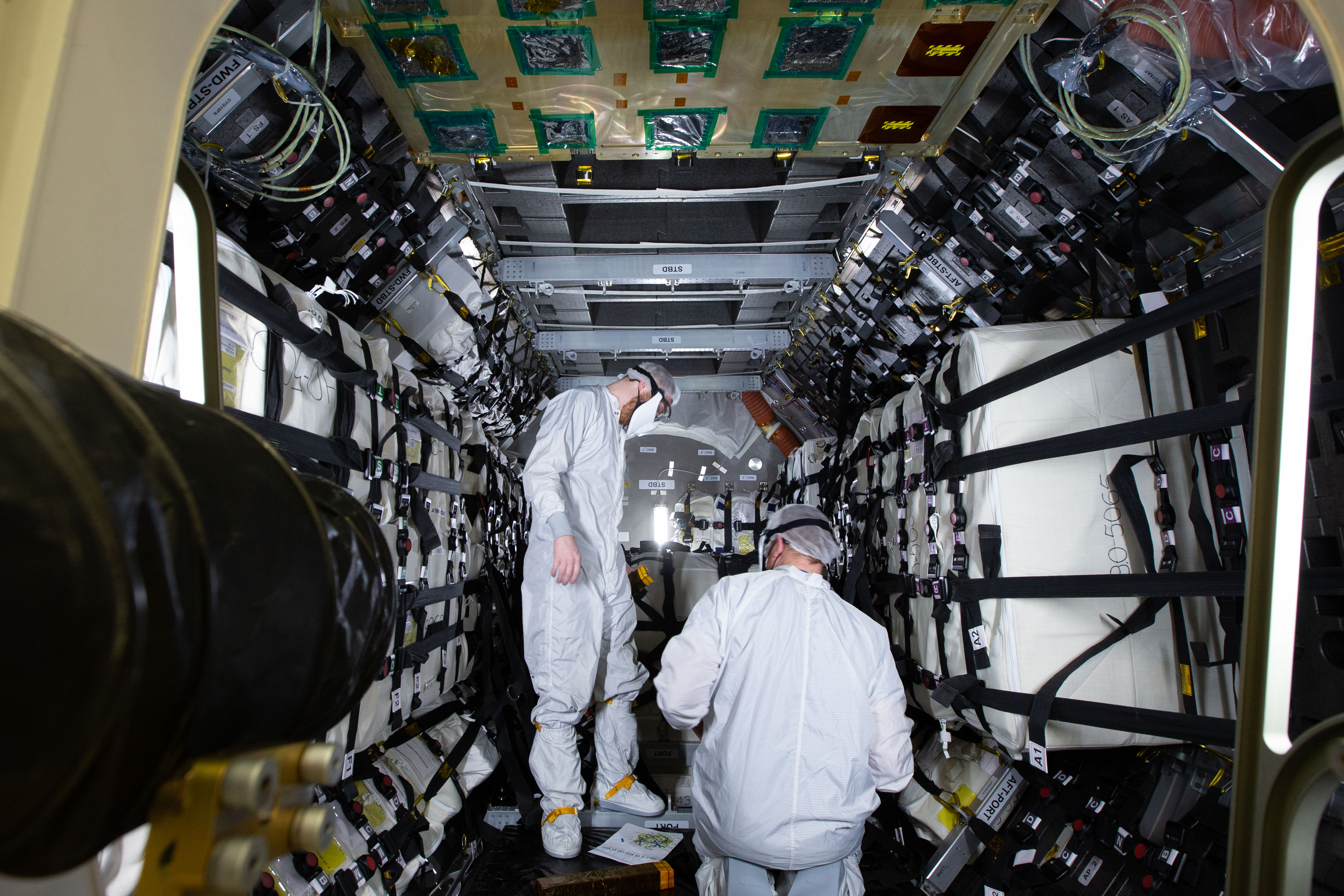
Cargo loading in Cygnus ahead of launch

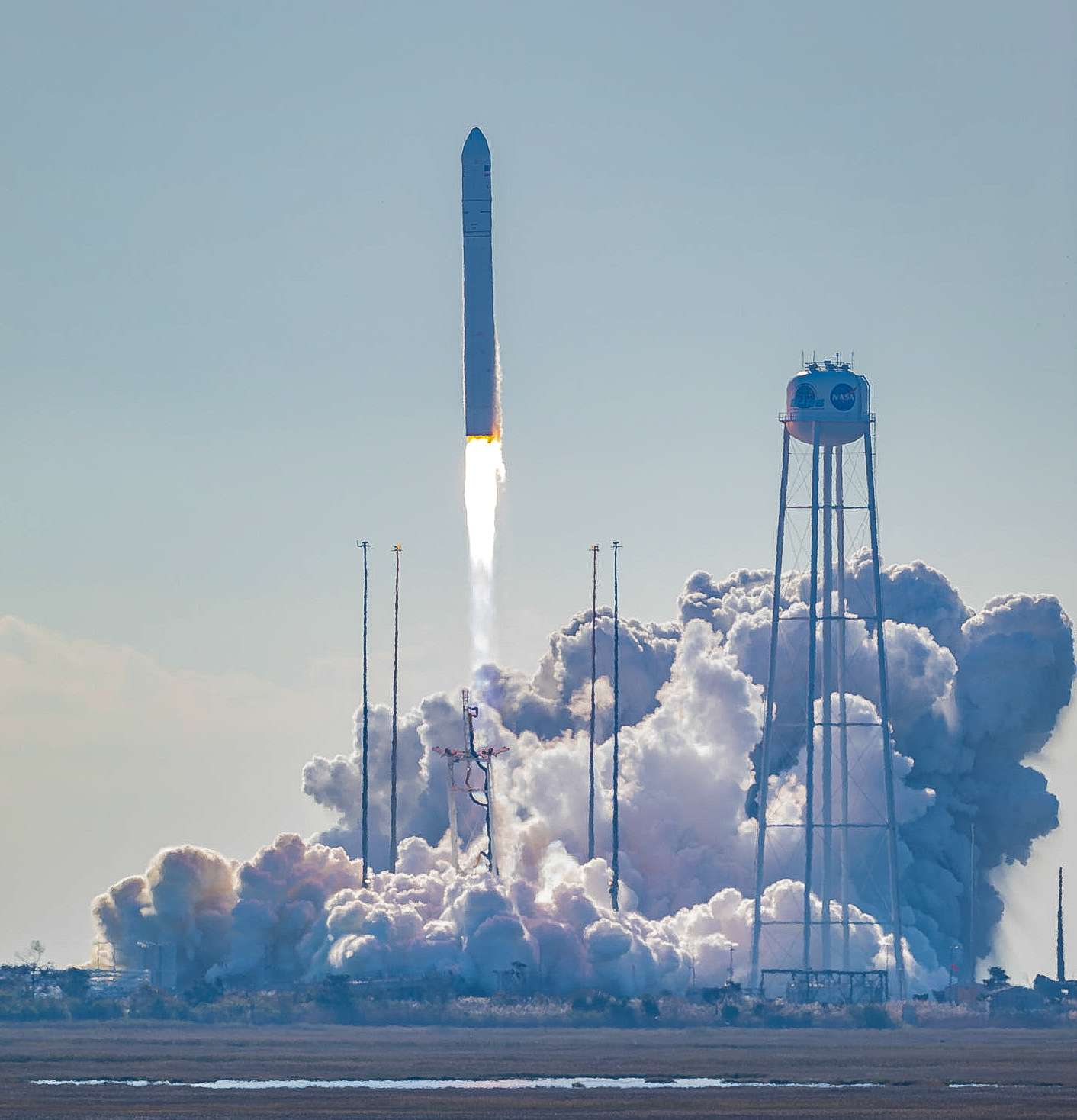
Launch of Cygnus NG-15

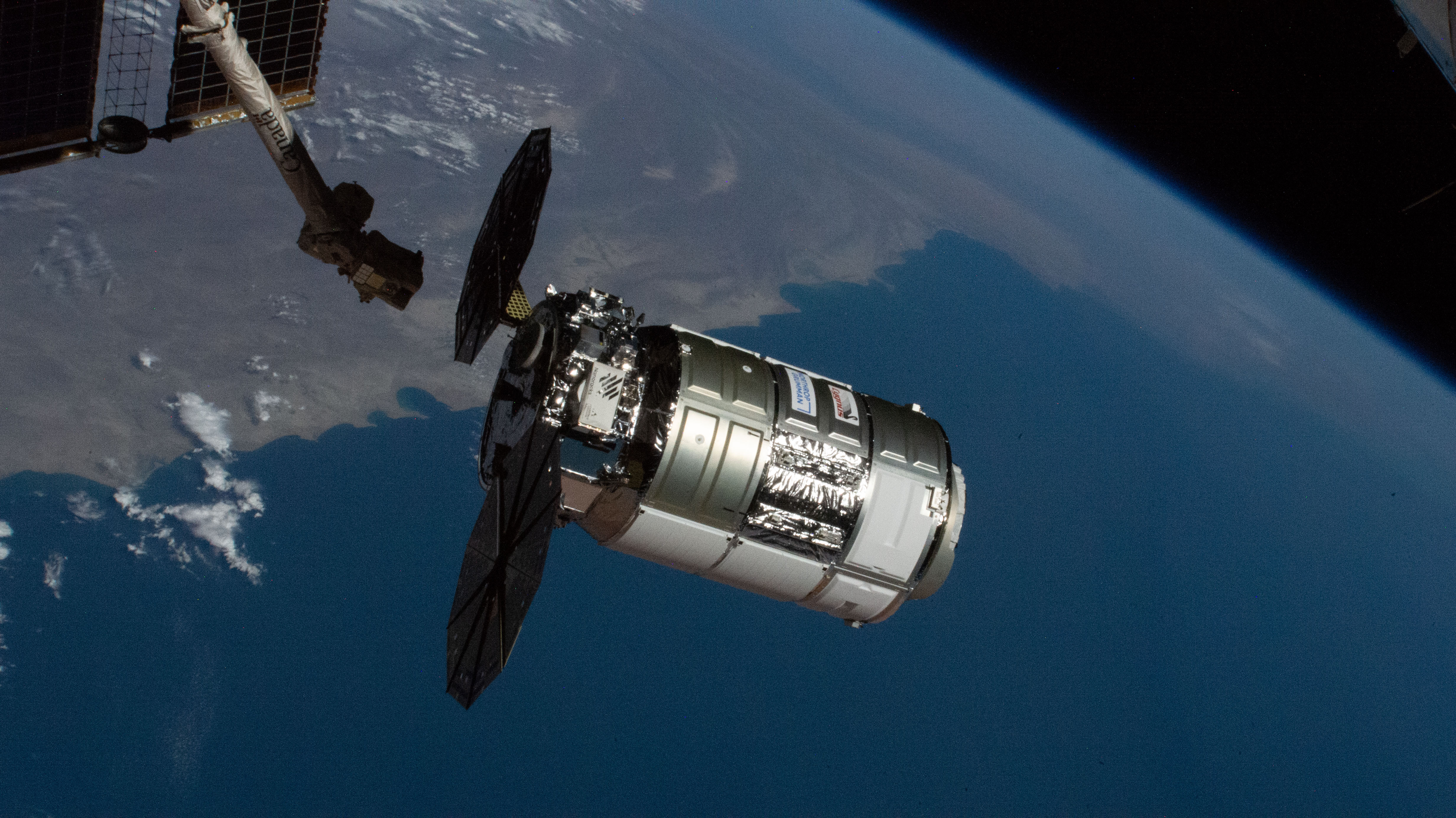
Cygnus approaching the ISS

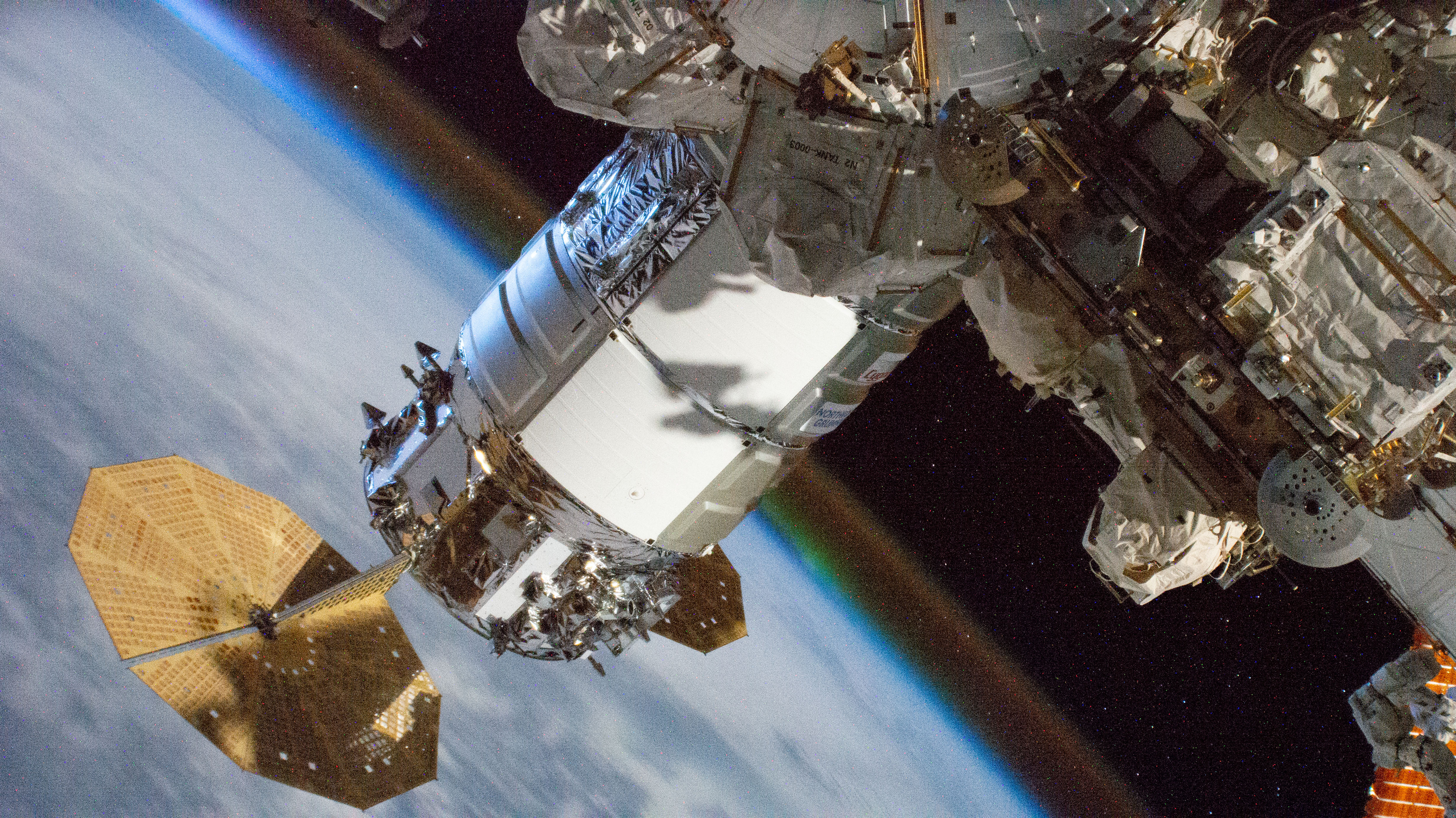
Cygnus berthed to Unity

== See also ==
- Uncrewed spaceflights to the International Space Station
- MMSAT-1
