= Progress MS-13 =

2019 Russian resupply spaceflight to the ISS

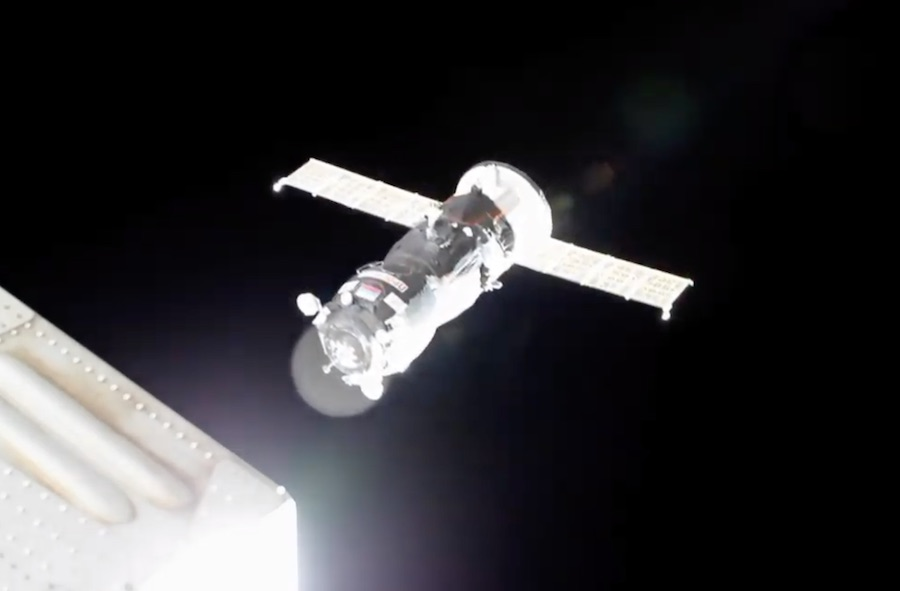
- Progress MS-13 approaches the ISS
- Names: Progress 74P
- Mission type: ISS resupply
- Operator: Roscosmos
- COSPAR ID: 2019-085A
- SATCAT no.: 44833
- Mission duration: 215 days, 12 hours, 30 minutes

Spacecraft properties
- Spacecraft: Progress MS-13 s/n 443
- Spacecraft type: Progress-MS
- Manufacturer: Energia
- Launch mass: 7280 kg
- Payload mass: 2480 kg

Start of mission
- Launch date: 6 December 2019, 09:34:11 UTC
- Rocket: Soyuz-2.1a (s/n N15000-034)
- Launch site: Baikonur, Site 31/6
- Contractor: RKTs Progress

End of mission
- Disposal: Deorbited
- Decay date: 8 July 2020, 22:05 UTC

Orbital parameters
- Reference system: Geocentric orbit
- Regime: Low Earth orbit
- Inclination: 51.66°

Docking with ISS
- Docking port: Pirs
- Docking date: 9 December 2019, 10:35:11 UTC
- Undocking date: 8 July 2020, 18:22 UTC
- Time docked: 212 days, 7 hours, 46 minutes

Cargo
- Mass: 2480 kg
- Pressurised: 1350 kg
- Fuel: 650 kg
- Gaseous: 50 kg
- Water: 420 kg

Progress MS-13 (Russian: Прогресс МC-13), Russian production No. 443, identified by NASA as Progress 74P, was a Progress spaceflight operated by Roscosmos to resupply the International Space Station. This was the 165th flight of a Progress spacecraft.

== History ==
The Progress-MS is an uncrewed freighter based on the Progress-M featuring improved avionics. This improved variant first launched on 21 December 2015. It has the following improvements:

- New external compartment that enables it to deploy satellites. Each compartment can hold up to four launch containers. First time installed on Progress MS-03.
- Enhanced redundancy thanks to the addition of a backup system of electrical motors for the docking and sealing mechanism.
- Improved Micrometeoroid (MMOD) protection with additional panels in the cargo compartment.
- Luch Russian relay satellites link capabilities enable telemetry and control even when not in direct view of ground radio stations.
- GNSS autonomous navigation enables real time determination of the status vector and orbital parameters dispensing with the need of ground station orbit determination.
- Real time relative navigation thanks to direct radio data exchange capabilities with the space station.
- New digital radio that enables enhanced TV camera view for the docking operations.
- The Ukrainian Chezara Kvant-V on board radio system and antenna/feeder system has been replaced with a Unified Command Telemetry System (UCTS).
- Replacement of the Kurs A with Kurs NA digital system.

== Pre-launch ==
In 2014, the launch was originally scheduled for 16 October 2018, but in September 2019, it was rescheduled to 20 December 2019. This was then moved ahead to 6 December 2019.

== Launch ==
Progress MS-13 was launched on 6 December 2019 at 09:34:11 UTC from Baikonur Cosmodrome, from the Site 31/6.

== Docking ==
To avoid docking with the ISS at the same time as SpaceX CRS-19, Progress MS-13 followed a slow three-day rendezvous trajectory rather than the fast-track three hour trajectory used on Progress MS-12. Progress MS-13 docked with the Pirs module at 10:38 UTC on 9 December 2019.

== Cargo ==
The Progress MS-13 spacecraft delivered 2480 kg of cargo, with 1350 kg being pressurized and 1130 kg being unpressurized. The following is a breakdown of cargo bound for the ISS:

- Hardware for onboard systems: 502 kg (1,107 lb)
- Medical supplies: 29 kg (64 lb)
- Personal protective gear: 66 kg (146 lb)
- Sanitary and hygiene items: 271 kg (597 lb)
- Repairs and servicing equipment: 9 kg (20 lb)
- Food: 271 kg (597 lb)
- Means of crew support: 25 kg (55 lb)
- Other payloads: 102 kg (225 lb)
- NASA cargo: 87 kg (192 lb)

== Mission ==
On 3 July 2020 at 15:53 UTC, Progress MS-13 fired its engines to raise the International Space Station orbit 1 km for debris collision avoidance (COLA). This was the first COLA burn for International Space Station since 2015. The debris object 27923 (1987-079AG) was predicted to pass within 1 km of the station at 18:28 UTC on 3 July 2020 over the South Atlantic. The object was one of 42 cataloged from the 1996 breakup of a motor from Proton launcher in September 1987 that put three Glonass satellites in orbit.

== Undocking and decay ==
According to Roskosmos, the vehicle undocked from the International Space Station on 8 July 2020, at 18:22 UTC. The Russian mission control commanded Progress MS-13 to fire its propulsion system on 8 July 2020, at 21:31 UTC. The maneuver resulted in the reentry of the spacecraft over a region of the Pacific Ocean at 22:05 on 8 July 2020. Eight minutes later, any surviving debris of the spacecraft were projected to hit the surface of the ocean, around 1800 km east of New Zealand.

The departure of Progress MS-13 freed the docking port Pirs for the arrival of the fresh Progress MS-15 cargo ship; Progress MS-15 launched from Baikonur Cosmodrome on 23 July 2020.

== See also ==
- Uncrewed spaceflights to the International Space Station
