= Progress MS-06 =

2017 Russian resupply spaceflight to the ISS

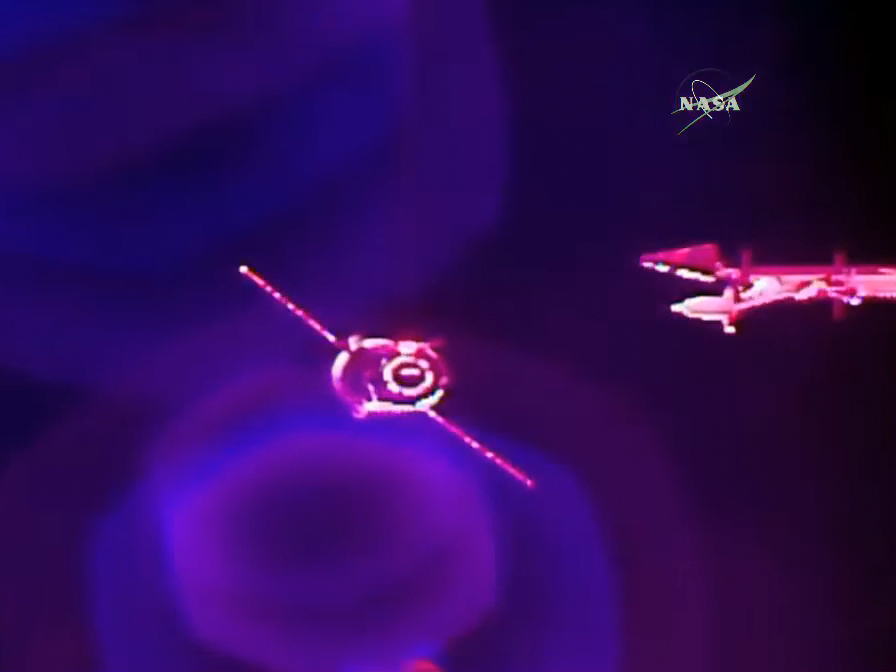
- Progress MS-06 approaches the ISS on 16 June 2017
- Names: Progress 67P
- Mission type: ISS resupply
- Operator: Roscosmos
- COSPAR ID: 2017-033A
- SATCAT no.: 42756
- Mission duration: 197 days

Spacecraft properties
- Spacecraft: Progress MS-06 s/n 436
- Spacecraft type: Progress-MS
- Manufacturer: Energia
- Launch mass: 7290 kg
- Payload mass: 2450 kg

Start of mission
- Launch date: 14 June 2017, 09:20:13 UTC
- Rocket: Soyuz-2.1a (s/n U15000-028)
- Launch site: Baikonur, Site 31/6
- Contractor: RKTs Progress

End of mission
- Disposal: Deorbited
- Decay date: 28 December 2017

Orbital parameters
- Reference system: Geocentric orbit
- Regime: Low Earth orbit
- Inclination: 51.67°

Docking with ISS
- Docking port: Zvezda
- Docking date: 16 June 2017, 11:37 UTC
- Undocking date: 28 December 2017, 01:03:30 UTC
- Time docked: 197 days

Cargo
- Mass: 2450 kg
- Pressurised: 1285 kg
- Fuel: 705 kg
- Gaseous: 50 kg
- Water: 420 kg

Progress MS-06 (Russian: Прогресс МC-06), identified by NASA as Progress 67P, was a Progress spaceflight operated by Roscosmos to resupply the International Space Station (ISS). It was launched on 14 June 2017.

== History ==
The Progress-MS is an uncrewed freighter based on the Progress-M featuring improved avionics. This improved variant first launched on 21 December 2015. It had the following improvements:

- New external compartment that enables it to deploy satellites. Each compartment can hold up to four launch containers. First time installed on Progress MS-03.
- Enhanced redundancy thanks to the addition of a backup system of electrical motors for the docking and sealing mechanism.
- Improved Micrometeoroid (MMOD) protection with additional panels in the cargo compartment.
- Luch Russian relay satellites link capabilities enable telemetry and control even when not in direct view of ground radio stations.
- GNSS autonomous navigation enables real time determination of the status vector and orbital parameters dispensing with the need of ground station orbit determination.
- Real time relative navigation thanks to direct radio data exchange capabilities with the space station.
- New digital radio that enables enhanced TV camera view for the docking operations.
- The Ukrainian Chezara Kvant-V on board radio system and antenna/feeder system has been replaced with a Unified Command Telemetry System (UCTS).
- Replacement of the Kurs A with Kurs NA digital system.

== Launch ==
Progress MS-06 launched on 14 June 2017 from the Baikonur Cosmodrome in Kazakhstan, at 09:20:13 UTC. It used a Soyuz-2.1a rocket to get to orbit, replacing the former Soyuz-U launch system.

== Docking ==
Progress MS-06 docked with the Zvezda. It was planned to dock with the Pirs module which it would remove from the space station, in preparation for the arrival of the Nauka module. However, due to the repetitive delays with the Nauka module the plan was postponed to Progress MS-09. After a two-day rendezvous, Progress MS-06 docked to the station on 16 June 2017 at 11:37 UTC.

== Cargo ==
The Progress MS-06 spacecraft delivered 2,450 kg of cargo and supplies to the International Space Station for the six-person crew. The following is a breakdown of cargo bound for the ISS:

- Fuel: 705 kg
- Oxygen and air: 50 kg
- Water: 420 kg

== Orbit ==
On 27 August 2017, Progress MS-06's engines were used for a 177-second burn to raise the ISS by around 0.97 km (average orbital altitude).

== Undocking and decay ==
Progress MS-06 undocked on 28 December 2017 and re-entered the atmosphere at 04:43 UTC. Its debris entered the Pacific Ocean at 04:51:34 UTC.

== Launch fire ==
The strap-on boosters ignited dry grass on impact 600 kilometers downrange from the Baikonur Cosmodrome causing a fire 15 km across. NPO Mashinostroyeniya employed workers to clear debris. One worker was killed and another hospitalized by the fires.
