= Progress MS-07 =

2017 Russian resupply spaceflight to the ISS

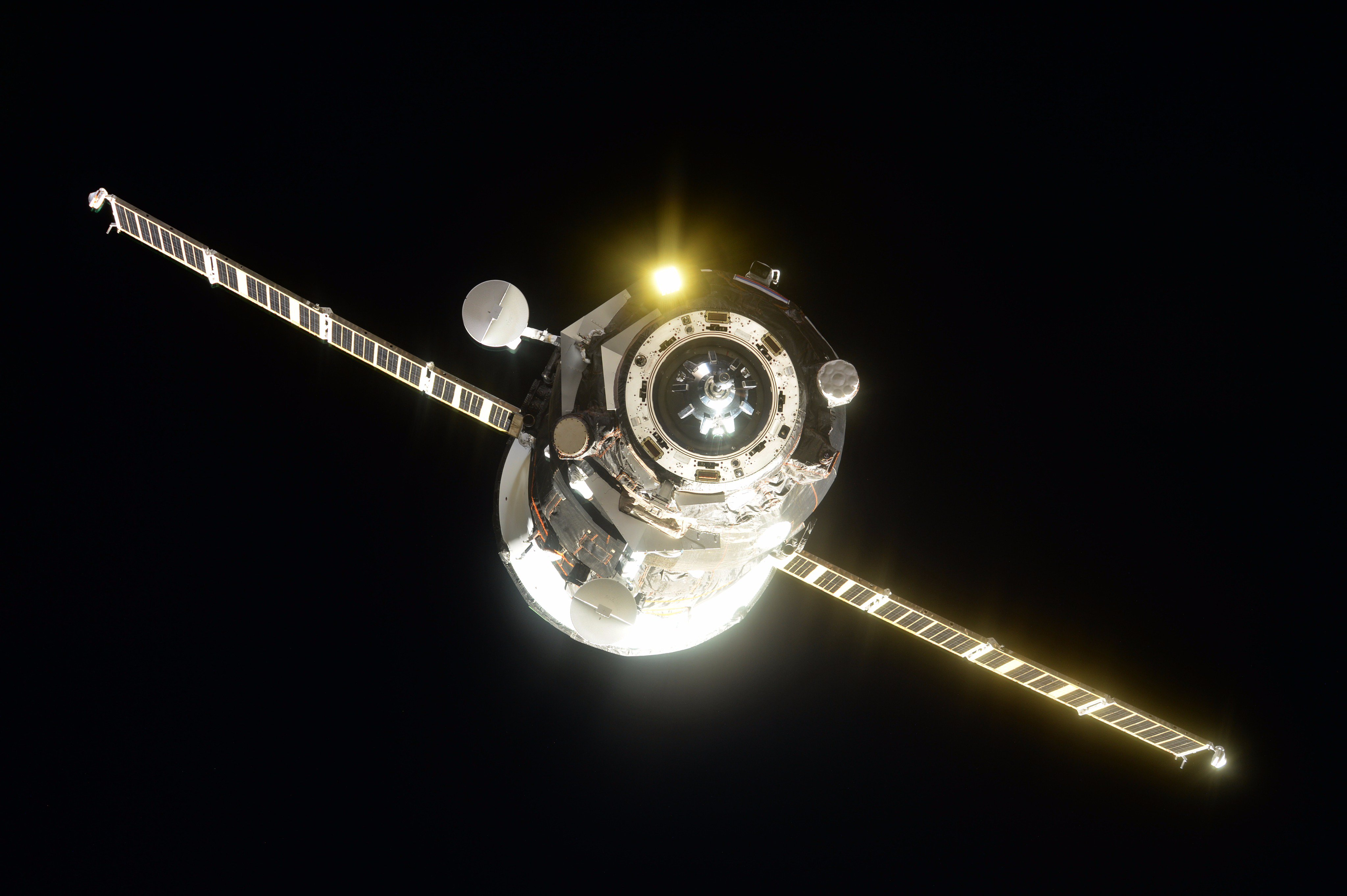
- Progress MS-07 docking with the ISS on 16 October 2017
- Names: Progress 68P
- Mission type: ISS resupply
- Operator: Roscosmos
- COSPAR ID: 2017-065A
- SATCAT no.: 42971
- Mission duration: 194 days

Spacecraft properties
- Spacecraft: Progress MS-07 s/n 437
- Spacecraft type: Progress-MS
- Manufacturer: Energia
- Launch mass: 7428 kg
- Payload mass: 2549 kg

Start of mission
- Launch date: 14 October 2017, 08:46:53 UTC
- Rocket: Soyuz-2.1a (s/n U15000-029)
- Launch site: Baikonur, Site 31/6
- Contractor: RKTs Progress

End of mission
- Disposal: Deorbited
- Decay date: 26 April 2018

Orbital parameters
- Reference system: Geocentric orbit
- Regime: Low Earth orbit
- Inclination: 51.67°

Docking with ISS
- Docking port: Pirs
- Docking date: 16 October 2017, 11:04:07 UTC
- Undocking date: 28 March 2018, 13:50:30 UTC
- Time docked: 163 days

Cargo
- Mass: 2549 kg
- Pressurised: 1382 kg
- Fuel: 700 kg
- Gaseous: 47 kg
- Water: 420 kg

Progress MS-07 (Russian: Прогресс МC-07), identified by NASA as Progress 68P, was a Progress spaceflight, operated by Roscosmos to resupply the International Space Station (ISS).

== History ==
The Progress-MS is an uncrewed freighter based on the Progress-M featuring improved avionics. This improved variant first launched on 21 December 2015. It has the following improvements:

- New external compartment that enables it to deploy satellites. Each compartment can hold up to four launch containers. First time installed on Progress MS-03.
- Enhanced redundancy thanks to the addition of a backup system of electrical motors for the docking and sealing mechanism.
- Improved Micrometeoroid (MMOD) protection with additional panels in the cargo compartment.
- Luch Russian relay satellites link capabilities enable telemetry and control even when not in direct view of ground radio stations.
- GNSS autonomous navigation enables real time determination of the status vector and orbital parameters dispensing with the need of ground station orbit determination.
- Real time relative navigation thanks to direct radio data exchange capabilities with the space station.
- New digital radio that enables enhanced TV camera view for the docking operations.
- The Ukrainian Chezara Kvant-V on board radio system and antenna/feeder system has been replaced with a Unified Command Telemetry System (UCTS).
- Replacement of the Kurs A with Kurs NA digital system.

== Launch ==
After a two-day delay, the Progress MS-07 lifted off on 14 October 2017, at 08:46:53 UTC. The spacecraft docked at the station on 16 October 2017, at 11:04:07 UTC. Progress MS-07 was launched from the Baikonur Cosmodrome in Kazakhstan, atop a Soyuz-2.1a rocket.

== Docking ==
Progress MS-07 was docked with the aft docking port of the Pirs module. This Progress flight was intended to mark the debut of the new two-orbit rendezvous profile which was not possible when the original launch date had to be scrubbed.

== Cargo ==
The Progress MS-07 spacecraft delivered 2,549 kg of cargo and supplies to the International Space Station for the six-person crew. The following is a breakdown of cargo bound for the ISS:

- Dry cargo: 1,382 kg
- Fuel: 700 kg (for Zvezda service module)
- Oxygen: 23 kg
- Air: 24 kg
- Water: 420 kg

== Spacewalk ==
Once the Progress arrived at the station, Expedition 53 commander Randolph Bresnik and flight engineer Joseph M. Acaba prepared for a spacewalk, on 20 October 2017, to accomplish a variety of maintenance tasks outside the complex. This included the replacement of a fuse on the station's Canadian-built Dextre robot, replacing an external camera and light fixture, and removing thermal insulation from two spare units to prepare them for future relocation.

== Undocking and decay ==
Progress MS-07 undocked from the Pirs on 28 March 2018, at 13:50:30 UTC. The vehicle continued with experiments until 26 April 2018.
