= Progress MS-14 =

2020 Russian resupply spaceflight to the ISS

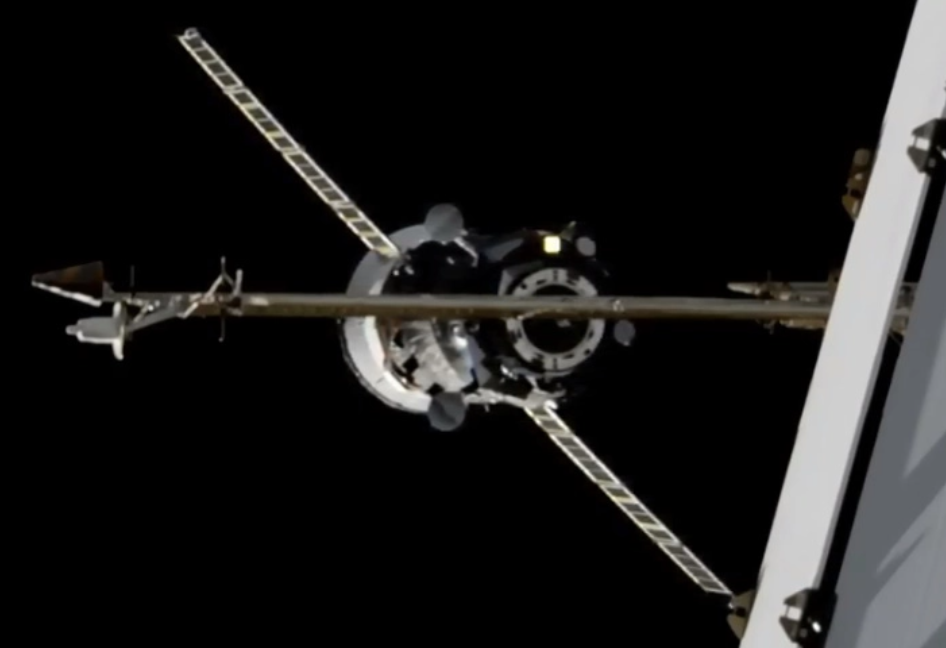
- Progress MS-14 docks with the ISS
- Names: Progress 75P
- Mission type: ISS resupply
- Operator: Roscosmos
- COSPAR ID: 2020-026A
- SATCAT no.: 45595
- Mission duration: 370 days, 1 hour, 42 minutes

Spacecraft properties
- Spacecraft: Progress MS-14 s/n 448
- Spacecraft type: Progress-MS
- Manufacturer: Energia
- Launch mass: 7430 kg
- Payload mass: 2528 kg

Start of mission
- Launch date: 25 April 2020, 01:51:41 UTC
- Rocket: Soyuz-2.1a (s/n Ya15000-038)
- Launch site: Baikonur, Site 31/6
- Contractor: RKTs Progress

End of mission
- Disposal: Deorbited
- Decay date: 29 April 2021, 00:42 UTC

Orbital parameters
- Reference system: Geocentric orbit
- Regime: Low Earth orbit
- Inclination: 51.66°

Docking with ISS
- Docking port: Zvezda aft
- Docking date: 25 April 2020, 05:11:56 UTC
- Undocking date: 27 April 2021, 23:11:00 UTC
- Time docked: 367 days, 17 hours, 59 minutes

Cargo
- Mass: 2528 kg
- Pressurised: 1358 kg (dry cargo)
- Fuel: 700 kg
- Gaseous: 50 kg (oxygen)
- Water: 420 kg

Progress MS-14 (Russian: Прогресс МC-14), Russian production No.448, identified by NASA as Progress 75P, was a Progress spaceflight operated by Roscosmos to resupply the International Space Station (ISS). This was the 166th flight of a Progress spacecraft.

== History ==
The Progress-MS was an uncrewed freighter based on the Progress-M featuring improved avionics. This improved variant first launched on 21 December 2015. It has the following improvements:

- New external compartment that enables it to deploy satellites. Each compartment can hold up to four launch containers. First time installed on Progress MS-03.
- Enhanced redundancy thanks to the addition of a backup system of electrical motors for the docking and sealing mechanism.
- Improved Micrometeoroid (MMOD) protection with additional panels in the cargo compartment.
- Luch Russian relay satellites link capabilities enable telemetry and control even when not in direct view of ground radio stations.
- GNSS autonomous navigation enables real time determination of the status vector and orbital parameters dispensing with the need of ground station orbit determination.
- Real time relative navigation thanks to direct radio data exchange capabilities with the space station.
- New digital radio that enables enhanced TV camera view for the docking operations.
- The Ukrainian Chezara Kvant-V on board radio system and antenna/feeder system has been replaced with a Unified Command Telemetry System (UCTS).
- Replacement of the Kurs A with Kurs NA digital system.

== Spacecraft ==
This flight was dedicated to the 75th anniversary of Victory: the Ribbon of Saint George and the orders of the Second World War were put on board the Soyuz. In order to prevent the Progress MS-14 coronavirus from entering the station, it underwent additional disinfection before launch before being sent. First of all, disinfection of the internal surfaces and equipment, as well as the external surfaces of the goods delivered was carried out with the selection of control samples. After refueling the vessel and upgrading the equipment, additional disinfection was carried out to prevent the virus from entering the ISS.

== Launch ==
The Soyuz-2.1a used to launch Progress MS-14, dubbed the "Victory Rocket" was decorated with the number "75" on its payload fairing to mark the 75th anniversary of the meeting of U.S. and Soviet troops on the Elbe River in Germany in the final days of World War II in Europe. The number has a double significance because the cargo mission is the 75th Progress resupply flight to the International Space Station since 2000.

Progress MS-14 was launched at 01:51:41 UTC from Baikonur Site 31/6 on a fast-track trajectory. Following a nominal launch, Progress MS-14 docked with Zvezda on the ISS at 05:11:56 UTC.

== Docking ==
3 hours and 20 minutes after launch, Progress MS-14 successfully docked automatically to the rear port of Zvezda at 05:11:56 UTC on 25 April 2020, where it remained until 27 April 2021.

== Cargo ==
The Progress MS-14 spacecraft delivered 2528 kg of cargo, with 1358 kg of this being dry cargo. The following is a breakdown of cargo bound for the ISS:

- Dry cargo: 1358 kg
- Fuel: 700 kg
- Oxygen: 50 kg
- Water: 420 kg

== Undocking and decay ==
After its mission was completed, Progress MS-14 undocked from the station on 27 April 2021 filled with disposable trash. It re-entered the Earth's atmosphere for destruction over the South Pacific Ocean at 00:42 UTC, on 29 April 2021.

== See also ==
- Uncrewed spaceflights to the International Space Station
