= Progress MS-08 =

2018 Russian resupply spaceflight to the ISS

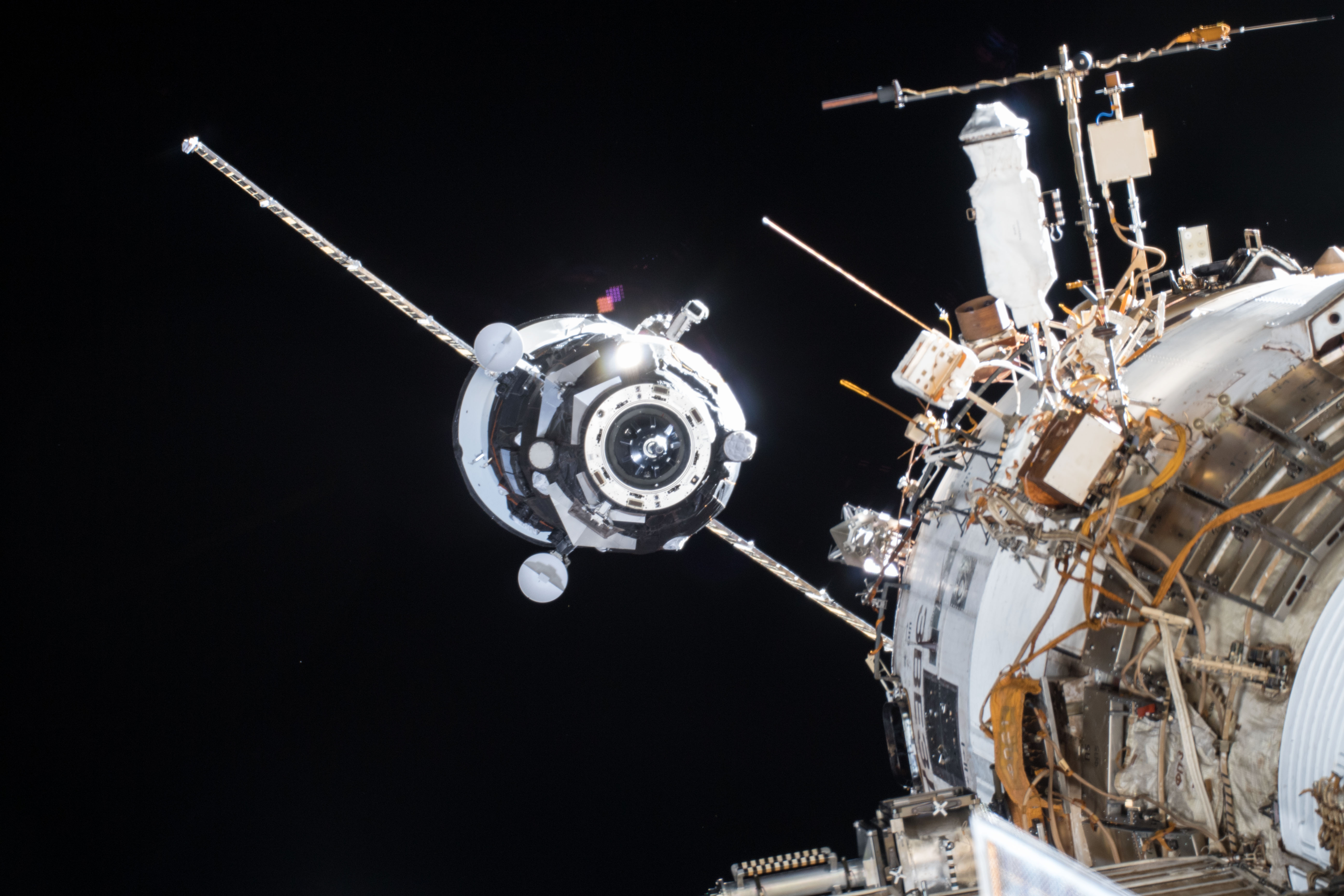
- Progress MS-08 approaches the ISS on 15 February 2018
- Names: Progress 69P
- Mission type: ISS resupply
- Operator: Roscosmos
- COSPAR ID: 2018-019A
- SATCAT no.: 43211
- Mission duration: 197 days

Spacecraft properties
- Spacecraft: Progress MS-08 s/n 438
- Spacecraft type: Progress-MS
- Manufacturer: Energia
- Launch mass: 7430 kg
- Payload mass: 2494 kg

Start of mission
- Launch date: 13 February 2018, 08:13:33 UTC
- Rocket: Soyuz-2.1a (s/n U15000-030)
- Launch site: Baikonur, Site 31/6
- Contractor: RKTs Progress

End of mission
- Disposal: Deorbited
- Decay date: 30 August 2018

Orbital parameters
- Reference system: Geocentric orbit
- Regime: Low Earth orbit
- Inclination: 51.67°

Docking with ISS
- Docking port: Zvezda
- Docking date: 15 February 2018, 10:38 UTC
- Undocking date: 23 August 2018, 02:16 UTC
- Time docked: 188 days

Cargo
- Mass: 2494 kg
- Pressurised: 1388 kg
- Fuel: 640 kg
- Gaseous: 46 kg
- Water: 420 kg

Progress MS-08 (Russian: Прогресс МC-08), identified by NASA as Progress 69P, was a Progress spaceflight, operated by Roscosmos to resupply the International Space Station (ISS).

== History ==
The Progress-MS is an uncrewed freighter based on the Progress-M featuring improved avionics. This improved variant first launched on 21 December 2015. It has the following improvements:

- New external compartment that enables it to deploy satellites. Each compartment can hold up to four launch containers. First time installed on Progress MS-03.
- Enhanced redundancy thanks to the addition of a backup system of electrical motors for the docking and sealing mechanism.
- Improved Micrometeoroid (MMOD) protection with additional panels in the cargo compartment.
- Luch Russian relay satellites link capabilities enable telemetry and control even when not in direct view of ground radio stations.
- GNSS autonomous navigation enables real time determination of the status vector and orbital parameters dispensing with the need of ground station orbit determination.
- Real time relative navigation thanks to direct radio data exchange capabilities with the space station.
- New digital radio that enables enhanced TV camera view for the docking operations.
- The Ukrainian Chezara Kvant-V on board radio system and antenna/feeder system has been replaced with a Unified Command Telemetry System (UCTS).
- Replacement of the Kurs A with Kurs NA digital system.

== Launch ==
Progress MS-08 launched on 13 February 2018 from the Baikonur Cosmodrome in Kazakhstan atop a Soyuz-2.1a rocket, at 08:13:33 UTC.

== Docking ==
Progress MS-08 docked on 15 February 2018 with the aft docking port of the Zvezda module, at 10:38 UTC.

== Cargo ==
The Progress MS-08 spacecraft delivered 2,494 kg of cargo and supplies to the International Space Station. The following is a breakdown of cargo bound for the ISS:

- Dry cargo: 1,390 kg
- Fuel: 890 kg
- Oxygen and Air: 46 kg
- Water: 430 kg

Progress MS-08 also includes two nanosatellites: Tanyusha YuZGU-3 (1998-067PJ) and Tanyusha YuZGU-4 (1998-067PK) (a.k.a. Radioskaf RS-8 and Radioskaf RS-9) with a mass of 2.5 kg, which was developed jointly by RKK Energia and students at the South-Western State University, YuZGU, in the city of Kursk. The satellites will be launched by spacewalking cosmonauts.

== Undocking and decay ==
Undocking on 23 August 2018, at 02:16 UTC. And decay in the atmosphere and its debris entered the Pacific Ocean, on 30 August 2018.
