= Progress MS-10 =

2018 Russian resupply spaceflight to the ISS

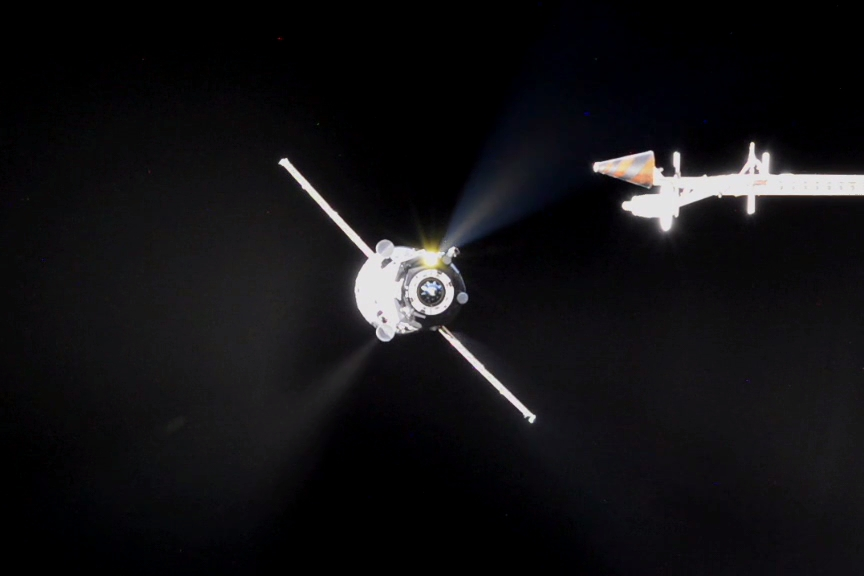
- Progress MS-10 approaches the ISS on 18 November 2018
- Names: Progress 71P
- Mission type: ISS resupply
- Operator: Roscosmos
- COSPAR ID: 2018-091A
- SATCAT no.: 43702
- Mission duration: 200 days

Spacecraft properties
- Spacecraft: Progress MS-10 s/n 440
- Spacecraft type: Progress-MS
- Manufacturer: Energia
- Launch mass: 7426 kg
- Payload mass: 2564 kg

Start of mission
- Launch date: 16 November 2018, 18:14:08 UTC
- Rocket: Soyuz-FG (s/n N15000-068)
- Launch site: Baikonur, Site 1/5
- Contractor: RKTs Progress

End of mission
- Disposal: Deorbited
- Decay date: 4 June 2019

Orbital parameters
- Reference system: Geocentric
- Regime: Low Earth
- Inclination: 51.66°

Docking with ISS
- Docking port: Zvezda
- Docking date: 18 November 2018, 19:31:38 UTC
- Undocking date: 4 June 2019, 08:40 UTC
- Time docked: 198 days

Cargo
- Mass: 2564 kg
- Pressurised: 1330 kg
- Fuel: 750 kg
- Gaseous: 75 kg
- Water: 440 kg

Progress MS-10 (Russian: Прогресс МC-10), identified by NASA as Progress 71P, was a Progress spaceflight operated by Roscosmos to resupply the International Space Station (ISS). This was the 162nd flight of a Progress spacecraft.

== History ==
The Progress-MS is an uncrewed freighter based on the Progress-M featuring improved avionics. This improved variant first launched on 21 December 2015. It has the following improvements:

- New external compartment that enables it to deploy satellites. Each compartment can hold up to four launch containers. First time installed on Progress MS-03.
- Enhanced redundancy thanks to the addition of a backup system of electrical motors for the docking and sealing mechanism.
- Improved Micrometeoroid (MMOD) protection with additional panels in the cargo compartment.
- Luch Russian relay satellites link capabilities enable telemetry and control even when not in direct view of ground radio stations.
- GNSS autonomous navigation enables real time determination of the status vector and orbital parameters dispensing with the need of ground station orbit determination.
- Real time relative navigation thanks to direct radio data exchange capabilities with the space station.
- New digital radio that enables enhanced TV camera view for the docking operations.
- The Ukrainian Chezara Kvant-V on board radio system and antenna/feeder system has been replaced with a Unified Command Telemetry System (UCTS).
- Replacement of the Kurs A with Kurs NA digital system.

== Pre-launch ==
In 2014, the launch was expected on 22 February 2018. In 2017, the mission had slipped to August 2018. In June 2018, the launch was scheduled for 31 October 2018, but in the wake of the Soyuz MS-10 accident it had to be postponed on 16 November 2018.

== Launch ==
Progress MS-10 launched atop a Soyuz-FG rocket on 16 November 2018, at 18:14:08 UTC from the Baikonur Cosmodrome in Kazakhstan.

== Docking ==
Progress MS-10 docked as scheduled with the aft docking port of the Zvezda module on 18 November 2018 at 19:31:38 UTC.

== Cargo ==
The Progress MS-10 spacecraft delivered 2,564 kg of cargo and supplies to the International Space Station. The following is a breakdown of cargo bound for the ISS:

- Dry cargo: 1,330 kg
- Fuel: 750 kg
- Oxygen: 75 kg
- Water: 440 kg

== Undocking and decay ==
It undocked at 08:40 UTC and deorbited in Pacific Ocean, on 4 June 2019 at 11:28 UTC.

== See also ==
- Uncrewed spaceflights to the International Space Station
