= Progress MS-11 =

2019 Russian resupply spaceflight to the ISS

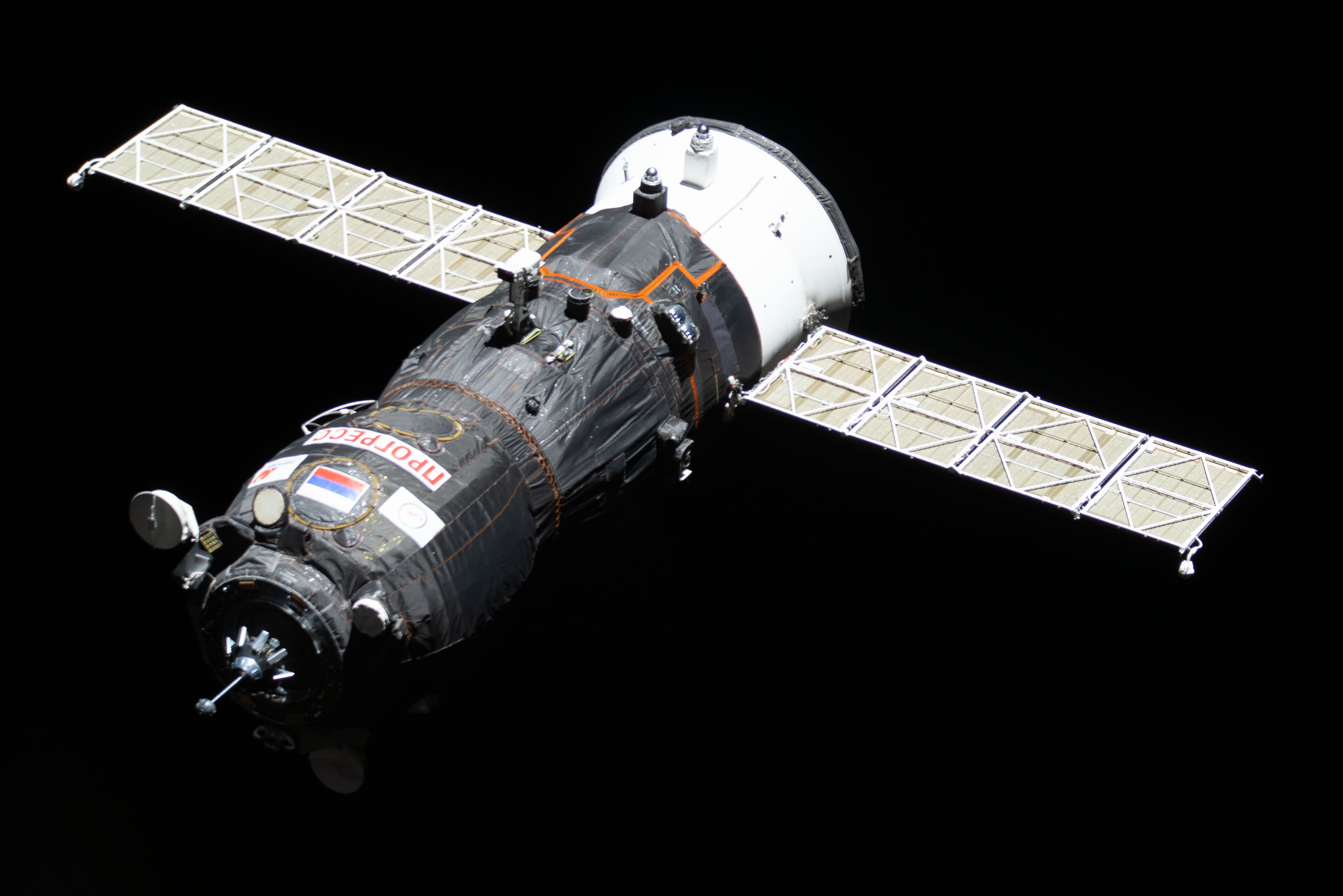
- Progress MS-11 approaches the ISS
- Names: Progress 72P
- Mission type: ISS resupply
- Operator: Roscosmos
- COSPAR ID: 2019-019A
- SATCAT no.: 44110
- Mission duration: 116 days

Spacecraft properties
- Spacecraft: Progress MS-11 n/s 441
- Spacecraft type: Progress-MS
- Manufacturer: Energia
- Launch mass: 7400 kg
- Payload mass: 3400 kg

Start of mission
- Launch date: 4 April 2019, 11:01:34 UTC
- Rocket: Soyuz-2.1a (s/n Ya15000-036)
- Launch site: Baikonur, Site 31/6
- Contractor: RKTs Progress

End of mission
- Disposal: Deorbited
- Decay date: 29 July 2019

Orbital parameters
- Reference system: Geocentric orbit
- Regime: Low Earth orbit
- Inclination: 51.67°

Docking with ISS
- Docking port: Pirs
- Docking date: 4 April 2019, 14:22:26 UTC
- Undocking date: 29 July 2019, 10:43 UTC
- Time docked: 116 days

Cargo
- Mass: 3400 kg
- Pressurised: 1400 kg
- Fuel: 900 kg
- Gaseous: 47 kg
- Water: 420 kg

Progress MS-11 (Russian: Прогресс МC-11), identified by NASA as Progress 72P, was a Progress spaceflight operated by Roscosmos to resupply the International Space Station (ISS). This was the 163rd flight of a Progress spacecraft.

== History ==
The Progress-MS is an uncrewed freighter based on the Progress-M featuring improved avionics. This improved variant first launched on 21 December 2015. It included the following improvements:

- New external compartment that enables it to deploy satellites. Each compartment can hold up to four launch containers. First installed on Progress MS-03.
- Enhanced redundancy thanks to the addition of a backup system of electrical motors for the docking and sealing mechanism.
- Improved micrometeoroid (MMOD) protection with additional panels in the cargo compartment.
- Luch Russian relay satellites link capabilities enable telemetry and control even when not in direct view of ground radio stations.
- GNSS autonomous navigation enables real time determination of the status vector and orbital parameters dispensing with the need of ground station orbit determination.
- Real time relative navigation thanks to direct radio data exchange capabilities with the space station.
- New digital radio that enables enhanced TV camera view for the docking operations.
- The Ukrainian Chezara Kvant-V on board radio system and antenna/feeder system has been replaced with a Unified Command Telemetry System (UCTS).
- Replacement of the Kurs A with Kurs NA digital system.

== Pre-launch ==
In 2014, the launch was scheduled for 16 April 2018. In November 2018, delays with the launch of the EgyptSat-A spacecraft meant that the launch was delayed to 28 March 2019, as reported by newspaper Kommersant. In January 2019, RIA Novosti reported that the launch had been pushed further back to 4 April 2019.

== Launch ==
Progress MS-11 launched on 4 April 2019, at 11:01:34 UTC from the Baikonur Cosmodrome in Kazakhstan. It used a Soyuz-2.1a rocket.

== Docking ==
Progress MS-11 docked with the docking port of the Pirs module just 3 hours and 22 minutes after the launch, at 14:22:26 UTC.

== Cargo ==
The Progress MS-11 spacecraft delivered 3,400 kg of cargo, with 1,400 kg of this being dry cargo. The following is a breakdown of cargo bound for the ISS:

- Dry cargo: 1,400 kg
- Fuel: 900 kg
- Compressed Air: 47 kg
- Water: 420 kg (Rodnik system)

Equipment for several life science experiments, including Bioplenka, Konstanta-2, Produtsent, Mikrovir, Struktura, Biodegradatsiya and Kristallizator. The spacecraft also carried the Faza vessel for growing water plants and the associated lighting system for the Ryaska educational experiment.

== Undocking and re-entry ==
Progress MS-11 undocked from the ISS at 10:43 UTC on 29 July 2019. After deorbiting, it underwent atmospheric re-entry going through the atmosphere, and its debris splashed down in the Pacific Ocean on the same day.

== See also ==
- Uncrewed spaceflights to the International Space Station
