= Progress MS-19 =

2022 Russian resupply spaceflight to the ISS

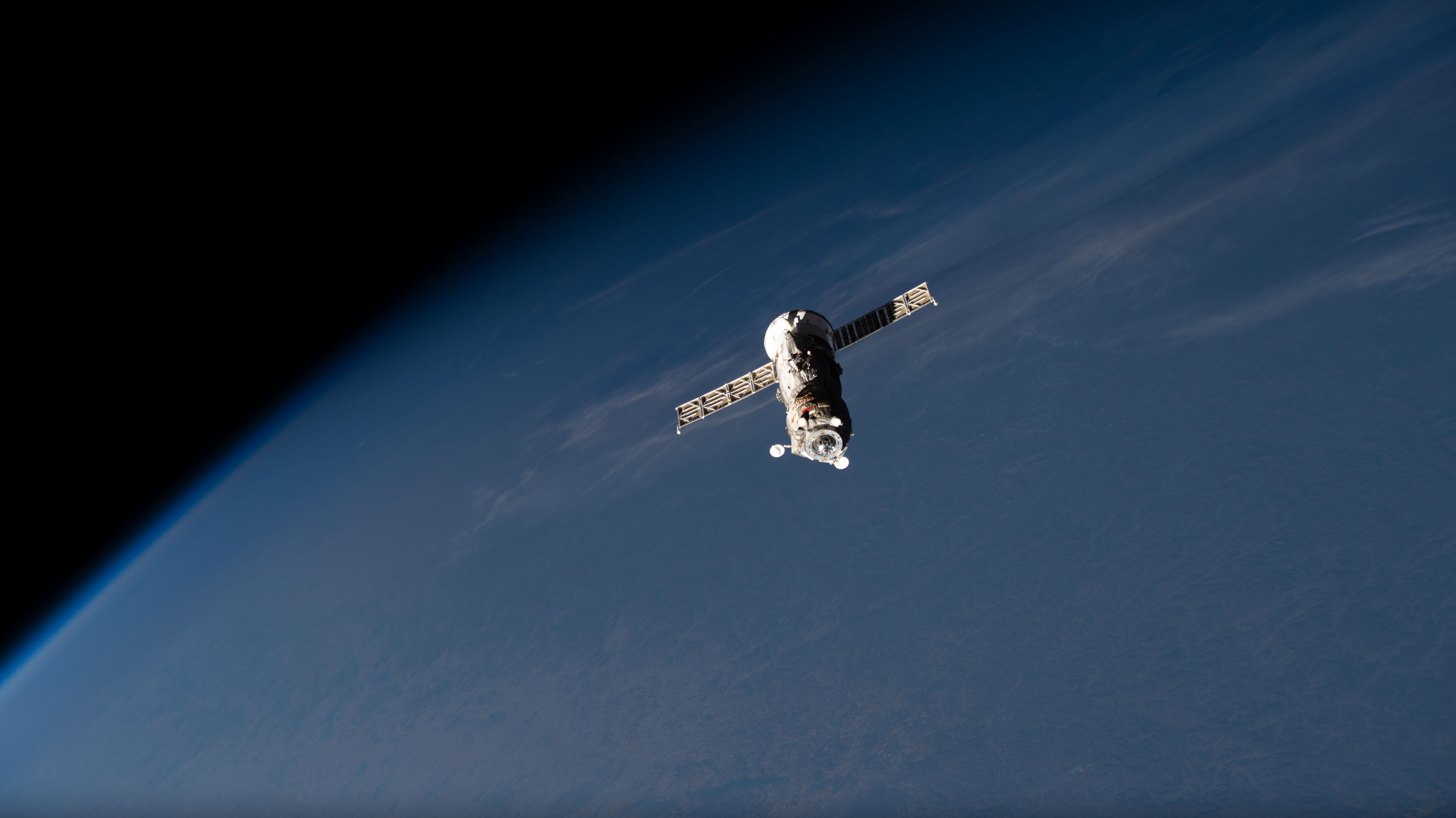
- Progress MS-19 departing the ISS
- Names: Progress 80P
- Mission type: ISS resupply
- Operator: Roscosmos
- COSPAR ID: 2022-014A
- SATCAT no.: 51660
- Mission duration: 250 days

Spacecraft properties
- Spacecraft: Progress MS-19 No.449
- Spacecraft type: Progress MS
- Manufacturer: Energia
- Launch mass: 7000 kg

Start of mission
- Launch date: 15 February 2022, 04:25:40
- Rocket: Soyuz-2.1a
- Launch site: Baikonur, Site 31/6
- Contractor: RKTs Progress

End of mission
- Disposal: Deorbited
- Decay date: 24 October 2022, 01:51 UTC

Orbital parameters
- Reference system: Geocentric orbit
- Regime: Low Earth orbit
- Inclination: 51.65°

Docking with ISS
- Docking port: Poisk zenith
- Docking date: 17 February 2022, 07:03 UTC
- Undocking date: 23 October 2022, 22:45 UTC
- Time docked: 248 days and 15 hours

Progress MS-19 (Russian: Прогресс МC-19), Russian production No.449, identified by NASA as Progress 80P, was a Progress spaceflight launched by Roscosmos to resupply the International Space Station (ISS). This was the 172nd flight of a Progress spacecraft.

== History ==
The Progress-MS is an uncrewed freighter based on the Progress-M featuring improved avionics. This improved variant first launched on 21 December 2015. It has the following improvements:

- New external compartment that enables it to deploy satellites. Each compartment can hold up to four launch containers. First time installed on Progress MS-03
- Enhanced redundancy thanks to the addition of a backup system of electrical motors for the docking and sealing mechanism
- Improved Micrometeoroid (MMOD) protection with additional panels in the cargo compartment
- Luch Russian relay satellites link capabilities enable telemetry and control even when not in direct view of ground radio stations
- GNSS autonomous navigation enables real time determination of the status vector and orbital parameters dispensing with the need of ground station orbit determination.
- Real time relative navigation thanks to direct radio data exchange capabilities with the space station
- New digital radio that enables enhanced TV camera view for the docking operations
- The Ukrainian Chezara Kvant-V on board radio system and antenna/feeder system has been replaced with a Unified Command Telemetry System (UCTS)
- Replacement of the KURS-A with KURS-NA digital system

== Launch ==
On 3 February 2021, the State Commission for Testing of the Piloted Space Systems, chaired by Roskosmos head Dmitry Rogozin, approved the latest ISS schedule for 2021 and the first quarter of 2022.

A Soyuz-2.1a launched Progress MS-19 to the International Space Station from Baikonur Site 31 on 16 February 2022 on a fast-track trajectory. Around 3 hours 20 minutes after the launch, Progress MS-19 automatically docked to the zenith (space-facing) port of the MIM2 Poisk module and continued its mission for 368 days, supporting Expedition 66 and Expedition 67 missions aboard the ISS.

== Cargo ==
The Progress MS-19 spacecraft is loaded with 2,523 kg (5,562 lb) of cargo, with 1,632 kg (3,598 lb) of this being dry cargo.

- Dry cargo: 1,632 kg (3,598 lb)
- Fuel: 431 kg (950 lb)
- Oxygen: 40 kg (88 lb)
- Water: 420 kg (930 lb)

Also delivered to ISS by progress were 6 Russian experimental cubesats (ЮЗГУ No.5 - 10 / SWSU No5 - 10), which were deployed from the ISS by Russian Cosmonaut Oleg Artemyev during EVA 3 spacewalk. See 2022 List of spacecraft deployed from the International Space Station.

== See also ==
- Uncrewed spaceflights to the International Space Station
