= Progress MS =

Latest revision of the Progress cargo spacecraft

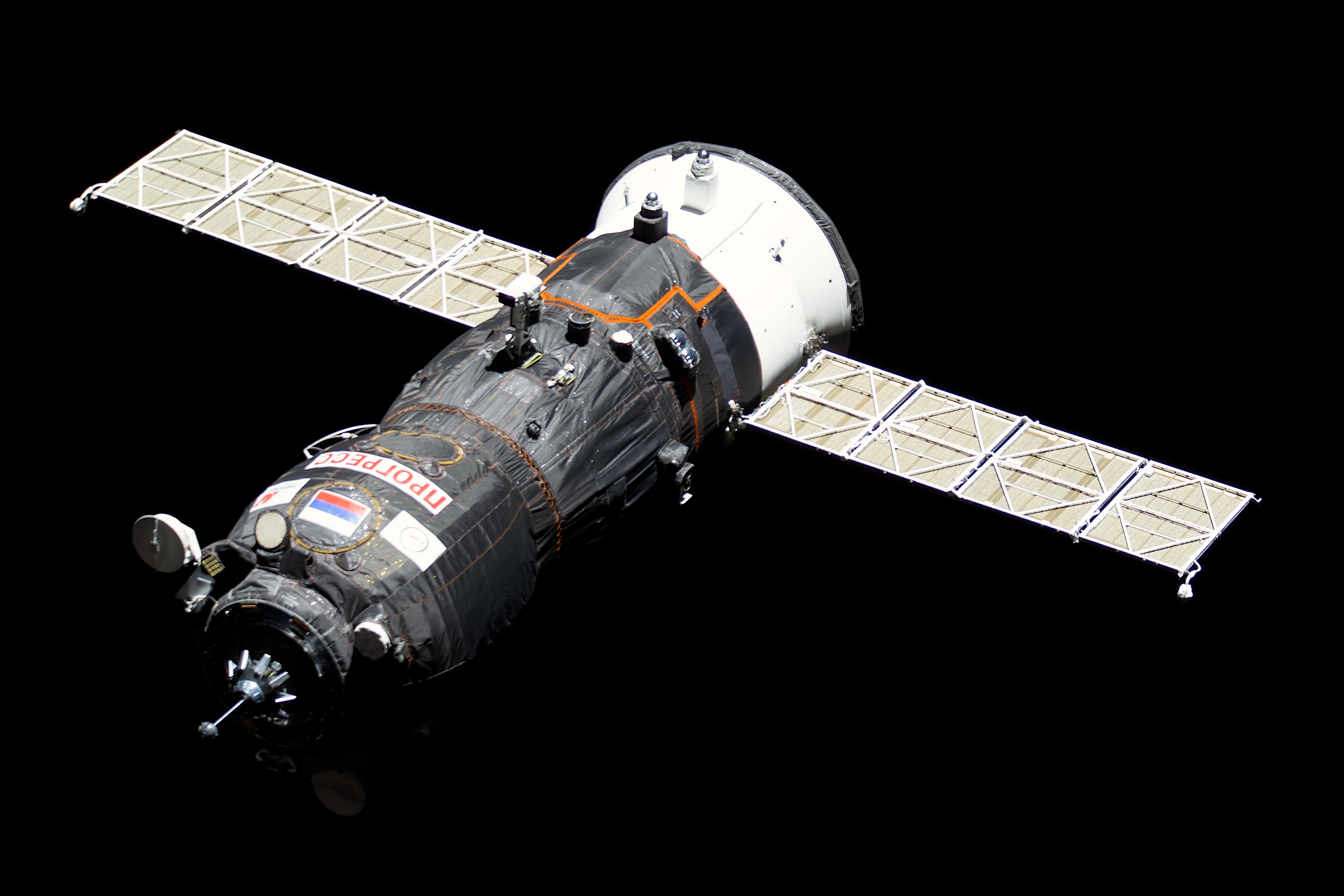
- Progress MS-11 approaching the ISS
- Manufacturer: Energia
- Country of origin: Russia
- Operator: Roscosmos
- Applications: ISS resupply

Specifications
- Spacecraft type: Cargo
- Launch mass: 7,440 kg (16,400 lb)
- Payload capacity: Launch: 2,600 kg (5,700 lb); Disposal: 2,140 kg (4,720 lb)
- Volume: 7 m^{3} (250 cu ft) in cargo section
- Regime: Low Earth orbit
- Design life: 240 days when docked to a space station (Note: Progress MS-14 remained docked more than one year.); 30 days free flight

Dimensions
- Length: 7.4 m (24 ft)
- Diameter: 2.7 m (8 ft 10 in)
- Solar array span: 10.7 m (35 ft)

Production
- Status: Active
- Launched: 33 (as of 22 March 2026)
- Operational: 2 (MS-32, MS-33)
- Retired: 30
- Lost: 1 (MS‑04)
- Maiden launch: 21 December 2015 (MS-01)

Related spacecraft
- Derived from: Progress M
- Flown with: Soyuz MS (crewed version)
- Launch vehicle: Soyuz-2.1a (2015–); Soyuz-U (2016–2017); Soyuz-FG (2018–2019)

Configuration

The Progress MS (Russian: Прогресс МС; GRAU: 11F615A61) is the latest version of the Russian Progress spacecraft series, first launched in 2015. The "MS" stands for "modernized systems", reflecting upgrades primarily focused on the communications and navigation subsystems. An evolution of the Progress M spacecraft, the Soyuz MS features minimal external changes, mainly in the placement of antennas, sensors, and thrusters. It is used by Roscosmos for cargo spaceflight missions. Progress MS-01 conducted its maiden flight on 21 December 2015, heading to the International Space Station (ISS).

== Design ==
Like earlier variants, the Progress MS spacecraft consists of three sections (from forward to aft in orbit, or top to bottom when mounted on a rocket):

- Cargo section: Based on the Soyuz orbital module, this 7-cubic-metre (250 cu ft) pressurized section carries supplies for the crew, including maintenance items, prepackaged and fresh food, scientific equipment, and clothing. Its docking drogue is similar to that of Soyuz, but with additional ducting that enables the automated transfer of fuel, water, and gases.
- Tanker section: Replacing the Soyuz reentry module, this unpressurized compartment houses tanks for unsymmetrical dimethylhydrazine (UDMH) fuel, dinitrogen tetroxide (N_{2}O_{4}) oxidizer, drinking water, and atmospheric gases. Ducts connect the tanks to transfer lines routed along the exterior of the pressurized module to connectors at the docking port, enabling automated transfer. The design is intended to prevent leaks of propellants from entering the station atmosphere. The water and gases supplement supplies generated by the Environmental Control and Life Support System.
- Instrumentation/propulsion section: Largely derived from the Soyuz instrumentation/propulsion module, this unpressurized compartment is slightly elongated to accommodate avionics normally housed in the Soyuz descent module. It contains engines used for attitude control and automated docking, and is also used to reboost the station’s orbit once docked.

Unlike Soyuz, the Progress spacecraft does not require life support systems, heat shields, parachutes, or crew escape systems and cannot be separated into multiple modules. The elimination of these systems significantly reduces the spacecraft's mass, allowing for increased cargo capacity. After completing its mission, the spacecraft is typically filled with waste, undocks, performs a controlled deorbit burn, and burns up during reentry into Earth's atmosphere.

== Specifications ==
Data from

- Launch mass: 7,440 kilograms (16,400 lb)
- Total payload capacity at launch: 2,600 kilograms (5,700 lb) – the following amounts exceed this capacity, giving planners the ability to match the payload to the needs of the station
  - Dry cargo (in cargo section): Up to 1,800 kilograms (4,000 lb) in 7 cubic metres (250 cu ft)
  - Refueling propellant (in tanker section): Up to 1,700 kilograms (3,700 lb)
  - Reboost propellant (in instrumentation/propulsion section) 250 kilograms (550 lb)
  - Water: Up to 420 kilograms (930 lb)
  - Gases: Up to 50 kilograms (110 lb)
- Total payload capacity (in cargo section) for disposal: 2,140 kilograms (4,720 lb)
- Maximum diameter: 2.7 metres (8 ft 10 in)
- Span with solar arrays: 10.7 metres (35 ft)
- Engine thrust 2,942 newtons (661 lb_{f})

== Progress MS improvements ==
The Progress MS received the following upgrades with compared to the Progress M:

- Kurs-NA rendezvous system: The Kurs-NA (Russian: Курс-Новая Активная, romanized: Kurs-Novaya Aktivnaya, meaning "Course–New Active") is an automatic docking system developed and manufactured in Russia to replace the earlier Ukrainian-built Kurs system. The change was driven in part by the need to reduce reliance on Ukrainian hardware following the deterioration of relations and armed conflict between the two countries. It also modernizes the equipment with a higher degree of computerization and addresses the obsolescence of components in the original system. The Kurs-NA is about 25 kg (55 lb) lighter, 30% smaller, and consumes 25% less power than its predecessor. It employs a single phased-array antenna in place of four older antennas, while two narrow-angle antennas were retained but repositioned toward the rear. The system also replaces the halogen headlight used for docking assistance with a brighter, more energy-efficient LED lamp.
- Unified Command and Telemetry System (EKTS, Russian: Единая Командно-Телеметрическая Система, romanized: Edinaya Komandno-Telemetricheskaya Sistema): Replaces earlier systems (BRTS, MBITS, Rassvet) with a single unit that supports satellite communications via Russia's Luch relay network, covering up to 83% of each orbit. It incorporates the Apparatus for Satellite Navigation (ASN-K, Russian: Аппаратура Спутниковой Навигации [АСН-К], romanized: Apparatura Sputnikovoi Navigatsii), which replaces a ground-based tracking network of six stations across Russia that provided only partial orbital coverage. ASN-K uses GLONASS and GPS signals through four fixed antennas, delivering positional accuracy of 5 m (16 ft) and 0.5° attitude accuracy. The spacecraft also retains VHF and UHF radios, can interface with U.S. TDRSS and European EDRS networks, and carries a COSPAS-SARSAT transponder for real-time reentry tracking.
- Additional micro-meteoroid protection: Additional anti-micro-meteoroid shielding was added to the cargo section module walls. This measure was designed to safeguard the spacecraft's most vulnerable component against the unlikely but potential threat of a meteoroid or space debris impact.
- Improved docking mechanism: The docking system received a backup electric driving mechanism.
- Digital camera system: The spacecraft utilizes a digital television camera system based on MPEG-2, replacing the older analog system. This upgrade enables space-to-space RF communication between the spacecraft and the station and reduces interference.
- CubeSat deployment platform: New external compartment that enables it to deploy CubeSats. Each compartment can hold up to four launch containers. First time installed on Progress MS-03.

== List of flights ==
List includes only completed or currently manifested missions. Dates are listed in UTC, and for future events, they are the earliest possible opportunities (also known as NET dates) and may change.

| Spacecraft | S/N | Launch | Carrier rocket | Launch pad | Docking | | | Deorbit | Remarks |
| Spacecraft | S/N | Launch | Carrier rocket | Launch pad | Port | Docking | Undocking | Deorbit | Remarks |
|---|---|---|---|---|---|---|---|---|---|
| Progress MS-01 | 431 | 21 December 2015, 08:44:39 | Soyuz‑2.1a | Site 31/6 | Pirs nadir | 23 December 2015, 10:27 | 2 July 2016, 23:48 | 3 July 2016, 07:03 | ISS-62P |
| Progress MS-02 | 432 | 31 March 2016, 16:23:57 | Soyuz-2.1a | Site 31/6 | Zvezda aft | 2 April 2016, 17:58 | 14 October 2016, 09:37 | 14 October 2016 | ISS-63P |
| Progress MS-03 | 433 | 16 July 2016, 21:41:45 | Soyuz-U | Site 31/6 | Pirs nadir | 19 July 2016, 00:20 | 31 January 2017, 14:25 | 31 January 2017, 17:34 | ISS-64P |
| Progress MS-04 | 434 | 1 December 2016, 14:51:52 | Soyuz-U | Site 1/5 | Zvezda aft | — | — | — | ISS-65P. Soyuz third stage anomaly. Vehicle lost 190 km (120 mi) over Tuva. Failed to reach orbit. |
| Progress MS-05 | 435 | 22 February 2017, 05:58:33 | Soyuz-U | Site 1/5 | Pirs nadir | 24 February 2017, 08:30 | 20 July 2017, 12:00 | 20 July 2017 | ISS-66P |
| Progress MS-06 | 436 | 14 June 2017, 09:20:13 | Soyuz-2.1a | Site 31/6 | Zvezda aft | 16 June 2017, 11:37 | 28 December 2017, 01:03 | 28 December 2017 | ISS-67P |
| Progress MS-07 | 437 | 14 October 2017, 08:47 | Soyuz-2.1a | Site 31/6 | Pirs nadir | 16 October 2017, 11:37 | 28 March 2018, 13:50 | 26 April 2018 | ISS-68P |
| Progress MS-08 | 438 | 13 February 2018, 08:13:33 | Soyuz-2.1a | Site 31/6 | Zvezda aft | 15 February 2018, 10:38 | 23 August 2018, 02:16 | 30 August 2018 | ISS-69P |
| Progress MS-09 | 439 | 9 July 2018, 21:51:33 | Soyuz-2.1a | Site 31/6 | Pirs nadir | 10 July 2018, 01:31 | 25 January 2019, 12:55 | 25 January 2019 | ISS-70P. It took just 3 hours, 40 minutes to dock the spacecraft to the ISS after the rocket's launch. |
| Progress MS-10 | 440 | 16 November 2018, 18:14:08 | Soyuz-FG | Site 31/6 | Zvezda aft | 18 November 2018, 19:28 | 4 June 2019, 08:40 | 4 June 2019 | ISS-71P |
| Progress MS-11 | 441 | 4 April 2019, 11:01:35 | Soyuz-FG | Site 31/6 | Pirs nadir | 4 April 2019, 14:25 | 29 July 2019, 10:44 | 29 July 2019 | ISS-72P |
| Progress MS-12 | 442 | 31 July 2019, 12:10:46 | Soyuz-2.1a | Site 31/6 | Pirs nadir | 31 July 2019, 15:29 | 29 November 2019, 10:25 | 29 November 2019, 14:19 | ISS-73P |
| Progress MS-13 | 443 | 6 December 2019 09:34:11 | Soyuz-2.1a | Site 31/6 | Pirs nadir | 9 December 2019, 10:35:11 | 8 July 2020, 18:22:00 | 8 July 2020, 22:05 | ISS-74P |
| Progress MS-14 | 448 | 25 April 2020, 01:51:41 | Soyuz-2.1a | Site 31/6 | Zvezda aft | 25 April 2020, 05:12:00 | 27 April 2021, 23:11:00 | 29 April 2021, 00:42 | ISS-75P |
| Progress MS-15 | 444 | 23 July 2020, 14:26:22 | Soyuz-2.1a | Site 31/6 | Pirs nadir | 23 July 17:45:00 | 9 February 2021, 05:21:00 | 9 February 2021, 09:13 | ISS-76P |
| Progress MS-16 | 445 | 15 February 2021, 04:45:06 | Soyuz-2.1a | Site 31/6 | Pirs nadir/Zvezda nadir | 17 February 2021, 06:27 | 26 July 2021, 10:55 (with Pirs) | 26 July 2021, 14:51 (with Pirs) | ISS-77P; Removed Pirs module from ISS |
| Progress MS-17 | 446 | 30 June 2021, 23:27:20 | Soyuz-2.1a | Site 31/6 | Poisk zenith | 2 July 2021, 00:59 | 20 October 2021, 23:42 | 25 November 2021, 14:34 (with docking adapter) | ISS-78P; Removed Nauka module nadir port passive docking adapter from ISS |
| Progress MS-17 | 446 | 30 June 2021, 23:27:20 | Soyuz-2.1a | Site 31/6 | Nauka nadir | 22 October 2021, 04:21 | 25 November 2021, 11:22 (with docking adapter) | 25 November 2021, 14:34 (with docking adapter) | ISS-78P; Removed Nauka module nadir port passive docking adapter from ISS |
| Progress MS-18 | 447 | 28 October 2021, 00:00:32 | Soyuz-2.1a | Site 31/6 | Zvezda aft | 30 October; 01:31:00 | 1 June 2022, 08:03 | 1 June 2022, 11:51 | ISS-79P; Delivered LCCS part of MLM Means of Attachment of Large payloads to ISS |
| Progress MS-19 | 449 | 15 February 2022, 04:25:40 | Soyuz-2.1a | Site 31/6 | Poisk zenith | 17 February 2022, 07:03:20 | 23 October 2022, 22:45:34 | 24 October 2022, 01:51 | ISS-80P |
| Progress MS-20 | 450 | 3 June 2022, 09:03 | Soyuz-2.1a | Site 31/6 | Zvezda aft | 3 June 2022, 13:02 | 7 February 2023, 05:01 | 7 February 2023, 08:37 | ISS-81P |
| Progress MS-21 | 451 | 26 October 2022, 00:20 | Soyuz-2.1a | Site 31/6 | Poisk zenith | 28 October 2022, 02:49 | 18 February 2023, 02:26 | 19 February 2023, 03:15 | ISS-82P |
| Progress MS-22 | 452 | 9 February 2023, 06:15 | Soyuz-2.1a | Site 31/6 | Zvezda aft | 11 February 2023, 08:45 | 20 August 2023, 23:50 | 21 August 2023, 02:58 | ISS-83P |
| Progress MS-23 | 453 | 24 May 2023, 12:56 | Soyuz-2.1a | Site 31/6 | Poisk zenith | 24 May 2023, 16:19 | 29 November 2023, 07:55 | 29 November 2023, 11:02 | ISS-84P |
| Progress MS-24 | 454 | 23 August 2023, 01:08 | Soyuz-2.1a | Site 31/6 | Zvezda aft | 25 August 2023, 03:50 | 13 February 2024, 02:09 | 13 February 2024, 05:16 | ISS-85P |
| Progress MS-25 | 455 | 1 December 2023, 09:25 | Soyuz-2.1a | Site 31/6 | Poisk zenith | 3 December 2023, 11:18 | 28 May 2024, 08:39 | 29 May 2024, 11:48 | ISS-86P |
| Progress MS-26 | 456 | 15 February 2024, 03:25 | Soyuz-2.1a | Site 31/6 | Zvezda aft | 17 February 2024, 06:06 | 13 August 2024, 02:00 | 13 August 2024, 05:49 | ISS-87P |
| Progress MS-27 | 457 | 30 May 2024, 09:43 | Soyuz-2.1a | Site 31/6 | Poisk zenith | 1 June 2024, 11:43 | 19 November 2024, 12:53 | 19 November 2024, 16:51 | ISS-88P |
| Progress MS-28 | 458 | 15 August 2024, 03:20:17 | Soyuz-2.1a | Site 31/6 | Zvezda aft | 17 August 2024, 05:53 | 25 February 2025, 20:17:33 | 25 February 2025, 23:23 | ISS-89P |
| Progress MS-29 | 459 | 21 November 2024, 12:22:23 | Soyuz-2.1a | Site 31/6 | Poisk zenith | 23 November 2024, 14:31 | 1 July 2025, 18:43 | 1 July 2025, 22:30 | ISS-90P |
| Progress MS-30 | 460 | 27 February 2025, 21:24:27 | Soyuz-2.1a | Site 31/6 | Zvezda aft | 1 March 2025, 23:02:30 | 9 September 2025, 15:45:30 | 9 September 2025, 19:59 | ISS-91P |
| Progress MS-31 | 461 | 3 July 2025, 19:32:40 | Soyuz-2.1a | Site 31/6 | Poisk zenith | 5 July 2025, 21:25 | 16 March 2026, 13:24 | 16 March 2026, 17:21 | ISS-92P |
| Progress MS-32 | 462 | 11 September 2025, 17:54:06 | Soyuz-2.1a | Site 31/6 | Zvezda aft | 13 September 2025, 20:23 | 20 April 2026, 22:08:30 | 21 April 2026, 02:05 | ISS-93P |
| Progress MS-33 | 463 | 22 March 2026, 11:59:51 | Soyuz-2.1a | Site 31/6 | Poisk zenith | 24 March 2026, 13:40:47 | 7 September 2026, 15:18 | 7 September 2026, 18:27 | ISS-94P; Damage to Baikonur Cosmodrome Site 31 during the Soyuz MS-28 launch delayed the mission from December 2025. A rendezvous antenna failed to deploy, requiring manual docking using the TORU control system. |
| Progress MS-34 | 464 | 25 April 2026, 22:21:47 | Soyuz-2.1a | Site 31/6 | Zvezda aft | 28 April 2026, 00:00:46 | November 2026 (planned) | November 2026 (planned) | ISS-95P |
| Progress MS-35 | 465 | 16 September 2026, 13:33 | Soyuz-2.1a | Site 31/6 | Poisk zenith | 19 September 2026, 13:44 | February 2027 (planned) | February 2027 (planned) | ISS-96P |
