= Progress MS-12 =

2019 Russian resupply spaceflight to the ISS

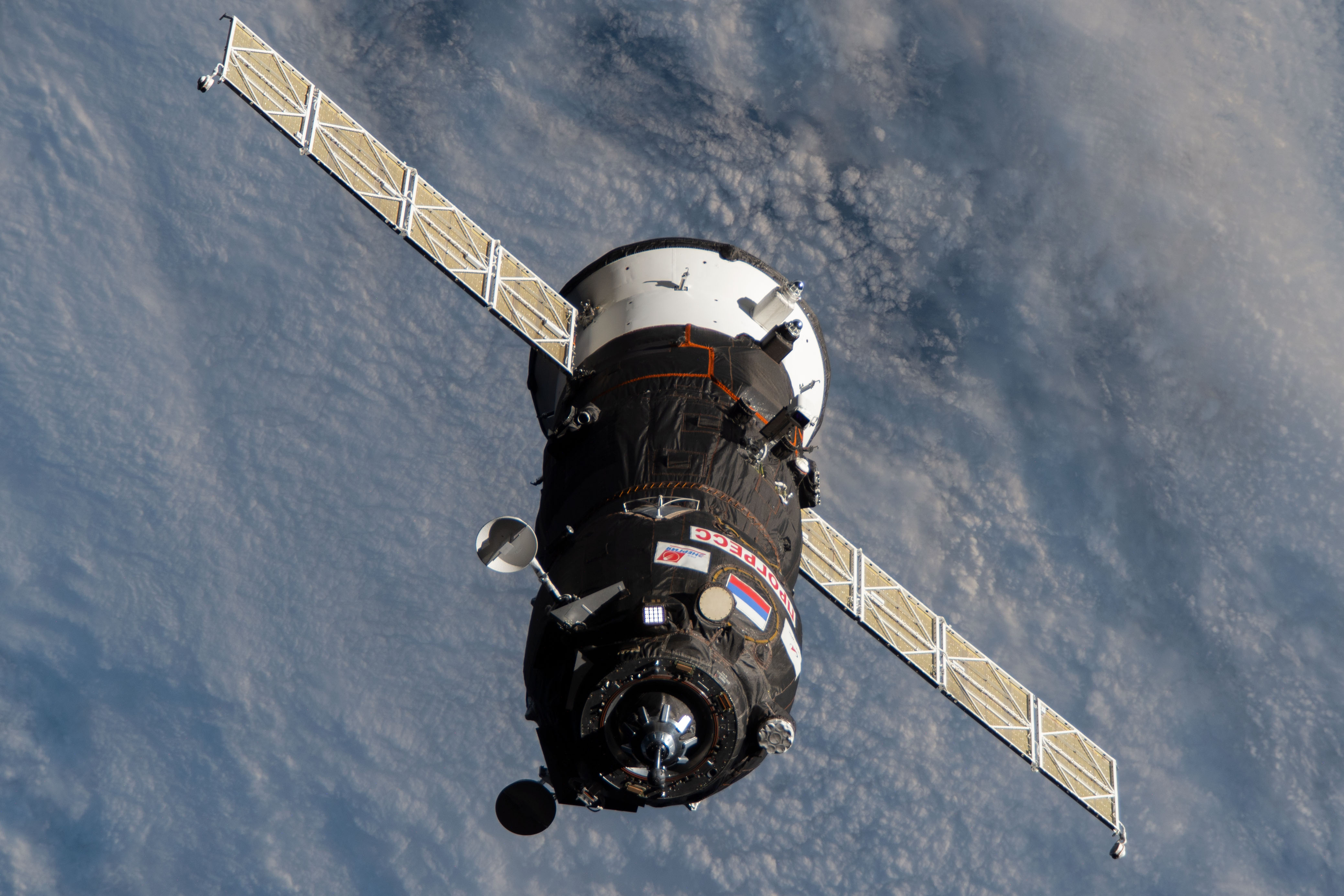
- Progress MS-12 approaches the ISS
- Names: Progress 73P
- Mission type: ISS resupply
- Operator: Roscosmos
- COSPAR ID: 2019-047A
- SATCAT no.: 44455
- Mission duration: 121 days

Spacecraft properties
- Spacecraft: Progress MS-12 s/n 442
- Spacecraft type: Progress-MS
- Manufacturer: Energia
- Launch mass: 7392 kg
- Payload mass: 3434 kg

Start of mission
- Launch date: 31 July 2019, 12:10:46 UTC
- Rocket: Soyuz-2.1a (s/n N15000-035)
- Launch site: Baikonur, Site 31/6
- Contractor: RKTs Progress

End of mission
- Disposal: Deorbited
- Decay date: 29 November 2019, 14:19 UTC

Orbital parameters
- Reference system: Geocentric orbit
- Regime: Low Earth orbit
- Inclination: 51.66°

Docking with ISS
- Docking port: Pirs
- Docking date: 31 July 2019, 15:29 UTC
- Undocking date: 29 November 2019 10:25 UTC
- Time docked: 121 days

Cargo
- Mass: 3434 kg
- Pressurised: 1164 kg
- Fuel: 850 kg
- Gaseous: 51 kg
- Water: 420 kg

Progress MS-12 (Russian: Прогресс МC-12), Russian production No.442, identified by NASA as Progress 73P, was a Progress spaceflight operated by Roscosmos to resupply the International Space Station (ISS). This was the 164th flight of a Progress spacecraft.

== History ==
The Progress-MS is an uncrewed freighter based on the Progress-M featuring improved avionics. This improved variant first launched on 21 December 2015. It has the following improvements:

- New external compartment that enables it to deploy satellites. Each compartment can hold up to four launch containers. First time installed on Progress MS-03.
- Enhanced redundancy thanks to the addition of a backup system of electrical motors for the docking and sealing mechanism.
- Improved Micrometeoroid (MMOD) protection with additional panels in the cargo compartment.
- Luch Russian relay satellites link capabilities enable telemetry and control even when not in direct view of ground radio stations.
- GNSS autonomous navigation enables real time determination of the status vector and orbital parameters dispensing with the need of ground station orbit determination.
- Real time relative navigation thanks to direct radio data exchange capabilities with the space station.
- New digital radio that enables enhanced TV camera view for the docking operations.
- The Ukrainian Chezara Kvant-V on board radio system and antenna/feeder system has been replaced with a Unified Command Telemetry System (UCTS).
- Replacement of the Kurs A with Kurs NA digital system.

== Pre-launch ==
In 2014, the launch was planned for 1 July 2018, rescheduled for 5 June 2019 and rescheduled to 31 July 2019. The liftoff had been initially set for the two-day rendezvous profile with the station, but the launch time was later shifted to enable a two-orbit (three-hour) flight to the station.

== Launch ==
Progress MS-12 was launched on 31 July 2019, at 12:10:46 UTC from Baikonur Cosmodrome in Kazakhstan, using a Soyuz-2.1a rocket.

== Docking ==
Progress MS-12 docked with the Pirs docking module. The docking took place 3 hours 18 minutes 31 seconds into the mission (a new record time).

== Cargo ==
The Progress MS-12 spacecraft delivered 1,164 kg (2,566 lb) of dry cargo (in the cargo compartment).

- 420 kg (930 lb) of water (in the Rodnik-system tanks)
- 51 kg (112 lb) of oxygen (in pressurized bottles)
- 850 kg (1,870 lb) of propellant in the refueling section
- 880 kg (1,940 lb) of propellant in the integrated propulsion system to the International Space Station.

The dry cargo consisted of:

- 394 kg (869 lb) of hardware for onboard systems
- 27 kg (60 lb) of medical supplies
- 1 kg (2.2 lb) of personal protective gear
- 190 kg (420 lb) of hygiene items
- 7 kg (15 lb) of repairs and servicing equipment
- 20 kg (44 lb) of means of crew support
- 282 kg (622 lb) of food
- 13 kg (29 lb) of payloads
- 38 kg (84 lb) of structural components and other hardware
- 192 kg (423 lb) of NASA cargo.

== Undocking and decay ==
The Progress MS-12 craft undocked from ISS on 29 November 2019 at 10:25 UTC, initiated braking maneuver at 13:39 UTC, re-entered Earth's atmosphere at 14:11 UTC (end of mission), with any remaining debris impacting a remote part of Pacific Ocean at 14:19 UTC.

== See also ==
- Uncrewed spaceflights to the International Space Station
