= Progress MS-22 =

2023 Russian resupply spaceflight to the ISS

- Names: Progress 83P
- Mission type: ISS resupply
- Operator: Roscosmos
- COSPAR ID: 2023-018A
- SATCAT no.: 55560
- Mission duration: 192 days, 20 hours and 43 minutes

Spacecraft properties
- Spacecraft: Progress MS-22 no.452
- Spacecraft type: Progress MS
- Manufacturer: Energia
- Launch mass: 7000 kg

Start of mission
- Launch date: 9 February 2023, 06:15:36
- Rocket: Soyuz-2.1a
- Launch site: Baikonur, Site 31/6
- Contractor: RKTs Progress

End of mission
- Disposal: Deorbited
- Decay date: 21 August 2023, 02:58 UTC

Orbital parameters
- Reference system: Geocentric orbit
- Regime: Low Earth orbit
- Inclination: 51.65°

Docking with ISS
- Docking port: Zvezda aft
- Docking date: 11 February 2023, 08:45 UTC
- Undocking date: 20 August 2023, 23:50 UTC
- Time docked: 190 days, 15 hours and 5 minutes

Progress MS-22 (Russian: Прогресс МC-22), Russian production No.452, identified by NASA as Progress 83P, is a Progress spaceflight launched by Roscosmos to resupply the International Space Station (ISS). It is the 175th flight of a Progress spacecraft.

== History ==
The Progress-MS is an uncrewed freighter based on the Progress-M featuring improved avionics. This improved variant first launched on 21 December 2015. It has the following improvements:

- New external compartment that enables it to deploy satellites. Each compartment can hold up to four launch containers. First time installed on Progress MS-03.
- Enhanced redundancy thanks to the addition of a backup system of electrical motors for the docking and sealing mechanism.
- Improved Micrometeoroid (MMOD) protection with additional panels in the cargo compartment.
- Luch Russian relay satellites link capabilities enable telemetry and control even when not in direct view of ground radio stations.
- GNSS autonomous navigation enables real time determination of the status vector and orbital parameters dispensing with the need of ground station orbit determination.
- Real time relative navigation thanks to direct radio data exchange capabilities with the space station.
- New digital radio that enables enhanced TV camera view for the docking operations.
- Unified Command Telemetry System (UCTS) replaces previous Ukrainian Chezara Kvant-V as the Progress spacecraft's on-board radio and antenna/feeder system.
- Replacement of the Kurs A with Kurs NA digital system.

== Launch ==
A Soyuz-2.1a launched Progress MS-22 to the International Space Station from Baikonur Site 31 on 9 February 2023. Around 2 days after the launch, Progress MS-22 automatically docked with Zvezda, supporting Expedition 69 aboard the ISS.

== Cargo ==
The MS-22 cargo capacity is around 2,500 kg (5,500 lb) as follows:

- Dry cargo: 1,319 kg (2,908 lb)
- Fuel: 709 kg (1,563 lb)
- Compressed air: 40 kg (88 lb)
- Water: 420 kg (930 lb)

== See also ==
- Uncrewed spaceflights to the International Space Station
