= TGK PG =

- Manufacturer: RSC Energia
- Country of origin: Russia
- Operator: Roscosmos
- Applications: Space station resupply

Specifications
- Spacecraft type: Automated cargo spacecraft
- Launch mass: 8,180 kg (18,030 lb)
- Payload capacity: 3,400 kg (7,500 lb)
- Volume: 18 m^{3} (640 cu ft)

Production
- Status: Proposal
- Maiden launch: post 2020 (planned)

Related spacecraft
- Derived from: Progress-MS & Orel

TGK PG (Russian: Транспортный Грузовой Корабль Повышенной Грузоподъемности (ТГК ПГ), lit. 'Cargo vehicle with increased payload capacity') is an automated cargo spacecraft project to replace Progress-MS as the Russian logistic vehicle to the ISS. It was requested for development to take advantage of the increased lift capacity of the Soyuz-2.1b. The initial development contract was awarded to RSC Energia by Roscosmos on December 11, 2015. The spacecraft is not expected to fly before 2020.

== Spacecraft description ==
Born out of the need to reduce the flights to the ISS from 2018 onward, it was designed as a radical departure from the Progress design. It would incorporate concepts and technologies developed from the Orel and Progress-MS projects. One critical characteristic would be a 370 days on-orbit design life, compared to the 210 days of the Progress and Soyuz. This would allow less ships to be launched per year while maintaining a full complement on the station. It would consist of a service module on the aft, an unpressurized propellant cluster of six tanks on the center, a pressurized module with docking adapter on the fore and a truss structure connecting all the parts. It would use the reaction control system of the Progress-MS and an orbital manoeuvring rocket engine already developed for another spacecraft. The new design would have a single deposit of propellant that could be used by the spacecraft or to refuel the space station.

== See also ==
- Comparison of space station cargo vehicles
  - Progress spacecraft – an expendable cargo vehicle currently in use by the Russian Federal Space Agency
  - Automated Transfer Vehicle – a retired expendable cargo vehicle used by the ESA
  - Cygnus spacecraft – an expendable cargo vehicle developed by Orbital Sciences Corporation under American CRS program, currently in use.
  - H-II Transfer Vehicle – a retired expendable cargo vehicle used by JAXA
  - Dragon 2 cargo spacecraft - a reusable cargo vehicle developed by SpaceX, under American CRS program, currently in use.
  - Dream Chaser Cargo System - a cargo variant of the reusable SNC's spaceplane
