= Progress MS-01 =

2015 Russian resupply spaceflight to the ISS

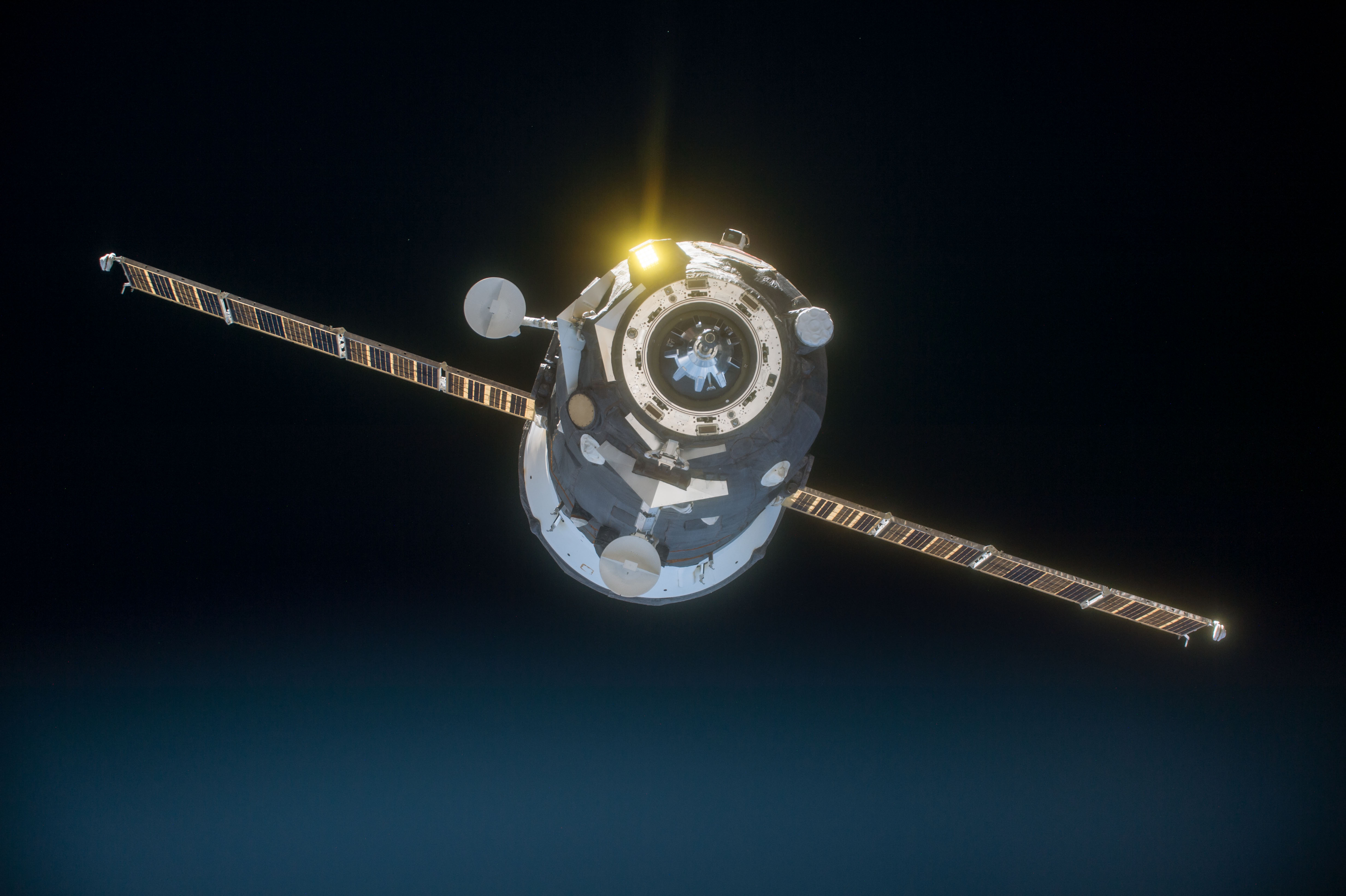
- Progress MS-01 undocking and redocking test
- Names: Progress 62; ISS 62P
- Mission type: ISS resupply
- Operator: Roscosmos
- COSPAR ID: 2015-080A
- SATCAT no.: 41177
- Mission duration: 194 days, 23 hours and 5 minutes

Spacecraft properties
- Spacecraft: Progress MS-01 No. 431
- Spacecraft type: Progress MS
- Manufacturer: Energia
- Launch mass: 7,284 kg (16,058 lb)
- Payload mass: 2,436 kg (5,370 lb)

Start of mission
- Launch date: 21 December 2015, 08:44:39 UTC
- Rocket: Soyuz-2.1a (S/N R15000-026)
- Launch site: Baikonur, Site 31/6
- Contractor: RKTs Progress

End of mission
- Disposal: Deorbited
- Decay date: 3 July 2016, 07:50 UTC

Orbital parameters
- Reference system: Geocentric orbit
- Regime: Low Earth orbit
- Inclination: 51.66°

Docking with ISS
- Docking port: Pirs nadir
- Docking date: 23 December 2015, 10:27:02 UTC
- Undocking date: 1 July 2016, 5:36 UTC
- Time docked: 190 days, 19 hours and 9 minutes

Redocking with ISS
- Redocking port: Pirs nadir
- Redocking date: 1 July 2016, 06:04 UTC
- Unredocking date: 2 July 2016, 23:48 UTC
- Time redocked: 1 day, 17 hours and 44 minutes

Cargo
- Mass: 2,436 kg (5,370 lb)
- Pressurised: 1,252 kg (2,760 lb)
- Fuel: 718 kg (1,583 lb)
- Gaseous: 46 kg (101 lb)
- Water: 420 kg (930 lb)

Progress MS-01 (Russian: Прогресс МС-01), identified by NASA as Progress 62P was a Progress spaceflight operated by Roscosmos to resupply the International Space Station (ISS) in 2015. It was launched on 21 December 2015, to deliver cargo to the ISS. Progress MS-01 is the first vehicle in the Progress-MS series.

== History ==
The Russian Progress is an uncrewed cargo resupply spacecraft that is largely based on the crewed Soyuz. It is used to resupply Space Stations and was used for the Russian Salyut and Mir space stations as well as the International Space Station that receives three or four Progress flights a year.

== Spacecraft ==
Progress MS represents the latest generation of Progress spacecraft introduced in late 2015 in an upgrade (Article 11F615A61) from the Progress M-xxM spacecraft (Article 11F615A60) that was inaugurated back in November 2008, succeeding in the Progress M configuration flown since 1989. This latest update in the line of Progress spacecraft, also to be introduced on the crewed Soyuz craft, is largely focused on communications and navigation systems that are upgraded using modern electronics. Progress MS introduces a new KURS navigation system, a new radio, the use of GPS / GLONASS for navigation, and the use of a proximity communications link for relative navigation. After launch, ground controllers were able to communicate the Progress MS-01 via a Russian Luch data relay satellite in geosynchronous orbit. This was described as the first time a Progress or Soyuz spacecraft had such capability. These changes will not significantly change the external appearance of the Progress except for the number of deployable antennas present on the spacecraft and beginning with the third cargo ship (No.433), each Progress MS spacecraft can carry up to four containers for launching up to 24 CubeSats for deployment.

Progress MS has been designed to launch atop the upgraded Soyuz 2.1a launch vehicle that will allow the craft to carry a greater cargo upmass to the International Space Station. The spacecraft is still compatible with the Soyuz-U rocket that is being phased out in a soft transition to the newer version, alternating flights between the two to iron out any problems with no significant interruption of the supply chain to International Space Station (ISS). Progress spacecraft can dock to any port on the Russian Orbital Segment (ROS) of the International Space Station, but usually use the Pirs docking compartment and the aft docking port on the Zvezda service module.

Once docked and secured in place, the hatch to the pressurized cargo carrier can be opened by the crew to unload the cargo. Because it is crewed in orbit (crew members can enter the spacecraft), Progress is classified as a crewed spacecraft, although it is launched without a crew. During its stay at the Space Station, all cargo is transferred to ISS. This includes dry cargo that is transferred by the crew, water that is also transferred internally, oxygen, and nitrogen gas that is released to repressurize the station's atmosphere and propellant which is transferred via a dedicated transfer system being fed to tanks on the Russian Orbital Segment (ROS).

Afterward, Progress is loaded with trash and no-longer-needed items before the hatch is closed and the spacecraft undocks. Progress does not have a heat shield and makes a targeted, destructive re-entry to end its mission.

== Launch ==
The launch was initially scheduled for 21 November 2015. Progress MS-01 was launched on 21 December 2015 at 08:44:39 UTC from the Baikonur Cosmodrome in Kazakhstan. The launch vehicle was Soyuz-2.1a, the first launch of the rocket since the failed launch of Progress M-27M. The Soyuz-U rocket was used for subsequent Progress flights until this flight. Reentry of the upper stage was visible over Arizona and Nevada on 22 December 2015 around 05:15 UTC.

== Docking ==
Progress MS-01 docked with the Pirs docking compartment on 23 December 2015 at 10:27 UTC. The docking occurred without available backup control system due to TORU communication issues.

== Manual control exercise and redocking ==
On 1 July 2016 Progress MS-01 was briefly undocked to perform a test of the TORU manual control system. The goal was to validate and certify software and hardware upgrades on the MS series of the vehicle. After undocking at 5:36 UTC, the spacecraft moved 190 metres (620 ft) away from the station. Alexey Ovchinin then manually flew Progress back to the port with capture occurring at 6:05 UTC. During the docking an incorrect firing of the thrusters to lead oscillations of the spacecraft around the docking module. After they dissipated, hard docking was performed. The hatches of the spacecraft remained closed as the final undocking was expected one day later.

== Undocking and reentry ==
Progress MS-01 undocked from the ISS on 3 July 2016 at 3:48 UTC. The spacecraft initiated the deorbit maneuver on 3 July 2016 at 07:03 UTC, with an expected landing of any possible debris on the Pacific Ocean by 07:50 UTC.
