= Progress MS-02 =

2016 Russian resupply spaceflight to the ISS

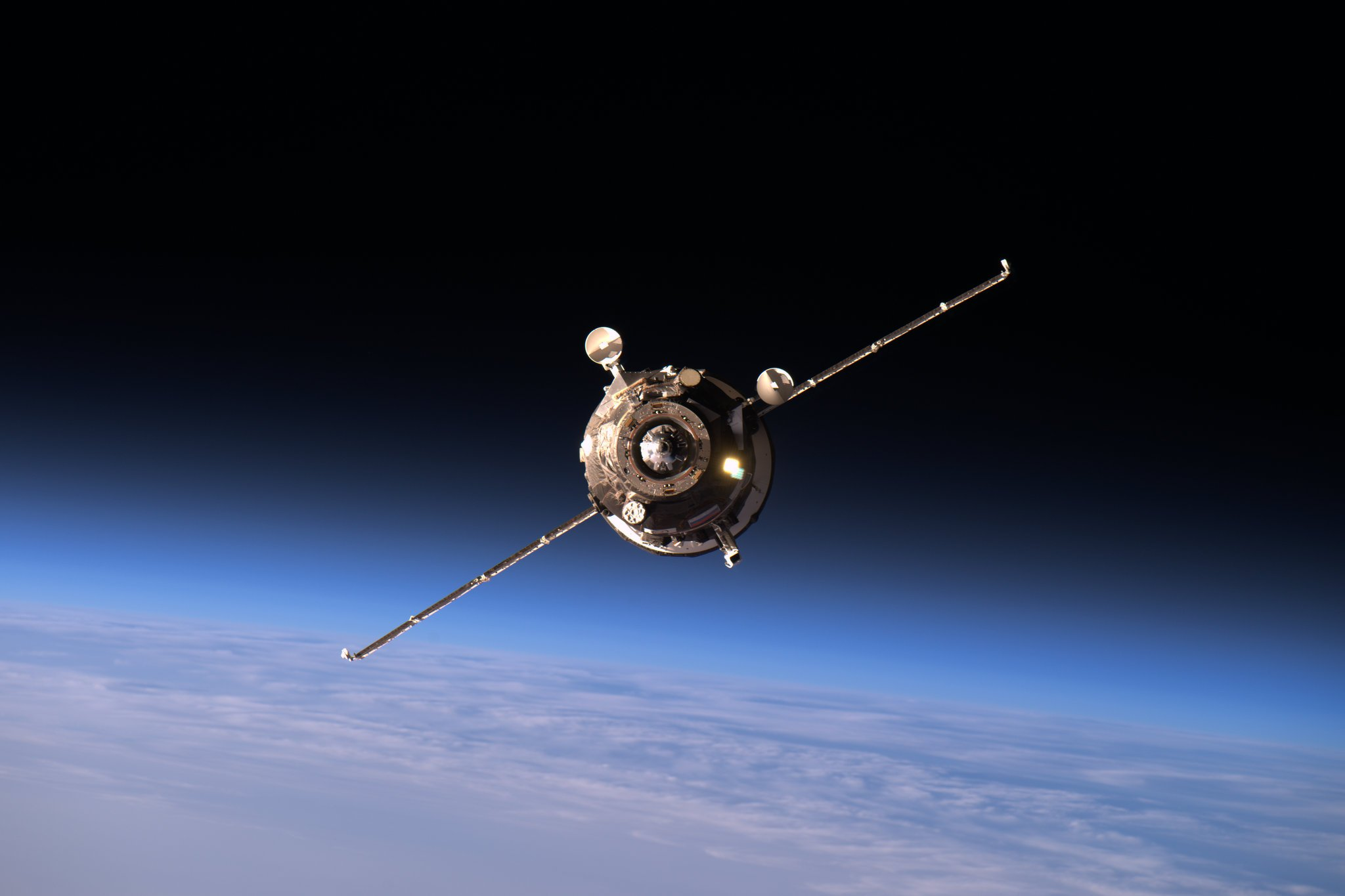
- Progress MS-02 approaching the ISS
- Names: Progress 63P
- Mission type: ISS resupply
- Operator: Roscosmos
- COSPAR ID: 2016-022A
- SATCAT no.: 41436
- Mission duration: 197 days

Spacecraft properties
- Spacecraft type: Progress-MS s/n 432
- Manufacturer: Energia

Start of mission
- Launch date: 31 March 2016, 16:23:57 UTC
- Rocket: Soyuz-2.1a (s/n R15000-023)
- Launch site: Baikonur, Site 31/6
- Contractor: RKTs Progress

End of mission
- Disposal: Deorbited
- Decay date: 14 October 2016

Orbital parameters
- Reference system: Geocentric orbit
- Regime: Low Earth orbit
- Inclination: 51.66°

Docking with ISS
- Docking port: Zvezda
- Docking date: 2 April 2016, 17:58 UTC
- Undocking date: 14 October 2016, 09:37 UTC
- Time docked: 195 days

Payload
- Tomsk-TPU 120 (amateur satellite)
- Mass: 2425 kg
- Pressurised: 1418 kg (dry cargo)
- Fuel: 540 kg
- Gaseous: 47 kg (oxygen and air)
- Water: 420 kg

Progress MS-02 (Russian: Прогресс МC-02), identified by NASA as Progress 63P, was a Progress spaceflight operated by Roscosmos to resupply the International Space Station (ISS) in 2016. It was launched to deliver cargo to the ISS.

== Technologies ==
The Progress MS spacecraft has upgraded communications and electronics from previous Progress vehicles. After launch, ground controllers were able to communicate the Progress MS-02 via a Russian Luch data relay satellite in geosynchronous orbit. This was described as the first time a Progress or Soyuz spacecraft had such capability.

Other upgrades include:

- Upgraded Kurs-A rendezvous system designated Kurs-NA, including new antennas
- Upgraded flight control system that can take advantage of the GLONASS navigation satellites for the first time, for autonomous trajectory measurements
- New digital television system, which replaced an older analog TV, allowing transmission between the transport ship and the space station via onboard radio channels.
- New digital backup control unit
- Enhanced meteoroid shielding
- New LED-based lighting system
- Upgraded angular velocity sensors
- Docking port equipped with a backup electric driving mechanism

== Launch ==
Progress MS-02 was launched on 31 March 2016 at 16:23:57 UTC from the Baikonur Cosmodrome in Kazakhstan.

== Docking ==
Progress MS-02 docked successfully with the aft docking port of the Zvezda module on 2 April 2016 at 17:58 UTC.

== Cargo ==
The Progress MS-02 spacecraft carried 2425 kg of cargo and supplies to the International Space Station. The spacecraft delivered food, fuel and supplies, including 540 kg of propellant, 47 kg of oxygen and air, 420 kg of water, and 1418 kg of spare parts, supplies and experiment hardware for the six members of the Expedition 47 crew.

Also was delivered amateur satellite Tomsk-TPU 120 (1998-067MZ) built by the Tomsk Polytechnic University. The satellite is based on the 3U CubeSat standard and was constructed with using 3D printing technology. The satellite's size is 30 by 10 cm, weight is 5 kg. Release of Tomsk-TPU 120 was made by hand during a spacewalk on 17 August 2017. The satellite will broadcast congratulations on the 120th anniversary of the Tomsk Polytechnic University, recorded by students on 11 languages and will be operate on 437.025 MHz downlink.
