= Progress M-21M =

Russian cargo spacecraft

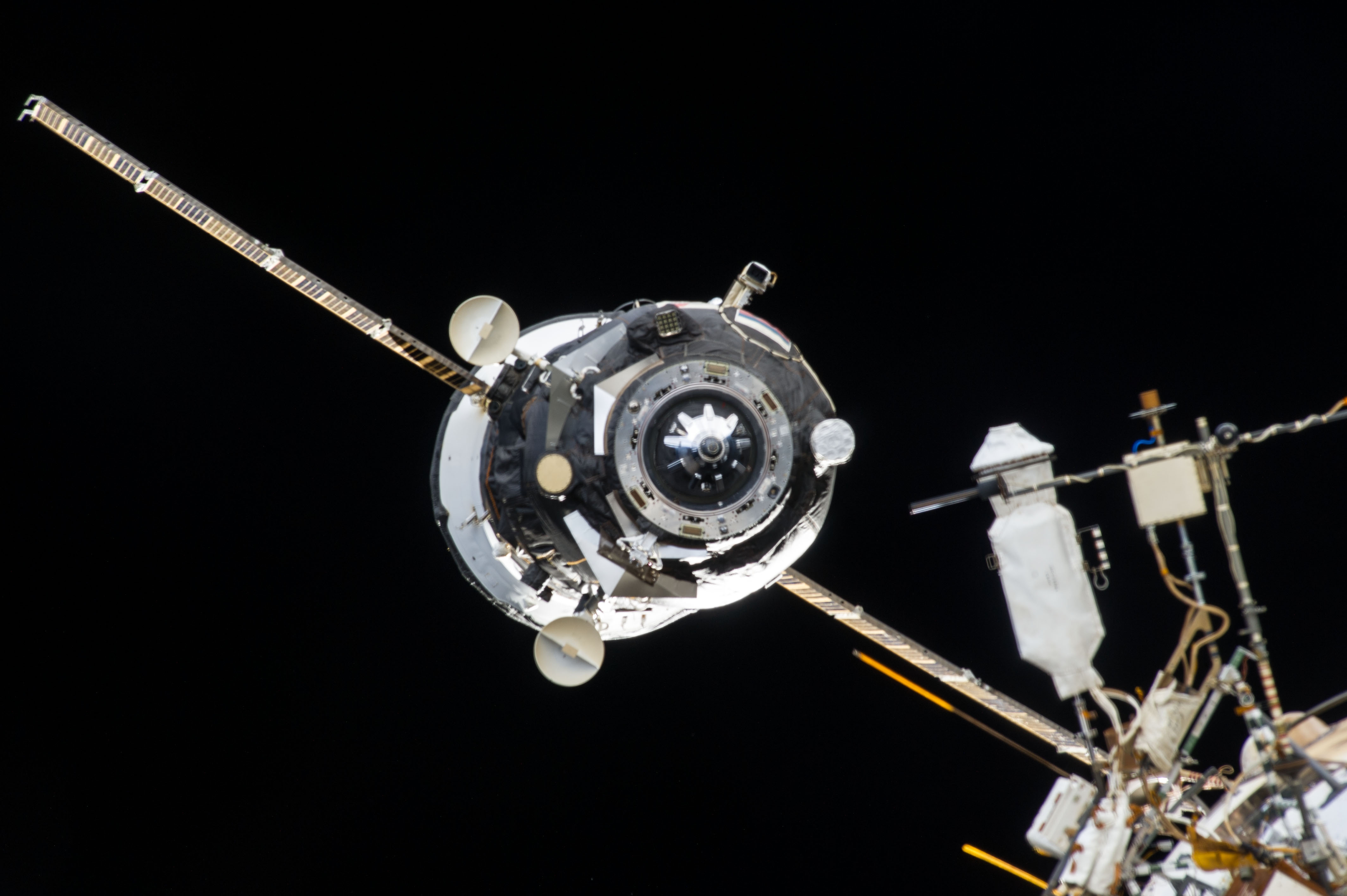
- Progress M-21M undocking from the ISS during the 2nd Kurs system test on 23 April 2014.
- Mission type: ISS resupply
- Operator: Roskosmos
- COSPAR ID: 39456
- SATCAT no.: 2013-069A
- Mission duration: 196 days

Spacecraft properties
- Spacecraft type: Progress-M s/n 421
- Manufacturer: RKK Energia
- Launch mass: 7250 kg

Start of mission
- Launch date: 25 November 2013, 20:53:06 UTC
- Rocket: Soyuz-U
- Launch site: Baikonur, Site 31/6

End of mission
- Disposal: Deorbited
- Decay date: 9 June 2014, 17:23 UTC

Orbital parameters
- Reference system: Geocentric
- Regime: Low Earth
- Inclination: 51.6°
- Epoch: 25 November 2013

Docking with ISS
- Docking port: Zvezda aft
- Docking date: 29 November 2013, 22:30:20 UTC
- Undocking date: 23 April 2014, 08:58 UTC
- Time docked: 145 days

Docking with ISS
- Docking port: Zvezda aft
- Docking date: 25 April 2014, 12:13 UTC
- Undocking date: 9 June 2014, 13:29 UTC
- Time docked: 45 days

Cargo
- Mass: 2398 kg
- Progress ISS Resupply

Progress M-21M (Russian: Прогресс М-21М), identified by NASA as Progress 53P, was a Progress spacecraft used by Roskosmos to resupply the International Space Station (ISS) during 2013. Progress M-21M was built by RKK Energia.

== Launch ==
The spacecraft was launched on time at 20:53:06 UTC on 25 November 2013 from the Baikonur Cosmodrome in Kazakhstan.

== Docking ==
The Kurs-NA docking system was tested by Progress M-21M during a fly-by of the ISS on 28 November 2013. Progress M-21M later docked with the ISS on 29 November 2013 at 22:30:20 UTC.

== Cargo ==
Progress M-21M delivers goods to the ISS, as fuel components, water, service equipment, equipment for scientific experiments, containers with food, and parcels for the crew. The total mass of all delivered goods is 2398 pounds.

== Orbit change ==
On 13 March 2014, Progress M-21M was used to raise the orbit of the ISS by "two kilometers" after an engine burn of "almost ten minutes".

== Kurs-NA docking system re-test ==
Due to problems with the Kurs-NA docking system during the last test in November 2013, another test with the system was successfully done during a two-day free flying period in April 2014. Progress M-21M undocked from the Zvezda module at 08:58 UTC on 23 April 2014 and was guided back to the same docking port two days later, docking at 12:13 UTC on 25 April 2014.

== Undocking and reentry ==
Progress M-21M undocked from the ISS on 9 June 2014 at 13:29 UTC and was deorbited the same day at 17:23 UTC.
