= Progress MS-03 =

2016 Russian resupply spaceflight to the ISS

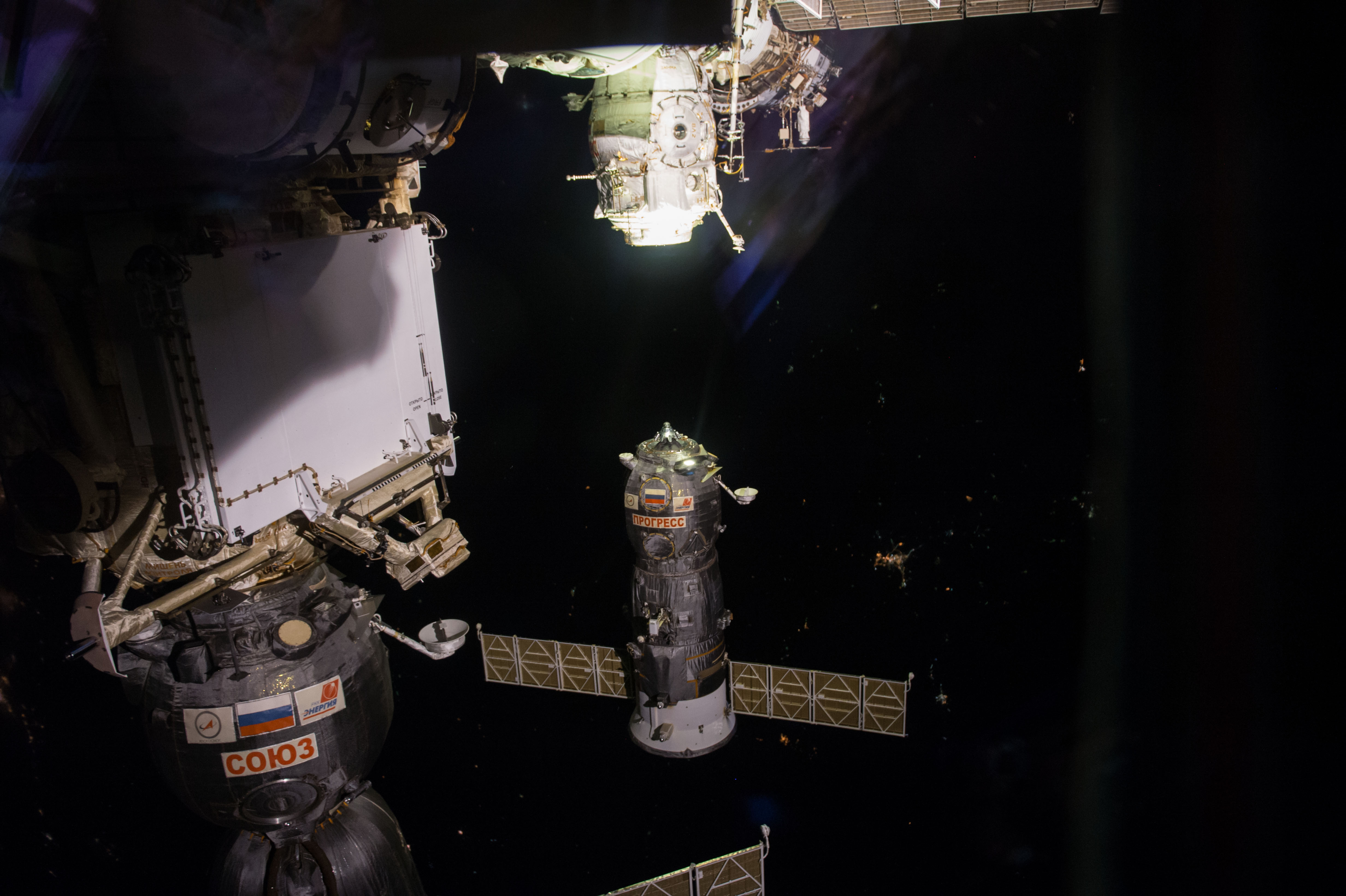
- Progress MS-03 undocking from the Pirs on 31 January 2017
- Names: Progress 64P
- Mission type: ISS resupply
- Operator: Roscosmos
- COSPAR ID: 2016-045A
- SATCAT no.: 41670
- Mission duration: 199 days

Spacecraft properties
- Spacecraft: Progress MS-03 s/n 433
- Spacecraft type: Progress-MS
- Manufacturer: Energia
- Launch mass: 7281 kg
- Payload mass: 2425 kg

Start of mission
- Launch date: 16 July 2016, 21:41:45 UTC
- Rocket: Soyuz-U (s/n G15000-147)
- Launch site: Baikonur, Site 31/6
- Contractor: RKTs Progress

End of mission
- Disposal: Deorbited
- Decay date: 31 January 2017

Orbital parameters
- Reference system: Geocentric orbit
- Regime: Low Earth orbit
- Inclination: 51.65°

Docking with ISS
- Docking port: Pirs
- Docking date: 19 July 2016, 00:20 UTC
- Undocking date: 31 January 2017, 14:25 UTC
- Time docked: 196 days

Cargo
- Mass: 2425 kg
- Pressurised: 1230 kg
- Fuel: 705 kg
- Gaseous: 50 kg
- Water: 420 kg

Progress MS-03 (Russian: Прогресс МC-03), identified by NASA as Progress 64P, was a Progress spaceflight operated by Roscosmos to resupply the International Space Station (ISS). It was the first Progress MS to have an external compartment for releasing satellites.

== History ==
Progress was the first cargo spacecraft to fly in space (1978), and also the first to bring freight back to Earth, thanks to a Raduga capsule. It was developed to supply the Salyut 6 space station and which was subsequently supply the crews of Salyut 7, Mir and from the International Space Station. It enabled space station crews to stay in space by bringing consumables (food, water, fuel, oxygen) and spare parts.

The Progress-MS is a uncrewed freighter based on the Progress-M featuring improved avionics. This improved variant first launched on 21 December 2015. It has the following improvements:

- New external compartment that enables it to deploy satellites. Each compartment can hold up to four launch containers. This Progress MS-03 flight features first usage.
- Enhanced redundancy thanks to the addition of a backup system of electrical motors for the docking and sealing mechanism.
- Improved Micrometeoroid (MMOD) protection with additional panels in the cargo compartment.
- Luch Russian relay satellites link capabilities enable telemetry and control even when not in direct view of ground radio stations.
- GNSS autonomous navigation enables real time determination of the status vector and orbital parameters dispensing with the need of ground station orbit determination.
- Real time relative navigation thanks to direct radio data exchange capabilities with the space station.
- New digital radio that enables enhanced TV camera view for the docking operations.
- The Ukrainian Chezara Kvant-V on board radio system and antenna/feeder system has been replaced with a Unified Command Telemetry System (UCTS).
- Replacement of the Kurs A with Kurs NA digital system.

== Pre-launch ==
The launch of Progress MS-03 was originally scheduled for on 30 April 2016, but was postponed as a result of an overall reshuffle of the flight manifest for the International Space Station. At the beginning of June 2016, the mission was rescheduled from 4 July to 17 July 2016.

== Launch ==
Progress MS-03 was launched on 16 July 2016 at 21:41:45 (UTC) on a Soyuz-U from the Baikonur Site 31/6 in Kazakhstan. At the time of launch, the International Space Station was flying at 420 km over Eastern Chad.

== Docking ==
The Progress MS-03 mission used the two-day, 34-orbit trip to the station instead of the currently available six-hour rendezvous profile. Progress MS-03 docked with the nadir docking port of the Pirs module on 19 July 2016 at 00:20 UTC.

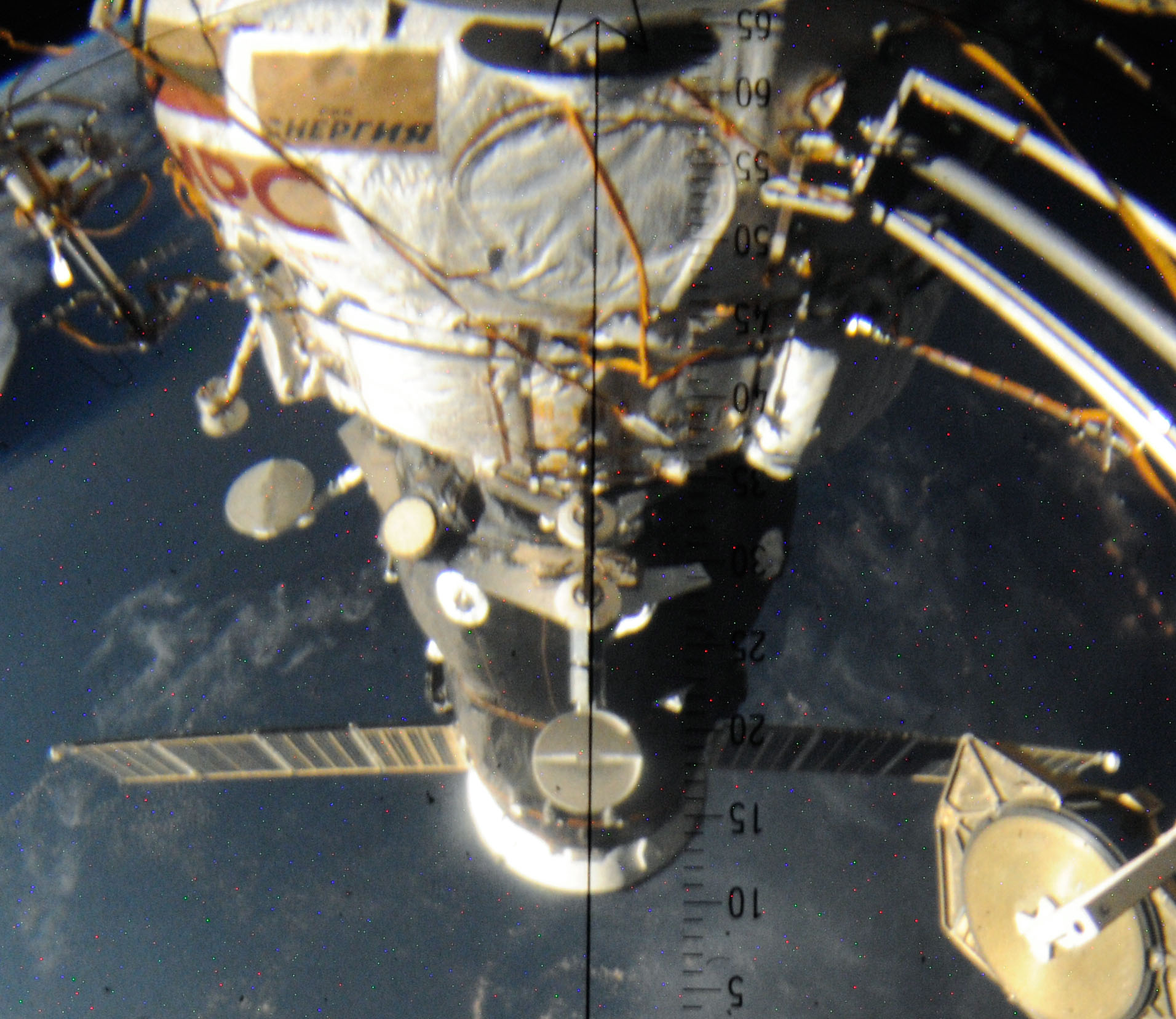
Progress MS-03 as seen from the visual scope of the Pirs module at the ISS.

== Cargo ==
The Progress MS-03 spacecraft delivered 2,425 kg of cargo and supplies to the International Space Station for the six members of the Expedition 48 crew. The following is a breakdown of cargo bound for the ISS:

- Fuel: 705 kg
- Oxygen and Air: 50 kg
- Water: 420 kg
- Supplies for NASA: 22 kg
- Spare parts: 1,230 kg

== Undocking and decay ==
The Progress MS-03 cargo ship undocked from the Pirs, on 31 January 2017, at 14:25 UTC, Roskosmos announced. The three-minute braking maneuver was scheduled to begin at 17:34 UTC, followed by reentry into the dense atmosphere at 18:10 UTC. Surviving debris of the spacecraft were calculated to impact the Pacific Ocean at 18:24 UTC on the same day.
