= Kurs (docking navigation system) =

System of automated tracking

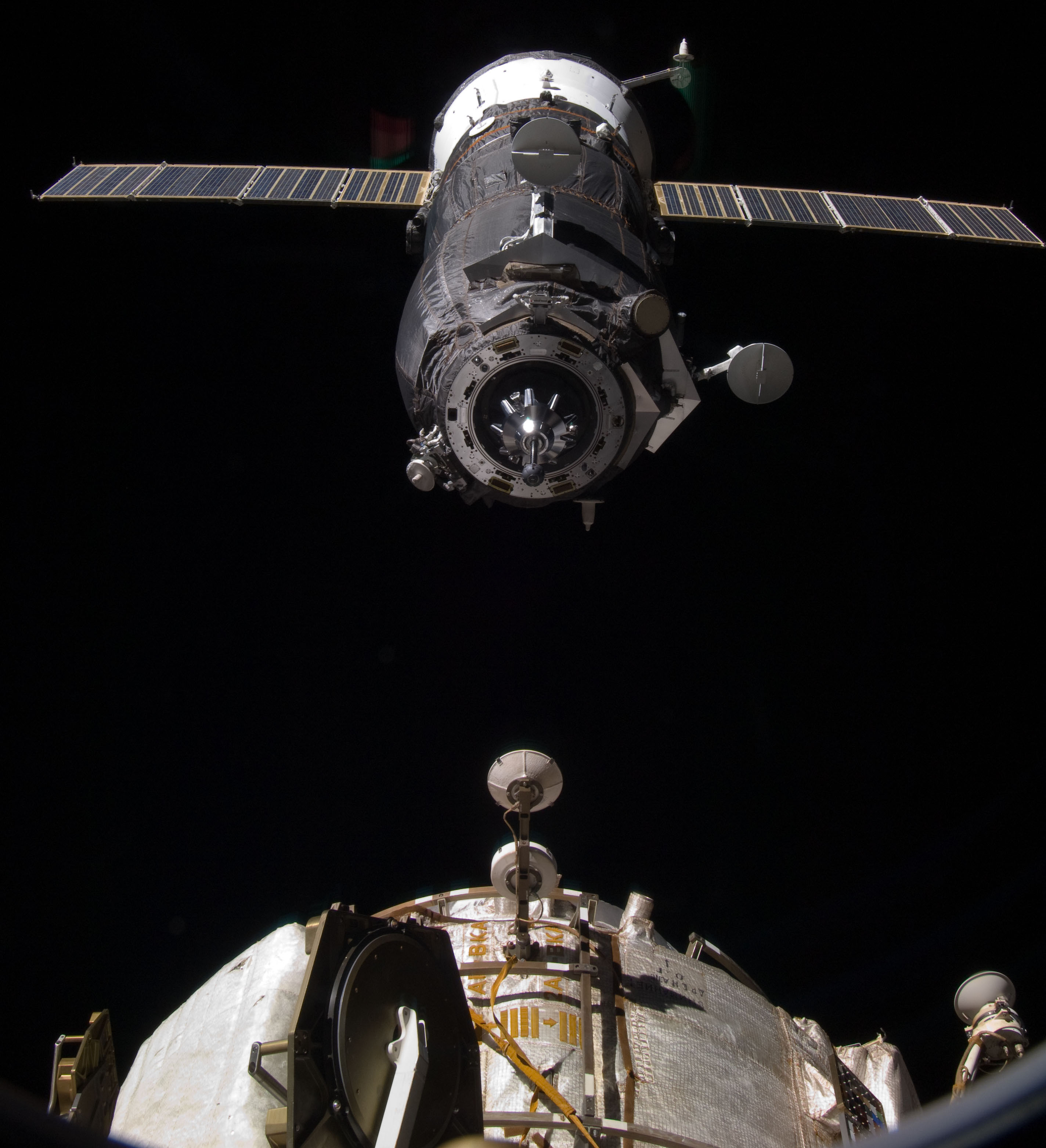
The Progress vehicle docking to the Pirs module using the Kurs-A docking system

Kurs (Russian: Курс, lit. 'Course') is an automated system for docking spacecraft used by the Soviet and later the Russian space program. The system is primarily used by Progress cargo spacecraft, Soyuz spacecraft and to dock new modules to the Russian Orbital Segment of the International Space Station. The radio-based control system was developed by the Research Institute of Precision Instruments in Moscow before 1985 and initially manufactured by the Kiev Radio Factory. Kurs is now manufactured in Russia.

== History ==
Kurs was the successor to the Igla system and today provides navigation beaconing for Russian space vehicles including the Soyuz spacecraft and Progress spacecraft. The main difference between both systems is that Igla requires the space station to collaborate in the docking maneuver by reorienting itself to point the docking port to the spacecraft, while Kurs allows docking with a fully stationary space station. The main reason for this change was that Mir was to be a much bigger space station than the older Salyut, so the propellant consumption would have been excessive for each docking. Kurs provided the automated docking system for all Russian spacecraft that docked with the Mir space station. When used for docking, the Soyuz or Progress vehicle broadcasts radar pulses from multiple antennas. The variation in strength between the antennas allows the system to compute relative position, attitude, and approach rate. The system is designed for automatic rendezvous and docking, but in an emergency cosmonauts may take command of the vehicle, either locally or from the International Space Station.

After the dissolution of the Soviet Union in 1991, the Kurs system became the property of Ukraine; its manufacturer became a competitor in the space launch business with the Russian Federal Space Agency (RKA). Due to hard-currency problems, Kiev also raised the price of the Kurs system. Consequently, RKA sought to phase out its use in its vehicles. A test using the Russian TORU backup system to reduce reliance on Kurs, was responsible for the collision between Mir and Progress M-34 and the damage to the Spektr module, nearly causing Mir to be abandoned. After the collision and recovery, the next Progress ship had a failure of Kurs, and was docked successfully using the same TORU system.

=== Kurs-NA ===
The Kurs-NA (Russian: Новая Активная, romanized: Novaya Aktivnaya, lit. 'New Active') docking system, requiring only one rendezvous antenna and using less power, replaces Kurs-A, which required five antennas. It was tested by Progress M-15M in July 2012 and by Progress M-21M in November 2013. It is used on the Progress MS (2015-present).

== ISS ==
=== ATV ===
The now Russian-built antenna part of the Kurs system also served as an independent and redundant docking monitoring system for the European Automated Transfer Vehicle. It served as an additional monitoring system and could not be used to control the approach or docking of the ATV.

== Failures ==
1. On 18 November 2000 during the docking of Progress M1-4 with the International Space Station the Kurs system failed requiring a manual docking approach by Soyuz commander Yuri Gidzenko. The failure was due to a software glitch that prevented the ship's computer system from smoothly switching from guidance data transmitted by antennas on the Zvezda module to signals transmitted from Zarya. A later redocking had to be done manually, also by Gidzenko, as an antenna required for the final approach was irreversibly retracted during the initial approach.
2. Immediately after launch of Progress M-01M on 26 November 2008, a Kurs antenna failed to deploy. The antenna was successfully deployed about three hours later after flight controllers resent the deployment command, however the spacecraft was docked to the International Space Station using the TORU system, controlled by Cosmonaut Yury Lonchakov, as a precaution.
3. On 29 July 2009 Progress M-67 was on approach to the International Space Station in an incorrect orientation. The Kurs system was deactivated, and Cosmonaut Gennady Padalka performed a manual docking using the TORU system.
4. On 1 May 2010 Progress M-05M was about 1 kilometer away from the International Space Station when its Kurs system failed. Oleg Kotov used the backup TORU system to manually control the rendezvous and docking, setting a record for the furthest distance a Progress spacecraft was flown under manual control.
5. On 15 December 2015 during the docking of Soyuz TMA-19M with the International Space Station the Kurs system mis-aligned the spacecraft and failed to dock, requiring a manual docking approach piloted by Soyuz Commander Yuri Malenchenko. This delayed the docking by 10 minutes.
6. On 24 August 2019 during the docking of the uncrewed Soyuz MS-14 with the International Space Station the spacecraft failed to lock on to the Poisk Module port due to a failure in a Kurs signal amplifier on the Poisk module and failed to dock. Since the backup TORU system was not installed on the vehicle, the docking attempt was aborted. It was decided that Soyuz MS-13 would be manually relocated onto the faulty Poisk port, freeing up the Zvezda aft port for Soyuz MS-14 to dock there successfully three days later on 27 August.
7. On 17 February 2021 during final approach Progress MS-16 suffered a communication issue 20m from the station. Kurs was deactivated and Sergey Ryzhikov took manual control with the TORU system and docked successfully.
8. On 5 October 2021 during the docking of Soyuz MS-19 there was a malfunction of the Kurs system on the Rassvet port, requiring the Soyuz spacecraft commander Anton Shkaplerov to take control and dock manually.

As of May 2022, there have been 83 successful dockings to the International Space Station performed by Kurs with Soyuz & Progress vehicles, and the Nauka station module, giving Kurs a 90.4% success rate.

== See also ==
- TriDAR, a relative navigation vision system used on three Space Shuttle flights to the ISS
