= List of spaceflight launches in July–December 2021 =

This article lists orbital and suborbital launches during the second half of the year 2021, including launches planned for 2021 without a specific launch date.

For all other spaceflight activities, see 2021 in spaceflight. For launches in the first half of 2021, see List of spaceflight launches in January–June 2021. For launches in 2022, see List of spaceflight launches in January–June 2022.

== Orbital launches ==
- ← Jan
- Feb
- Mar
- Apr
- May
- Jun
- Jul
- Aug
- Sep
- Oct
- Nov
- Dec →

Date and time (UTC)	Rocket	Flight number	Launch site		LSP	
Date and time (UTC)	Payload (⚀ = CubeSat)	Operator	Orbit	Function	Decay (UTC)	Outcome
Date and time (UTC)	Remarks					
=== July ===
1 July; 12:48:33	(Russia) Soyuz-2.1b / Fregat	ST33	(Russia) Vostochny Site 1S		(France) Arianespace / (Russia) Starsem	
1 July; 12:48:33	(United Kingdom) OneWeb × 36	OneWeb	Low Earth	Communications	In orbit	Operational
3 July; 02:51	(China) Long March 2D	2D-Y74	(China) Taiyuan LC-9		(China) CASC	
3 July; 02:51	(China) Jilin-1 Kuanfu-01B	Chang Guang Satellite Technology	Low Earth (SSO)	Earth observation	In orbit	Operational
3 July; 02:51	(China) Jilin-1 Gaofen-03D 01, 02, 03	Chang Guang Satellite Technology	Low Earth (SSO)	Earth observation	In orbit	Operational
3 July; 02:51	(China) Xingshidai-10	ADA Space	Low Earth (SSO)	Earth observation	In orbit	Operational
4 July; 23:28	(China) Long March 4C	4C-Y43	(China) Jiuquan SLS-2		(China) CASC	
4 July; 23:28	(China) Fengyun 3E	CMA	Low Earth (SSO)	Meteorology	In orbit	Operational
6 July; 15:53	(China) Long March 3C/E	3C-Y18	(China) Xichang LC-2		(China) CASC	
6 July; 15:53	(China) Tianlian I-05	CNSA	Geosynchronous	Communications	In orbit	Operational
9 July; 11:59	(China) Long March 6	Y6	(China) Taiyuan LC-16		(China) CASC	
9 July; 11:59	(China) Zhuzhou-1 (Zhongzi-02) × 5	Zhuzhou State Investment Group	Low Earth	Earth observation	In orbit	Operational
19 July; 00:19	(China) Long March 2C	2C-Y49	(China) Xichang LC-3		(China) CASC	
19 July; 00:19	(China) Yaogan 30-10A	CAS	Low Earth	Reconnaissance	In orbit	Operational
19 July; 00:19	(China) Yaogan 30-10B	CAS	Low Earth	Reconnaissance	In orbit	Operational
19 July; 00:19	(China) Yaogan 30-10C	CAS	Low Earth	Reconnaissance	In orbit	Operational
19 July; 00:19	⚀ (China) Tianqi-15	Guodian Gaoke	Low Earth	IoT	In orbit	Operational
19 July; 00:19	A fairing recovery system using parachutes was tested on this launch.					
21 July; 14:58:25	(Russia) Proton-M		(Kazakhstan) Baikonur Site 200/39		(Russia) Roscosmos	
21 July; 14:58:25	(Russia) Nauka	Roscosmos	Low Earth (ISS)	ISS assembly	In orbit	Operational
21 July; 14:58:25	Nauka was launched along with the European Robotic Arm.					
27 July	(China) Long March 2C?		(China)		(China)	
27 July	(China) Fractional Orbital Bombardment System	PLARF	Transatmospheric Earth orbit	Hypersonic glide vehicle test	27 July	Successful
29 July; 04:01	(China) Long March 2D	2D-Y62	(China) Jiuquan SLS-2		(China) CASC	
29 July; 04:01	(China) Tianhui-1D	CNSA	Low Earth (SSO)	Earth observation	In orbit	Operational
29 July; 06:00	(United States) Electron	"It’s a Little Chile Up Here"	(New Zealand) Mahia LC-1A		(United States) Rocket Lab	
29 July; 06:00	(United States) Monolith	U.S. Space Force	Low Earth	Space weather Technology demonstration	In orbit	Operational
29 July; 06:00	Return to flight for Electron following the May 2021 launch failure, flying the Space Force's Monolith satellite as the STP-27RM mission.					
30 July; 21:00	(France) Ariane 5 ECA	VA254	(France) Kourou ELA-3		(France) Arianespace	
30 July; 21:00	(France) Eutelsat Quantum	Eutelsat	Geosynchronous	Communications	In orbit	Operational
30 July; 21:00	(Brazil) Star One D2	Star One	Geosynchronous	Communications	In orbit	Operational
← Jan; Feb; Mar; Apr; May; Jun; Jul; Aug; Sep; Oct; Nov; Dec →; === August ===
3 August; 07:39	(China) Hyperbola-1	Y5	(China) Jiuquan LS-95B		(China) i-Space	
3 August; 07:39	(China) Jilin-1 Mofang-01A	Chang Guang Satellite Technology	Low Earth (SSO)	Earth observation	3 August	Launch failure
3 August; 07:39	Second failure in a row for the Hyperbola-1 launcher. Rocket failed to achieve correct orbit insertion after a malfunctioning in fairing separation. Jilin-1 Mofang-01A would have been the first fourth-generation Jilin-1 satellite, with a reduced payload mass of 18 kg (40 lb).					
4 August; 11:01	(China) Long March 6	Y7	(China) Taiyuan LC-16		(China) CASC	
4 August; 11:01	(Germany) KL-Beta A	KLEO Connect	Low Earth (Polar)	Communications	In orbit	Operational
4 August; 11:01	(Germany) KL-Beta B	KLEO Connect	Low Earth (Polar)	Communications	In orbit	Operational
4 August; 11:01	Second set of "global multimedia satellites" built by CAS for KLEO Connect.					
5 August; 16:30:05	(China) Long March 3B/E	3B-Y76	(China) Xichang LC-2		(China) CASC	
5 August; 16:30:05	(China) ChinaSat 2E	China Satcom	Geosynchronous	Military communications	In orbit	Operational
10 August; 22:01:05	(United States) Antares 230+		(United States) MARS LP-0A		(United States) Northrop Grumman	
10 August; 22:01:05	(United States) Cygnus NG-16; S.S. Ellison Onizuka	NASA	Low Earth (ISS)	ISS logistics	15 December	Successful
10 August; 22:01:05	(United States) PIRPL	SDA / MDA	Low Earth	Technology demonstration	In orbit	Operational
10 August; 22:01:05	PIRPL was deployed after NG-16 undocked from the space station.					
12 August; 00:13	(India) GSLV Mk II	F10	(India) Satish Dhawan SLP		(India) ISRO	
12 August; 00:13	(India) EOS-03 (GISAT-1)	ISRO	Geosynchronous	Earth observation	12 August	Launch failure
12 August; 00:13	Launch failed due to third stage ignition failure.					
17 August; 01:47:06	(Italy) Vega	VV19	(France) Kourou ELV		(France) Arianespace	
17 August; 01:47:06	(France) Pléiades-Neo 4	Airbus Defence and Space	Low Earth (SSO)	Earth observation	In orbit	Operational
17 August; 01:47:06	⚀ (France) BRO-4	UnseenLabs	Low Earth (SSO)	SIGINT	In orbit	Operational
17 August; 01:47:06	⚀ (Italy) LEDSAT	Sapienza University of Rome	Low Earth (SSO)	Education	In orbit	Operational
17 August; 01:47:06	⚀ (Hungary) RADCUBE	ESA / C3S Hungary	Low Earth (SSO)	Space weather	In orbit	Operational
17 August; 01:47:06	⚀ (Finland) SUNSTORM	ESA / Reaktor Space Lab	Low Earth (SSO)	Space weather	In orbit	Operational
17 August; 01:47:06	SSMS piggyback mission.					
18 August; 22:32	(China) Long March 4B	4B-Y50	(China) Taiyuan LC-9		(China) CASC	
18 August; 22:32	(China) Tianhui-2 02A	CNSA	Low Earth (SSO)	Earth observation	In orbit	Operational
18 August; 22:32	(China) Tianhui-2 02B	CNSA	Low Earth (SSO)	Earth observation	In orbit	Operational
21 August; 22:13:40	(Russia) Soyuz-2.1b / Fregat	ST34	(Kazakhstan) Baikonur Site 31/6		(France) Arianespace / (Russia) Starsem	
21 August; 22:13:40	(United Kingdom) OneWeb × 34	OneWeb	Low Earth	Communications	In orbit	Operational
24 August; 11:15	(China) Long March 2C / YZ-1S	2C-Y51	(China) Jiuquan SLS-2		(China) CASC	
24 August; 11:15	(China) RSW-01	CAST	Low Earth (Polar)	Communications	In orbit	Operational
24 August; 11:15	(China) RSW-02	CAST	Low Earth (Polar)	Communications	In orbit	Operational
24 August; 11:15	(China) Undisclosed payload	DFH Satellite	Low Earth (Polar)	Communications	In orbit	Operational
24 August; 15:41	(China) Long March 3B/E	3B-Y78	(China) Xichang LC-3		(China) CASC	
24 August; 15:41	(China) TJS-7	SAST	Geosynchronous	SIGINT	In orbit	Operational
28 August; 22:35	(United States) Rocket 3.3	LV0006	(United States) Kodiak LP-3B		(United States) Astra	
28 August; 22:35	(United States) STP-27AD1	U.S. Space Force	Low Earth	Flight test	28 August	Launch failure
28 August; 22:35	Third Rocket 3 orbital launch attempt and first Rocket 3 commercial flight. Vehicle also known as Rocket 3.3, which became the standard configuration used for subsequent Rocket 3 launches. STP-27AD1 consisted of equipment attached to the upper stage to verify the rocket's performance during launch. Terminated at an altitude of approximately 50 km (31 mi) due to an engine failure at liftoff, which precluded the possibility of reaching orbit.					
29 August; 07:14:49	(United States) Falcon 9 Block 5	F9-124	(United States) Kennedy LC-39A		(United States) SpaceX	
29 August; 07:14:49	(United States) SpaceX CRS-23	NASA	Low Earth (ISS)	ISS logistics	1 October; 02:57	Successful
29 August; 07:14:49	⚀ (Australia) Binar-1	Curtin University	Low Earth	Technology demonstration	30 September 2022	Successful
29 August; 07:14:49	⚀ (United States) CAPSat	UIUC	Low Earth	Quantum annealing	18 September 2022	Successful
29 August; 07:14:49	⚀ (Australia) CUAVA-1	CUAVA	Low Earth	Technology demonstration	2 September 2022	Successful
29 August; 07:14:49	⚀ (Philippines) (Japan) Maya-3	DOST / Kyushu Institute of Technology	Low Earth	Technology demonstration	4 August 2022	Successful
29 August; 07:14:49	⚀ (Philippines) (Japan) Maya-4	DOST / Kyushu Institute of Technology	Low Earth	Technology demonstration	8 August 2022	Successful
29 August; 07:14:49	⚀ (United States) PR-CuNaR2 (NanoRocks-2)	UIPR	Low Earth	Education	30 August 2022	Successful
29 August; 07:14:49	⚀ (United States) SPACE HAUC	UMass Lowell	Low Earth	Technology demonstration	11 April 2022	Successful
29 August; 07:14:49	The ELaNa 37 mission launched on this flight. Binar-1, Maya-3, Maya-4, and CUAVA-1 were deployed into orbit from the ISS on 6 October 2021. CAPSat, PR-CuNaR2, and SPACE HAUC were deployed into orbit from the ISS on 12 October 2021.					
← Jan; Feb; Mar; Apr; May; Jun; Jul; Aug; Sep; Oct; Nov; Dec →; === September ===
3 September; 01:59:00	(United States) Firefly Alpha	FLTA001	(United States) Vandenberg SLC-2W		(United States) Firefly	
3 September; 01:59:00	⚀ (United States) BSS1 (DFAST Demonstrator)	Benchmark Space	Low Earth	Technology demonstration	3 September	Launch failure
3 September; 01:59:00	⚀ (United States) Firefly Capsule 1	Firefly	Low Earth	Education	3 September	Launch failure
3 September; 01:59:00	⚀ (United States) Hiapo	Hawaii Science and Technology Museum	Low Earth	Thermospheric research	3 September	Launch failure
3 September; 01:59:00	⚀ (United States) Spinnaker-3	Purdue University	Low Earth	Technology demonstration	3 September	Launch failure
3 September; 01:59:00	⚀ (United States) TIS Serenity	Teachers in Space, Inc.	Low Earth	Education	3 September	Launch failure
3 September; 01:59:00	▫ (Greece) PicoBus	Libre Space Foundation	Low Earth	PocketQube deployer	3 September	Launch failure
3 September; 01:59:00	▫ (Spain) FOSSASAT 1b	FOSSA Systems	Low Earth	LoRa communications	3 September	Launch failure
3 September; 01:59:00	▫ (Spain) FOSSASAT 2	FOSSA Systems	Low Earth	Photography	3 September	Launch failure
3 September; 01:59:00	▫ (Spain) GENESIS L	AMSAT-EA	Low Earth	Amateur radio/Propulsion	3 September	Launch failure
3 September; 01:59:00	▫ (Spain) GENESIS N	AMSAT-EA	Low Earth	Amateur radio/Propulsion	3 September	Launch failure
3 September; 01:59:00	▫ (Greece) QUBIK 1	Libre Space Foundation	Low Earth	Amateur radio	3 September	Launch failure
3 September; 01:59:00	▫ (Greece) QUBIK 2	Libre Space Foundation	Low Earth	Amateur radio	3 September	Launch failure
3 September; 01:59:00	First flight of the Firefly Alpha commercial smallsat launcher. Over twenty rideshare payloads were manifested through Firefly's Dedicated Research and Education Accelerator Mission (DREAM) program. Failure occurred about two minutes after liftoff.					
7 September; 03:01	(China) Long March 4C	4C-Y40	(China) Taiyuan LC-9		(China) CASC	
7 September; 03:01	(China) Gaofen-5 02	Ministry of Ecology and Environment	Low Earth (SSO)	Earth observation	In orbit	Operational
9 September; 11:50	(China) Long March 3B/E	3B-Y86	(China) Xichang LC-2		(China) CASC	
9 September; 11:50	(China) ChinaSat 9B	China Satcom	Geosynchronous	Communications	In orbit	Operational
9 September; 11:50	Replacement for ChinaSat 9A.					
9 September; 19:59:47	(Russia) Soyuz-2.1v / Volga		(Russia) Plesetsk Site 43/4		(Russia) RVSN RF	
9 September; 19:59:47	(Russia) EO MKA №1 (Kosmos 2551)	Ministry of Defence	Low Earth (SSO)	Reconnaissance	20 October; 04:43	Spacecraft failure
9 September; 19:59:47	Operational successor to EMKA (Kosmos 2525). The identity of this military satellite is disputed; it may be EMKA №2 or Razbeg №1. Failed in orbit shortly after launch.					
14 September; 03:55:50	(United States) Falcon 9 Block 5	Starlink Group 2-1	(United States) Vandenberg SLC-4E		(United States) SpaceX	
14 September; 03:55:50	(United States) Starlink × 51	SpaceX	Low Earth	Communications	In orbit	Operational
14 September; 03:55:50	First launch of Starlink satellites from Vandenberg, to a 70-degree orbital inclination. First Starlink V1.5 satellites, featuring laser inter-satellite links. First launch of Starlink Group 2 Satellites.					
14 September; 18:07:19	(Russia) Soyuz-2.1b / Fregat	ST35	(Kazakhstan) Baikonur Site 31/6		(France) Arianespace / (Russia) Starsem	
14 September; 18:07:19	(United Kingdom) OneWeb × 34	OneWeb	Low Earth	Communications	In orbit	Operational
16 September; 00:02:56	(United States) Falcon 9 Block 5	F9-126	(United States) Kennedy LC-39A		(United States) SpaceX	
16 September; 00:02:56	(United States) Inspiration4	SpaceX	Low Earth	Space tourism	18 September; 23:06	Successful
16 September; 00:02:56	Crew Dragon orbital flight carrying four civilian passengers for 3 days, led by Jared Isaacman. Mission aims to raise up to $200 million for St. Jude Children's Research Hospital by February 2022. Civilian participant Hayley Arceneaux became the first human in space with a prosthesis, and the youngest American in space.					
20 September; 07:10:11	(China) Long March 7	Y4	(China) Wenchang LC-2		(China) CASC	
20 September; 07:10:11	(China) Tianzhou 3	CMSA	Low Earth (TSS)	Space logistics	27 July 2022; 03:31	Successful
20 September; 07:10:11	Second cargo flight to the Tiangong space station.					
27 September; 06:19	(China) Kuaizhou 1A	Y4	(China) Jiuquan LS-95A		(China) ExPace	
27 September; 06:19	(China) Jilin-1 Gaofen-02D	Chang Guang Satellite Technology	Low Earth (SSO)	Earth observation	In orbit	Operational
27 September; 06:19	Return-to-flight for Kuaizhou 1A following the September 2020 launch failure.					
27 September; 08:20	(China) Long March 3B/E	3B-Y81	(China) Xichang LC-2		(China) CASC	
27 September; 08:20	(China) Shiyan 10	CAST	Molniya	Technology demonstration	In orbit	Operational
27 September; 08:20	Satellite experienced a failure in orbit following successful launch. It was subsequently reactivated and commenced orbit raising in mid-October. The satellite reached its intended Molniya orbit in March 2022.					
27 September; 18:12	(United States) Atlas V 401	AV-092	(United States) Vandenberg SLC-3E		(United States) ULA	
27 September; 18:12	(United States) Landsat 9	NASA / USGS	Low Earth (SSO)	Meteorology	In orbit	Operational
27 September; 18:12	⚀ (United States) CUTE	CU Boulder	Low Earth (SSO)	Ultraviolet astronomy	In orbit	Operational
27 September; 18:12	⚀ (United States) CuPID	Boston University	Low Earth (SSO)	Space weather	In orbit	Operational
27 September; 18:12	⚀ (United States) Cesium Mission 1 × 2	CesiumAstro	Low Earth (SSO)	Technology demonstration	In orbit	Spacecraft failure
27 September; 18:12	The ELaNa 34 mission, consisting of two CubeSats, launched on this flight. The two Cesium Mission 1 satellites experienced power failures before they could conduct their payload demonstrations.					
← Jan; Feb; Mar; Apr; May; Jun; Jul; Aug; Sep; Oct; Nov; Dec →; === October ===
5 October; 08:55:02	(Russia) Soyuz-2.1a		(Kazakhstan) Baikonur Site 31/6		(Russia) Roscosmos	
5 October; 08:55:02	(Russia) Soyuz MS-19	Roscosmos	Low Earth (ISS)	Expedition 65/66; Space tourism	30 March 2022; 11:28:26	Successful
5 October; 08:55:02	Russian actress Yulia Peresild and filmmaker Klim Shipenko stayed on the ISS for almost 12 days and returned aboard Soyuz MS-18. Scenes for the Russian space film The Challenge were shot during their stay.					
14 October; 09:40:10	(Russia) Soyuz-2.1b / Fregat	ST36	(Russia) Vostochny Site 1S		(France) Arianespace / (Russia) Starsem	
14 October; 09:40:10	(United Kingdom) OneWeb × 36	OneWeb	Low Earth	Communications	In orbit	Operational
14 October; 10:51	(China) Long March 2D	2D-Y53	(China) Taiyuan LC-9		(China) CASC	
14 October; 10:51	(China) Chinese Hα Solar Explorer (CHASE / Xihe)	Nanjing University / SAST	Low Earth (SSO)	Solar physics	In orbit	Operational
14 October; 10:51	(China) Guidao Daqi Midu TSW (MD-1)	CMA	Low Earth (SSO)	Earth observation	In orbit	Operational
14 October; 10:51	(China) HEAD-2E	HEAD Aerospace	Low Earth (SSO)	AIS ship tracking	In orbit	Operational
14 October; 10:51	(China) HEAD-2F	HEAD Aerospace	Low Earth (SSO)	AIS ship tracking	In orbit	Operational
14 October; 10:51	(China) MOTS	Shanghai Lizheng Satellite	Low Earth (SSO)	Technology demonstration	In orbit	Operational
14 October; 10:51	(China) QX-1	Shenzhen DFH	Low Earth (SSO)	GNSS radio occultation	In orbit	Operational
14 October; 10:51	(China) SSS-1	Beihang University / APSCO	Low Earth (SSO)	Education	In orbit	Operational
14 October; 10:51	(China) Tianshu-1	Insight Position Digital Intelligence Technology Service	Low Earth (SSO)	Technology demonstration	In orbit	Operational
14 October; 10:51	⚀ (China) Golden Bauhinia-2	ZeroG Lab	Low Earth (SSO)	Earth observation	In orbit	Operational
14 October; 10:51	⚀ (China) SSS-2A	SJTU / APSCO	Low Earth (SSO)	Education	In orbit	Operational
14 October; 10:51	⚀ (China) Tianyuan-1	NJUST	Low Earth (SSO)	Space environment Education	In orbit	Operational
15 October; 16:23:56	(China) Long March 2F	Y13	(China) Jiuquan SLS-1		(China) CASC	
15 October; 16:23:56	(China) Shenzhou 13	CMSA	Low Earth (TSS)	Crewed spaceflight	16 April 2022; 01:56	Successful
15 October; 16:23:56	Second crewed flight to the Tiangong space station.					
16 October; 09:34:00	(United States) Atlas V 401	AV-096	(United States) Cape Canaveral SLC-41		(United States) ULA	
16 October; 09:34:00	(United States) Lucy	NASA	Heliocentric	Exploration of Jupiter trojans	In orbit	En route
21 October; 08:00	(South Korea) Nuri (KSLV-II)		(South Korea) Naro LC-2		(South Korea) KARI	
21 October; 08:00	(South Korea) Dummy payload	KARI	Low Earth (SSO)	Flight test	21 October	Launch failure
21 October; 08:00	Maiden flight of Nuri (also known as KSLV-II), South Korea's first indigenously developed orbital launch vehicle. The third stage shut down 46 seconds prematurely, resulting in the vehicle falling short of orbital velocity. Apogee: 700 km (430 mi).					
24 October; 01:27:03	(China) Long March 3B/E	3B-Y83	(China) Xichang LC-2		(China) CASC	
24 October; 01:27:03	(China) Shijian-21	CAST	Geosynchronous	Space debris removal Technology demonstration	In orbit	Operational
24 October; 01:27:03	Docked to the defunct Compass-G2 (Beidou-2 G2) satellite in late December. A large orbit-raising burn was performed on 22 January 2022 to send the satellite to a high graveyard orbit.					
24 October; 02:10	(France) Ariane 5 ECA	VA255	(France) Kourou ELA-3		(France) Arianespace	
24 October; 02:10	(Luxembourg) SES-17	SES S.A.	Geosynchronous	Communications	In orbit	Operational
24 October; 02:10	(France) Syracuse 4A (Comsat-NG 1)	DGA	Geosynchronous	Military communications	In orbit	Operational
26 October; 02:19:37	(Japan) H-IIA 202	F44	(Japan) Tanegashima LA-Y1		(Japan) MHI	
26 October; 02:19:37	(Japan) QZS-1R	CAO	Tundra	Navigation	In orbit	Operational
26 October; 02:19:37	Replacement for QZS-1 (Michibiki-1).					
27 October; 06:19	(China) Kuaizhou 1A	Y5	(China) Jiuquan LS-95A		(China) ExPace	
27 October; 06:19	(China) Jilin-1 Gaofen-02F	Chang Guang Satellite Technology	Low Earth (SSO)	Earth observation	In orbit	Operational
27 October; 06:19	Launch vehicle named "Kuaizhou·Xinzhou" to commemorate the rocket assembly line in Xinzhou District, Wuhan.					
28 October; 00:00:32	(Russia) Soyuz-2.1a		(Kazakhstan) Baikonur Site 31/6		(Russia) Roscosmos	
28 October; 00:00:32	(Russia) Progress MS-18 / 79P	Roscosmos	Low Earth (ISS)	ISS logistics	1 June 2022; 11:51	Successful
← Jan; Feb; Mar; Apr; May; Jun; Jul; Aug; Sep; Oct; Nov; Dec →; === November ===
3 November; 07:43	(China) Long March 2C / YZ-1S	2C-Y41	(China) Jiuquan SLS-2		(China) CASC	
3 November; 07:43	(China) Yaogan 32-02A	CAS	Low Earth (SSO)	Reconnaissance	In orbit	Operational
3 November; 07:43	(China) Yaogan 32-02B	CAS	Low Earth (SSO)	Reconnaissance	In orbit	Operational
5 November; 02:19	(China) Long March 6	Y8	(China) Taiyuan LC-16		(China) CASC	
5 November; 02:19	(China) SDGSAT-1 (Guangmu / CASEarth)	CAS	Low Earth (SSO)	Earth observation	In orbit	Operational
6 November; 03:00	(China) Long March 2D	2D-Y63	(China) Xichang LC-3		(China) CASC	
6 November; 03:00	(China) Yaogan 35A	CAS	Low Earth	Reconnaissance	In orbit	Operational
6 November; 03:00	(China) Yaogan 35B	CAS	Low Earth	Reconnaissance	In orbit	Operational
6 November; 03:00	(China) Yaogan 35C	CAS	Low Earth	Reconnaissance	In orbit	Operational
9 November; 00:55:16	(Japan) Epsilon	Epsilon-5	(Japan) Uchinoura		(Japan) JAXA	
9 November; 00:55:16	(Japan) RAISE-2	JAXA	Low Earth (SSO)	Technology demonstration	In orbit	Successful
9 November; 00:55:16	(Japan) HIBARI	Tokyo Tech	Low Earth (SSO)	Technology demonstration	In orbit	Operational
9 November; 00:55:16	(Japan) Z-Sat	MHI	Low Earth (SSO)	Technology demonstration	In orbit	Operational
9 November; 00:55:16	(Japan) DRUMS	KHI	Low Earth (SSO)	Technology demonstration	In orbit	Operational
9 November; 00:55:16	(Japan) TeikyoSat-4	Teikyo University	Low Earth (SSO)	Technology demonstration	In orbit	Operational
9 November; 00:55:16	⚀ (Japan) ASTERISC	Chiba Institute of Technology	Low Earth (SSO)	Technology demonstration	In orbit	Operational
9 November; 00:55:16	⚀ (Japan) ARICA	Aoyama Gakuin University	Low Earth (SSO)	Technology demonstration	In orbit	Operational
9 November; 00:55:16	⚀ (Vietnam) (Japan) NanoDragon	VNSC / Meisei Electric	Low Earth (SSO)	Navigation technology demonstration	In orbit	Operational
9 November; 00:55:16	⚀ (Japan) KOSEN-1	Kochi National College of Technology	Low Earth (SSO)	Technology demonstration	In orbit	Operational
9 November; 00:55:16	Innovative Satellite Technology Demonstration-2 mission, carrying nine satellites.					
11 November; 02:03:31	(United States) Falcon 9 Block 5	F9-127	(United States) Kennedy LC-39A		(United States) SpaceX	
11 November; 02:03:31	(United States) SpaceX Crew-3	SpaceX / NASA	Low Earth (ISS)	Expedition 66/67	6 May 2022; 04:43	Successful
11 November; 02:03:31	Third operational Crew Dragon mission, as part of the Commercial Crew Program.					
13 November; 12:19:30	(United States) Falcon 9 Block 5	Starlink Group 4-1	(United States) Cape Canaveral SLC-40		(United States) SpaceX	
13 November; 12:19:30	(United States) Starlink × 53	SpaceX	Low Earth	Communications	In orbit	Operational
13 November; 12:19:30	First launch of Starlink Group 4 Satellites from Cape Canaveral.					
16 November; 09:27:55	(Italy) Vega	VV20	(France) Kourou ELV		(France) Arianespace	
16 November; 09:27:55	(France) CERES × 3	CNES / DGA	Low Earth	SIGINT	In orbit	Operational
18 November; 01:38:13	(United States) Electron	"Love At First Insight"	(New Zealand) Mahia LC-1A		(United States) Rocket Lab	
18 November; 01:38:13	(United States) BlackSky 10 (Global-14)	BlackSky	Low Earth	Earth observation	In orbit	Operational
18 November; 01:38:13	(United States) BlackSky 11 (Global-15)	BlackSky	Low Earth	Earth observation	In orbit	Operational
18 November; 01:38:13	Second of four dedicated launches for BlackSky.					
20 November; 01:51	(China) Long March 4B	4B-Y52	(China) Taiyuan LC-9		(China) CASC	
20 November; 01:51	(China) Gaofen 11-03	CNSA	Low Earth (SSO)	Reconnaissance	In orbit	Operational
20 November; 06:16	(United States) Rocket 3.3	LV0007	(United States) Kodiak LP-3B		(United States) Astra	
20 November; 06:16	(United States) STP-27AD2	U.S. Space Force	Low Earth	Flight test	In orbit	Operational
20 November; 06:16	Fourth Rocket 3 orbital launch attempt and first to successfully reach orbit. STP-27AD2 consists of equipment attached to the upper stage to verify the rocket's performance during launch.					
22 November; 23:45	(China) Long March 4C	4C-Y37	(China) Jiuquan SLS-2		(China) CASC	
22 November; 23:45	(China) Gaofen 3-02	Ministry of Natural Resources	Low Earth (SSO)	Earth observation	In orbit	Operational
24 November; 06:21:02	(United States) Falcon 9 Block 5	F9-129	(United States) Vandenberg SLC-4E		(United States) SpaceX	
24 November; 06:21:02	(United States) DART	NASA	Heliocentric	Asteroid redirect test	26 September 2022; 23:14	Successful
24 November; 06:21:02	⚀ (Italy) LICIACube	ASI	Heliocentric	Asteroid flyby	In orbit	Operational
24 November; 06:21:02	The Double Asteroid Redirection Test (DART) spacecraft traveled to 65803 Didymos and impacted its small asteroid satellite, Dimorphos.					
24 November; 13:06:35	(Russia) Soyuz-2.1b		(Kazakhstan) Baikonur Site 31/6		(Russia) Roscosmos	
24 November; 13:06:35	(Russia) Progress M-UM	Roscosmos	Low Earth (ISS)	Space tug	23 December; 04:30	Successful
24 November; 13:06:35	(Russia) Prichal	Roscosmos	Low Earth (ISS)	ISS assembly	In orbit	Operational
24 November; 13:06:35	ISS flight 6R.					
24 November; 23:41	(China) Kuaizhou 1A	Y13	(China) Jiuquan LS-95A		(China) ExPace	
24 November; 23:41	(China) Shiyan 11	CAST	Low Earth (SSO)	Technology demonstration	In orbit	Operational
25 November; 01:09:13	(Russia) Soyuz-2.1b / Fregat		(Russia) Plesetsk Site 43/4		(Russia) VKS	
25 November; 01:09:13	(Russia) EKS-5 (Tundra 15L, Kosmos 2552)	Ministry of Defence	Tundra	Early warning	In orbit	Operational
26 November; 16:40:04	(China) Long March 3B/E	3B-Y79	(China) Xichang LC-2		(China) CASC	
26 November; 16:40:04	(China) ChinaSat-1D	China Satcom	Geosynchronous	Military communications	In orbit	Operational
← Jan; Feb; Mar; Apr; May; Jun; Jul; Aug; Sep; Oct; Nov; Dec →; === December ===
2 December; 23:12	(United States) Falcon 9 Block 5	Starlink Group 4-3	(United States) Cape Canaveral SLC-40		(United States) SpaceX	
2 December; 23:12	(United States) Starlink × 48	SpaceX	Low Earth	Communications	In orbit	Operational
2 December; 23:12	(United States) BlackSky 12 (Global-12)	BlackSky	Low Earth	Earth observation	In orbit	Operational
2 December; 23:12	(United States) BlackSky 13 (Global-13)	BlackSky	Low Earth	Earth observation	In orbit	Operational
2 December; 23:12	Two BlackSky satellites were launched as part of the SXRS-2 rideshare mission.					
5 December; 00:19:20	(Russia) Soyuz ST-B / Fregat-MT	VS26	(France) Kourou ELS		(France) Arianespace	
5 December; 00:19:20	Galileo FOC FM23	ESA	Medium Earth	Navigation	In orbit	Operational
5 December; 00:19:20	Galileo FOC FM24	ESA	Medium Earth	Navigation	In orbit	Operational
5 December; 00:19:20	Eighth Galileo launch with Soyuz ST-B, carrying satellites Nikolina and Shriya.					
7 December; 04:12	(China) Ceres-1	Y2	(China) Jiuquan LS-95A		(China) Galactic Energy	
7 December; 04:12	⚀ (China) Tianjin University-1	Chang Guang Satellite Technology / Tianjin Yunyao Aerospace	Low Earth (SSO)	Earth observation	In orbit	Operational
7 December; 04:12	⚀ (China) Baoyun	Spacety	Low Earth (SSO)	Technology demonstration Earth observation	In orbit	Operational
7 December; 04:12	⚀ (China) Lize-1	Spacety	Low Earth (SSO)	Technology demonstration	In orbit	Operational
7 December; 04:12	⚀ (China) Golden Bauhinia-1 03	ZeroG Lab / HKATG	Low Earth (SSO)	Earth observation	In orbit	Operational
7 December; 04:12	⚀ (China) Golden Bauhinia-5	Starwiz / HKATG	Low Earth (SSO)	Earth observation	In orbit	Operational
7 December; 04:12	Mission designated "Keep On Moving".					
7 December; 10:19	(United States) Atlas V 551	AV-093	(United States) Cape Canaveral SLC-41		(United States) ULA	
7 December; 10:19	(United States) STPSat-6	U.S. Space Force	Geosynchronous	Technology demonstration	In orbit	Operational
7 December; 10:19	(United States) LDPE-1	U.S. Space Force	Geosynchronous	ESPA; Technology demonstration	In orbit	Operational
7 December; 10:19	⚀ (United States) Ascent	AFRL	Geosynchronous	Technology demonstration	In orbit	Operational
7 December; 10:19	Space Test Program 3 (STP-3) mission. STPSat-6 hosts the Laser Communications Relay Demonstration (LCRD) payload. Ascent was deployed from LDPE-1 on 25 January 2022.					
8 December; 07:38:15	(Russia) Soyuz-2.1a		(Kazakhstan) Baikonur Site 31/6		(Russia) Roscosmos	
8 December; 07:38:15	(Russia) Soyuz MS-20	Roscosmos	Low Earth (ISS)	Space tourism	20 December; 03:13	Successful
8 December; 07:38:15	12-day mission to the ISS with a crew of three, including one professional cosmonaut and two tourists.					
9 December; 00:02:07	(United States) Electron	"A Data With Destiny"	(New Zealand) Mahia LC-1A		(United States) Rocket Lab	
9 December; 00:02:07	(United States) BlackSky 14 (Global-16)	BlackSky	Low Earth	Earth observation	In orbit	Operational
9 December; 00:02:07	(United States) BlackSky 15 (Global-17)	BlackSky	Low Earth	Earth observation	In orbit	Operational
9 December; 00:02:07	Third of four dedicated launches for BlackSky.					
9 December; 06:00	(United States) Falcon 9 Block 5	F9-131	(United States) Kennedy LC-39A		(United States) SpaceX	
9 December; 06:00	(United States) (Italy) IXPE	NASA / ASI	Low Earth	X-ray astronomy	In orbit	Operational
9 December; 06:00	Designated SMEX-14 under NASA's Small Explorers program.					
10 December; 00:11	(China) Long March 4B	4B-Y47	(China) Jiuquan SLS-2		(China) CASC	
10 December; 00:11	(China) Shijian-6 05A	CNSA	Low Earth (SSO)	ELINT	In orbit	Operational
10 December; 00:11	(China) Shijian-6 05B	CNSA	Low Earth (SSO)	ELINT	In orbit	Operational
10 December; 00:11	The 400th launch of the Long March series rocket.					
13 December; 12:07:00	(Russia) Proton-M / Briz-M		(Kazakhstan) Baikonur Site 200/39		(Russia) Roscosmos	
13 December; 12:07:00	(Russia) Ekspress-AMU3	RSCC	Geosynchronous	Communications	In orbit	Operational
13 December; 12:07:00	(Russia) Ekspress-AMU7	RSCC	Geosynchronous	Communications	In orbit	Operational
13 December; 12:07:00	Ekspress-AMU3 and AMU7 will replace Ekspress-AM33 and Ekspress-A4, respectively. This mission could also be considered as a partial launch failure. An anomaly occurred during the firing of the Briz-M upper stage, leaving the satellites in an out-specifications orbit, so that the satellites had to do salvage maneuvers to reach their intended orbits.					
13 December; 16:09	(China) Long March 3B/E	3B-Y82	(China) Xichang LC-3		(China) CASC	
13 December; 16:09	(China) Tianlian II-02	CNSA	Geosynchronous	Communications	In orbit	Operational
15 December; 02:00	(China) Kuaizhou 1A	Y17	(China) Jiuquan LS-95A		(China) ExPace	
15 December; 02:00	(China) GeeSAT-1A	Geespace	Low Earth	Navigation	15 December	Launch failure
15 December; 02:00	(China) GeeSAT-1B	Geespace	Low Earth	Navigation	15 December	Launch failure
18 December; 12:41:40	(United States) Falcon 9 Block 5	Starlink Group 4-4	(United States) Vandenberg SLC-4E		(United States) SpaceX	
18 December; 12:41:40	(United States) Starlink × 52	SpaceX	Low Earth	Communications	In orbit	Operational
18 December; 12:41:40	First time a Falcon 9 first stage booster flew for an eleventh time. First launch of Starlink Group 4 Satellites from Vandenberg.					
19 December; 03:58:39	(United States) Falcon 9 Block 5	F9-133	(United States) Cape Canaveral SLC-40		(United States) SpaceX	
19 December; 03:58:39	(Turkey) Türksat 5B	Türksat	Geosynchronous	Communications	In orbit	Operational
19 December; 03:58:39	New record for the shortest time between two SpaceX Falcon 9 launches at 15 hours and 17 minutes.					
21 December; 10:07:08	(United States) Falcon 9 Block 5	F9-134	(United States) Kennedy LC-39A		(United States) SpaceX	
21 December; 10:07:08	(United States) SpaceX CRS-24	NASA	Low Earth (ISS)	ISS logistics	24 January 2022; 21:05	Successful
21 December; 10:07:08	⚀ (United States) DAILI	The Aerospace Corporation	Low Earth	Ionospheric research	26 June 2022	Successful
21 December; 10:07:08	⚀ (Italy) FEES2	GP Advanced Projects	Low Earth	Technology demonstration	16 November 2022	Successful
21 December; 10:07:08	⚀ (United States) GASPACS	USU	Low Earth	Technology demonstration	22 May 2022	Successful
21 December; 10:07:08	⚀ (United States) GT-1	Georgia Tech	Low Earth	Technology demonstration	19 June 2022	Successful
21 December; 10:07:08	⚀ (United Arab Emirates) (Bahrain) Light-1	UAESA / NSSA	Low Earth	TGF research	16 January 2023	Successful
21 December; 10:07:08	⚀ (United States) PATCOOL	University of Florida / NASA	Low Earth	Technology demonstration	18 November 2022	Successful
21 December; 10:07:08	⚀ (United States) TARGIT	GTRC	Low Earth	Technology demonstration	3 May 2022	Successful
21 December; 10:07:08	Light-1 is the first Bahraini satellite (in partnership with the UAE). The ELaNa 38 mission, consisting of four CubeSats (DAILI, GASPACS, PATCOOL, and TARGIT), launched on this flight. FEES2, GASPACS, PATCOOL, DAILI, and TARGIT were deployed into orbit from ISS on 26 January 2022. Light-1 and GT-1 were deployed on 3 February 2022.					
22 December; 15:32:00	(Japan) H-IIA 204	F45	(Japan) Tanegashima LA-Y1		(Japan) MHI	
22 December; 15:32:00	(United Kingdom) Inmarsat-6 F1	Inmarsat	Geosynchronous	Communications	In orbit	Operational
23 December; 10:12	(China) Long March 7A	7A-Y3	(China) Wenchang LC-2		(China) CASC	
23 December; 10:12	(China) Shiyan 12-01	CAST	Geosynchronous	Technology demonstration	In orbit	Operational
23 December; 10:12	(China) Shiyan 12-02	CAST	Geosynchronous	Technology demonstration	In orbit	Operational
25 December; 12:20	(France) Ariane 5 ECA	VA256	(France) Kourou ELA-3		(France) Arianespace	
25 December; 12:20	(United States) (Canada) James Webb Space Telescope	NASA / ESA / CSA	Sun–Earth L_{2}, Halo orbit	Astronomy	In orbit	Operational
25 December; 12:20	International space observatory mission utilizing a long-wavelength visible and infrared telescope. Launching to L_{2}.					
26 December; 03:11:31	(China) Long March 4C	4C-Y39	(China) Taiyuan LC-9		(China) CASC	
26 December; 03:11:31	(China) Ziyuan I-02E	Ministry of Natural Resources	Low Earth (SSO)	Earth observation	In orbit	Operational
26 December; 03:11:31	⚀ (China) XW-3 (CAS-9)	CAMSAT	Low Earth (SSO)	Amateur radio	In orbit	Operational
27 December; 13:10:37	(Russia) Soyuz-2.1b / Fregat	ST37	(Kazakhstan) Baikonur Site 31/6		(France) Arianespace / (Russia) Starsem	
27 December; 13:10:37	(United Kingdom) OneWeb × 36	OneWeb	Low Earth	Communications	In orbit	Operational
27 December; 19:00	(Russia) Angara A5 / Persei		(Russia) Plesetsk Site 35/1		(Russia) RVSN RF	
27 December; 19:00	(Russia) IPN №1 (MGM №3)	Khrunichev	Intended: Geocentric supersynchronous Actual: Low Earth	Mass simulator	5 January 2022; 21:08	Partial launch failure
27 December; 19:00	Flight test of Persei, a Blok DM-03 upper stage variant for Angara. The upper stage failed to restart for its second planned burn, leaving itself and the dummy payload in a rapidly decaying low Earth orbit.					
29 December; 11:13	(China) Long March 2D	2D-Y41	(China) Jiuquan SLS-2		(China) CASC	
29 December; 11:13	(China) Tianhui-4	CNSA	Low Earth (Polar)	Earth observation	In orbit	Operational
29 December; 16:43:03	(China) Long March 3B/E	3B-Y84	(China) Xichang LC-2		(China) CASC	
29 December; 16:43:03	(China) TJS-9	CAST	Geosynchronous	SIGINT	In orbit	Operational
30 December; 03:30	(Iran) Simorgh		(Iran) Semnan LP-2		(Iran) ISA	
30 December; 03:30	(Iran) TBA	ISA	Low Earth	TBA	In orbit	Launch failure
30 December; 03:30	(Iran) TBA	ISA	Low Earth	TBA	In orbit	Launch failure
30 December; 03:30	(Iran) TBA	ISA	Low Earth	TBA	In orbit	Launch failure
30 December; 03:30	Iranian state media reported a successful flight, but no objects were detected in orbit following this launch. Reported apogee: 470 km (290 mi).					

- ← Jan
- Feb
- Mar
- Apr
- May
- Jun
- Jul
- Aug
- Sep
- Oct
- Nov
- Dec →

== Suborbital flights ==
Date and time (UTC)	Rocket	Flight number	Launch site		LSP	
Date and time (UTC)	Payload (⚀ = CubeSat)	Operator	Orbit	Function	Decay (UTC)	Outcome
Date and time (UTC)	Remarks					
3 July; 08:45:01	(Japan) Momo	F7	(Japan) Taiki		(Japan) Interstellar Technologies	
3 July; 08:45:01	(Japan) Infrasound sensor	Kochi University of Technology	Suborbital	Atmospheric research	3 July 2021; 08:55	Successful
3 July; 08:45:01	Apogee: 99–100 km (62 mi). Naming rights sold to Sunco Industries, which chose to name this vehicle Screw Rocket (ねじのロケット, Neji no Rocket) to draw attention to the large number of Sunco screws used on Momo rockets. A single rose from Hana-Cupid was also launched on this flight.					
7 July; 18:00	(Canada) Black Brant IX	Dynamo-2	(United States) Wallops Flight Facility		(United States) NASA	
7 July; 18:00	(United States) Dynamo-2	Goddard Space Flight Center	Suborbital	Atmospheric research	7 July	Successful
7 July; 18:00	Dynamos, Winds, and Electric Fields in the Daytime Lower Ionosphere-2 (Dynamo-2) mission to investigate the atmospheric dynamo. First of two launches. Apogee: 122 km (76 mi).					
7 July	(Russia) Target ballistic missile		(Russia)		(Russia)	
7 July	(Russia)	Ministry of Defence	Suborbital	Missile target	7 July	Successful
7 July	Intercepted by S-500 missile.					
7 July	(Russia) S-500		(Russia) Kapustin Yar		(Russia)	
7 July	(Russia) Kill vehicle	Ministry of Defence	Suborbital	Missile test	7 July	Successful
7 July	S-500 intercepted target ballistic missile.					
11 July; 15:25	(United States) SpaceShipTwo	Unity 22	(United States) Spaceport America		(United States) Virgin Galactic	
11 July; 15:25	(United States) Virgin Galactic Unity 22	Virgin Galactic	Suborbital	Crewed spaceflight	11 July; 15:38	Successful
11 July; 15:25	Apogee: 86.1 km (53.5 mi). Second VSS Unity test flight carrying two pilots and four passengers including company founder Richard Branson.					
11 July; 17:56	(Canada) Black Brant IX	Dynamo-2	(United States) Wallops Flight Facility		(United States) NASA	
11 July; 17:56	(United States) Dynamo-2	Goddard Space Flight Center	Suborbital	Atmospheric research	11 July	Successful
11 July; 17:56	Dynamos, Winds, and Electric Fields in the Daytime Lower Ionosphere-2 (Dynamo-2) mission to investigate the atmospheric dynamo. Second of two launches.					
16 July	(China) Reusable Suborbital Carrier		(China) Jiuquan		(China) CASC	
16 July		CASC	Suborbital	Test flight	16 July	Successful
16 July	First test flight of the Reusable Suborbital Carrier (亚轨道重复使用运载器). It successfully landed at Alxa Right Banner Badanjilin Airport.					
17 July	(Turkey) SORS		(Turkey) Sinop Test Center		(Turkey) Delta V	
17 July	(Turkey)	Roketsan	Suborbital	Test flight	17 July	Successful
17 July	Apogee: >50 mi (>80 km). First flight test of the Probe Rocket System (SORS).					
20 July; 13:11	(United States) New Shepard	NS-16	(United States) Corn Ranch		(United States) Blue Origin	
20 July; 13:11	(United States) Blue Origin NS-16	Blue Origin	Suborbital	Crewed spaceflight	20 July; 13:21	Successful
20 July; 13:11	First crewed flight of the New Shepard suborbital vehicle. Jeff Bezos and his brother Mark joined Wally Funk and Oliver Daemen on this flight. Apogee: 107 km (66 mi).					
24 July	(United States) SRBM	FTM-33	(United States) Barking Sands		(United States) U.S. Navy	
24 July	(United States)	U.S Navy	Suborbital	Missile target	24 July	Successful
24 July	Flight Test Aegis Weapon System 33, a test of the Aegis Ballistic Missile Defense System. Mock short-range ballistic missiles used as targets for SM-6 Dual II interceptors. One missile was confirmed to have been intercepted while the other was not. (1 of 2).					
24 July	(United States) SRBM	FTM-33	(United States) Barking Sands		(United States) U.S. Navy	
24 July	(United States)	U.S Navy	Suborbital	Missile target	24 July	Successful
24 July	Flight Test Aegis Weapon System 33, a test of the Aegis Ballistic Missile Defense System. Mock short-range ballistic missiles used as targets for SM-6 Dual II interceptors. One missile was confirmed to have been intercepted while the other was not. (2 of 2).					
24 July	(United States) SM-6 Dual II	FTM-33	(United States) USS Ralph Johnson		(United States) U.S. Navy	
24 July	(United States) Kill vehicle	U.S Navy	Suborbital	Interceptor	24 July	Successful
24 July	Flight Test Aegis Weapon System 33, a test of the Aegis Ballistic Missile Defense System. Interceptor targeting two mock short-range ballistic missiles. (1 of 4)					
24 July	(United States) SM-6 Dual II	FTM-33	(United States) USS Ralph Johnson		(United States) U.S. Navy	
24 July	(United States) Kill vehicle	U.S Navy	Suborbital	Interceptor	24 July	Successful
24 July	Flight Test Aegis Weapon System 33, a test of the Aegis Ballistic Missile Defense System. Interceptor targeting two mock short-range ballistic missiles. (2 of 4)					
24 July	(United States) SM-6 Dual II	FTM-33	(United States) USS Ralph Johnson		(United States) U.S. Navy	
24 July	(United States) Kill vehicle	U.S Navy	Suborbital	Interceptor	24 July	Successful
24 July	Flight Test Aegis Weapon System 33, a test of the Aegis Ballistic Missile Defense System. Interceptor targeting two mock short-range ballistic missiles. (3 of 4)					
24 July	(United States) SM-6 Dual II	FTM-33	(United States) USS Ralph Johnson		(United States) U.S. Navy	
24 July	(United States) Kill vehicle	U.S Navy	Suborbital	Interceptor	24 July	Successful
24 July	Flight Test Aegis Weapon System 33, a test of the Aegis Ballistic Missile Defense System. Interceptor targeting two mock short-range ballistic missiles. (4 of 4)					
26 July; 20:30	(Japan) S-520	S-520-31	(Japan) Uchinoura		(Japan) JAXA	
26 July; 20:30	(Japan) DES Demonstration	JAXA	Suborbital	Technology demonstration	26 July; 20:38	Successful
26 July; 20:30	Apogee: 235 km (146 mi). Detonation engine system (DES) technology demonstration, combining pulse detonation engine and rotating detonation engine technologies.					
28 July	(United States) AGM-183 ARRW	ARRW BTF-1	(United States) Boeing B-52 Stratofortress		(United States) U.S. Air Force	
28 July	(United States) Booster Test Vehicle 1b (BTV-1b)	U.S. Air Force	Suborbital	Flight test	28 July	Launch failure
28 July	Solid rocket motor failed to ignite after airdropped over the Point Mugu Sea Range.					
30 July; 18:20	(Canada) Black Brant IX	MaGIXS	(United States) White Sands Missile Range		(United States) NASA	
30 July; 18:20	(United States) Marshall Grazing Incidence X-ray Spectrometer	Marshall Space Flight Center	Suborbital	Heliophysics	30 July	Successful
30 July; 18:20	Apogee: 308 km (191 mi).					
31 July; 08:00	(Japan) Momo	F6	(Japan) Taiki		(Japan) Interstellar Technologies	
31 July; 08:00	(Japan) TENGA Message Pod	Tenga	Suborbital	Space advertising	31 July; 08:10	Successful
31 July; 08:00	(Japan) TENGA Robo	Tenga	Suborbital	Space advertising	31 July; 08:10	Successful
31 July; 08:00	Apogee: 92 km (57 mi). First of three Interstellar Technologies launches sponsored by Tenga. Flew after Momo F7.					
11 August; 07:53	(United States) Minuteman-III		(United States) Vandenberg LF-09		(United States) U.S. Air Force	
11 August; 07:53	(United States) HFJTA reentry vehicle	U.S. Air Force	Suborbital	Test flight	11 August	Successful
11 August; 07:53	Hi-Fidelity Joint Test Assembly (HFJTA) reentry vehicle successfully detonated approximately 4,200 mi (6,800 km) downrange near Kwajalein Atoll in the Marshall Islands.					
11 August; 14:44	(United States) SpaceLoft XL	SL-16	(United States) Spaceport America		(United States) UP Aerospace	
11 August; 14:44	(United States) ReDX-1	Los Alamos National Laboratory	Suborbital	Technology demonstration	11 August	Successful
11 August; 14:44	Mission SL-16. Apogee: 100 km (62 mi).					
12 August	(Pakistan) Ghaznavi		(Pakistan)		(Pakistan) ASFC	
12 August	(Pakistan)	ASFC	Suborbital	Missile test	12 August	Successful
12 August	(United States) Economical Target-2		(United States) White Sands Missile Range		(United States) SMDC	
12 August	(United States)	SMDC	Suborbital	Target missile	12 August	Successful
12 August	First launch of the Economical Target-2.					
13 August	(China)		(China)		(China)	
13 August	(China) Hypersonic test	PLARF	Suborbital	Hypersonic glide vehicle test	13 August	Successful
19 August; 21:00	(United States) Terrier-Improved Malemute	ROCKSAT-X 2020	(United States) Wallops Flight Facility		(United States) NASA	
19 August; 21:00	(United States) RockSat-X	Colorado Space Grant Consortium	Suborbital	Education	19 August	Successful
19 August; 21:00	Apogee: 98 mi (158 km).					
21 August	(China) DF-15		(China) Gobi Desert		(China) PLA Rocket Force	
21 August	(China) Live warhead	PLA	Suborbital	Missile test	21 August	Successful
21 August	Missile test (1 of 2).					
21 August	(China) DF-15		(China) Gobi Desert		(China) PLA Rocket Force	
21 August	(China) Live warhead	PLA	Suborbital	Missile test	21 August	Successful
21 August	Missile test (2 of 2).					
26 August; 14:31	(United States) New Shepard	NS-17	(United States) Corn Ranch		(United States) Blue Origin	
26 August; 14:31	(United States) Blue Origin NS-17	Blue Origin	Suborbital	Uncrewed commercial spaceflight	26 August; 14:41	Successful
26 August; 14:31	(Bulgaria) (Principality of Sealand) (United States) Postcards	Club For The Future	Suborbital	Education	26 August; 14:41	Successful
26 August; 14:31	Uncrewed flight of New Shepard that will carry 18 commercial payloads inside the crew capsule, 11 of which are NASA-supported, and an art installation by Ghanaian artist Amoako Boafo on the exterior of the capsule. Apogee: 65.8 mi (105.9 km).					
31 August; 03:30	(China) Tianxing 2	Y4	(China)		(China) Space Transportation	
31 August; 03:30	(China)	Space Transportation	Suborbital	Flight test	31 August	Successful
31 August; 03:30	Test flight of the Tianxing 2 suborbital spaceplane.					
4 September	(Yemen) Zulfiqar		(Yemen)		(Yemen) Houthis	
4 September	(Yemen) Live warhead	Houthis	Suborbital	Missile launch	4 September	Intercepted
4 September	Successful launch. Warhead was intercepted.					
9 September; 17:25	(Canada) Black Brant IX		(United States) White Sands Missile Range		(United States) NASA	
9 September; 17:25	(United States) SDO EVE Underflight Calibration Experiment	CU Boulder	Suborbital	Satellite instrument calibration	9 September	Successful
9 September; 17:25	Launched a copy of the EVE instrument on NASA's Solar Dynamics Observatory for calibration purposes. Apogee: 182 mi (293 km).					
11 September; 22:07:30	(United States) Terrier-Improved Malemute		(United States) Wallops Flight Facility		(United States) NASA	
11 September; 22:07:30	(United States) HOTShot	Sandia National Laboratories	Suborbital	Flight test	11 September	Successful
11 September; 22:07:30	Apogee: 99 mi (159 km).					
12 September; 00:45	(China) Tianxing 1	Y8	(China)		(China) Space Transportation	
12 September; 00:45	(China)	Space Transportation	Suborbital	Flight test	12 September	Successful
12 September; 00:45	Test flight of the Tianxing 1 suborbital spaceplane.					
12 September; 17:30	(United States) Ground-Based Interceptor	BVT-03	(United States) Vandenberg LF-24		(United States) MDA	
12 September; 17:30	(United States) EKV mock-up	MDA	Suborbital	ABM flight test	12 September	Successful
12 September; 17:30	Booster Verification Test 03 (BVT-03) for the Ground-Based Midcourse Defense system. A mock-up Exoatmospheric Kill Vehicle (EKV) was flown.					
15 September	(South Korea) Hyunmoo-4-4		(South Korea) ROKS Dosan Ahn Changho		(South Korea) ROK Navy	
15 September	(South Korea)	ROK Navy	Suborbital	Missile test	15 September	Successful
15 September	First successful South Korean SLBM test launch.					
16 September; 06:39	(Taiwan) Hapith I	VS01	(Australia) Whalers Way Pad 1		(Taiwan) TiSPACE	
16 September; 06:39	(Taiwan) Ionosphere Scintillation Package (ISP)	NSPO	Suborbital	Ionospheric scintillation research	16 September	Precluded
16 September; 06:39	Maiden flight of Hapith I and first of three test launches from Pad 1 at Whalers Way. Launch failure at ignition. Intended apogee: 250 km (160 mi).					
17 September	(United States) UGM-133 Trident II	DASO-31	(United States) USS Wyoming (SSBN-742)		(United States) U.S. Navy	
17 September	(United States)	U.S. Navy	Suborbital	Missile test	17 September	Successful
17 September	1 of 2.					
17 September	(United States) UGM-133 Trident II	DASO-31	(United States) USS Wyoming (SSBN-742)		(United States) U.S. Navy	
17 September	(United States)	U.S. Navy	Suborbital	Missile test	17 September	Successful
17 September	2 of 2.					
27 September; 00:33	(China) Tianxing 1	Y5	(China)		(China) Space Transportation	
27 September; 00:33	(China)	Space Transportation	Suborbital	Flight test	27 September	Successful
27 September; 00:33	Test flight of the Tianxing 1 suborbital spaceplane.					
1–3 October	(United States) Improved Malemute		(Norway) Andøya		(Norway) Andøya Space	
1–3 October	(Germany) PMWE	IAP	Suborbital	Mesospheric research	1–3 October	Successful
1–3 October	Multiple Improved Malemute launches for the Polar Mesosphere Winter Echoes (PMWE) experiment. (1 of 2)					
1–3 October	(United States) Improved Malemute		(Norway) Andøya		(Norway) Andøya Space	
1–3 October	(Germany) PMWE	IAP	Suborbital	Mesospheric research	1–3 October	Successful
1–3 October	Multiple Improved Malemute launches for the Polar Mesosphere Winter Echoes (PMWE) experiment. (2 of 2)					
3 October	(Netherlands) T-Minus DART		(Norway) Andøya		(Netherlands) T-Minus Engineering	
3 October	(Netherlands) Qualification payload	T-minus Engineering	Suborbital	Mesospheric research	3 October	Failure
3 October	Rocket failed at high supersonic speeds and did not deploy the payload.					
8 October; 17:40	(Canada) Black Brant IX		(United States) White Sands Missile Range		(United States) NASA	
8 October; 17:40	(United States) CLASP-2.1	NASA MSFC	Suborbital	Heliophysics	8 October	Successful
8 October; 17:40	Chromospheric LAyer SpectroPolarimeter Reflight (CLASP-2.1) will map the circular polarization of the chromosphere. Third flight for this instrument. Apogee: 272 km (169 mi).					
13 October; 14:49	(United States) New Shepard	NS-18	(United States) Corn Ranch		(United States) Blue Origin	
13 October; 14:49	(United States) Blue Origin NS-18	Blue Origin	Suborbital	Crewed spaceflight	13 October; 14:59	Successful
13 October; 14:49	Second crewed flight of New Shepard. William Shatner flew on this mission, becoming the oldest person to have flown to space at the age of 90. Apogee: 107 km (66 mi).					
20–21 October; 21:00–03:00	(United States) Terrier Malemute		(United States) Wallops Flight Facility		(United States) NASA	
20–21 October; 21:00–03:00	(United States)	Sandia National Laboratories	Suborbital	Technology demonstration	20–21 October	Successful
20–21 October; 21:00–03:00	1 of 3. High Operational Tempo for Hypersonics flight campaign.					
20–21 October; 21:00–03:00	(United States) Terrier Malemute		(United States) Wallops Flight Facility		(United States) NASA	
20–21 October; 21:00–03:00	(United States)	Sandia National Laboratories	Suborbital	Technology demonstration	20–21 October	Successful
20–21 October; 21:00–03:00	2 of 3. High Operational Tempo for Hypersonics flight campaign.					
20–21 October; 21:00–03:00	(United States) Terrier Malemute		(United States) Wallops Flight Facility		(United States) NASA	
20–21 October; 21:00–03:00	(United States)	Sandia National Laboratories	Suborbital	Technology demonstration	20–21 October	Successful
20–21 October; 21:00–03:00	3 of 3. High Operational Tempo for Hypersonics flight campaign.					
21 October	(United States) STARS-4 ?	FT-3	(United States) Kodiak		(United States) Department of Defense	
21 October	(United States)	Department of Defense	Suborbital	Missile test	21 October	Launch failure
21 October	Hypersonic Flight Test-3 (FT-3). Booster failed in flight.					
21 October	(Russia) Bulava		(Russia) Knyaz Oleg, White Sea		(Russia) Ministry of Defence	
21 October	(Russia)	Ministry of Defence	Suborbital	Missile test	21 October	Successful
27 October; 14:20	(India) Agni-V		(India) Integrated Test Range		(India) Ministry of Defence	
27 October; 14:20	(India)	Ministry of Defence	Suborbital	Missile test	27 October	Successful
4 November; 10:09:25	(Japan) SS-520	SS-520-3	(Norway) SvalRak		(Japan) JAXA	
4 November; 10:09:25	(Japan) Ion Outflow in the Cusp	JAXA	Suborbital	Magnetospheric science	4 November; 10:25:15	Successful
4 November; 10:09:25	JAXA's contribution to the Grand Challenge Initiative–Cusp (GCI-Cusp) project. Apogee: 956 km (594 mi).					
8 November; 09:25	(Canada) Black Brant IX		(United States) White Sands Missile Range		(United States) NASA	
8 November; 09:25	(United States) SISTINE-2	CU Boulder	Suborbital	UV spectroscopy	8 November	Successful
8 November; 09:25	Apogee: 258 km (160 mi).					
15 November; ~02:45	(Russia) PL-19 Nudol		(Russia) Plesetsk		(Russia) Ministry of Defence	
15 November; ~02:45	(Russia)	Ministry of Defence	Suborbital	ASAT missile test	15 November	Successful
15 November; ~02:45	Anti-satellite missile test, destroying the defunct Kosmos 1408 satellite.					
25 November	(Pakistan) Shaheen 1-A		(Pakistan)		(Pakistan) ASFC	
25 November	(Pakistan)	ASFC	Suborbital	Missile test	25 November	Successful
1 December; 08:25	(United States) Talos Terrier Oriole Nihka (Oriole IV)		(Norway) Andøya		(United States) NASA	
1 December; 08:25	(United States) CREX-2	University of Alaska Fairbanks	Suborbital	Magnetospheric research	1 December	Successful
1 December; 08:25	Last launch of the Grand Challenge Initiative–Cusp (GCI-Cusp) project. Apogee: 392 mi (631 km).					
6 December; 08:07	(United States) Improved Malemute/Improved Malemute	MAPHEUS 10	(Sweden) Esrange		(Germany) MORABA	
6 December; 08:07	(Germany) MAPHEUS 10	DLR	Suborbital	Microgravity research	6 December; 08:22	Successful
6 December; 08:07	Apogee: 259 km (161 mi).					
6 December	(Yemen) Zulfiqar		(Yemen)		(Yemen) Houthis	
6 December	(Yemen) Live warhead	Houthis	Suborbital	Missile launch	6 December	Intercepted
6 December	Successful launch. Warhead was intercepted.					
9 December; 02:17	(China) Tianxing 1	Y5B	(China)		(China) Space Transportation	
9 December; 02:17	(China)	Space Transportation	Suborbital	Flight test	9 December	Successful
9 December; 02:17	Test flight of the Tianxing 1 suborbital spaceplane.					
9 December	(South Korea) Blue Whale 0.1		(South Korea) Jeju Island		(South Korea) Perigee Aerospace	
9 December	(South Korea)	Perigee Aerospace / KAIST	Suborbital	Flight test	5 December	Successful?
9 December	First flight of Blue Whale 0.1					
11 December; 15:00:42	(United States) New Shepard	NS-19	(United States) Corn Ranch		(United States) Blue Origin	
11 December; 15:00:42	(United States) Blue Origin NS-19	Blue Origin	Suborbital	Crewed spaceflight	11 December; 15:10:55	Successful
11 December; 15:00:42	Third crewed flight of New Shepard. First flight carrying a full manifest of six passengers. Apogee: 107 km (66 mi).					
14 December	(Brazil) VSB-30	V32	(Brazil) Alcântara Space Center		(Brazil) FAB	
14 December	(Brazil) Hypersonic glide vehicle	FAB	Suborbital	Technology demonstration	14 December	Successful
14 December	14-XS mission. Apogee: 160 km (99 mi).					
17 December; 06:30	(China) Huayi-1		(China)		(China) Huayi Spacetime	
17 December; 06:30	(China) Agile Testbed / Sparkle-1	Rocket Pi	Suborbital	Microgravity research	17 December	Successful
17 December; 06:30	Maiden flight of the Huayi-1 sounding rocket. Apogee: 250 km (160 mi).					
17 December	(China) Tianxing 2	Y5	(China)		(China) Space Transportation	
17 December	(China)	Space Transportation	Suborbital	Flight test	17 December	Successful
17 December	Test flight of the Tianxing 2 suborbital spaceplane.					
18 December; 05:36	(India) Agni-P		(India) Integrated Test Range		(India) Ministry of Defence	
18 December; 05:36	(India)	Ministry of Defence	Suborbital	Missile test	18 December	Successful
19 December	(China) Tianxing 2	Y5	(China)		(China) Space Transportation	
19 December	(China)	Space Transportation	Suborbital	Flight test	19 December	Successful
19 December	Test flight of the Tianxing 2 suborbital spaceplane and first reuse of the same spaceplane in two different test flights.					
22 December	(India) Pralay		(India) Integrated Test Range		(India) Ministry of Defence	
22 December	(India)	Ministry of Defence	Suborbital	Missile test	22 December	Successful
22 December	Launch of two Pralay missiles. (1 of 2)					
23 December	(India) Pralay		(India) Integrated Test Range		(India) Ministry of Defence	
23 December	(India)	Ministry of Defence	Suborbital	Missile test	23 December	Successful
23 December	Launch of two Pralay missiles. (2 of 2)					
24 December	(Iran) Sajil		(Iran)		(Iran) IRGC	
24 December	(Iran) Live warhead	IRGC	Suborbital	Missile test	24 December	Successful
24 December	(Iran) Emad		(Iran)		(Iran) IRGC	
24 December	(Iran) Live warhead	IRGC	Suborbital	Missile test	24 December	Successful
24 December	(Iran) Ghader		(Iran)		(Iran) IRGC	
24 December	(Iran) Live warhead	IRGC	Suborbital	Missile test	24 December	Successful
24 December	Launch of two Ghader missiles in close succession. (1 of 2)					
24 December	(Iran) Ghader		(Iran)		(Iran) IRGC	
24 December	(Iran) Live warhead	IRGC	Suborbital	Missile test	24 December	Successful
24 December	Launch of two Ghader missiles in close succession. (2 of 2)					
24 December	(Iran) Zalzal		(Iran)		(Iran) IRGC	
24 December	(Iran) Live warhead	IRGC	Suborbital	Missile test	24 December	Successful
24 December	(Iran) Dezful/Zolfaghar		(Iran)		(Iran) IRGC	
24 December	(Iran) Live warhead	IRGC	Suborbital	Missile test	24 December	Successful
24 December	Rapid launch of 11 Dezful/Zolfaghar missiles. (1 of 11)					
24 December	(Iran) Dezful/Zolfaghar		(Iran)		(Iran) IRGC	
24 December	(Iran) Live warhead	IRGC	Suborbital	Missile test	24 December	Successful
24 December	Rapid launch of 11 Dezful/Zolfaghar missiles. (2 of 11)					
24 December	(Iran) Dezful/Zolfaghar		(Iran)		(Iran) IRGC	
24 December	(Iran) Live warhead	IRGC	Suborbital	Missile test	24 December	Successful
24 December	Rapid launch of 11 Dezful/Zolfaghar missiles. (3 of 11)					
24 December	(Iran) Dezful/Zolfaghar		(Iran)		(Iran) IRGC	
24 December	(Iran) Live warhead	IRGC	Suborbital	Missile test	24 December	Successful
24 December	Rapid launch of 11 Dezful/Zolfaghar missiles. (4 of 11)					
24 December	(Iran) Dezful/Zolfaghar		(Iran)		(Iran) IRGC	
24 December	(Iran) Live warhead	IRGC	Suborbital	Missile test	24 December	Successful
24 December	Rapid launch of 11 Dezful/Zolfaghar missiles. (5 of 11)					
24 December	(Iran) Dezful/Zolfaghar		(Iran)		(Iran) IRGC	
24 December	(Iran) Live warhead	IRGC	Suborbital	Missile test	24 December	Successful
24 December	Rapid launch of 11 Dezful/Zolfaghar missiles. (6 of 11)					
24 December	(Iran) Dezful/Zolfaghar		(Iran)		(Iran) IRGC	
24 December	(Iran) Live warhead	IRGC	Suborbital	Missile test	24 December	Successful
24 December	Rapid launch of 11 Dezful/Zolfaghar missiles. (7 of 11)					
24 December	(Iran) Dezful/Zolfaghar		(Iran)		(Iran) IRGC	
24 December	(Iran) Live warhead	IRGC	Suborbital	Missile test	24 December	Successful
24 December	Rapid launch of 11 Dezful/Zolfaghar missiles. (8 of 11)					
24 December	(Iran) Dezful/Zolfaghar		(Iran)		(Iran) IRGC	
24 December	(Iran) Live warhead	IRGC	Suborbital	Missile test	24 December	Successful
24 December	Rapid launch of 11 Dezful/Zolfaghar missiles. (9 of 11)					
24 December	(Iran) Dezful/Zolfaghar		(Iran)		(Iran) IRGC	
24 December	(Iran) Live warhead	IRGC	Suborbital	Missile test	24 December	Successful
24 December	Rapid launch of 11 Dezful/Zolfaghar missiles. (10 of 11)					
24 December	(Iran) Dezful/Zolfaghar		(Iran)		(Iran) IRGC	
24 December	(Iran) Live warhead	IRGC	Suborbital	Missile test	24 December	Successful
24 December	Rapid launch of 11 Dezful/Zolfaghar missiles. (11 of 11)					
29 December	(South Korea) Blue Whale 0.1		(South Korea) Jeju Island		(South Korea) Perigee Aerospace	
29 December	(South Korea)	Perigee Aerospace / KAIST	Suborbital	Flight test	29 December	Launch failure
29 December	Test flight of a suborbital rocket to validate the engines for the Blue Whale 1 launch vehicle. Expected apogee: 100 km (62 mi). Flight was terminated shortly after launch due to unexpectedly strong winds.					
30 December; 04:40	(China) Tianxing ?		(China)		(China) Space Transportation	
30 December; 04:40	(China)	Space Transportation	Suborbital	Flight test	30 December	Successful
30 December; 04:40	Test flight of the Tianxing suborbital spaceplane.					
Late December	(Russia) S-500		(Russia) Kapustin Yar		(Russia)	
Late December	(Russia) Kill vehicle	Ministry of Defence	Suborbital	Missile test	Late December	Successful
Late December	S-500 intercepted target ballistic missile.					
