= 2021 in spaceflight =

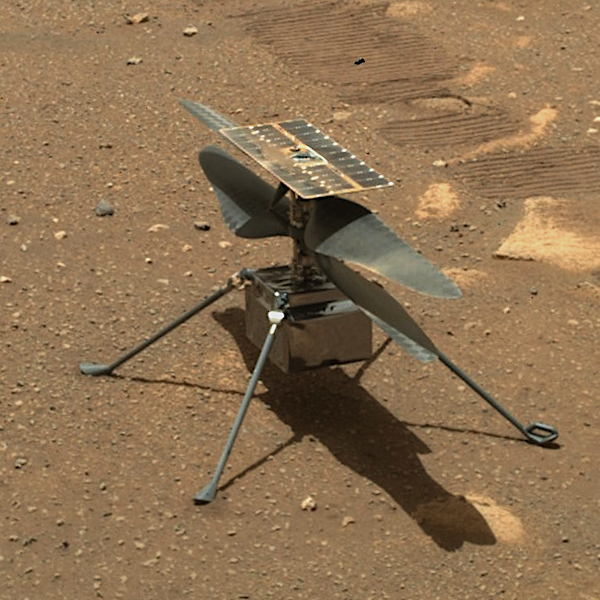
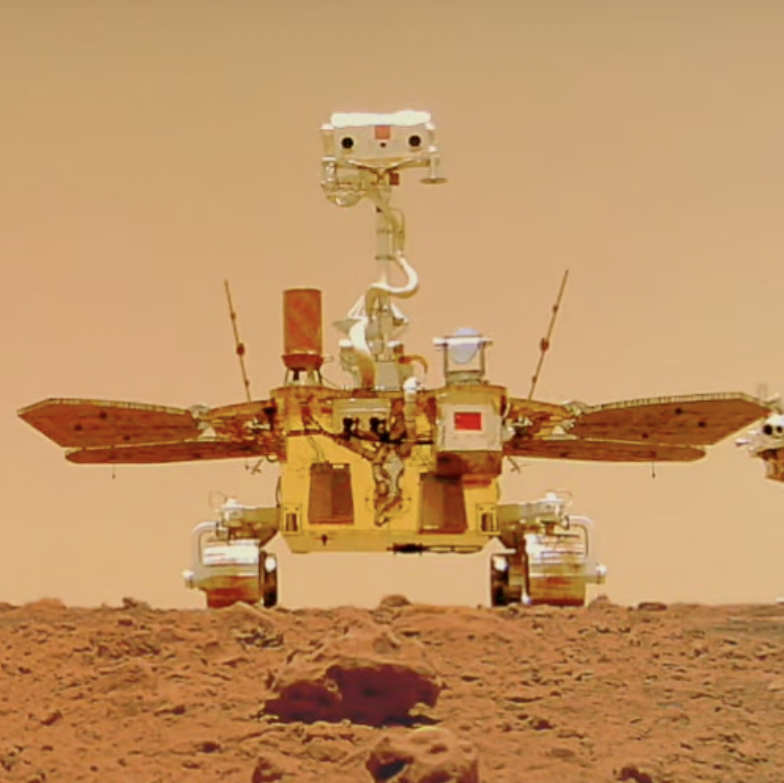
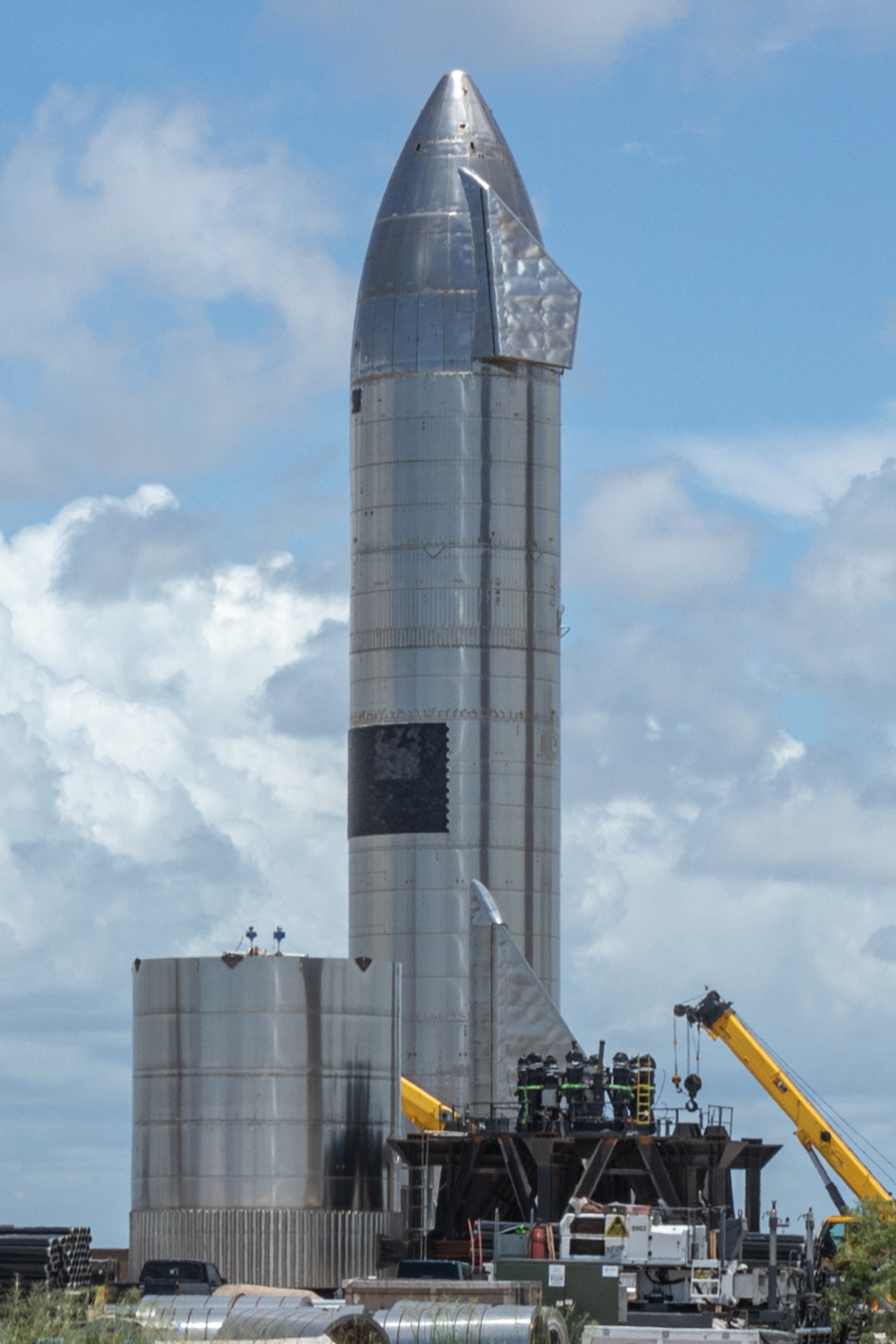
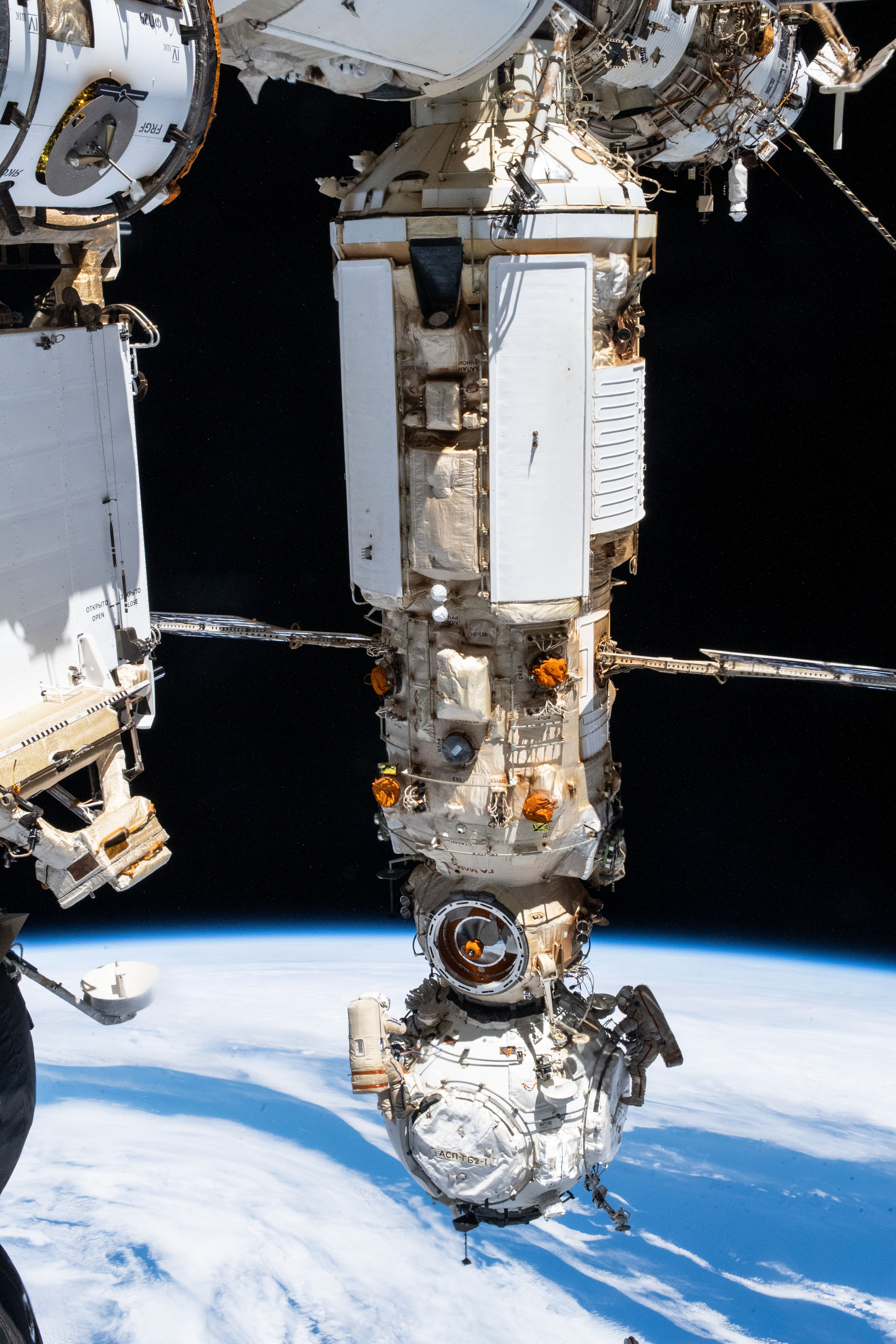
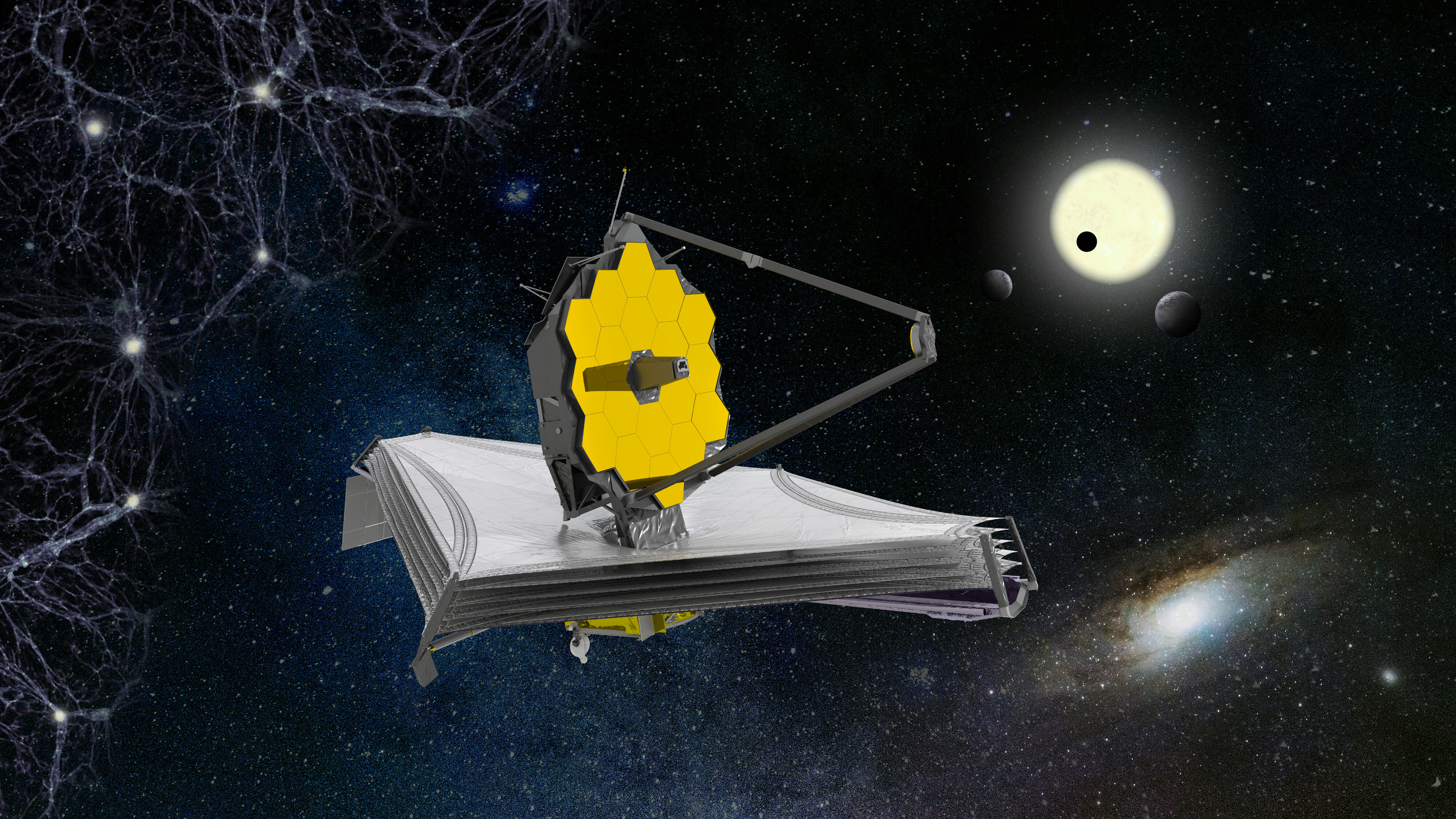
- Highlights from spaceflight in 2021 (Note: Clockwise from top-left: Numerous spacecraft reach Mars during the 2020–21 transit window, including the first rotorcraft on an extraterrestrial body (left) and the first Chinese rover on Mars (right).; The long-anticipated Nauka and Prichal modules are delivered to the International Space Station.; The next-generation James Webb Space Telescope is launched after two decades in development.; SpaceX conducts the first ever successful launch, landing, and recovery of a Starship prototype.)

Orbital launches
- First: 8 January
- Last: 30 December
- Total: 146
- Successes: 135
- Failures: 10
- Partial failures: 1
- Catalogued: 133

National firsts
- Spaceflight: British Antarctic Territory (first payload)
- Satellite: Myanmar; Paraguay; Tunisia; Kuwait; Bahrain (in partnership with the UAE)
- Space traveller: Australia

Rockets
- Maiden flights: Alpha; Angara A5 / Persei; Nuri
- Retirements: H-IIA 204

Crewed flights
- Orbital: 8
- Orbital travellers: 27
- Suborbital: 5
- Suborbital travellers: 21
- Total travellers: 48
- EVAs: 17

2021 in spaceflight

The year 2021 broke the record for the most orbital launch attempts till then (146) and most humans in space concurrently (19) despite the effects of COVID-19 pandemic.

== Overview ==
=== Astronomy and astrophysics ===
The IXPE telescope was launched on a Falcon 9 on 9 December 2021. The long-delayed James Webb Space Telescope, the largest optical space telescope ever built, was launched to the Sun–Earth L_{2} point by a European Ariane 5 rocket on 25 December 2021.

=== Planetary science ===
Spacecraft from three Mars exploration programs from the United Arab Emirates, China, and the United States (Hope, Tianwen-1, and Mars 2020) arrived at Mars in February.

The Perseverance rover landed on 18 February. As part of the Mars 2020 mission, the Ingenuity solar-powered drone performed the first powered aircraft flight on another planet in human history. It has a communications link with the Perseverance rover and used autonomous control during its short scripted flights.

The Tianwen-1 lander and Zhurong rover landed on 14 May, after conducting a geological survey of the landing site from orbit. Zhurong was deployed on the Martian surface on 22 May, making China the second country in history to successfully deploy a rover on Mars. The rover then dropped a remotely controlled camera on the ground, which took a group photo of the lander and rover on 1 June.

Lucy, a NASA space probe, was launched on 16 October and began a 12-year journey to seven different asteroids, visiting six Jupiter trojans, and one Main Belt asteroid. Trojans are asteroids which share Jupiter's orbit around the Sun, orbiting either ahead of or behind the planet.

The Double Asteroid Redirection Test (DART) was launched on 24 November. It was a space probe that visited the double asteroid Didymos and demonstrated the kinetic effects of crashing an impactor spacecraft into an asteroid moon for planetary defense purposes. The mission was intended to test whether a spacecraft impact could successfully deflect an asteroid on a collision course with Earth.

The Juno probe continues its exploration of Jupiter. Originally, its mission was intended to conclude on 31 July by burning up in Jupiter's atmosphere following its 35th perijove. However, on 8 January 2021, NASA announced that the probe was granted a second mission extension through September 2025, which could include future flybys of Europa and Io.

Lastly the Tianwen-1 orbiter released another deployable camera in Mars orbit on 31 December 2021, to image itself and Northern Mars Ice Cap from Mars orbit.

=== Lunar exploration ===
China's Chang'e-4 lander and Yutu-2 rover reached 1000-days milestone on the far side of the Moon while still being operational.

=== Earth science satellites ===
The Landsat 9 Earth observation satellite was launched 27 September.

=== Human spaceflight ===
The first feature-length fiction film to be filmed in space (some scenes) by professional film-makers, the Russian film The Challenge was filmed onboard ISS in October 2021 by Russian director Klim Shipenko with actress Yulia Peresild starring. (Note: Claims about "first film in space" are dubius as other films have been filmed in space previously, like the feature-length narrative fiction film Return from Orbit (1984; some scenes filmed in space) and the narrative fiction short film Apogee of Fear (2012; completely filmed in space). In the film Return from Orbit the scenes filmed in space included important characters (not just "background"); the characters were portrayed by cosmonauts, not the "usual" professional actors portraying those characters, in the scenes that were filmed in actual space. As Return from Orbit was also filmed by movie professionals (except those scenes filmed in space, which were filmed by cosmonauts) and released into cinemas for wide audience, it has a good claim to the title "first movie in space"; the only relevant difference with The Challenge (2023) is that in the case of Return from Orbit, all professional film-makers stayed on the ground, whereas in the case of The Challenge, some professional film-makers flew to ISS to film some scenes for the movie. Also full feature length documentary films that have been released to movie theaters, like For All Mankind (1989) or A Beautiful Planet (2016; a film long enough to be a feature film according to many but not all definitions of feature film) have been filmed in space. The Challenge is however the first time a professional actor/ess has been filmed in space by a professional director, as other films before were filmed and acted in by astronauts/cosmonauts/space tourists (space tourists that were amateur both in film-making and as astronauts) or used footage from automated equipment. Apogee of Fear was written by a professional scriptwriter, and with some graphics assets done by a professional, but had no other filming professionals involved.)

A new record was set for the largest number of humans in orbit (14) on 16 September 2021, and a new record for the largest number of humans in space (19) at one time (10 in the ISS, 3 on board the Tiangong Space Station, 6 on board New Shepard-19) was set on 11 December 2021.

==== Space Stations ====
China began construction of the Tiangong space station (phase 3 of the Tiangong program) with the launch of the Tianhe core module on 29 April 2021. A Tianzhou cargo delivery mission was launched on 29 May 2021, and the Shenzhou 12 crewed mission on 17 June 2021. Shenzhou 13 has launched a second crew on 15 October and conducted their first EVA on 7 November, making Wang Yaping the first Chinese female astronaut to perform a spacewalk.

The ISS saw one module being permanently removed from the orbiting complex and two new modules being added. Pirs became the first habitable element of the station to be decommissioned, undocked, and deorbited on 26 July 2021 to make room for Nauka, the first new module in the Russian Orbital Segment of ISS (indeed, first new module for the whole of ISS) in years. The Russian made Nauka module was launched from Baikonur Cosmodrome on 21 July 2021. Nauka carried the European Robotic Arm (ERA) along with it to the station. The ISS was also joined by a new Russian node module Prichal, launched 24 November 2021.

==== Space tourism ====
In the United States, Virgin Galactic conducted the first suborbital human spaceflight from New Mexico on 22 May 2021 with SpaceShipTwo VSS Unity. Two astronauts were on board, Frederick Sturckow and David Mackay. The flight was also the first suborbital human spaceflight from Spaceport America. A second flight, carrying company founder Richard Branson and three other passengers, was conducted on 11 July 2021.

The first crewed flight of Blue Origin's New Shepard suborbital spacecraft successfully sent four civilians, including company founder Jeff Bezos, into space just above the Kármán line on 20 July 2021. Blue Origin's second crewed suborbital flight of New Shepard occurred 13 October 2021, this time not including Bezos but the actor William Shatner and 3 others. The third flight of Blue Origin's New Shepard, again a suborbital flight, took place 11 December 2021. This was the first flight with six passengers on board, the full number of passengers the New Shepard is designed for.

On 16 September 2021 SpaceX launched the Inspiration4 mission. The mission successfully completed the first orbital spaceflight with only private citizens aboard. The mission was privately financed by Jared Isaacman who participated in the flight with 3 other passengers (the others did not pay for their flight). The mission orbited the Earth at high orbit (higher than ISS) and splashed down in the Atlantic, lasting almost three days.

On 8 December 2021 the Russian Soyuz MS-20 spacecraft began a 12-day space tourism mission to ISS, resuming space tourism activity in the ISS after over a decade; the previous space tourist to visit the station was the Canadian Guy Laliberté in 2009. The 2021 space tourist mission took two tourists, the Japanese billionaire Yusaku Maezawa and his assistant Yozo Hirano, to the station.

=== Rocket innovation ===
The trend towards cost reduction in access to orbit continued with the continued development of smaller rockets by multiple commercial launch providers and larger next-generation vehicles by more established players.

While multiple high-profile next-generation rockets were originally planned to make their maiden orbital flights in 2021, all were ultimately shifted to 2022 and beyond due to development delays. These included the maiden flight of Vulcan Centaur, designed to gradually replace Atlas V and Delta IV Heavy at lower costs, which was postponed in June 2021; the Mitsubishi Heavy Industries's H3 launch vehicle, planned to cost less than half that of its predecessor H-IIA; the maiden launch of NASA's Space Launch System (SLS) super heavy-lift rocket on the Artemis 1, which was postponed mid-year to early 2022; and the first orbital test flight of a prototype of the SpaceX Starship.

The latter rocket's development continued through 2021 at SpaceX's facility in Boca Chica, Texas, with a suborbital testing campaign continuing from the previous year. Starship prototype SN15 was the first testbed of the future rocket family to survive a launch and soft touchdown on 5 May 2021. The first-ever full-stack fit check of Starship prototype SN20 with the booster stage followed in August.

== Orbital and suborbital launches ==
List of orbital launches
Month	Num. of successes	Num. of failures
January	7	0
February	9	1
March	10	0
April	11	0
May	9	1
June	13	1
July	11	0
August	9	3
September	10	1
October	10	1
November	16	0
December	20	3
Total	135	11

== Deep-space rendezvous ==
Date (UTC)	Spacecraft	Event	Remarks
17 January	Parker Solar Probe	7th perihelion	The spacecraft transmitted a “tone one,” indicating all systems were healthy and operating normally after the spacecraft's close approach to the Sun.
9 February	Emirates Mars Mission	Mars orbit insertion	Probe achieved an initial orbit around Mars of 1,000 x 49,380 km. It will spend several months modifying its orbit to 20,000 x 43,000 km.
10 February	Tianwen-1	Mars orbit insertion	Probe achieved an initial orbit around Mars of 400 x 180,000 km. Its initial reconnaissance orbit will be 265 x 60,000 km. In the reconnaissance orbit it released a deployable camera on 31 December 2021.
18 February	Perseverance	Mars landing	Rover successfully landed at target destination, with confirmation on Earth at 20:55 UTC. Landing was at Jezero crater, coordinates 18.4447°N 77.4508°E.
20 February	Parker Solar Probe	Fourth gravity assist at Venus	
21 February	Juno	32nd perijove of Jupiter	
7 April	OSIRIS-REx	Begin flyby of Bennu	
15 April	Juno	33rd perijove	
29 April	Parker Solar Probe	8th perihelion	
10 May	OSIRIS-REx	Completes Bennu flyby and begins journey back to Earth	
14 May	Zhurong	Mars landing	Rover successfully landed at Utopia Planitia, coordinates 25.1°N 109.9°E.
8 June	Juno	34th perijove	On the day of perijove, Juno flew by Ganymede, reducing its orbital period around Jupiter to 43 days.
21 July	Juno	35th perijove	Beginning of Juno's second mission extension.
8 August	Solar Orbiter	Second gravity assist at Venus	
9 August	Parker Solar Probe	9th perihelion	
11 August	BepiColombo	Second gravity assist at Venus	
2 September	Juno	36th perijove	
2 October	BepiColombo	First gravity assist at Mercury	
16 October	Juno	37th perijove	
16 October	Parker Solar Probe	Fifth gravity assist at Venus	
21 November	Parker Solar Probe	10th perihelion	
26 November	Solar Orbiter	Gravity assist at Earth	Gravity assist will set up future fly-bys of Venus that will increase its inclination relative to the Sun.

== Extravehicular activities (EVAs) ==
Start date/time	Duration	End time	Spacecraft	Crew	Remarks
27 January 11:28	6 hours 56 minutes	18:24	Expedition 64 ISS Quest	(United States) Michael S. Hopkins (United States) Victor Glover	Installation of the exposed platform Airbus Bartolomeo
1 February 12:57	5 hours 20 minutes	18:17	Expedition 64 ISS Quest	(United States) Michael S. Hopkins (United States) Victor Glover	Install a new lithium-ion battery on the P-4 truss, where an earlier lithium replacement blew a fuse in April 2019. Upgrade high definition video and camera gear on ISS exterior.
28 February 11:12	7 hours 04 minutes	18:16	Expedition 64 ISS Quest	(United States) Kathleen Rubins (United States) Victor Glover	Install modification kit to prepare Station for new solar array installation.
5 March 11:37	6 hours 56 minutes	18:33	Expedition 64 ISS Quest	(United States) Kathleen Rubins (Japan) Soichi Noguchi	Additional upgrades and Kibo module platform work
13 March 13:14	6 hours 47 minutes	20:01	Expedition 64 ISS Quest	(United States) Michael Hopkins (United States) Victor Glover	P6 fixes and installations
2 June 05:53	7 hours 19 minutes	13:12	Expedition 65 Poisk Airlock	(Russia) Oleg Novitsky (Russia) Pyotr Dubrov	Second in a series of spacewalks to decommission the Pirs Airlock which is scheduled to be replaced by Nauka in the summer of 2021. Task involve installing a flow control valve on Zarya, removing docking antennas and their cables on Pirs, removing EVA gap spanners from Pirs, transferring experiments over to Poisk, installing Test containers on the hatches, and relocating a Strela crane over to Poisk. Getahead task involve cleaning the windows on the Russian segment, and doing an inspection of Zvezda and plugging any leaks they find.
16 June 12:11	7 hours 15 minutes	19:26	Expedition 65 ISS Quest	(United States) Shane Kimbrough (France) Thomas Pesquet	First in a series of spacewalks to install the iROSA solar arrays on the P6 Truss. While working on releasing the arrays from their launch carrier, Kimbrough's spacesuit experienced issues with its Display and Control Module (DCM), so he was sent back to the airlock to connect to station umbilicals to restart it. The restart was successful, although it delayed the EVA. Additionally, an issue was discovered with his suit's sublimator, which threatened to end the EVA prematurely; this was determined to be a false reading, allowing work to resume. Following this, the astronauts successfully released the solar arrays and installed them on the P6 mounting bracket. A subsequent attempt to unfold the two rolled arrays, which were folded side by side during launch, failed due to interference (blockage) from a structure near the mounting area. As the EVA was then past the six-hour mark, ground controllers instructed the astronauts to finish securing the array structure to the station, photograph the work site, and return to the airlock. The next steps of unfolding the array pair, making electrical connections, and unfurling the rolled arrays were postponed to a future EVA pending ground analysis of the interference issue
20 June 11:42	6 hours 28 minutes	18:10	Expedition 65 ISS Quest	(United States) Shane Kimbrough (France) Thomas Pesquet	Second in a series of spacewalks that will install the iROSA solar arrays on the P6 Truss. The spacewalkers managed to connect iROSA with a little elbow grease and at 16:40 hours deployed it and it is receiving power.
25 June 11:52	6 hours 45 minutes	18:37	Expedition 65 ISS Quest	(United States) Shane Kimbrough (France) Thomas Pesquet	Third in a series of spacewalks that will install the ROSA solar arrays on the P6 Truss. If time allows the astronauts will also route cables to the Russian segment and install a WiFi router on the truss.
4 July 00:11	6 hours 46 minutes	06:57	Shenzhou 12 TSS Tianhe	(China) Liu Boming (China) Tang Hongbo	First Chinese spacewalk since Shenzhou 7 in 2008. Installation work was done on the exterior of the Tiangong space station.
20 August 00:38	5 hours 55 minutes	06:33	Shenzhou 12 TSS Tianhe	(China) Nie Haisheng (China) Liu Boming	Second EVA of Shenzhou 12 crew to install foot stops and a workbench on the station's large robotic arm, a pump set for its thermal control system, and additional work on the panoramic camera.
3 September 14:35	7 hours 54 minutes	22:35	Expedition 65 Poisk Airlock	(Russia) Oleg Novitsky (Russia) Pyotr Dubrov	First in a series of spacewalks to outfit Nauka. The cosmonauts will route cables which were recently temp stowed on PMA 1 along Zarya to the Zvezda transfer compartment where they will be mated to Nauka. The spacewalk will conclude with the installation of handrails and the first experiments on the new module. If time allows the cosmonauts will change Biorisk containers and will retrieve and replace two exposure experiments from Poisk and bring them inside.
9 September 15:00	7 hours 25 minutes	22:16	Expedition 65 Poisk Airlock	(Russia) Oleg Novitsky (Russia) Pyotr Dubrov	Second in a series of spacewalks to outfit Nauka. The cosmonauts continued where they left off from EVA 5, finishing Ethernet cable connections and installing four EVA handrails on Nauka (including the troublesome one left incomplete from EVA 5). They subsequently connected cable bundles between Nauka and Zvezda, providing Ethernet links between those modules as well as links for Nauka's TV cameras and docking navigation antennas (Kurs and TORU). They then mounted three Biorisk microorganism exposure experiment modules on the exterior of the Poisk airlock module. Additionally, the cosmonauts took survey photos of the exterior of the Russian segment of the station, including the Kurs docking antennas of the Progress MS-17 cargo vehicle (confirming that they were undamaged) and external sensors on Nauka; they also realigned a thruster plume measurement unit on Poisk. Finally, the cosmonauts tied together and jettisoned a junk cable reel cover along with some leftover insulation from the Biorisk experiments.
12 September 12:30	6 hours 54 minutes	19:09	Expedition 65 ISS Quest	(Japan) Akihiko Hoshide (France) Thomas Pesquet	Install the 3B modification kit on the P4 Truss for the arrival of SpaceX CRS-24 with the final portside IROSA solar arrays. Install a wifi router on the truss, and route and mate cables on the US side of PMA 1 to power up the Nauka module. Replace a Floating Point Measuring Unit and a Static Charge Micrometer external component on the S1 Truss to prepare the port side for it long term configuration.
7 November 10:51	6 hours 25 minutes	17:16	Shenzhou 13 TSS Tianhe	(China) Zhai Zhigang (China) Wang Yaping	They first installed foot stoppers and a working platform to the robotic arm before they set to work together to install a suspension device and transfer connectors to the robotic arm. Wang now becomes the first female Chinese astronaut to conduct extravehicular activities (EVA).
2 December 11:15	6 hours 32 minutes	17:45	Expedition 66 ISS Quest	(United States) Tom Marshburn (United States) Kayla Barron	Tom Marshburn and Kayla Barron conducted an EVA mainly to replace the Port 1 Truss S-Band Communications Antenna
26 December 10:44	6 hours 11 minutes	16:55	Shenzhou 13 TSS Tianhe	(China) Zhai Zhigang (China) Ye Guangfu	The astronauts deployed an external camera (panoramic camera C), installed a foot restraint platform, and tested various methods of translation (movement) of objects outside the station.

== Space debris events ==
Date/Time (UTC)	Source object	Event type	Pieces tracked	Remarks
18 March	(China) Yunhai-1 02	collision with a space junk	37	Accidental collision with a fragment from the Zenit-2 rocket body that launched Tselina-2 in 1996.
15 November	(Russia) Kosmos 1408	ASAT (Anti-Satellite) weapon system test	~1500	On 15 November 2021, at around 02:50 UTC, the satellite was destroyed as part of an anti-satellite weapons test by Russia, generating a space debris cloud that threatened the International Space Station. The seven crew members aboard the ISS (four American, two Russian, one German) were told to put on their spacesuits and take shelter in the crew capsules so they could quickly return to Earth if debris struck the station. The satellite had been in orbit at an altitude ~50 kilometers (~30 miles) above the ISS orbital altitude, with the debris intersecting the orbit of the ISS every 93 minutes.

== Orbital launch statistics ==
=== By country ===
For the purposes of this section, the yearly tally of orbital launches by country assigns each flight to the country of origin of the rocket, not to the launch services provider or the spaceport. For example, Soyuz launches by Arianespace in Kourou are counted under Russia because Soyuz-2 is a Russian rocket.

Country	Launches	Successes	Failures	Partial failures
China	56 (Note: Includes one unannounced orbital test flight)	53	3	0
France	3	3	0	0
India	2	1	1	0
Iran	2	0	2	0
Italy	3	3	1	0
Japan	3	3	0	0
Russia	25 (Note: Includes European Soyuz launches from Kourou, French Guiana by Arianespace)	24	0	1
South Korea	1	0	1	0
United States	51 (Note: Includes Electron launches from Māhia)	48	3	0
World	146	135	10	1

=== By rocket ===
- Ariane 5
- Atlas V
- Electron
- Falcon 9 new
- Falcon 9 reused
- Kuaizhou 1A
- Long March 2
- Long March 3
- Long March 4
- Long March 5
- Long March 6
- Long March 7
- Soyuz-2
- Soyuz-2-1v
- Soyuz-ST
- Vega
- Antares 230+
- H-IIA
- Hyperbola-1
- LauncherOne
- Proton-M
- Rocket 3
- Simorgh
- Others

==== By family ====
Family	Country	Launches	Successes	Failures	Partial failures	Remarks
Alpha	United States	1	0	1	0	Maiden flight
Angara	Russia	1	0	0	1	
Antares	United States	2	2	0	0	
Ariane	France	3	3	0	0	
Astra	United States	2	1	1	0	
Atlas	United States	4	4	0	0	
Ceres	China	1	1	0	0	
Delta	United States	1	1	0	0	
Electron	United States	6	5	1	0	
Epsilon	Japan	1	1	0	0	
Falcon	United States	31	31	0	0	
GSLV	India	1	0	1	0	
H-II	Japan	2	2	0	0	
Hyperbola	China	2	0	2	0	
Kuaizhou	China	4	3	1	0	
LauncherOne	United States	2	2	0	0	
Long March	China	49	49	0	0	
Minotaur	United States	1	1	0	0	
Nuri	South Korea	1	0	1	0	Maiden flight
Pegasus	United States	1	1	0	0	
PSLV	India	1	1	0	0	
R-7	Russia	22	22	0	0	
Simorgh	Iran	2	0	2	0	
Universal Rocket	Russia	2	2	0	0	
Vega	Italy	3	3	0	0	

==== By type ====
Rocket	Country	Family	Launches	Successes	Failures	Partial failures	Remarks
Alpha	United States	Alpha	1	0	1	0	Maiden flight
Angara A5	Russia	Angara	1	0	0	1	
Antares 200	United States	Antares	2	2	0	0	
Ariane 5	France	Ariane	3	3	0	0	
Atlas V	United States	Atlas	4	4	0	0	
Ceres-1	China	Ceres	1	1	0	0	
Delta IV	United States	Delta	1	1	0	0	
Electron	United States	Electron	6	5	1	0	
Epsilon	Japan	Epsilon	1	1	0	0	
Falcon 9	United States	Falcon	31	31	0	0	
GSLV	India	GSLV	1	0	1	0	
H-IIA	Japan	H-II	2	2	0	0	
Hyperbola-1	China	Hyperbola	2	0	2	0	
Kuaizhou	China	Kuaizhou	4	3	1	0	
LauncherOne	United States	LauncherOne	2	2	0	0	
Long March 2	China	Long March	14	14	0	0	
Long March 3	China	Long March	12	12	0	0	
Long March 4	China	Long March	14	14	0	0	
Long March 5	China	Long March	1	1	0	0	
Long March 6	China	Long March	4	4	0	0	
Long March 7	China	Long March	4	4	0	0	
Minotaur I	United States	Minotaur	1	1	0	0	
Nuri	South Korea	Nuri	1	0	1	0	Maiden flight
Pegasus	United States	Pegasus	1	1	0	0	
PSLV	India	PSLV	1	1	0	0	
Proton	Russia	Universal Rocket	2	2	0	0	
Rocket 3	United States	Astra	2	1	1	0	
Simorgh	Iran	Simorgh	2	0	2	0	
Soyuz-2	Russia	R-7	22	22	0	0	
Vega	Italy	Vega	3	3	0	0	

==== By configuration ====
Rocket	Country	Type	Launches	Successes	Failures	Partial failures	Remarks
Alpha	United States	Alpha	1	0	1	0	Maiden flight
Angara A5 / Persei	Russia	Angara A5	1	0	0	1	Maiden flight
Antares 230+	United States	Antares 200	2	2	0	0	
Ariane 5 ECA	France	Ariane 5	3	3	0	0	
Atlas V 401	United States	Atlas V	2	2	0	0	
Atlas V 421	United States	Atlas V	1	1	0	0	
Atlas V 551	United States	Atlas V	1	1	0	0	
Ceres-1	China	Ceres-1	1	1	0	0	
Delta IV Heavy	United States	Delta IV	1	1	0	0	
Electron	United States	Electron	6	5	1	0	
Epsilon	Japan	Epsilon	1	1	0	0	
Falcon 9 Block 5	United States	Falcon 9	31	31	0	0	
GSLV Mk II	India	GSLV	1	0	1	0	
H-IIA 202	Japan	H-IIA	1	1	0	0	
H-IIA 204	Japan	H-IIA	1	1	0	0	Final flight
Hyperbola-1	China	Hyperbola-1	2	0	2	0	
Kuaizhou 1A	China	Kuaizhou	4	3	1	0	
LauncherOne	United States	LauncherOne	2	2	0	0	
Long March 2C	China	Long March 2	6	6	0	0	
Long March 2D	China	Long March 2	6	6	0	0	
Long March 2F/G	China	Long March 2	2	2	0	0	
Long March 3B/E	China	Long March 3	11	11	0	0	
Long March 3C/E	China	Long March 3	1	1	0	0	
Long March 4B	China	Long March 4	5	5	0	0	
Long March 4C	China	Long March 4	9	9	0	0	
Long March 5B	China	Long March 5	1	1	0	0	
Long March 6	China	Long March 6	4	4	0	0	
Long March 7	China	Long March 7	2	2	0	0	
Long March 7A	China	Long March 7	2	2	0	0	
Minotaur I	United States	Minotaur I	1	1	0	0	
Nuri	South Korea	Nuri	1	0	1	0	Maiden flight
Pegasus-XL	United States	Pegasus	1	1	0	0	
Proton-M	Russia	Proton	1	1	0	0	
Proton-M / Briz-M	Russia	Proton	1	1	0	0	
PSLV-DL	India	PSLV	1	1	0	0	
Rocket 3	United States	Rocket 3	2	1	1	0	
Simorgh	Iran	Simorgh	2	0	2	0	
Soyuz-2.1a	Russia	Soyuz-2	6	6	0	0	
Soyuz-2.1a / Fregat-M or ST-A	Russia	Soyuz-2	1	1	0	0	
Soyuz-2.1b	Russia	Soyuz-2	3	3	0	0	
Soyuz-2.1b / Fregat-M or ST-B	Russia	Soyuz-2	11	11	0	0	
Soyuz-2-1v / Volga	Russia	Soyuz-2	1	1	0	0	
Vega	Italy	Vega	3	3	0	0	

=== By spaceport ===
- Jiuquan
- Taiyuan
- Wenchang
- Xichang
- Kourou
- Satish Dhawan
- Semnan
- Tanegashima
- Uchinoura
- Baikonur
- Mahia
- Plesetsk
- Vostochny
- Naro
- Cape Canaveral
- Kennedy
- MARS
- Mojave
- PSCA
- Vandenberg

Site	Country	Launches	Successes	Failures	Partial failures	Remarks
Baikonur	Kazakhstan	14	14	0	0	
Cape Canaveral	United States	19	19	0	0	
Jiuquan	China	22	19	3	0	
Kennedy	United States	12	12	0	0	
Kourou	France	7	7	0	0	
Mahia	New Zealand	6	5	1	0	
MARS	United States	3	3	0	0	
Mojave	United States	2	2	0	0	
Naro	South Korea	1	0	1	0	
PSCA	United States	2	1	1	0	
Plesetsk	Russia	5	4	0	1	
Satish Dhawan	India	2	1	1	0	
Semnan	Iran	2	0	2	0	
Taiyuan	China	12	12	0	0	
Tanegashima	Japan	2	2	0	0	
Uchinoura	Japan	1	1	0	0	
Vandenberg	United States	7	6	1	0	
Vostochny	Russia	5	5	0	0	
Wenchang	China	5	5	0	0	
Xichang	China	16	16	0	0	
Total		146	135	10	1	

=== By orbit ===
- Transatmospheric
- Low Earth
- Low Earth (ISS)
- Low Earth (CSS)
- Low Earth (SSO)
- Low Earth (polar)
- Medium Earth
- Molniya
- Geosynchronous
- Inclined GSO
- High Earth
- Heliocentric

Orbital regime	Launches	Achieved	Not achieved	Accidentally achieved	Remarks
Transatmospheric	1	1	0	0	
Low Earth / Sun-synchronous	112	103	9	0	Including flights to ISS and Tiangong
Geosynchronous / GTO	26	25	0	1	
Medium Earth / Molniya	3	3	0	0	
High Earth / Lunar transfer	1	0	0	1	
Heliocentric orbit / Planetary transfer	3	3	0	0	
Total	146	135	9	2	

== Suborbital launch statistics ==
=== By country ===
For the purposes of this section, the yearly tally of suborbital launches by country assigns each flight to the country of origin of the rocket, not to the launch services provider or the spaceport. Flights intended to fly below 80 km (50 mi) are omitted.

Country	Launches	Successes	Failures	Partial failures
Brazil	2	2	0	0
Canada	9	9	0	0
China	15	15	0	0
France	1	1	0	0
India	6	6	0	0
Iran	36	36	0	0
Japan	4	4	0	0
Netherlands	1	0	1	0
Pakistan	5	5	0	0
Russia	6	6	0	0
South Korea	3 (Note: Unknown outcome of the first Blue Whale 0.1 launch.)	1	1	1
Taiwan	2 (Note: Includes Hapith I VS01 which was precluded prior to launch.)	1	0	1
Turkey	1	1	0	0
United States	49	47	2	0
Ukraine	2	2	0	0
Yemen	5	5	0	0
World	147	141	4	2

== See also ==
- Timeline of Solar System exploration#2020s
