= Numerica Corporation =

- Numerica Corporation (the United States) Numerica Corporation (Colorado)
- Founded: 1996
- Purpose: space data provider
- Headquarters: Fort Collins, Colorado, US
- Coordinates: 40°31′04″N 105°00′53″W
- Website: http://www.numerica.us/

Numerica Corporation is an air and missile defense company.

== History ==
Numerica was founded by Aubrey B. Poore, an applied mathematics professor at Colorado State University, in 1996. It is based in Fort Collins, Colorado, with a second office in Colorado Springs, and a third also in Fort Collins. It has around 70 employees.

In 2022, the Space Division of Numerica was acquired by Slingshot Aerospace.

In 2025, the Radar and Command and Control businesses of Numerica were acquired by Anduril Industries.

== Facilities ==
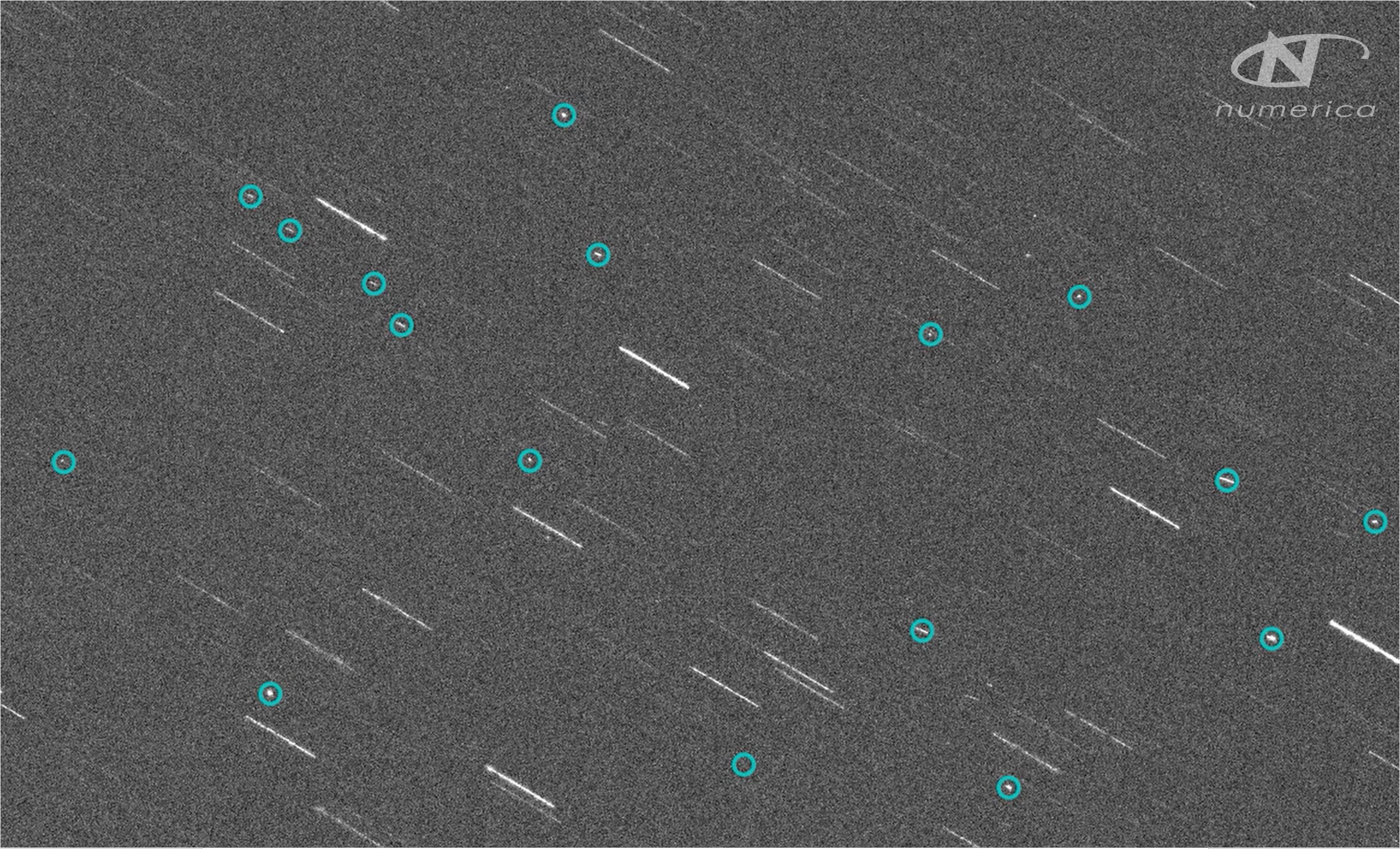
The debris cloud from Kosmos 1408 imaged by Numerica

Numerica has a worldwide network of around 20 ground-based optical telescopes to track satellites, with around 130 optical sensors. These include telescopes with apertures of 11 inches (28 cm), 14 inches (36 cm) and 20 inches (51 cm), which operate both at night and during daylight. Originally targeted at geostationary satellites, they were upgraded in 2021 so that they could be used to track low Earth orbit satellites. The use of optical telescopes is aimed at complementing existing radar tracking facilities to provide surveillance and tracking data. It has been contracted by the UK Space Agency to provide information about UK-licensed satellites in orbit, and is also contracted by the United States Air Force.

In November 2021 it imaged the debris cloud from the destruction of Kosmos 1408 by a Russian anti-satellite missile.

It also sells short-range radar systems, including to the United States Army.
