= Atmospheric dynamo =

The Atmospheric dynamo is a pattern of electrical currents that are set up in the Earth's ionosphere by multiple effects, mostly the Sun's solar wind, but also the tides of the Moon and Sun. The currents flow in circuits between the poles and the equator, but they are not well understood.

== See also ==
- Dynamo
- Solar dynamo
