= Perigee Aerospace =

South Korean aerospace manufacturer

- Company type: Private
- Founded: 2018; 7 years ago
- Headquarters: Daejeon, South Korea
- Key people: Yoon Shin, CEO
- Number of employees: 30
- Website: perigee.space

Perigee Aerospace is a private developer and manufacturer of orbital and sub-orbital launch vehicles located in Daejeon, South Korea. The company was formally established in 2018, but work began in 2012, initially with the launch of sounding rockets.

As of 2019, Perigee Aerospace employed 30 people. It develops the small orbital rocket Blue Whale 1. As of 2019, the company also planned to develop a larger rocket.

== Vehicles ==
=== Blue Whale 1 ===
Blue Whale 1
- Function: Small-lift Orbital launch vehicle
- Manufacturer: Perigee Aerospace
- Country of origin: South Korea
- Cost per launch: US$3 million

Size
- Height: 21 m (69 ft)
- Diameter: 1,600 mm (63 in)
- Mass: 2,200 kg (4,900 lb)
- Stages: 2

Capacity

Payload to 500km SSO
- Mass: 170 kg (370 lb)

Payload to 500km LEO
- Mass: 150 kg (330 lb)

Launch history
- Status: In Development
- Launch sites: Jeju Space Center
- Total launches: No launches yet
- First flight: 2024

First stage
- Engines: 9x Blue 1S
- Thrust: 306 KN (vacuum)
- Specific impulse: 327 s (vacuum)
- Burn time: 210 s
- Propellant: LOX/methane

Second stage
- Engines: 1x Skyblue
- Thrust: 4.3 KN (vacuum)
- Specific impulse: 355 s (vacuum)
- Burn time: 400 s
- Propellant: LOX/methane

The two-stage Blue Whale 1 is a partially reusable orbital rocket in development. Launching from a sea launch pad in Jeju space center in South Korea, it can deliver up to 170 kg to a Sun-synchronous orbit with an altitude of 500 km. The maiden flight was planned for July 2020 but has been delayed several times. Perigee Aerospace hopes to build the capacity to launch up to 40 Blue Whale 1 rockets per year at a price of less than US$3 million. The orbital maiden flight of Blue Whale 1 was expected to take place in late 2024, preceded by a suborbital test flight scheduled for May 2024. The suborbital launch is now planned for 2025.

=== Sounding Rockets ===
Started in 2012, Perigee Aerospace began by developing and launching numerous sounding rockets for meteorological research for the Korean government. In 2018 and 2019 the company received two rounds of venture capital backing from some of South Korea's leading technology investors including Samsung Venture Investments and LB Investment (a subsidiary of LG) to support the development of Blue Whale.The company is also supported by KAIST, South Korea's top technical research institution.

According to an interview posted on the website of Expedition College in March 2020, an educational program by Dong-A Science, Perigee Aerospace was planning to launch a suborbital sounding rocket developed in collaboration with KAIST. This sounding rocket, designated Blue Whale 0.1, was launched on 29 December 2021 in order to validate the engines of the Blue Whale 1 rocket. The flight was terminated shortly after takeoff due to unexpectedly strong winds.

Third flight of Blue Whale 0.1 took place on 24 March 2022 from Jeju Island. It was suborbital flight test and it was successful.

== See also ==
- Rocket Lab – New Zealand and American public spaceflight company
- Firefly Aerospace – American aerospace company
- Virgin Orbit – Defunct American aerospace company
