= Kosmos 1408 =

Soviet artificial satellite destroyed by an ASAT missile

Kosmos-1408
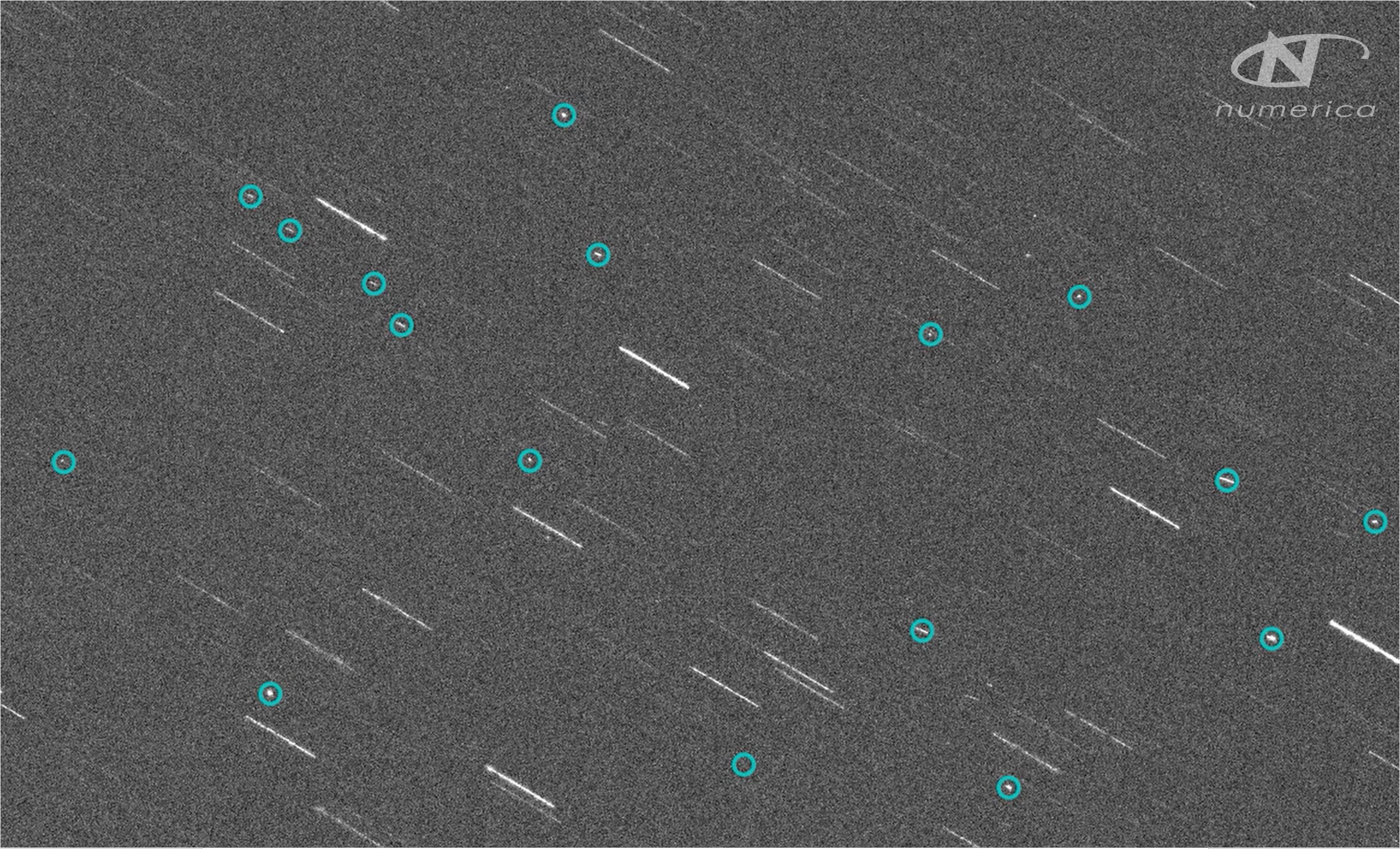
- Ground-based telescope image of Kosmos 1408 debris (circled objects), captured on 15 November 2021
- Names: Космос-1408; Ikar No. 39L
- Mission type: ELINT
- COSPAR ID: 1982-092A
- SATCAT no.: 13552
- Mission duration: 6 months (planned); 2 years (achieved)

Spacecraft properties
- Spacecraft: Ikar No. 39L
- Spacecraft type: ELINT
- Bus: Tselina-D
- Manufacturer: Yuzhnoye Design Office
- Launch mass: 1,750 kg (3,860 lb)

Start of mission
- Launch date: 16 September 1982, 04:55 UTC
- Rocket: Tsyklon-3
- Launch site: Plesetsk Cosmodrome, Site 32/2
- Contractor: Yuzhmash

End of mission
- Declared: 1984
- Destroyed: 15 November 2021

Orbital parameters
- Reference system: Geocentric orbit
- Regime: Low Earth orbit
- Perigee altitude: 465 km (289 mi)
- Apogee altitude: 490 km (300 mi)
- Inclination: 82.60°
- Period: 93.00 minutes

Kosmos-1408 (Russian: Космос-1408) was an electronic signals intelligence (ELINT) satellite operated by the Soviet Union. It was launched into low Earth orbit on 16 September 1982 at 14:55 UTC, replacing Kosmos-1378. It operated for around two years before becoming inactive and left in orbit.

The satellite was destroyed in a Russian anti-satellite weapon test on 15 November 2021, resulting in space debris in orbits between 300 and 1,100 km (190 and 680 mi) above Earth. The threat of potential collision with debris caused the crew of the International Space Station (ISS) to take shelter in their escape capsules for the first few passes of the debris cloud, and increased the future risk of a debris collision with the ISS or other satellites for years.

== Mission ==
From 1965 to 1967, the Soviet Yuzhnoye Design Office developed two satellite ELINT systems: Tselina-O for broad observations and Tselina-D for detailed observations. The ELINT payloads (satellites) for Tselina were first tested under the Kosmos designation in 1962–65. The Soviet Ministry of Defence could not convince the different parts of the Soviet military to decide between the two, so both systems were brought into service. The first production Tselina-O was launched in 1970. The Tselina-D took longer to enter service, due to delays with the satellite development and problems with the mass budget. The full Tselina system became operational in 1976. Continued improvements in the satellite systems led to Tselina-O being abandoned in 1984, with all of the capabilities of the two satellite systems being combined into Tselina-D.

== Spacecraft ==
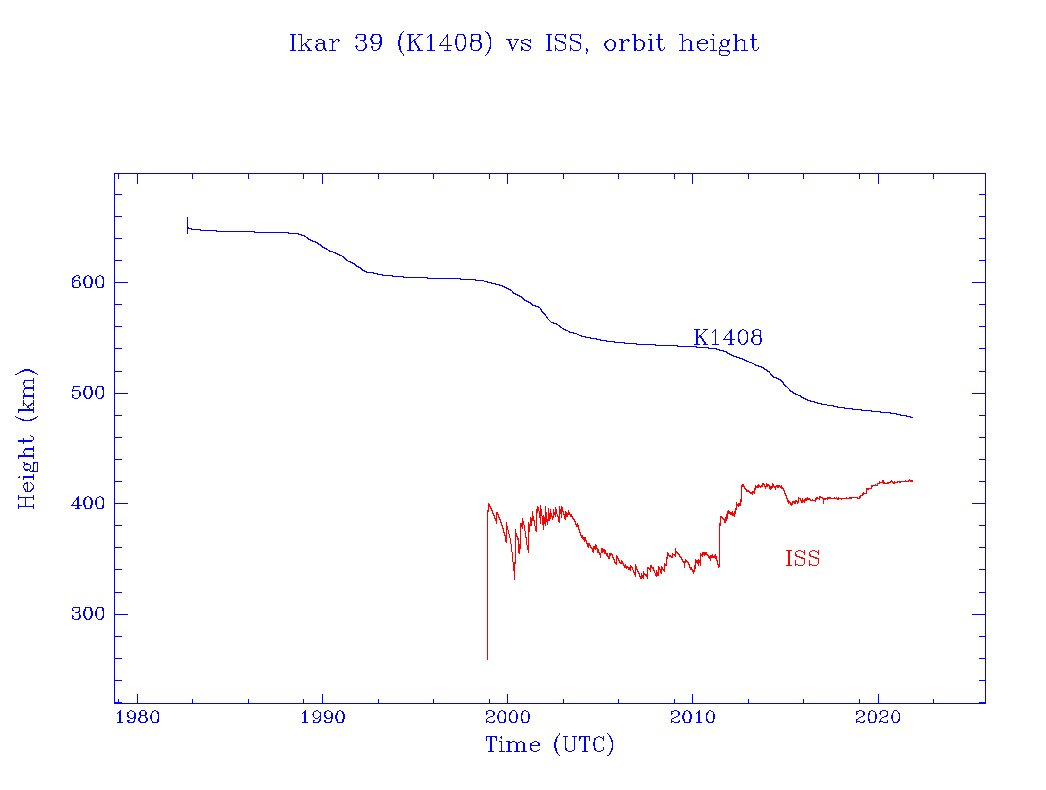
The orbital decay of Kosmos-1408 since 1980, compared with the ISS

Kosmos-1408 was part of the Tselina-D system. It had a mass of around 1,750 kg (3,860 lb), and a radius of around 2.5 m (8 ft 2 in). It is thought to have replaced Kosmos-1378 in the Tselina system, since it was launched into a similar orbital plane.

Kosmos-1408 was launched on a Tsyklon-3 launch vehicle on 16 September 1982, from Site 32/2, at the Plesetsk Cosmodrome. It was placed in low Earth orbit, with a perigee of 645 km (401 mi), an apogee of 679 km (422 mi), and an inclination of 82.5°. Its orbital period was 97.8 minutes.

The satellite had an expected lifespan of around six months, but it operated for around two years. The satellite could not be de-orbited after finishing operations because it did not have a propulsion system. Its orbit subsequently slowly decayed due to the small natural drag of the thermosphere.

== Destruction ==
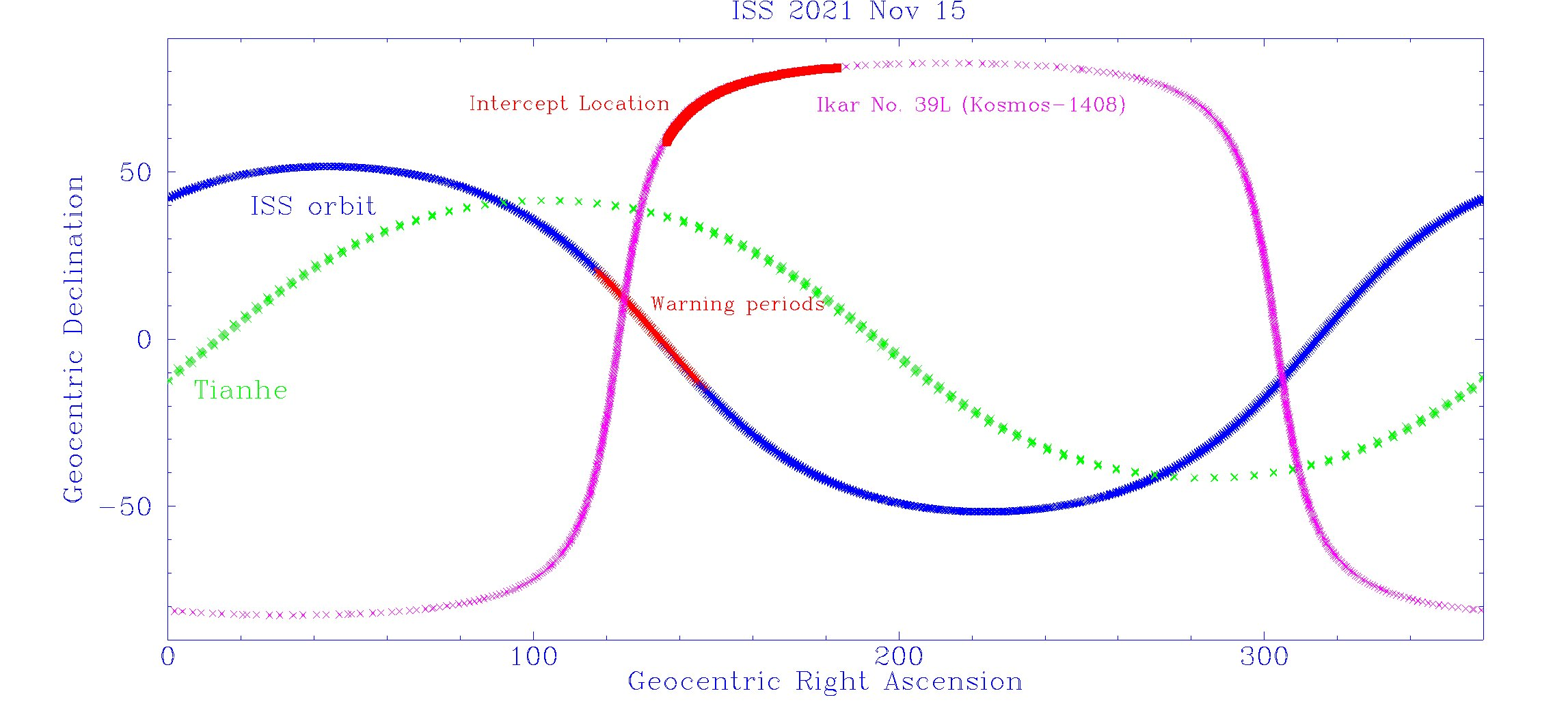
Warning periods when the ISS and Kosmos-1408 orbits crossed

On 15 November 2021, at around 02:50 UTC, the satellite was destroyed as part of an anti-satellite weapons test by Russia. The direct-ascent anti-satellite A-235 "Nudol" anti-ballistic missile was launched from Plesetsk Cosmodrome at around 02:45 UTC. The system had been undergoing testing since 2014, but this was the first satellite it destroyed. The Outer Space Treaty, which Russia has ratified, bans some types of military activities in space, but not anti-satellite missiles using conventional warheads.

The destruction of the satellite and missile produced a cloud of space debris that threatened the International Space Station. The seven crew members aboard the ISS (four American, two Russian, one German) for Expedition 66 were told to put on their intravehicular activity spacesuits and take shelter in the crewed spacecraft (Soyuz MS-19 and SpaceX Crew-3) so they could quickly return to Earth if debris struck the station. The satellite had been in orbit at an altitude ~50 kilometers (~30 miles) above the ISS orbital altitude, with the debris intersecting the orbit of the ISS every 93 minutes.

The crew sheltered for only the second and third passes through the debris field, based on an assessment of the debris risk. There is no evidence that any debris hit the station, but the risk of a potential impact was thought to be increased by a factor of five for the following weeks and months, and the longer term risk was doubled. In June 2022 the ISS had to maneuver to avoid a piece of debris from the satellite. The debris can also pose a risk to other low Earth orbit satellites, and several SpaceX Starlink satellites underwent maneuvers to reduce the risk of collision with the debris. On 18 January 2022 there was a near miss (separated by only 14.5 metres (48 ft)) between a piece of debris and the Tsinghua Science Satellite.

On 15 November, the US State Department reported that it had identified about 1,500 pieces of debris that can be tracked by ground-based radar, and hundreds of thousands more that are more difficult to track. The same day, breakup of the satellite was independently confirmed by Numerica Corporation and Slingshot Aerospace. By 16 November 2021, the debris was orbiting at altitudes between 440 and 520 km (270 and 320 mi); by 17 November 2021 this range increased to 300 to 1,100 km (190 to 680 mi).

On 18 November 2021, LeoLabs, a commercial tracking company, detected around 300 pieces and also estimated that there were around 1,500 ground-trackable pieces in total. They found this lower than expected, compared to other anti-satellite tests, meaning that the pieces are expected to have higher masses so will stay in orbit for longer, and that the lower-than-expected number of debris pieces might be because the event was not a hypervelocity collision. By 21 December, LeoLabs was tracking around 500 pieces of debris, including several large items that are thought to be the solar panels, antennas and booms from the satellite.

The low altitude of the satellite means the debris swarm is expected to be short-lived. As of February 2023 only 300 of the initial 1,790 pieces of debris (17%) were still in orbit. Increasing solar activity during solar cycle 25 is causing the debris to decay at a faster rate than usual.

As of November 2025 only 5 pieces of debris (0.3%) remain in orbit from Kosmos 1408, per CelesTrak’s latest catalog.

=== Reactions ===
The US State Department accused Russia of having targeted Kosmos 1408 during an anti-satellite weapon test, using a ground-based missile against their own defunct satellite, saying that it was "dangerous and irresponsible". On 15 November the Russian foreign minister, Sergei Lavrov, stated that there was no risk to the ISS or other peaceful uses of space. On 16 November, Sergei Shoigu, the Russian minister of defence, acknowledged that the destruction of the satellite was due to a Russian missile test, but argued that it posed no threat to any space activities.

NASA administrator Bill Nelson stated that: "With its long and storied history in human spaceflight, it is unthinkable that Russia would endanger not only the American and international partner astronauts on the ISS, but also their own cosmonauts." He added, "Their actions are reckless and dangerous, threatening as well [sic] the Chinese space station and the taikonauts on board."

Three Chinese astronauts of Shenzhou 13 were aboard Chinese space station then. Spokesperson of the Ministry of Foreign Affairs of China said it's too early to make any comments on this incident, answering during the press conference on November 16th.

The Secure World Foundation, a U.S. think tank, called upon the United States, Russia, China, and India to declare unilateral moratoriums on further testing of their anti-satellite weapons.

== See also ==
- 1985 ASM-135 ASAT test – United States first anti-satellite missile test
- 2007 Chinese anti-satellite missile test
- Gravity – 2013 science fiction movie in which a Russian satellite shoot-down creates a catastrophic Kessler syndrome–inciting debris swarm
- Kessler syndrome – hypothetical runaway debris cascade making low Earth orbit inaccessible for centuries
- Mission Shakti – 2019 Indian anti-satellite missile test
- Operation Burnt Frost – 2008 United States satellite intercept
