= Stephanie Wilson =

American astronaut and engineer (born 1966)

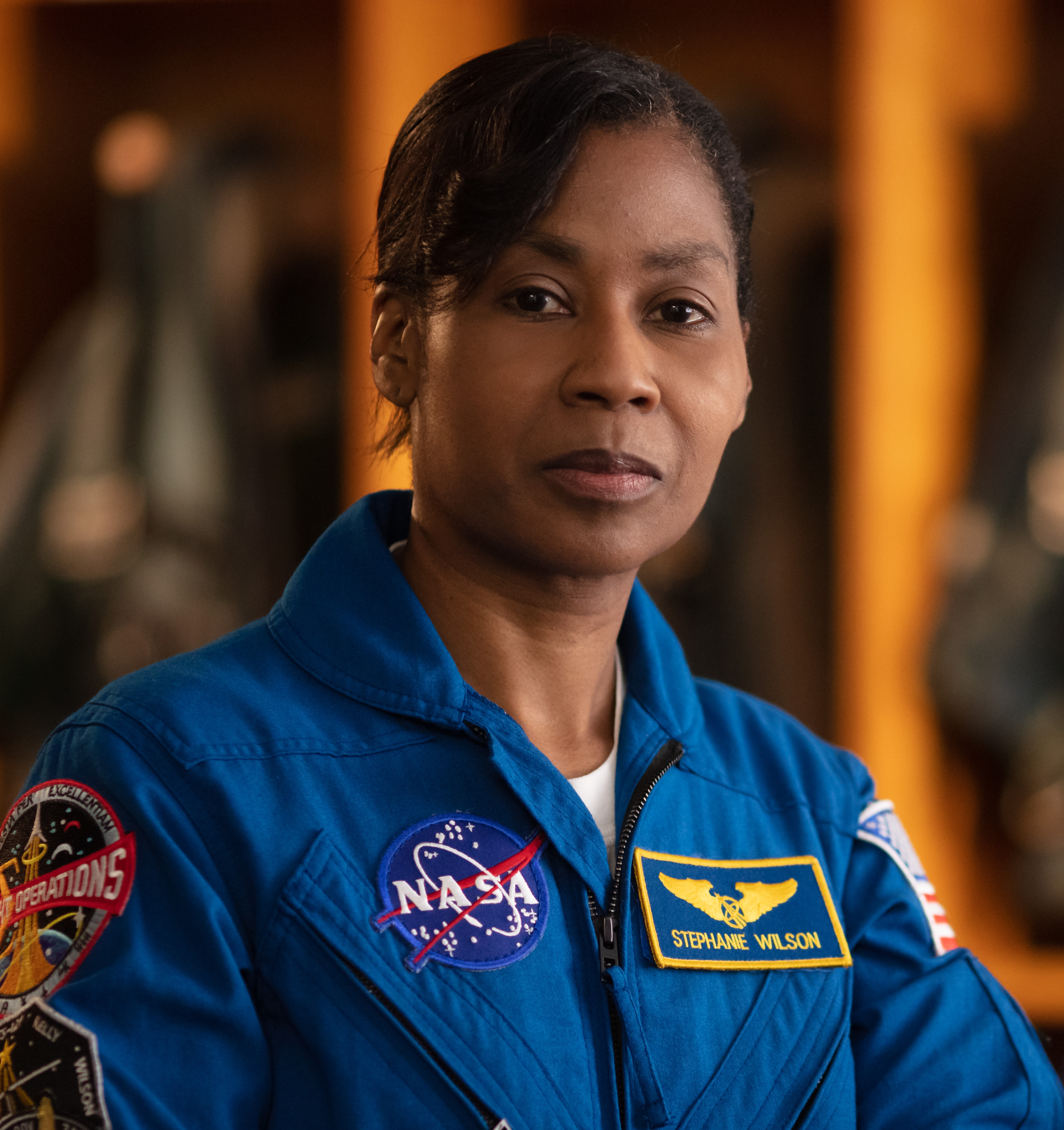
- Wilson in 2019
- Born: Stephanie Diana Wilson; September 27, 1966 (age 60); Boston, Massachusetts, U.S.
- Education: Harvard University (BS); University of Texas, Austin (MS)
- Space career

NASA astronaut
- Time in space: 42d 23h 46m
- Selection: NASA Group 16 (1996)
- Missions: STS-121; STS-120; STS-131

Stephanie Diana Wilson (born September 27, 1966) is an American engineer and a NASA astronaut. She flew to space onboard three Space Shuttle missions and is the second African American woman to go into space after Mae Jemison. As of 2026, her almost 43 days in space are the second most of any female African American astronaut, having been surpassed by Jessica Watkins in 2022.

== Early life and education ==
Wilson was born in Boston, Massachusetts on September 27, 1966. About a year later, her parents, Eugene and Barbara Wilson, decided to move to Pittsfield, Massachusetts. Eugene, a native of Nesmith, South Carolina, used his electronics training from his time in the Navy to get himself a degree from Northeastern University and a long career in electrical engineering for Raytheon, Sprague Electric, and Lockheed Martin, while Barbara, from Talbot County, Georgia, worked as a production assistant for Lockheed Martin.

After attending Stearns Elementary School, she attended Crosby Junior High School. For a career awareness class in middle school, Wilson was assigned to interview someone in a field that interested her. Since she liked to look up at the sky, she interviewed Williams College astronomer Jay Pasachoff, clarifying her potential career interest in space. In high school, Eugene encouraged Stephanie to go into engineering, so she decided to become an aerospace engineer.

Wilson graduated from Taconic High School, Pittsfield, Massachusetts, in 1984. She attended Harvard University, receiving a Bachelor of Science degree in engineering science in 1988. Wilson earned a Master of Science degree in aerospace engineering from the University of Texas in 1992. Wilson has returned to Harvard as a member of the Harvard Board of Overseers. She was the Chief Marshal for the 362nd Harvard Commencement on May 30, 2013.

== Career ==
=== Engineering ===
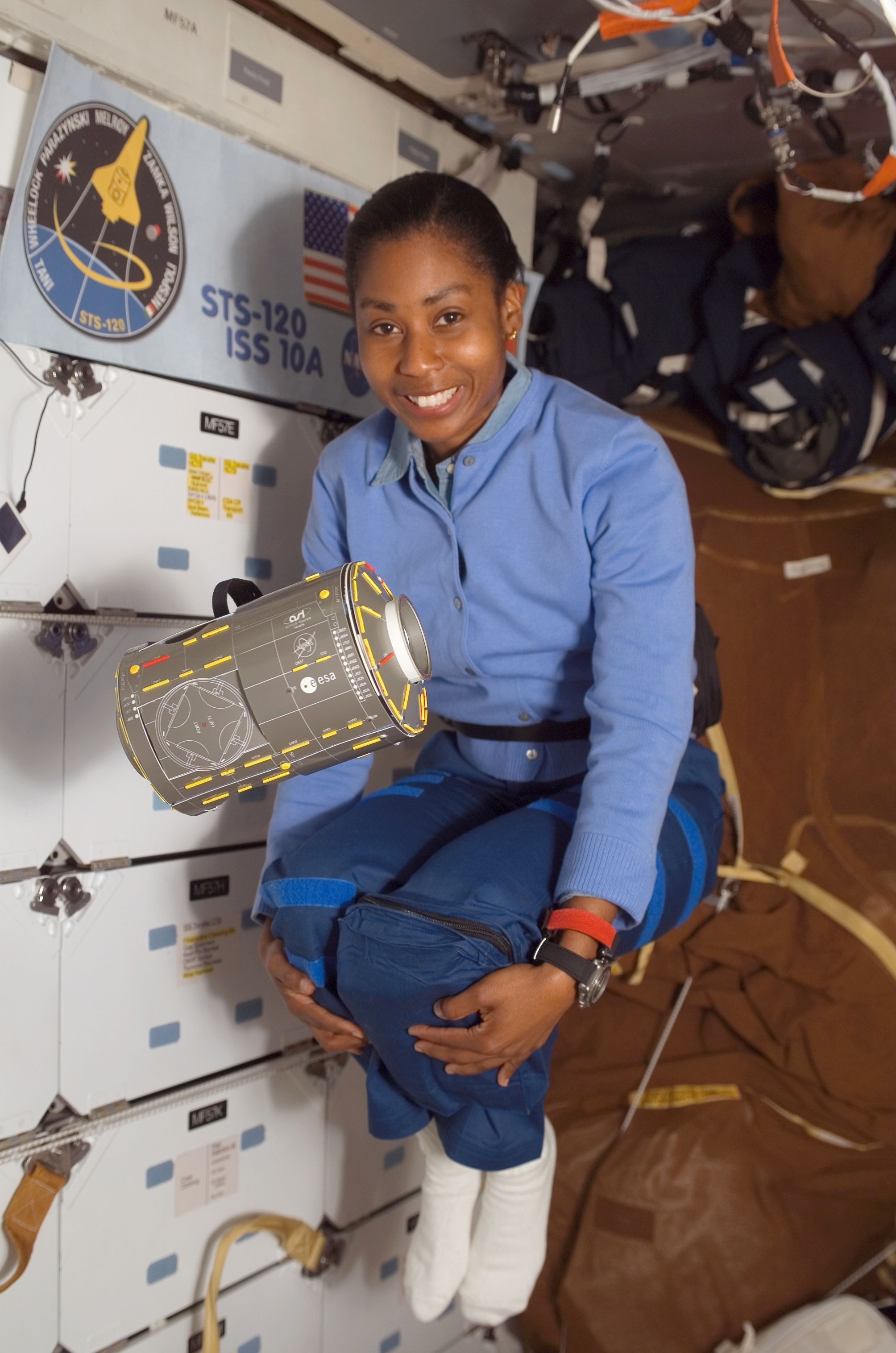
Wilson during STS-120, with a model of Node 2 floating in front of her

Wilson worked for two years for the former Martin Marietta Astronautics Group in Denver, Colorado. As a Loads and Dynamics engineer for the Titan IV rocket, Wilson was responsible for performing coupled loads analyses for the launch vehicle and payloads during flight events. Wilson left Martin Marietta in 1990 to attend graduate school at the University of Texas. Her research focused on the control and modeling of large, flexible space structures.

Following the completion of her graduate work, Wilson began working for the Jet Propulsion Laboratory in Pasadena, California, in 1992. As a member of the Attitude and Articulation Control Subsystem for the Galileo spacecraft, Wilson was responsible for assessing attitude controller performance, science platform pointing accuracy, antenna pointing accuracy, and spin rate accuracy. She worked in the areas of sequence development and testing as well. While at the Jet Propulsion Laboratory, Wilson also supported the Interferometery Technology Program as a member of the Integrated Modeling Team, which was responsible for finite element modeling, controller design, and software development.

== NASA ==
Selected by NASA as an astronaut candidate in April 1996, Wilson reported to the Johnson Space Center in August 1996. Having completed two years of training and evaluation, she is qualified for flight assignment as a mission specialist. She was initially assigned technical duties in the Astronaut Office Space Station Operations Branch to work with Space Station payload displays and procedures. She then served in the Astronaut Office CAPCOM Branch, working in Mission Control as a prime communicator with on-orbit crews. Following her work in Mission Control, Wilson was assigned technical duties in the Astronaut Office Shuttle Operations Branch involving the Space Shuttle Main Engines, External Tank and Solid Rocket Boosters.

Wilson has flown on three shuttle missions. On STS-121, Wilson flew aboard as a mission specialist. She also flew on the STS-120 mission that delivered the Harmony connecting module to the International Space Station. In April 2010, Wilson flew as a mission specialist on STS-131.

On October 18, 2019, Wilson was ground controller at Houston for the first all woman spacewalk by Christina Koch and Jessica Meir.

On December 9, 2020, NASA announced that Stephanie Wilson was among the candidates for the Artemis program, and if selected, she could be both the first woman and the first African-American on the Moon.

On January 31, 2024, NASA announced that Wilson would fly as mission specialist on the SpaceX Crew-9 mission to the International Space Station. However, when NASA decided to return the Boeing Starliner capsule on the Boeing Crew Flight Test uncrewed, Wilson was removed from Crew-9, along with commander and fellow astronaut Zena Cardman, to make room on the return journey for the Starliner astronauts, Barry E. Wilmore and Sunita Williams. On September 28, 2024, she made a brief appearance during NASA's coverage of the Crew-9 launch, which was co-hosted by Cardman and NASA communicator Derrol Nail. Cardman had commented during the nearly five-hour broadcast at length on the experience that Nick Hague and Roscosmos cosmonaut Aleksandr Gorbunov were going through as they successfully launched from Cape Canaveral Space Force Station in Florida.

=== Spaceflight experience ===
==== STS-121 ====
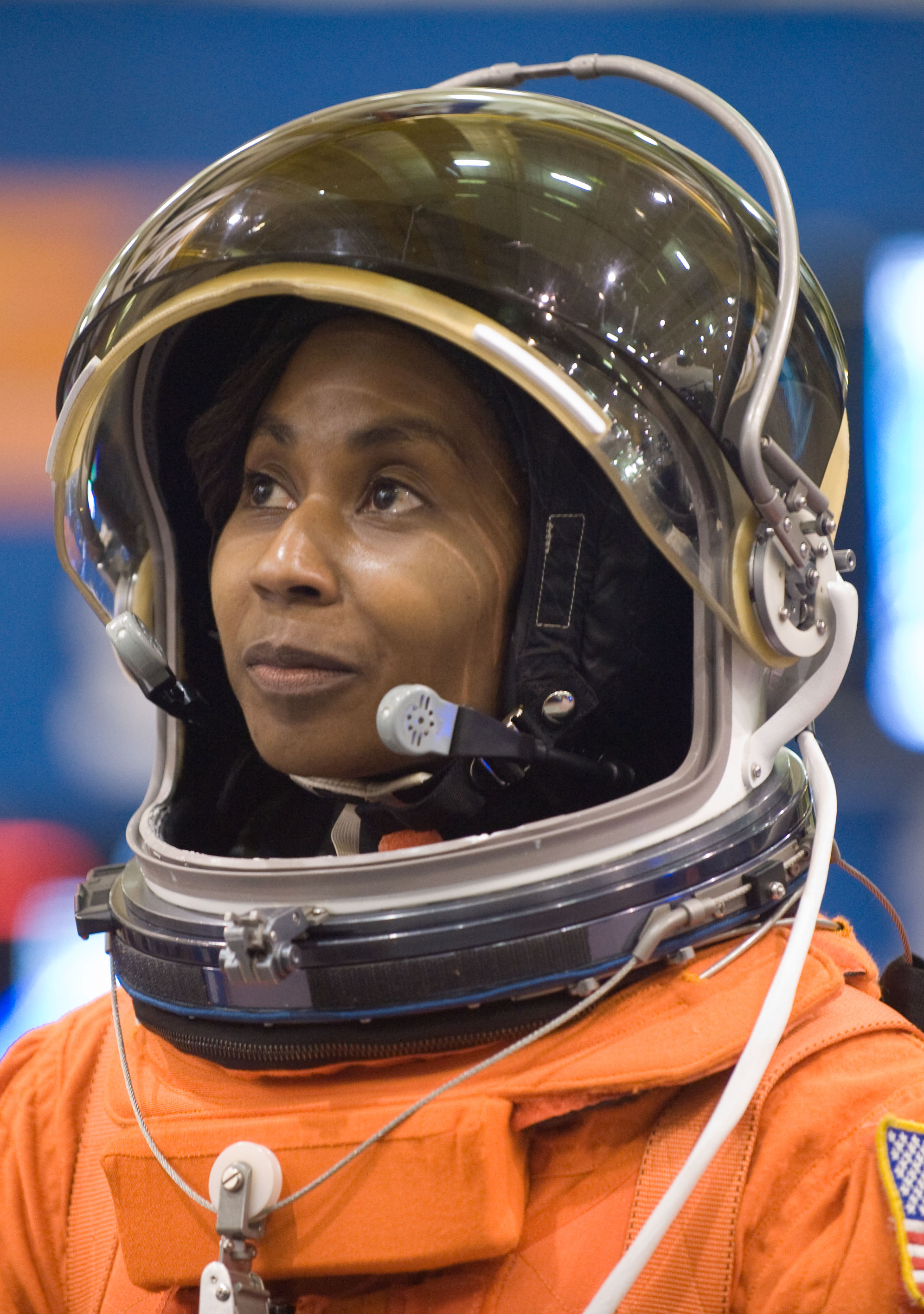
Wilson participates in a training session in the Space Vehicle Mock-up Facility at NASA's Johnson Space Center

STS-121 (July 4–17, 2006), was a return-to-flight test mission and assembly flight to the International Space Station. During the 13-day flight, the crew of Space Shuttle Discovery tested new equipment and procedures that increase the safety of space shuttles, repaired a rail car on the International Space Station and produced never-before-seen, high-resolution images of the Shuttle during and after its July 4 launch. Wilson supported robotic arm operations for vehicle inspection, Multi-Purpose Logistics Module installation and EVAs and was responsible for transferring more than 28,000 pounds of supplies and equipment to the ISS. The crew also performed maintenance on the space station and delivered a new Expedition 13 crew member to the station. The mission was accomplished in 306 hours, 37 minutes, and 54 seconds.

==== STS-120 ====
STS-120 (October 23 – November 7, 2007) was a 6.25 million mile Space Shuttle mission to the International Space Station. It delivered the Harmony module, and reconfigured the P6 truss in preparation for future assembly missions. STS-120 carried a new Expedition 16 crew member, Daniel Tani, and returned Expedition 15 and Expedition 16 crewmember Clayton Anderson. The crew conducted four spacewalks and performed a previously untested repair method on the station's solar array. The mission was accomplished in 15 days, 2 hours, 23 minutes, during 238 orbits.

==== STS-131 ====
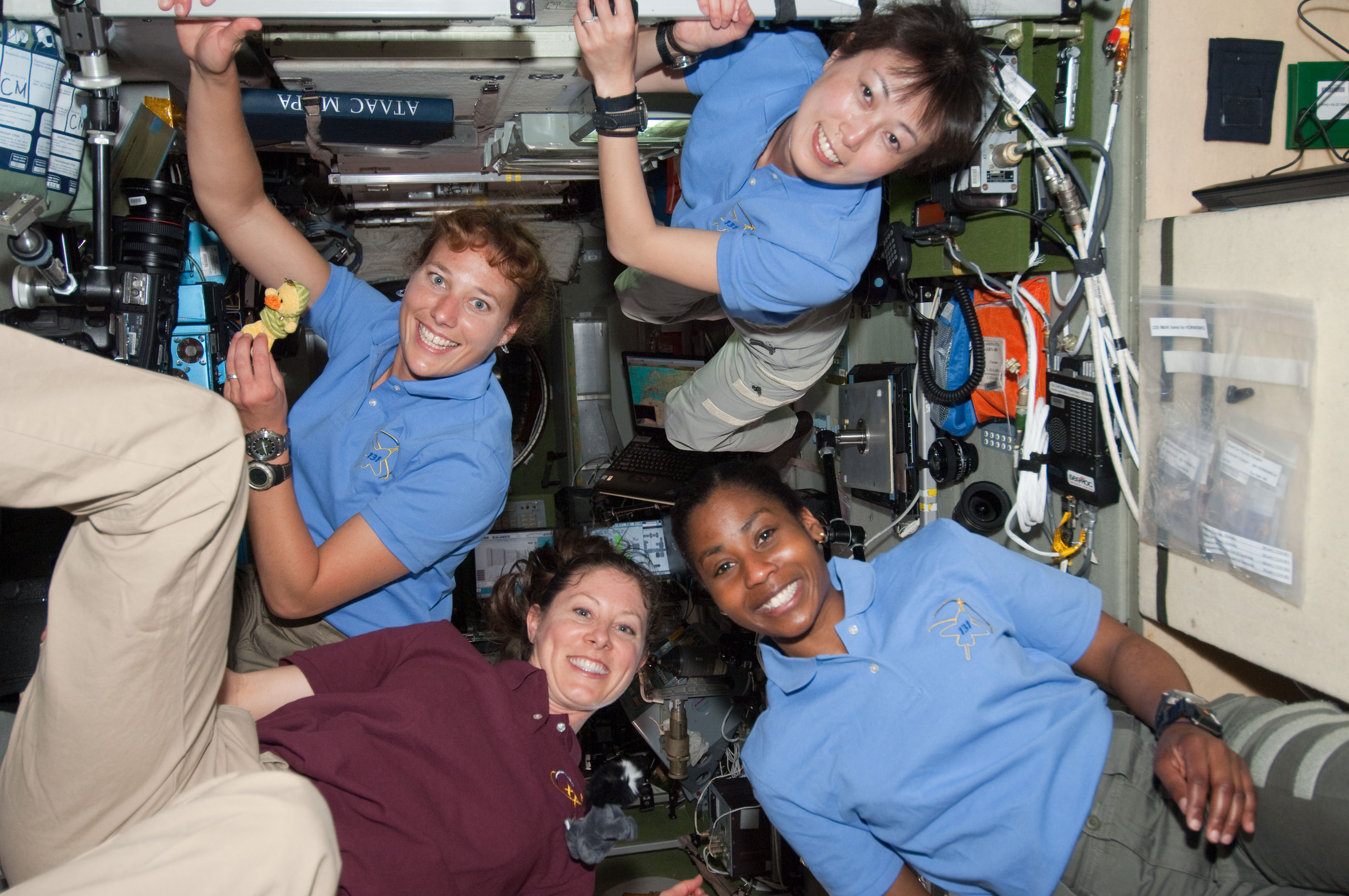
The four astronauts of STS-131 and Expedition 23 (Wilson to the bottom right), the first time four women being at the same time in space.

STS-131 (April 5–20, 2010) was a resupply mission to the International Space Station. Space Shuttle Discovery was launched pre-dawn from Kennedy Space Center. Once docked to the space station, the crew delivered more than 27,000 pounds of hardware, supplies, experiments and equipment, including a tank full of ammonia coolant that required three spacewalks and robotics to install, new crew sleeping quarters, a window observation facility and a freezer for experiments.

During the mission, Wilson was responsible for robotics for spacewalking support using the space station robotic arm and for robotic removal of the "Leonardo" Multi-Purpose Logistics Module from the payload bay of Discovery. For the return to Earth, Wilson robotically installed Leonardo, which was packed with more than 6,000 pounds of hardware, science results and used supplies, inside Discovery's payload bay. The STS-131 mission was accomplished in 15 days, 2 hours, 47 minutes, and 10 seconds and traveled 6,232,235 statute miles in 238 orbits.

==== Artemis ====
Artemis (2017–present) is the mission NASA announced in 2020 to return to the Moon. Wilson has been selected as one of 18 astronauts comprising the Artemis team.

== Personal life ==
Wilson is a Christian. She is a member of Alpha Kappa Alpha sorority. Her hobbies include skiing and stamp collecting. She married Julius "BJ" McCurdy, a television producer, in June 1999. The couple divorced in 2003.

== Awards and honors ==
- NASA Distinguished Service Medal (2009, 2011)
- NASA Space Flight Medal (2006, 2007, 2010)
- Honorary Doctorate of Science from Williams College (2011)
- Harvard College Women's Professional Achievement Award (2008)
- Harvard Foundation Scientist of the Year Award (2008)
- Young Outstanding Texas Exes Award (2005)
- Johnson Space Center Innovation Group Achievement Award (2013)
- Johnson Space Center Director Commendation Award (2013)
- Salem Trailblazer Award (2019)

== Spaceflight gallery ==
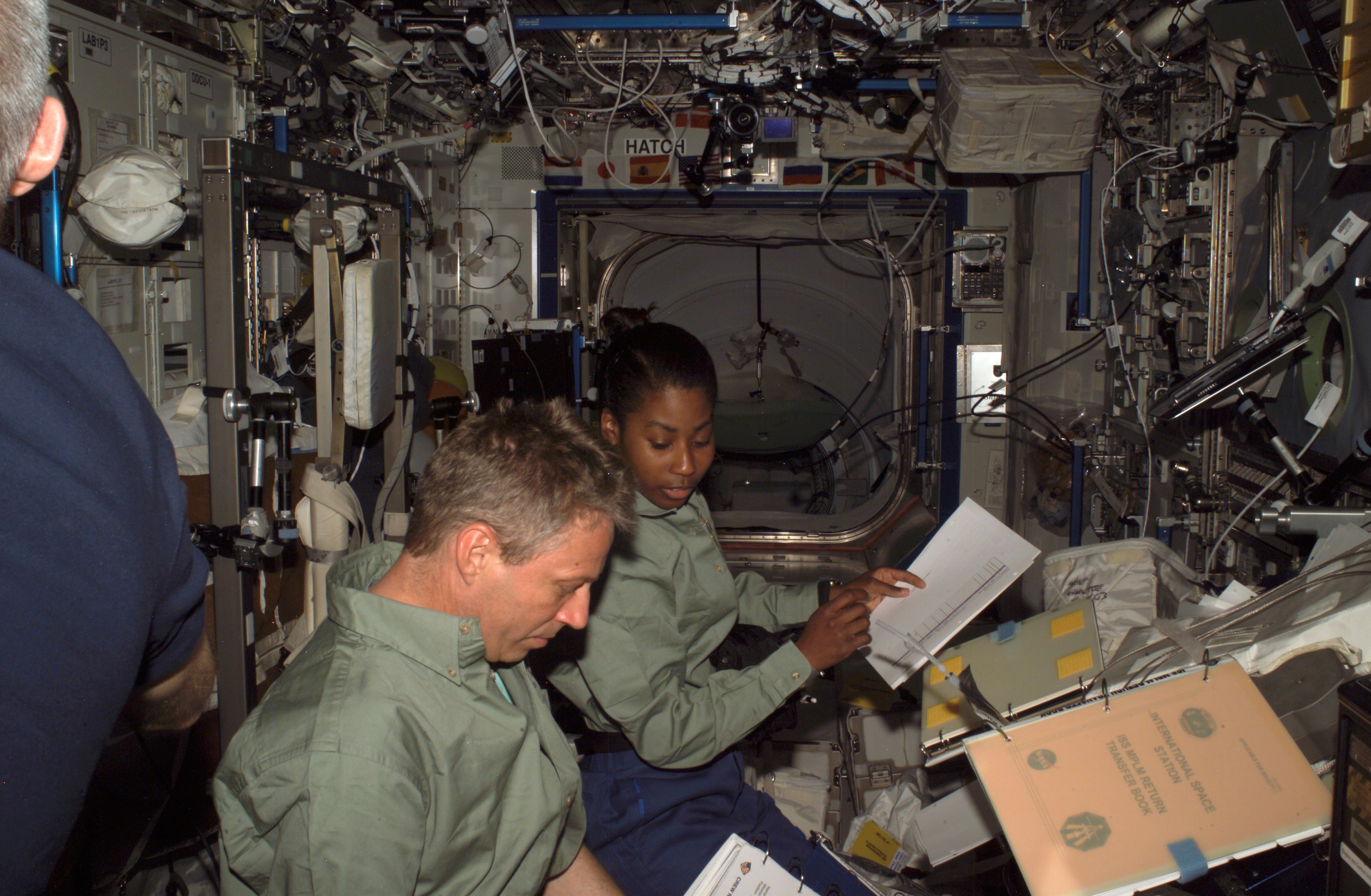
Wilson in the US lab during STS-121

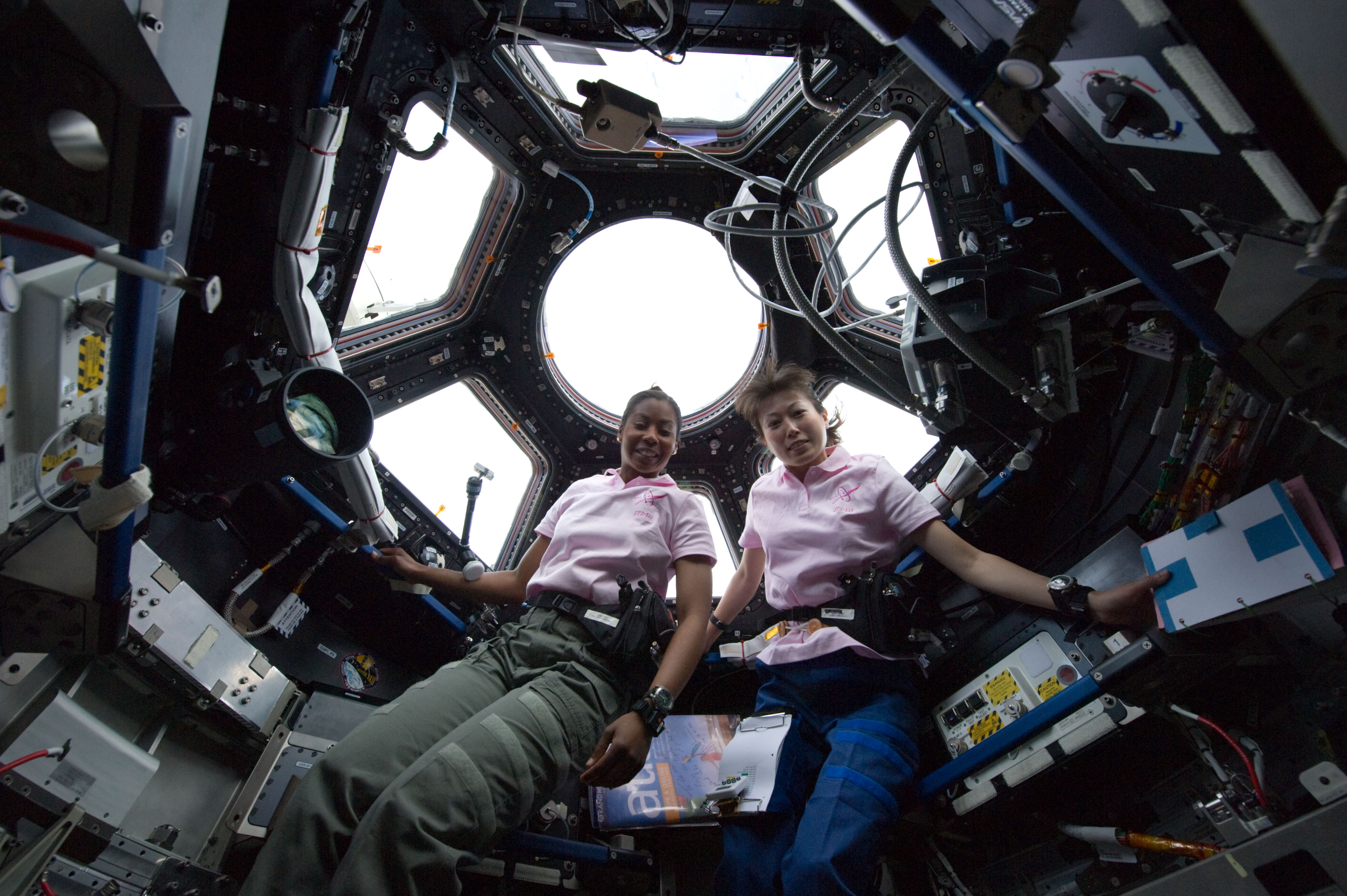
Stephanie Wilson in the Cupola during STS-131, with JAXA astronaut Naoko Yamazaki

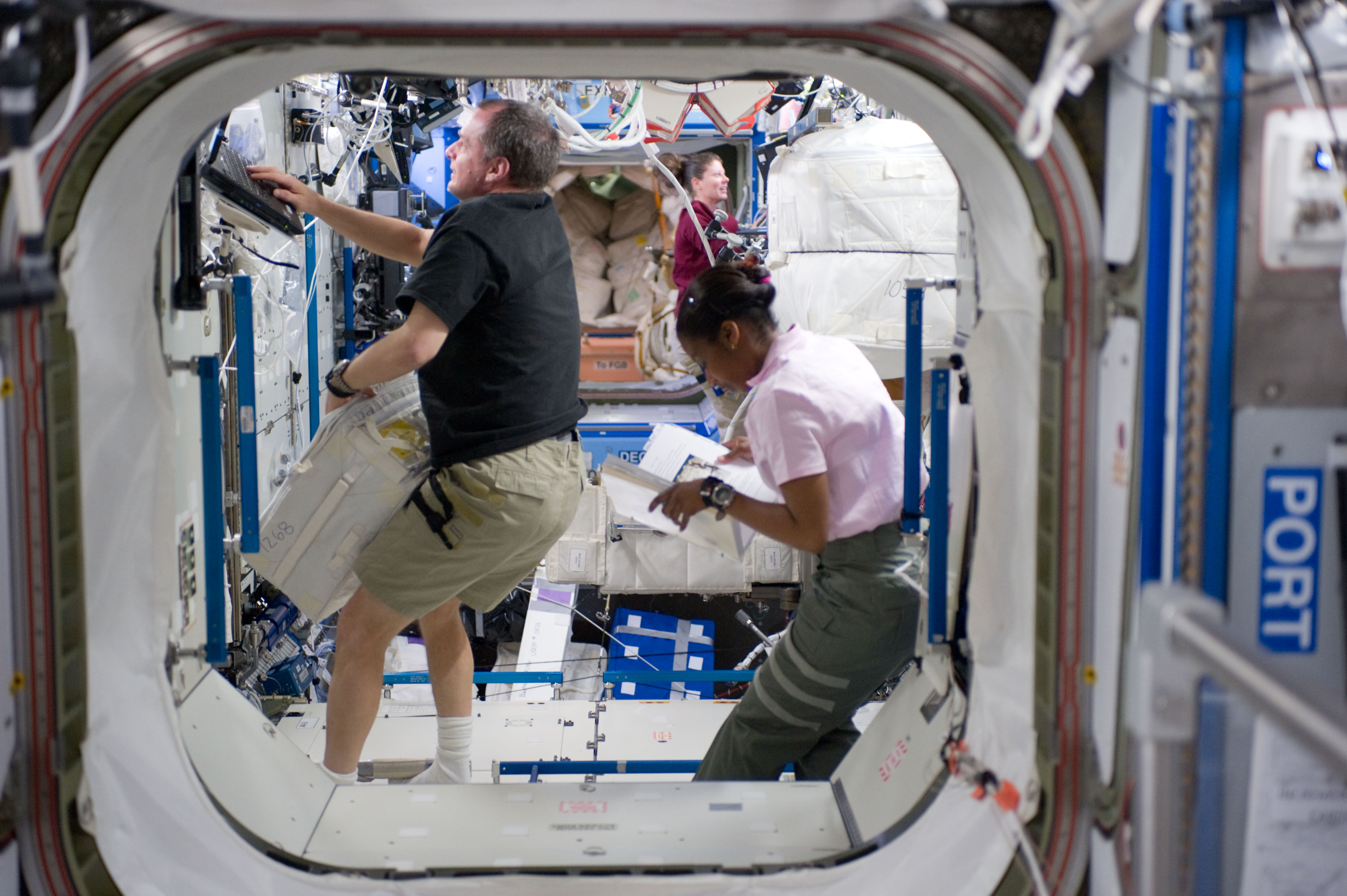
Wilson in the US lab, sorting out technical blueprints

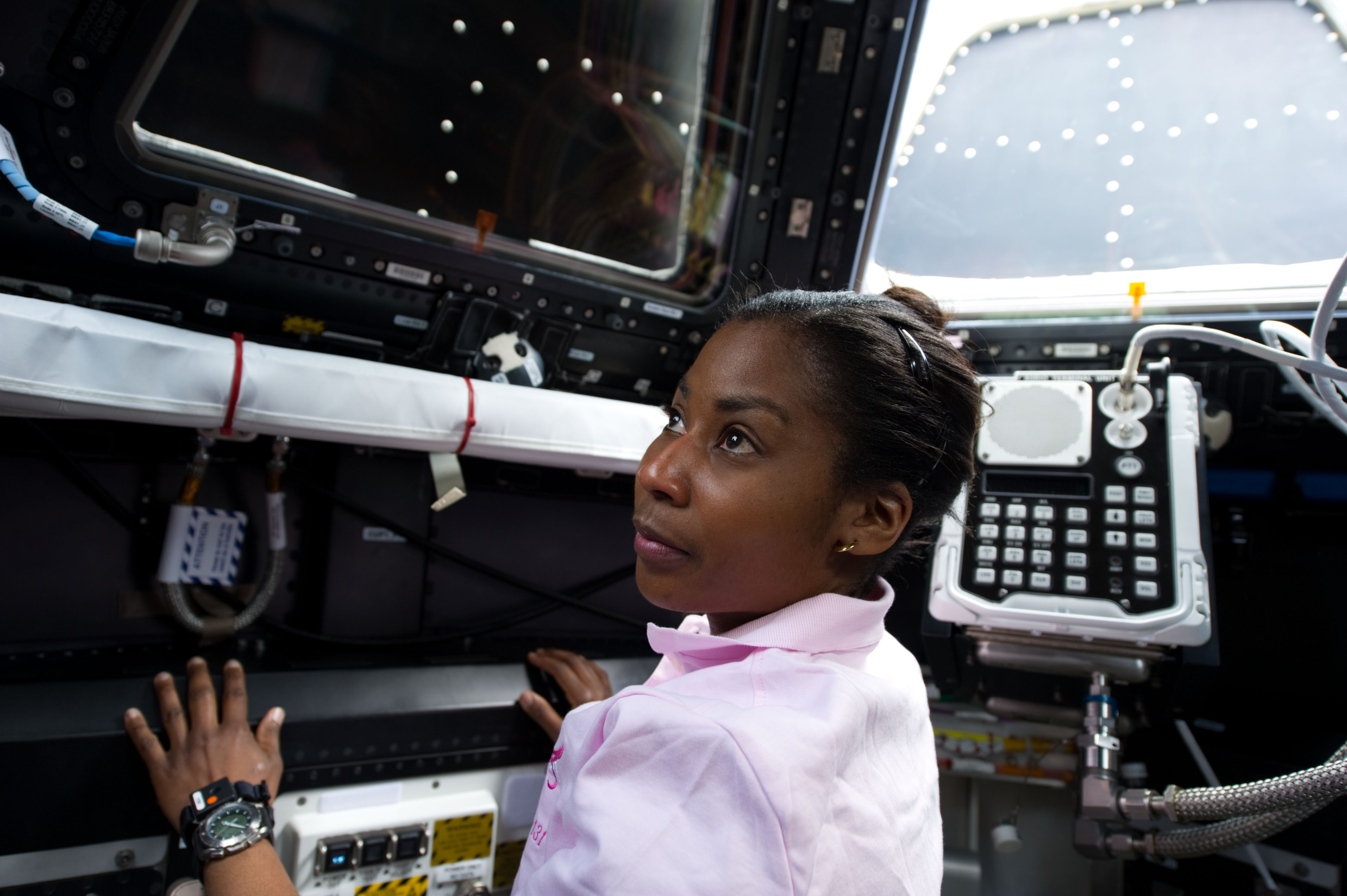
Observing the condition of the protective shutters in the Cupola during STS-131

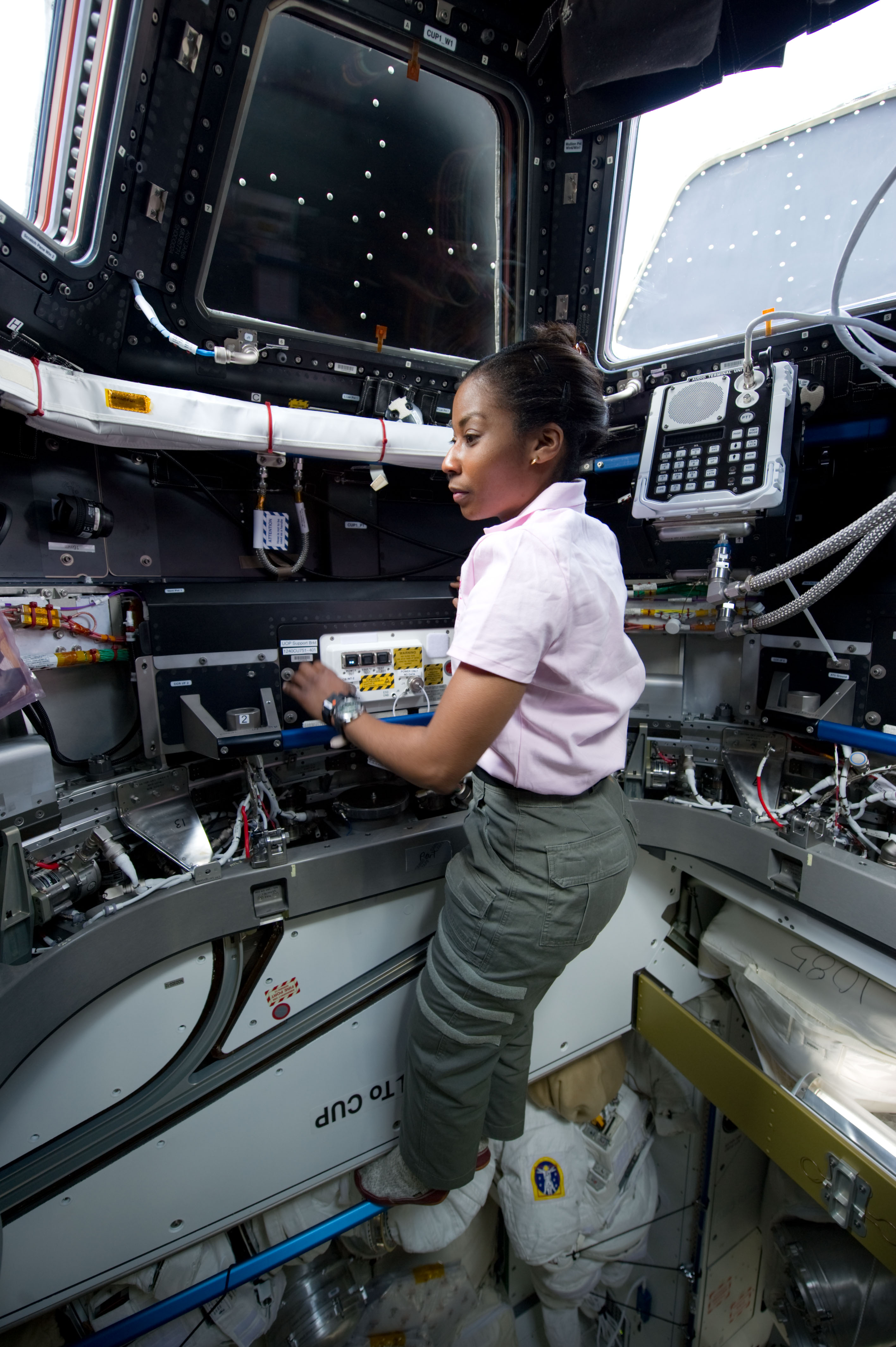
Stephanie relaxing to music in the Cupola during STS-131

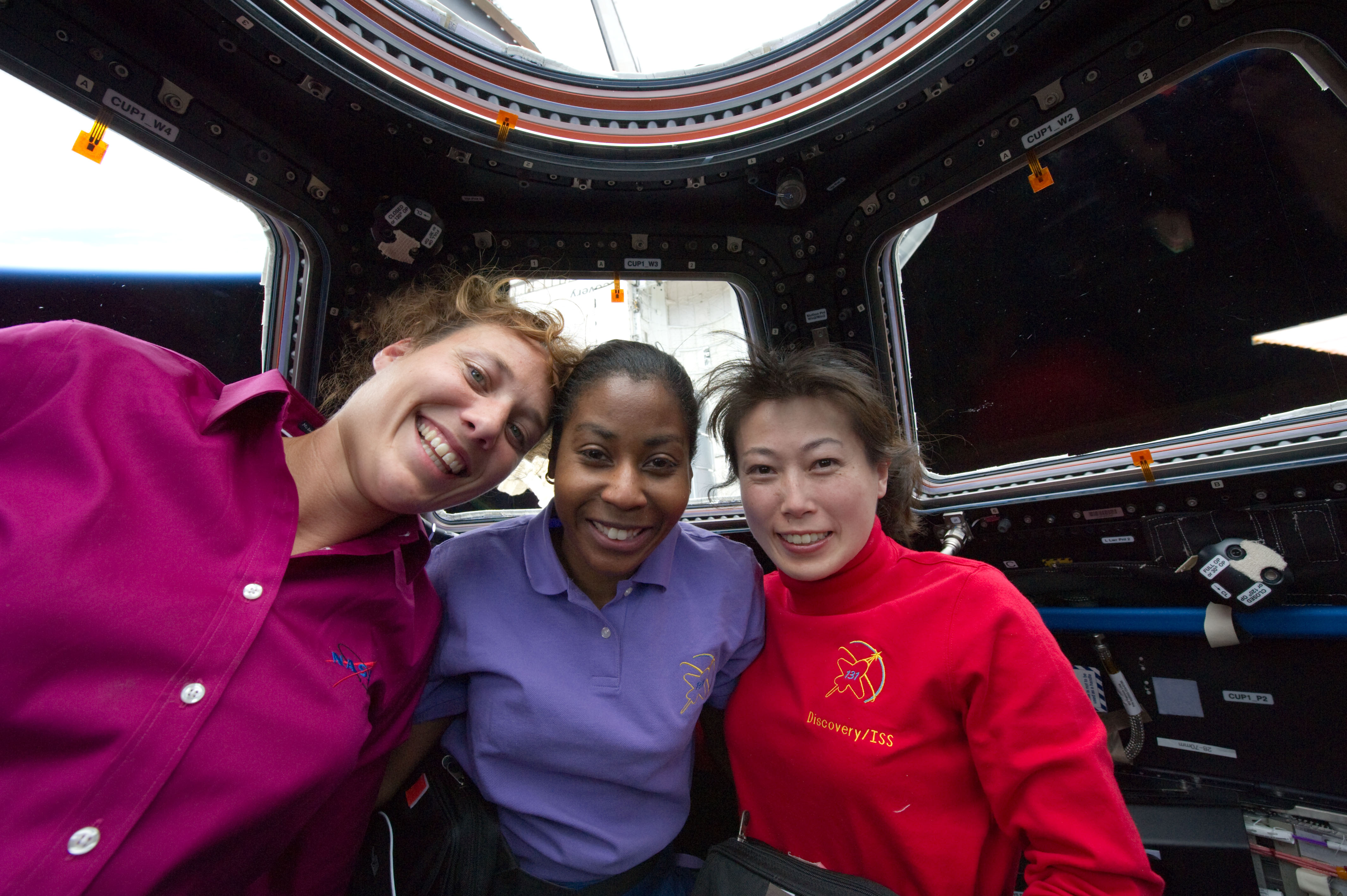
Group photo with Naoko Yamazaki and Dorothy Metcalf-Lindenburger

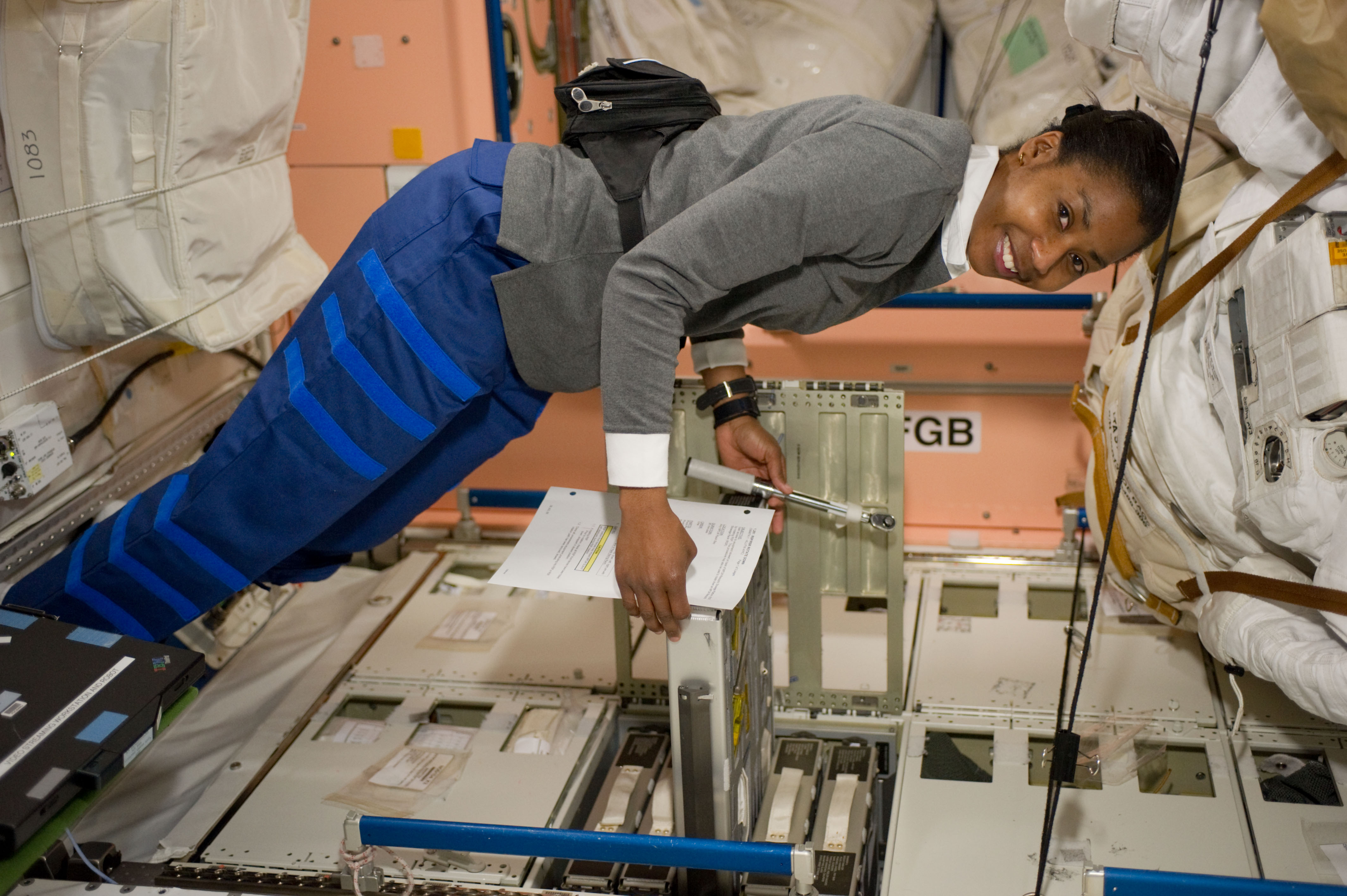
Wilson in Node 1

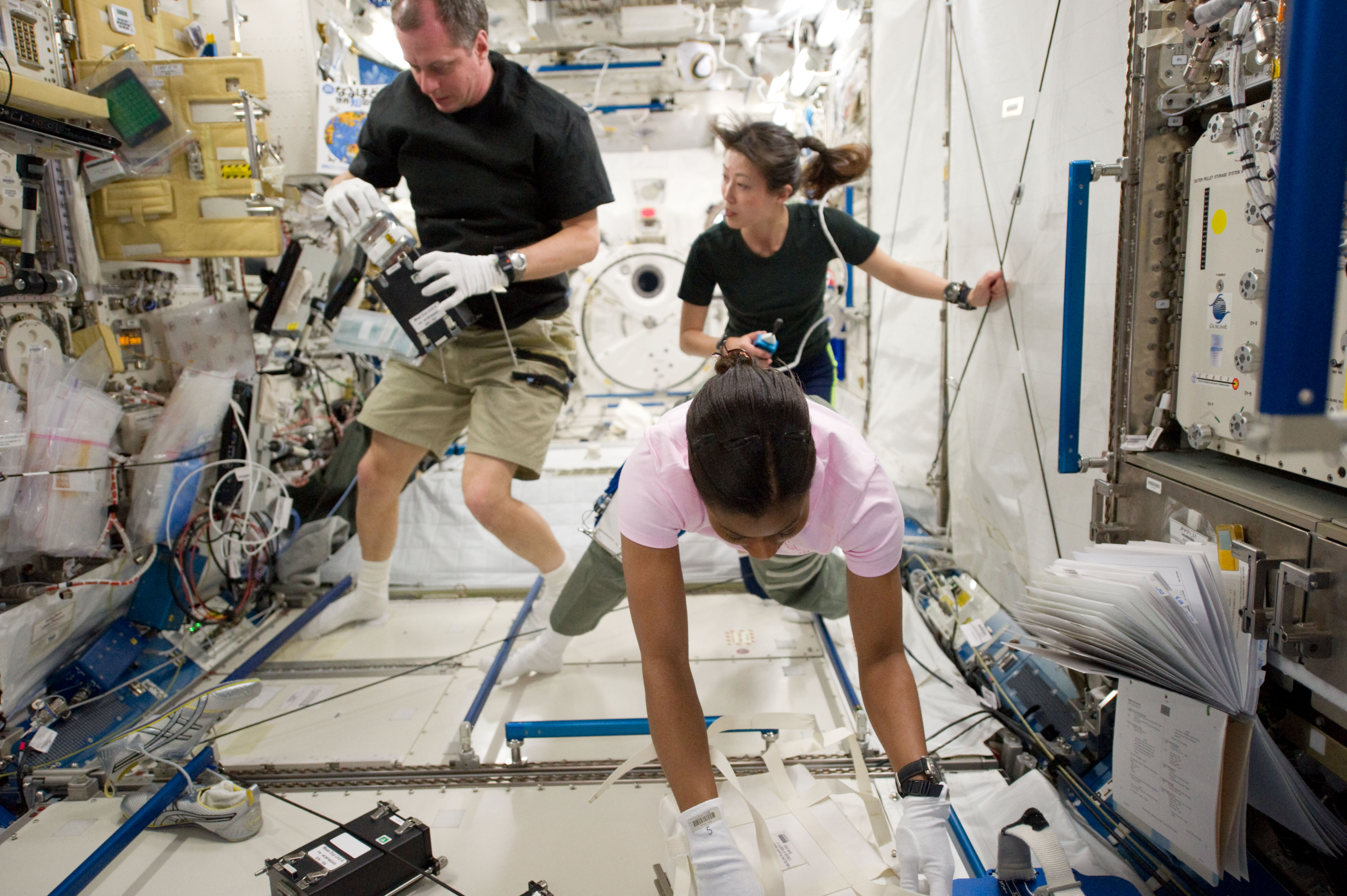
Inside Kibō, the Japanese Experiment Module

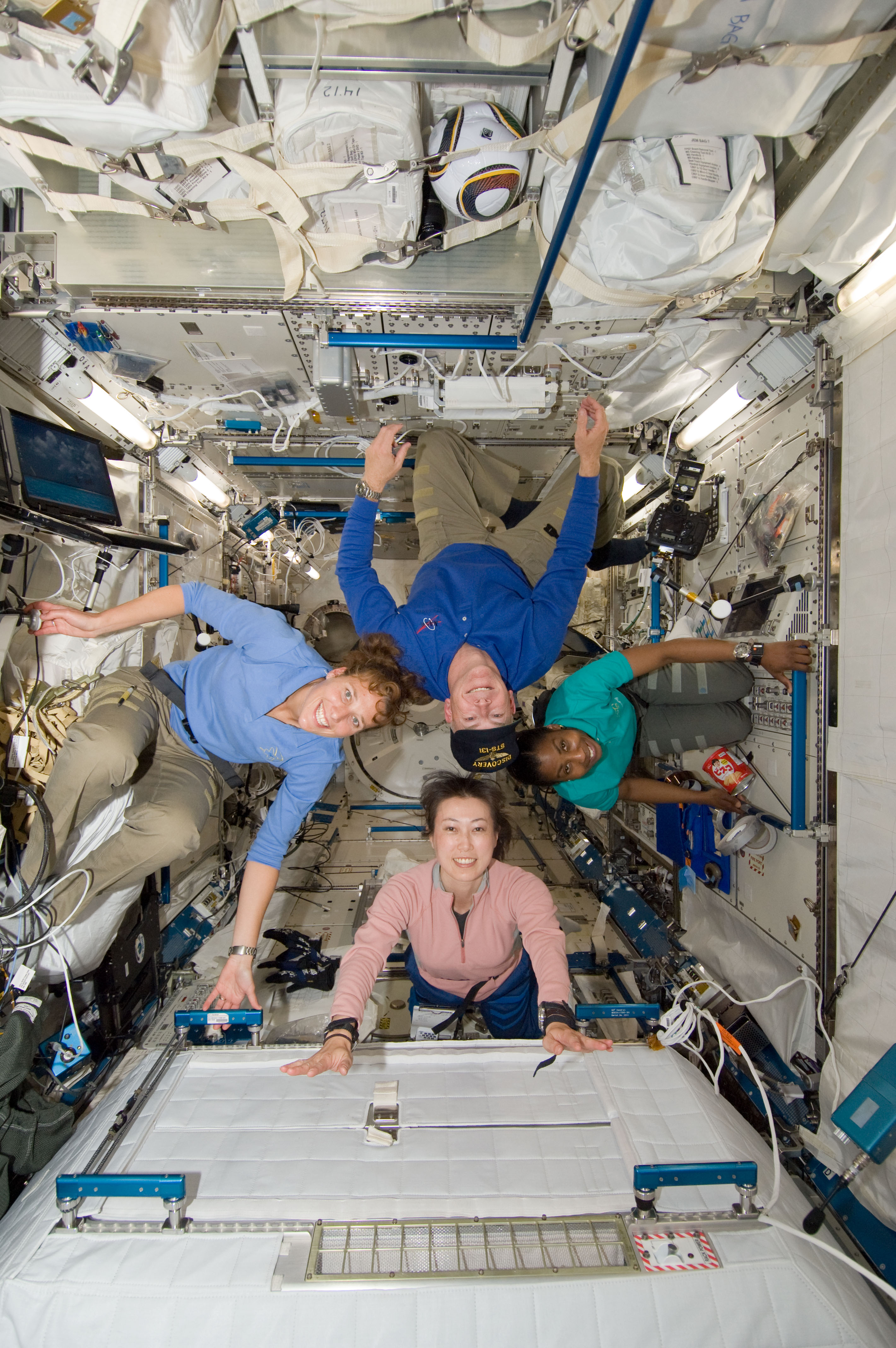
STS-131 crew playing around during their time work

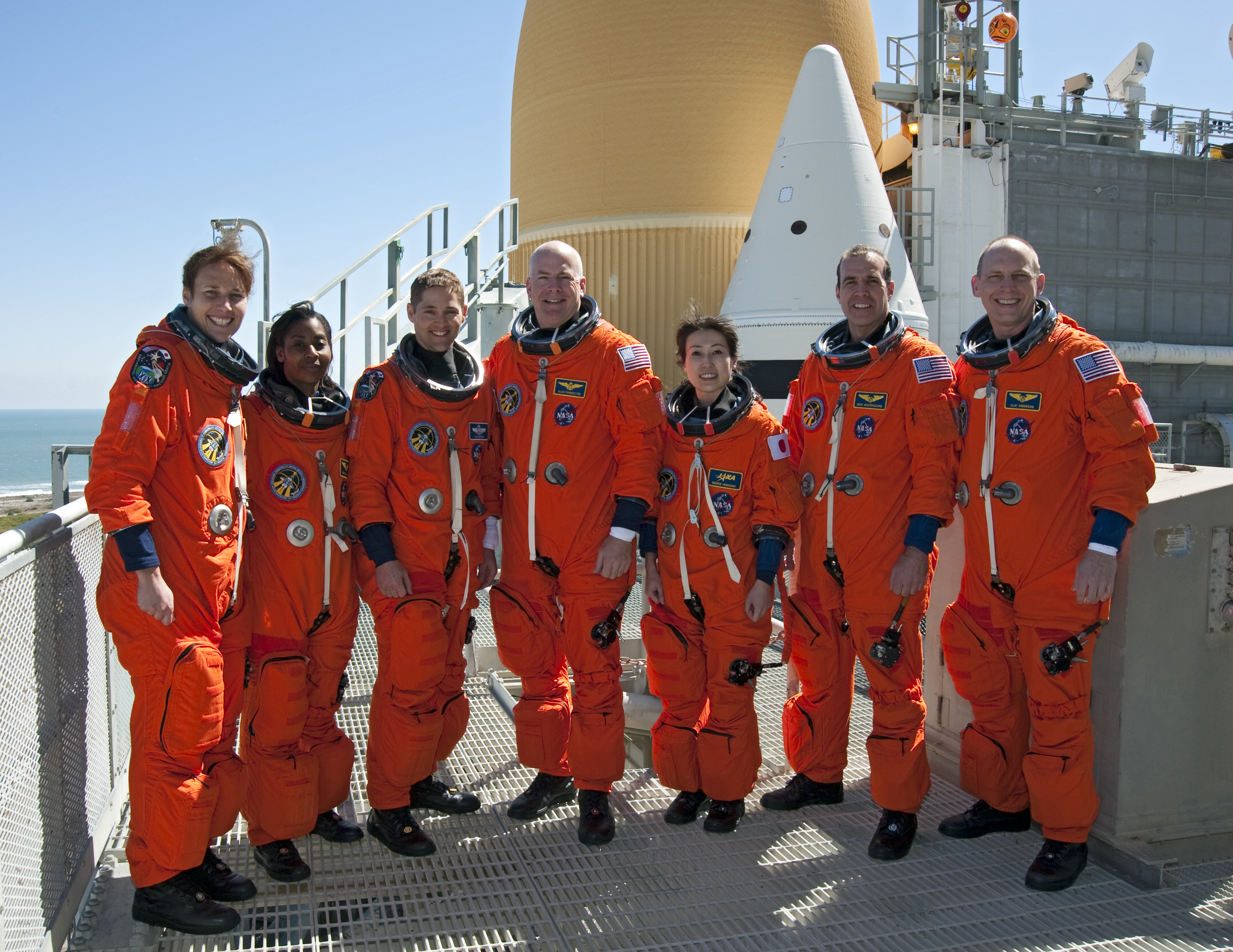
Atop the launch pad tower for STS-131

Mission highlights

== See also ==
- List of African-American astronauts
