= SpaceX Crew-9 =

2024 American crewed spaceflight to the ISS

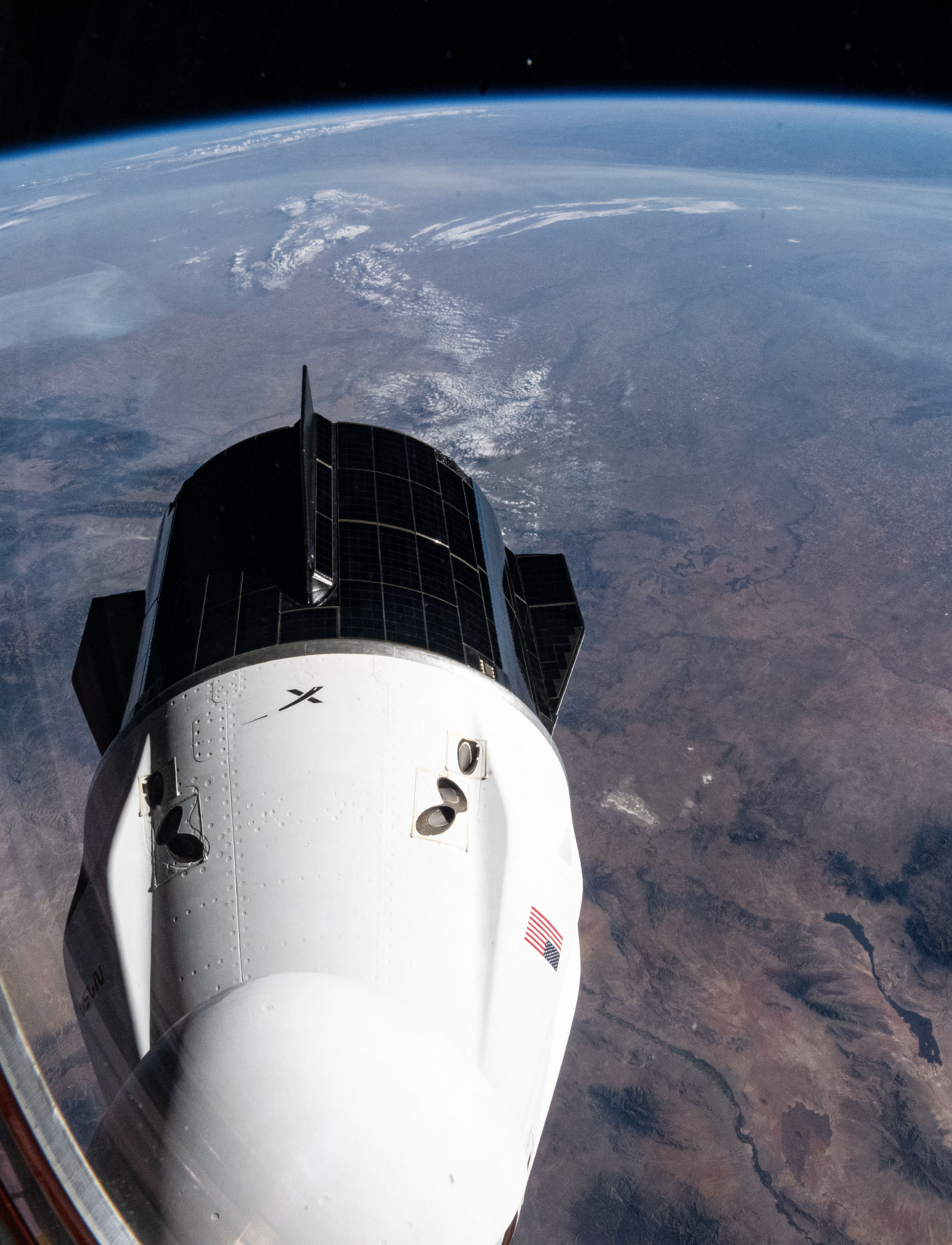
- Crew Dragon Freedom, attached to the ISS, as it passes over Colorado
- Names: USCV-9
- Mission type: ISS crew transport
- Operator: SpaceX
- COSPAR ID: 2024-178A
- SATCAT no.: 61447
- Mission duration: 171 days, 4 hours, 39 minutes

Spacecraft properties
- Spacecraft: Crew Dragon Freedom
- Spacecraft type: Crew Dragon
- Manufacturer: SpaceX

Crew
- Crew size: 2 up, 4 down
- Members: Nick Hague; Aleksandr Gorbunov
- Landing: Barry E. Wilmore; Sunita Williams
- Expedition: Expedition 72

Start of mission
- Launch date: September 28, 2024, 17:17:21 UTC (1:17:21 pm EDT)
- Rocket: Falcon 9 Block 5 (B1085‑2), Flight 378
- Launch site: Cape Canaveral, SLC‑40

End of mission
- Recovered by: MV Megan
- Landing date: March 18, 2025, 21:57:07 UTC (5:57:07 pm EDT)
- Landing site: Gulf of Mexico near Tallahassee, Florida (29°12′N 84°06′W)

Orbital parameters
- Reference system: Geocentric orbit
- Regime: Low Earth orbit
- Inclination: 51.65°

Docking with ISS
- Docking port: Harmony forward
- Docking date: September 29, 2024, 21:30 UTC
- Undocking date: November 3, 2024, 11:35 UTC
- Time docked: 34 days, 14 hours, 5 minutes

Docking with ISS (relocation)
- Docking port: Harmony zenith
- Docking date: 3 November 2024, 12:25 UTC
- Undocking date: March 18, 2025, 05:05 UTC
- Time docked: 134 days, 16 hours, 40 minutes
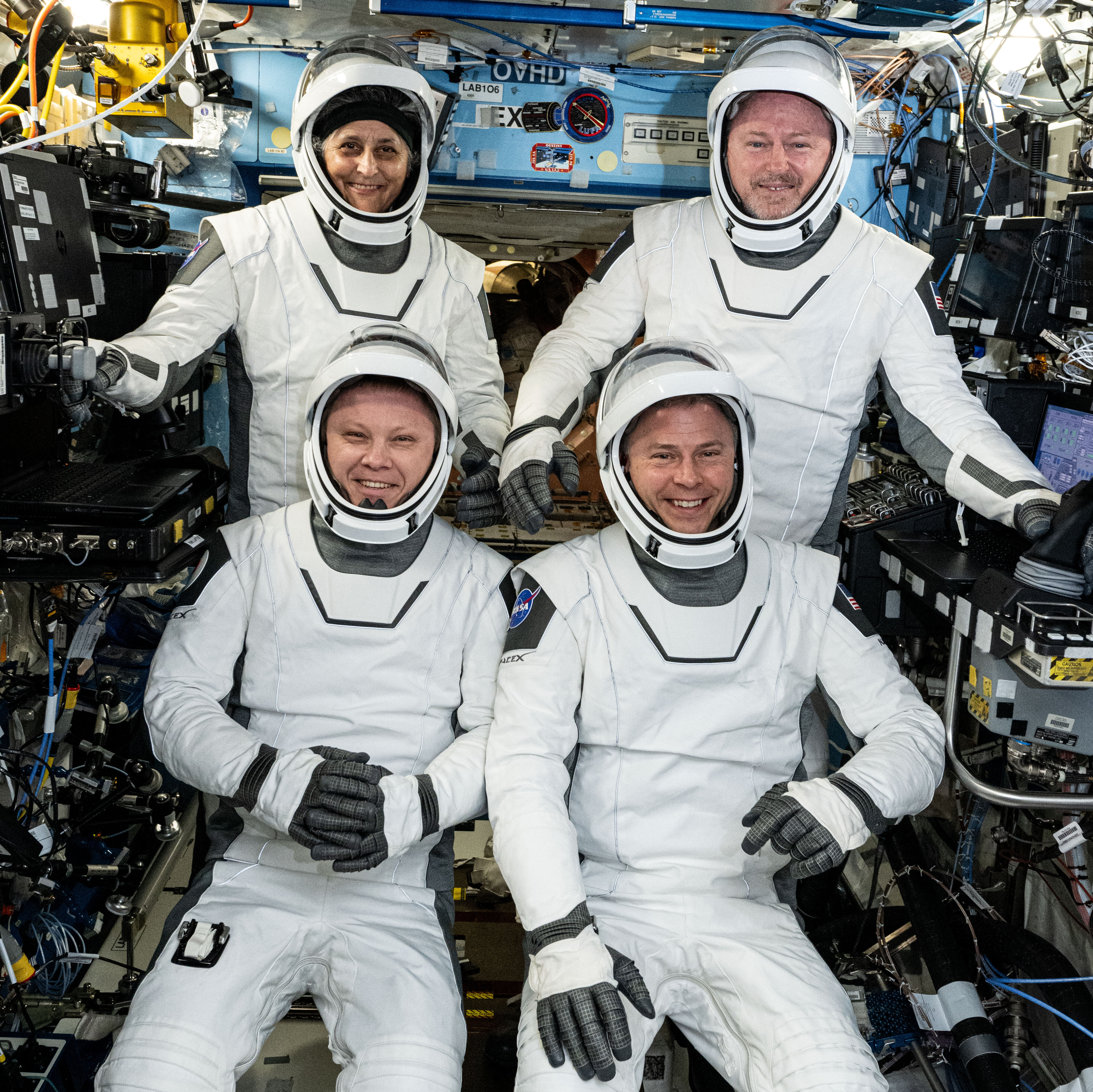
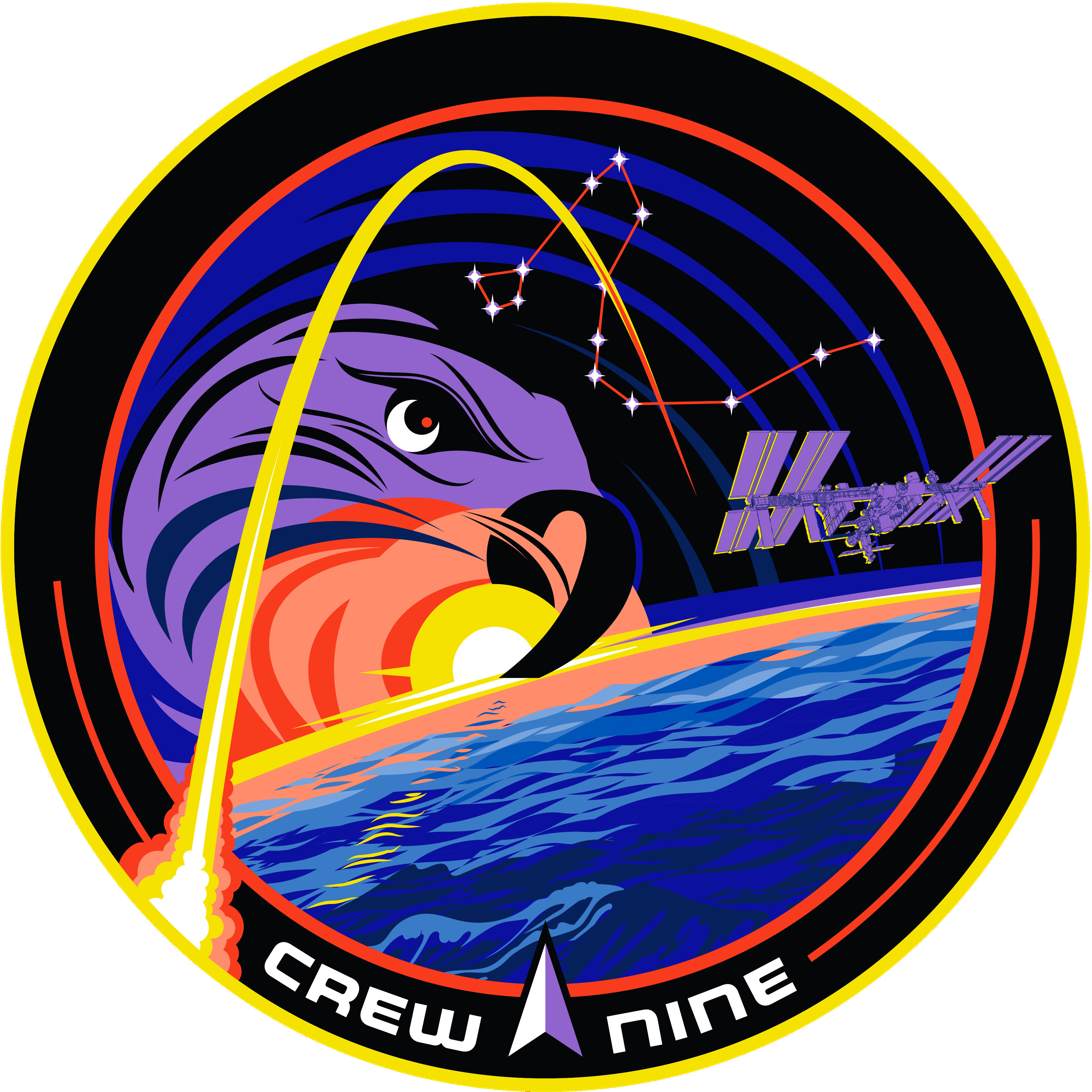
- NASA (left) and SpaceX (right) mission patches (Top, from left) landing crew: Williams and Wilmore (Bottom, from left) launching and landing crew: Gorbunov and Hague Commercial Crew Program Crew Dragon flights

SpaceX Crew-9 was the ninth operational NASA Commercial Crew Program flight and the 15th crewed orbital flight of a Crew Dragon spacecraft. Originally scheduled to carry a crew of four to the International Space Station (ISS) in mid-August 2024, the mission was delayed by more than a month by problems with the Boeing Starliner Calypso spacecraft that was docked at the ISS for the Boeing Crew Flight Test.

In response, NASA decided to send the Boeing capsule back to Earth uncrewed on September 7, 2024 and on September 28, launch Crew-9 with two crew members, Nick Hague and Aleksandr Gorbunov. The two Crew-9 members would then later return with two additional crew members, Sunita Williams and Barry E. Willmore, of the Boeing Crew Flight Test, for a total of four crew members aboard the Dragon capsule.

Crew-9 launched on September 28, 2024 at 17:17:21 UTC (1:17:21 pm EDT, local time at the launch site) and returned on March 18, 2025, at 21:57:07 UTC (5:57:07 pm EDT), concluding the mission with a successful splashdown in the Gulf of Mexico.

The Crew-9 mission marked several milestones. It was the first crewed mission to launch from Cape Canaveral Space Launch Complex 40; astronaut Nick Hague was the first active U.S. Space Force Guardian to launch to space; and the mission was the last Dragon capsule to splash down in the eastern United States.

== Crew ==
The mission was initially to bring four crew members to the International Space Station (ISS): NASA astronauts Zena Cardman, Nick Hague, and Stephanie Wilson, and Roscosmos cosmonaut Aleksandr Gorbunov. Cardman was to be the commander and Hague the pilot, while Wilson and Gorbunov would serve as mission specialists. However, due to technical problems with the Boeing Starliner, NASA decided to return the Starliner uncrewed and launch Crew-9 with two open seats to return the Boeing Crew Flight Test astronauts to Earth.

On August 24, 2024, NASA administrator Bill Nelson, along with a panel of agency officials, announced that the Boeing Starliner would return uncrewed, and its astronauts would return on Crew-9. On August 30, NASA announced that Hague and Gorbunov would fly on Crew-9 with Hague serving as commander. Gorbunov was required to fly as part of a NASA-Roscosmos crew interchange agreement. Before the official announcement, Ars Technica reported that there was disagreement within NASA over who should fill the commander's seat in those six days. According to the reporting, NASA Chief Astronaut, Joe Acaba had initially selected Cardman to continue as commander, which had been met with some concerns in the astronaut office, stemming from NASA's history of never launching a mission without a test pilot or experienced astronaut in command. Both Cardman and Gorbunov are rookie astronauts who have never served as a test pilot. Hague, on the other hand, has prior spaceflight experience and is one of the few individuals who have survived a launch abort (with Soyuz MS-10).

Following the crew changes, SpaceX, NASA, Cardman, Hague, Wilson, and Gorbunov collaborated for three weeks to identify how Hague could assume many of the tasks typically divided between the commander and pilot and determine which tasks could be assigned to Gorbunov, who would sit in the pilot's seat during launch. While Gorbunov is a qualified engineer and holds the rank of test cosmonaut (making him eligible to be a Soyuz commander), he had only previously received basic training on the Dragon in his role as a mission specialist. Although only serving in a limited capacity, Gorbunov became the first Russian cosmonaut to be at the controls of an American spacecraft.

Position	Launching crew	Landing crew
Commander	Nick Hague, NASA; Expedition 72; Second (Note: Not counting the aborted flight of Soyuz MS-10.) and last spaceflight	
Mission specialist	Aleksandr Gorbunov, Roscosmos; Expedition 72; First spaceflight	
Mission specialist	None	Sunita Williams, NASA; Expedition 71/72; Third and last spaceflight Launched on Boeing Crew Flight Test
Mission specialist	None	Barry E. Wilmore, NASA; Expedition 71/72; Third and last spaceflight Launched on Boeing Crew Flight Test

=== Original crew ===
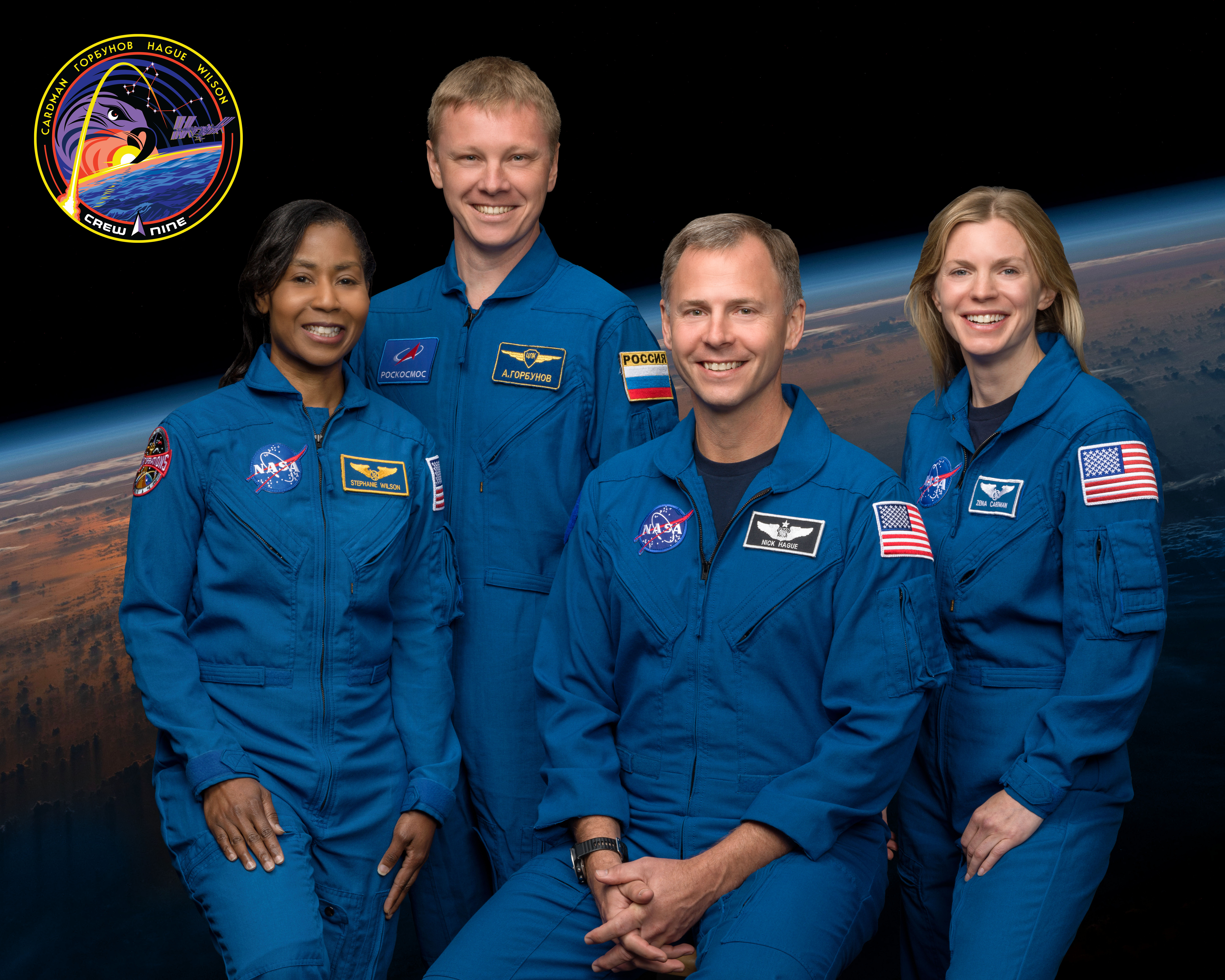
Original crew, from left: Wilson, Gorbunov, Hague, and Cardman, inset depicts the original mission patch

Position	Crew
Commander	Zena Cardman, NASA; Expedition 71/72; Would have been first spaceflight
Pilot	Nick Hague, NASA; Expedition 71/72; Second and last spaceflight
Mission specialist	Stephanie Wilson, NASA; Expedition 71/72; Would have been fourth spaceflight
Mission specialist	Aleksandr Gorbunov, Roscosmos; Expedition 71/72; First spaceflight

== Mission ==
SpaceX Crew-9 is the ninth operational NASA Commercial Crew Program flight to the International Space Station (ISS) and the 15th crewed orbital mission for a SpaceX Dragon spacecraft. The flight was originally planned to deliver four crew members to the ISS for Expedition 72, a six-month science mission: NASA astronauts Zena Cardman (commander), Nick Hague (pilot), and Stephanie Wilson (mission specialist), along with Roscosmos cosmonaut Aleksandr Gorbunov (mission specialist). However, NASA decided to return the two astronauts of the Starliner crewed flight test, using Crew-9. Therefore, Crew-9 launched with a crew of two instead. Hague served as commander, flying alongside Gorbunov.

The Dragon spacecraft, named Freedom, is a veteran of the SpaceX Crew-4 and Axiom Space's Ax-2 and Ax-3 missions. The Falcon 9 first-stage booster, designated B1085, made its second flight.

Originally scheduled for August 18, 2024, the launch was rescheduled to September 24 after NASA decided to return the Boeing Starliner Calypso spacecraft of the Boeing Crew Flight Test without its crew. This delay provided NASA additional time to assess the Starliner's condition, develop a safe return plan for its crew, and reconfigure the Starliner's software for an uncrewed return. ISS has only two IDSS ports, and one was occupied by Crew-8 while the other was occupied by Starliner. Therefore, Crew-9 did not launch until after Starliner undocked. Until Crew-9 arrived, they arranged to use SpaceX Crew-8 as their temporary emergency evacuation spacecraft, after which they transferred to Crew-9.

Crew-9 was slated to use Launch Complex 39A (LC-39A) at Kennedy Space Center, which had supported all previous SpaceX's crewed missions and is also the only pad that can support Falcon Heavy launches. When Crew-9's launch was rescheduled to September 24, it was brought close to the launch NASA's Europa Clipper mission, which needed to launch from LC-39A on a Falcon Heavy during a 21-day window in early October. To avoid scheduling conflicts and ensure ample preparation time for both missions, SpaceX shifted the Crew-9 launch to Space Launch Complex 40 at Cape Canaveral Space Force Station. This was the first crewed mission to lift off from SLC-40. SpaceX had been constructing a crew access tower at this location since 2023 to facilitate such operations.

Hague, a U.S. Space Force colonel, is the first active member of the Space Force to launch into space since the branch was established in 2019. Because the launch moved to SLC-40, the mission also marks the first time a Space Force service member launched from a Space Force launch complex.

Crew Dragon Freedom was relocated from the forward port of the Harmony module to the zenith (space facing) port to free up the forward port for CRS-31. All four astronauts that would later be returning home on Freedom were aboard the capsule for the relocation because the spacecraft is also the crew's "lifeboat".

The mission featured the last Dragon capsule splashdown in the Gulf of Mexico in March 2025. While SpaceX Dragon 1 missions had previously landed in the Pacific, SpaceX and NASA had shifted recovery operations to the Eastern U.S. in 2019. The move allowed astronauts and critical cargo to return to Kennedy Space Center more quickly after splashdown, and SpaceX opened a facility in Florida to take in capsules after flight and prepare them for the next mission. However, the move had an unforeseen consequence: the trunk module had to be jettisoned before reentry, and while the team expected it would burn up, SpaceX became aware of at least four cases of trunk debris being found on land. The shift back to Pacific Ocean splashdowns means that the trunk can stay attached longer and be directed towards a remote area of the ocean called Point Nemo (nicknamed the spacecraft cemetery), where any debris that survives reentry will be unlikely to cause damage.

SpaceX Crew-10, carrying four astronauts to replace Crew-9, arrived at the ISS on March 16, 2025. NASA typically schedules a week-long handover period to allow extra staffing aboard the station while the new crew completes orientation tasks and the departing crew prepares for their return. However, due to a delay in an upcoming supply flight, which necessitated conserving resources like food, and a brief window of favorable weather in the Gulf of Mexico for splashdown, the handover was shortened to just two days.

== Launch ==
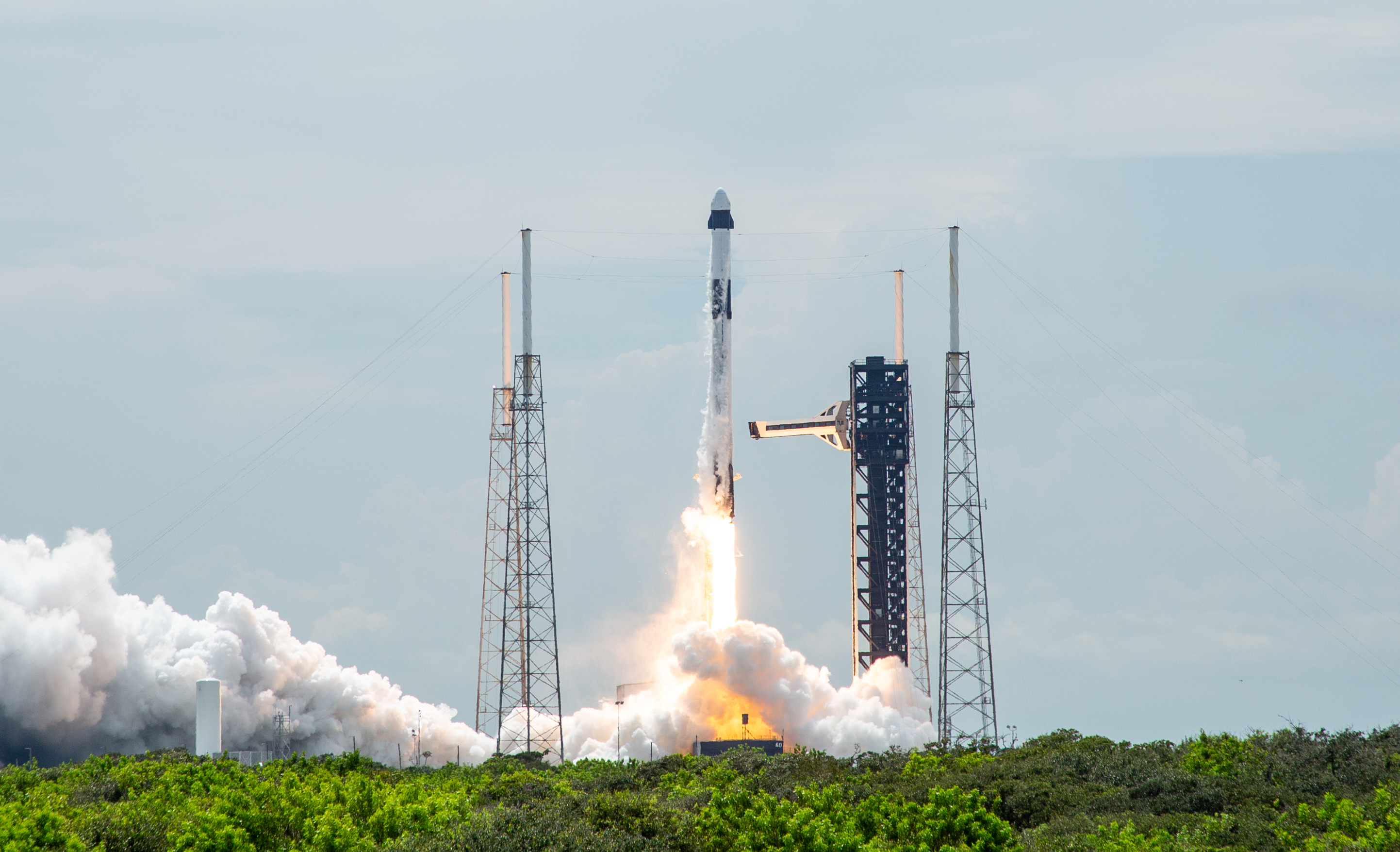
Crew Dragon Freedom launches atop a Falcon 9 rocket from Cape Canaveral Space Launch Complex 40.

Hague and Gorbunov arrived at Kennedy Space Center on Saturday, September 21, 2024, to prepare for their mission. The crew was scheduled to quarantine at the Operations and Checkout Building, where they conducted a dry dress rehearsal, adjusted their sleep schedules, and rehearsed flight procedures. At the time, the launch date was set for Thursday, September 26.

On Tuesday, September 24, the SpaceX Falcon 9 rocket and Crew Dragon Freedom capsule were rolled out to SLC-40. However, due to the approaching Hurricane Helene, NASA announced that the Crew-9 launch was delayed until Saturday, September 28.

Following a successful static fire and final dress rehearsal on Tuesday, the SpaceX Dragon and Falcon 9 rocket were rolled back to the hangar on Wednesday, September 25, 2024, as a precaution against potential weather impacts from Hurricane Helene, which was forecast to make landfall near the Florida panhandle on Thursday, September 26.

Crew-9 was able to lift off on the first attempt on September 28, 2024, at 17:17:21 UTC (1:17:21 pm EDT, local time at the launch site). It was the first-ever human spaceflight to lift off from Space Launch Complex-40 (SLC-40) at Florida's Cape Canaveral Space Force Station. With a launch weather forecast that predicted a 45% chance of violating weather constraints and rain clouds that passed by as the crew boarded the rocket, NASA leaders later remarked that they had "threaded a needle" regarding the weather. After lifting the Dragon and second-stage to an altitude of 70 kilometers (43 mi; 38 nmi) the rocket's first stage, Booster 1085 returned to the Cape Canaveral Space Force Station and touched down at Landing Zone 1, seven minutes and 36 seconds after launch, completing its second flight. The second stage continued to lift the Dragon to an altitude of 200 kilometers (120 mi; 110 nmi) before separation.

A few hours later, when the second stage was commanded to make a destructive reentry, it experienced an off-nominal deorbit burn, deviating from its planned trajectory. Although it landed safely in the ocean, the impact point was outside the designated target area. SpaceX typically commands its second stages to re-enter the atmosphere and land in the ocean to minimize orbital debris. The off-target landing increased the potential risk of harm, as aircraft and mariners were not instructed to avoid the area. In response, SpaceX announced a temporary grounding of the Falcon 9 rocket while investigating the root cause of the mishap. On September 30, 2024, the Federal Aviation Administration grounded the Falcon 9. An exception was made for the launch of ESA's Hera. The FAA cleared the Falcon 9 to resume flights on October 11.

=== Launch attempt summary ===
Note: Times are local to the launch site (Eastern Daylight Time).

Attempt	Planned	Result	Turnaround	Reason	Decision point	Weather go (%)	Notes
1	26 Sep 2024, 2:05:00 pm	Scrubbed	—	Weather	24 Sep 2024, 2:00 pm		Scrubbed due to the approach of Hurricane Helene; rocket rolled back to hangar.
2	28 Sep 2024, 1:17:21 pm	Success	1 day 23 hours 12 minutes			70	Weather forecast was initially 55%.

== Gallery ==
SpaceX Crew-9
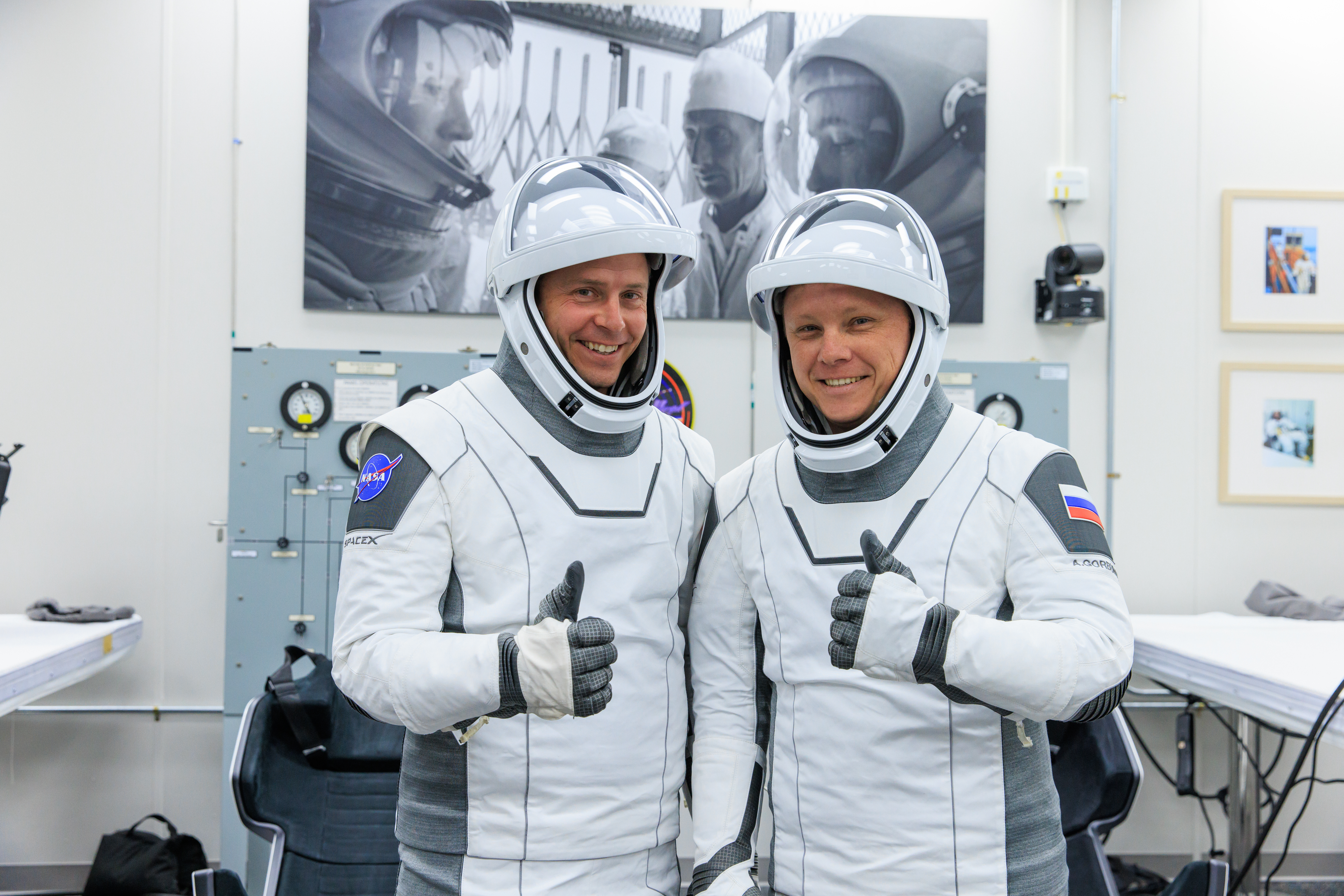
Hague and Gorbunov suited up in the Operations and Checkout Building before launch

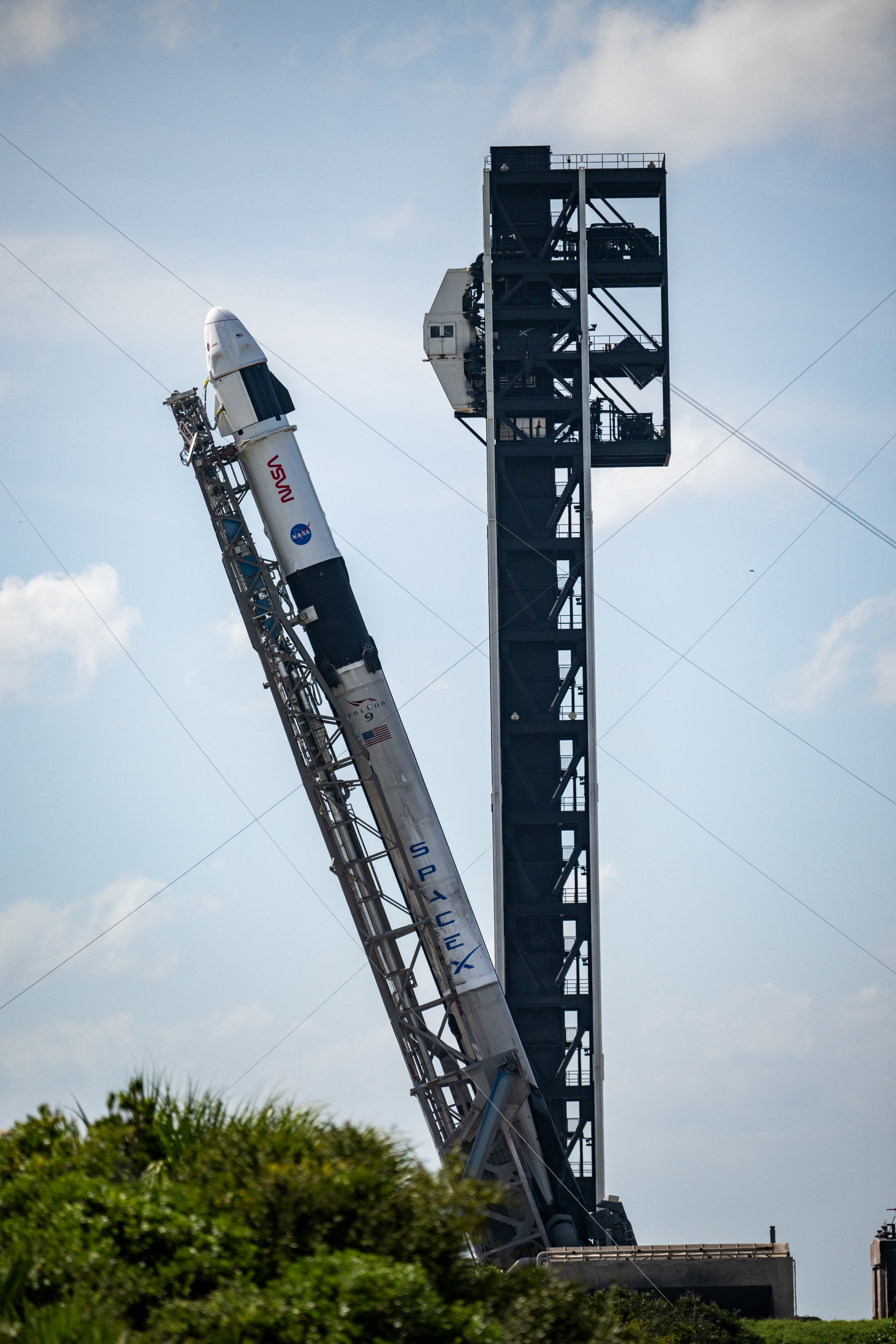
The strongback tilts the Falcon 9 rocket carrying the Crew Dragon Freedom to a vertical position at SLC-40

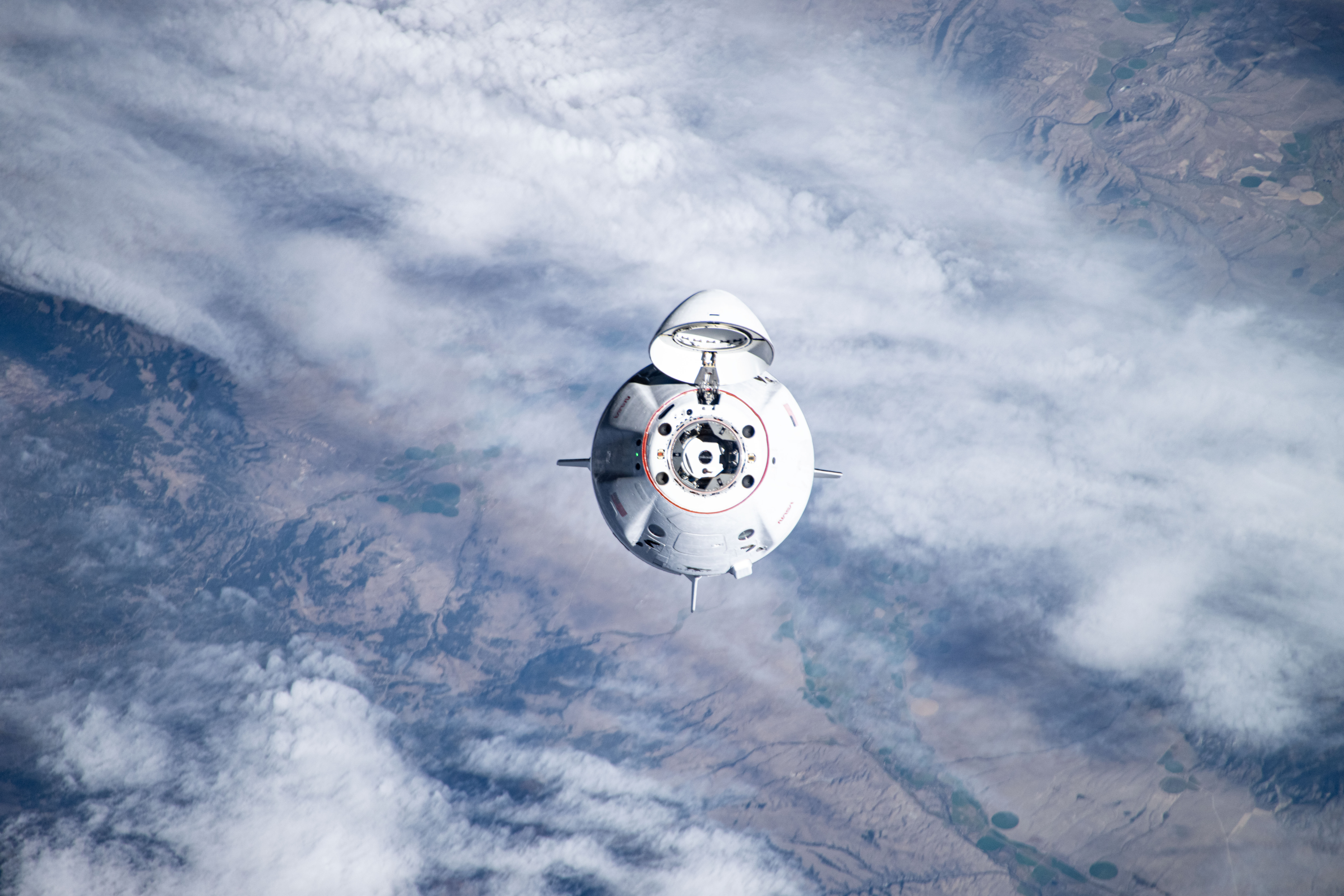
Crew Dragon Freedom approaches the International Space Station

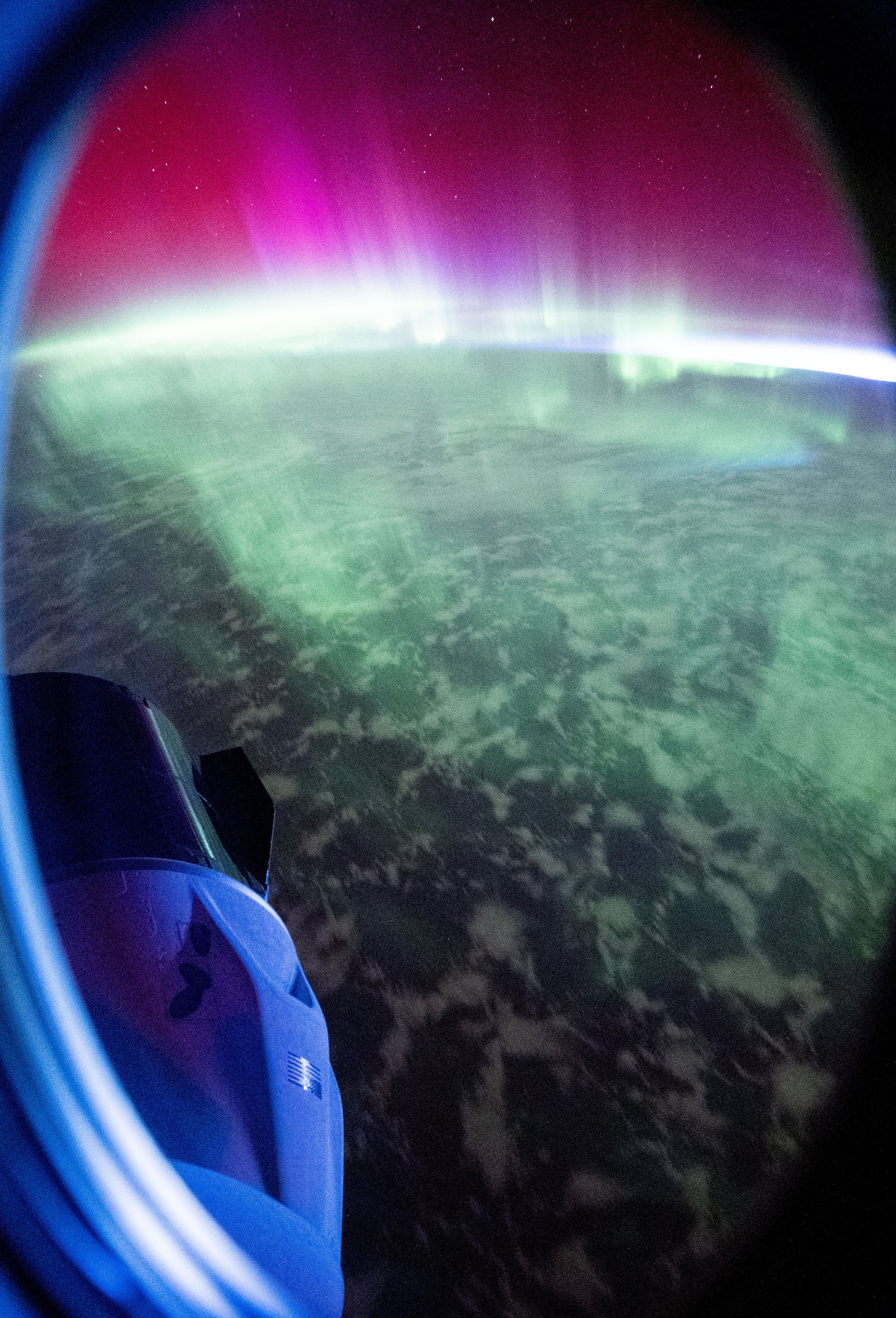
Crew Dragon Freedom illuminated in a blue glow as auroras move through Earth's atmosphere

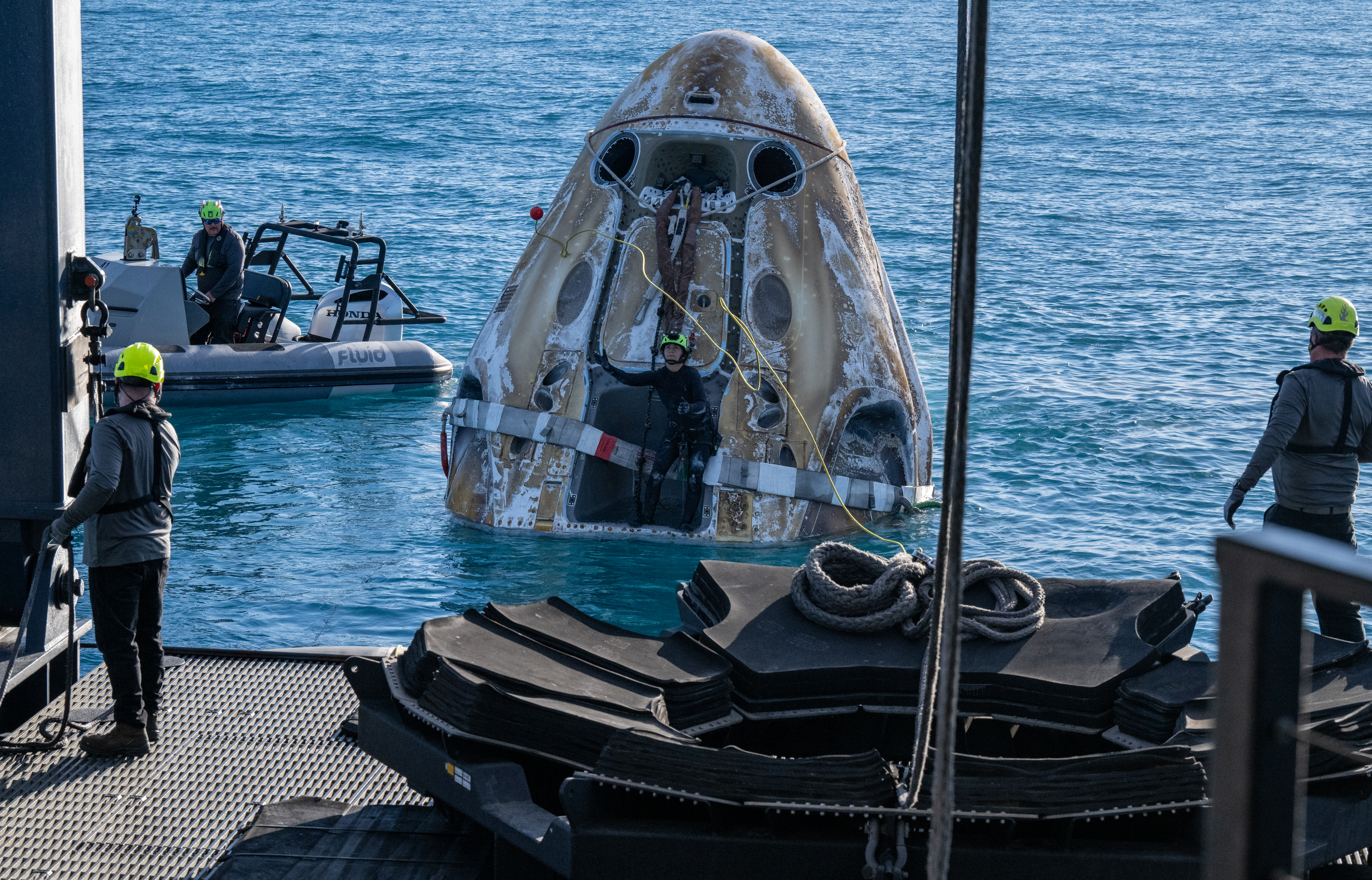
Crew Dragon Freedom is pulled in by MV Megan after splashdown in the Gulf of Mexico

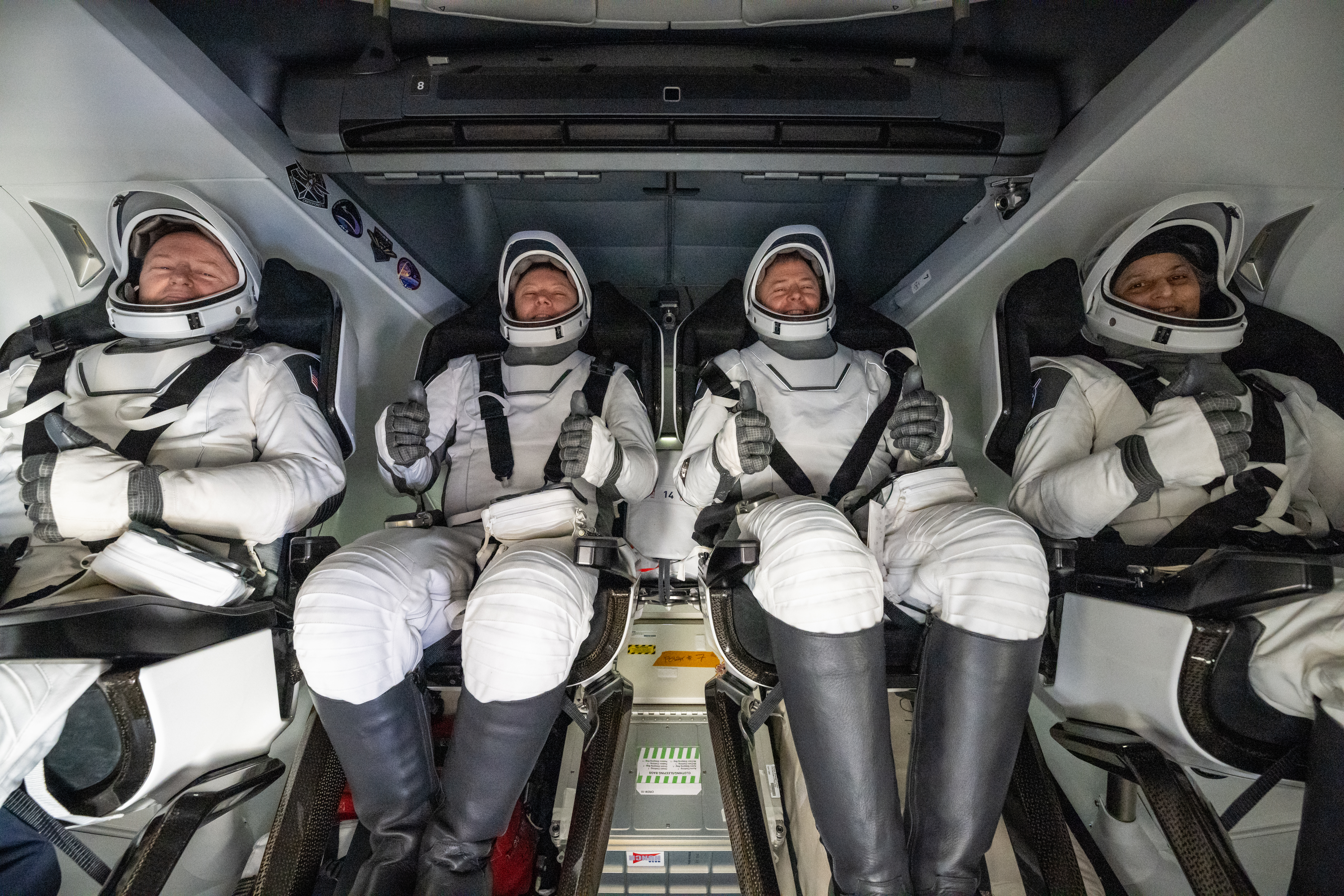
From left, Wilmore, Gorbunov, Hague, and Williams inside Crew Dragon Freedom after splashdown
