= Aleksandr Gorbunov =

Russian cosmonaut and aerospace engineer (born 1990)

- Александр Горбунов
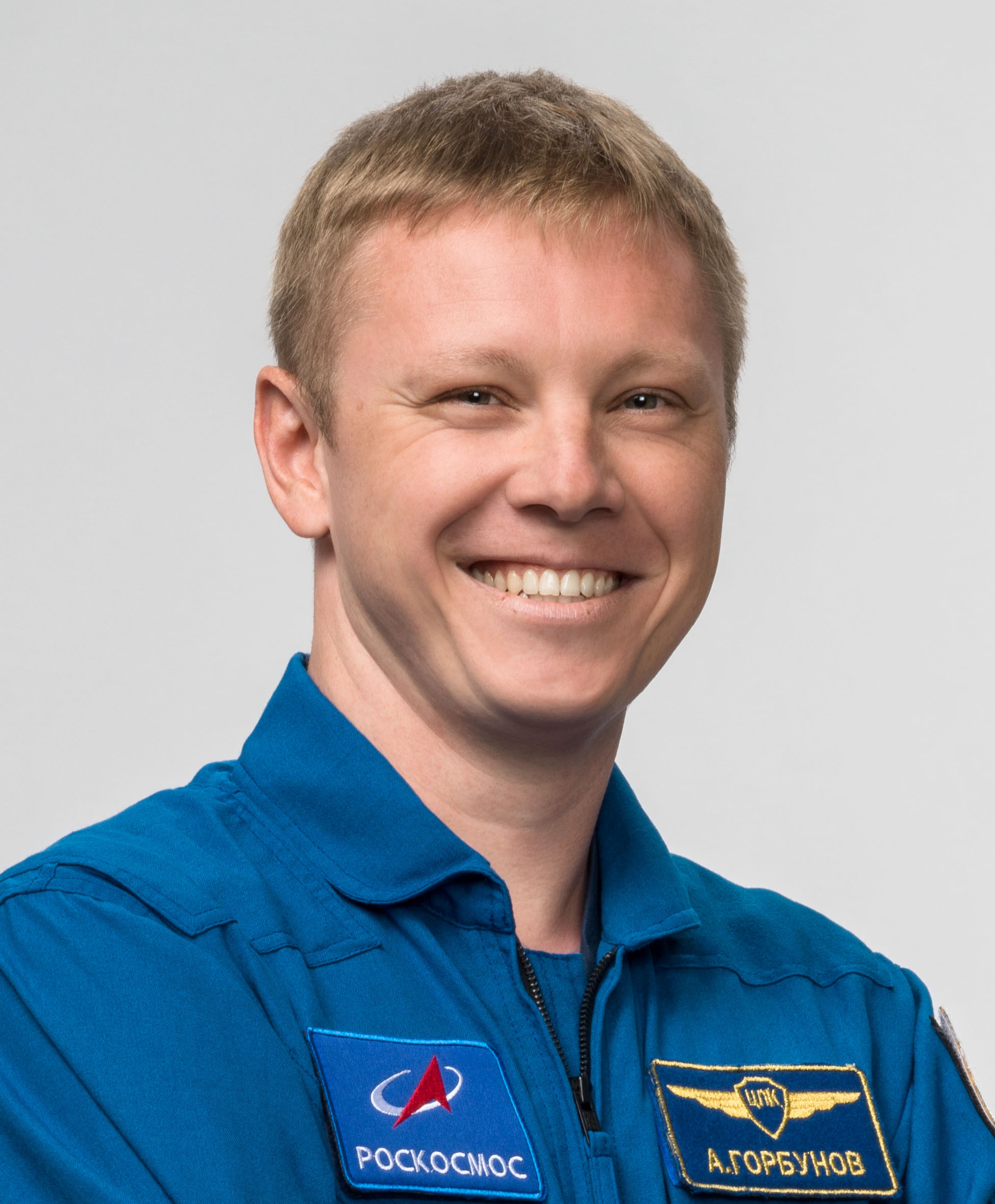
- Gorbunov in 2023
- Born: Aleksandr Vladimirovich Gorbunov; 24 May 1990 (age 36); Zheleznogorsk, Russian SFSR, Soviet Union
- Education: Moscow Aviation Institute
- Space career

Roscosmos cosmonaut
- Current occupation: Test cosmonaut
- Previous occupation: Design engineer for Energia
- Status: Active
- Rank: Lieutenant, Russian Air Force (reserve)
- Time in space: 171 days, 4 hours, 39 minutes
- Selection: 17th Cosmonaut Group (2018)
- Missions: SpaceX Crew-9 (Expedition 72)

Aleksandr Vladimirovich Gorbunov (Russian: Александр Владимирович Горбунов; born 24 May 1990) is a Russian cosmonaut and aerospace engineer. A native of Zheleznogorsk, he graduated with a degree in engineering from the Moscow Aviation Institute.

Gorbunov serves as a lieutenant in the Air Force Reserve of the Russian Aerospace Forces. Before becoming a cosmonaut, he worked as a design engineer at the Energia corporation, contributing to the development and operations of the Progress MS cargo spacecraft.

In 2018, he was selected to join the Roscosmos Cosmonaut Corps. His first spaceflight took place aboard SpaceX Crew-9, which launched in September 2024 and concluded with a splashdown off the coast of Florida in March 2025. During the mission, he served as a flight engineer on the International Space Station as part of Expedition 72.

== Early years, studies and professional activities ==
Gorbunov was born on 24 May 1990 in the city of Zheleznogorsk in the Kursk region of Russia, which at the time was still part of the Soviet Union. Gorbunov said that when he was a young child, he loved the natural world and wanted to be a biologist. He first became interested in aviation when he discovered model planes, and by high school had decided to pursue a future as an aerospace engineer. In 2008, he graduated from Zheleznogorsk secondary school No. 6.

In 2009, he enrolled at the Moscow Aviation Institute (MAI) where until 2012 he studied the "operation and repair of aircraft, helicopters and aircraft engines." In 2014, Gorbunov graduated with honors from the institute with an engineering degree with a specialty qualification in "Spacecraft and Upper Stages."

In October 2012, Gorbunov began working as a technician at Energia, a Russian spacecraft manufacturer. On 31 March 2014 he was promoted to an engineer at Energia. It was during his time, as he was designing spacecraft, that he realized that he also wanted the chance to use them, and after meeting with a few cosmonauts he decided to try and join the cosmonaut corps.

== Training ==
In 2015, Gorbunov successfully passed medical examinations at the Institute of Biomedical Problems. He subsequently applied to join the Roscosmos Cosmonaut Corps in June 2017 and received medical clearance in November of the same year. On 10 August 2018, he was recommended for enrollment as a cosmonaut candidate.

On 1 October 2018, Gorbunov began his general training, and over the next two years, he faced a series of demanding challenges. In February 2019, his cosmonaut candidate class completed winter survival training. In August 2019, the candidates underwent diving training at the Noginsk Rescue Center of the Russian Ministry of Emergency Situations. Gorbunov passed the exam on 30 August 2019 and became a certified diver. His class next traveled to the Port of Sochi on the Black Sea for water survival training in October 2019. Throughout the training, Gorbunov honed his flight skills on the Aero L-39 Albatros aircraft, did parachute jumps and trained in zero gravity conditions reproduced onboard the Ilyushin Il-76 aircraft.

This training culminated on 24 November 2020, when Gorbunov successfully passed the state exam. On 2 December 2020, by decision of the Interdepartmental Qualification Commission, following a meeting at the Yuri Gagarin Cosmonaut Training Center, he was awarded the rank of test cosmonaut.

On 20 January 2022, the Interdepartmental Commission for the Selection of Cosmonauts approved Gorbunov as part of the main crew of Expedition 72.

In May 2023, information appeared on the website of the Yuri Gagarin Cosmonaut Training Center that Gorbunov was being trained as a backup cosmonaut for Alexander Grebenkin, a member of the main crew of the American crewed spacecraft Crew Dragon's SpaceX Crew-8 mission, which is scheduled to be launched to the ISS in early February 2024. Gorbunov was also trained as a flight engineer for the main crew of the Soyuz MS-26 spacecraft and Expedition 72. Later, he was selected for SpaceX Crew-9 mission in January 2024 under the Dragon-Soyuz cross-crew flight system to allow the station to be continuously manned, in case, either of the two crewed vehicles runs into issues.

== Flights ==
=== SpaceX Crew-9/Expedition 72 ===
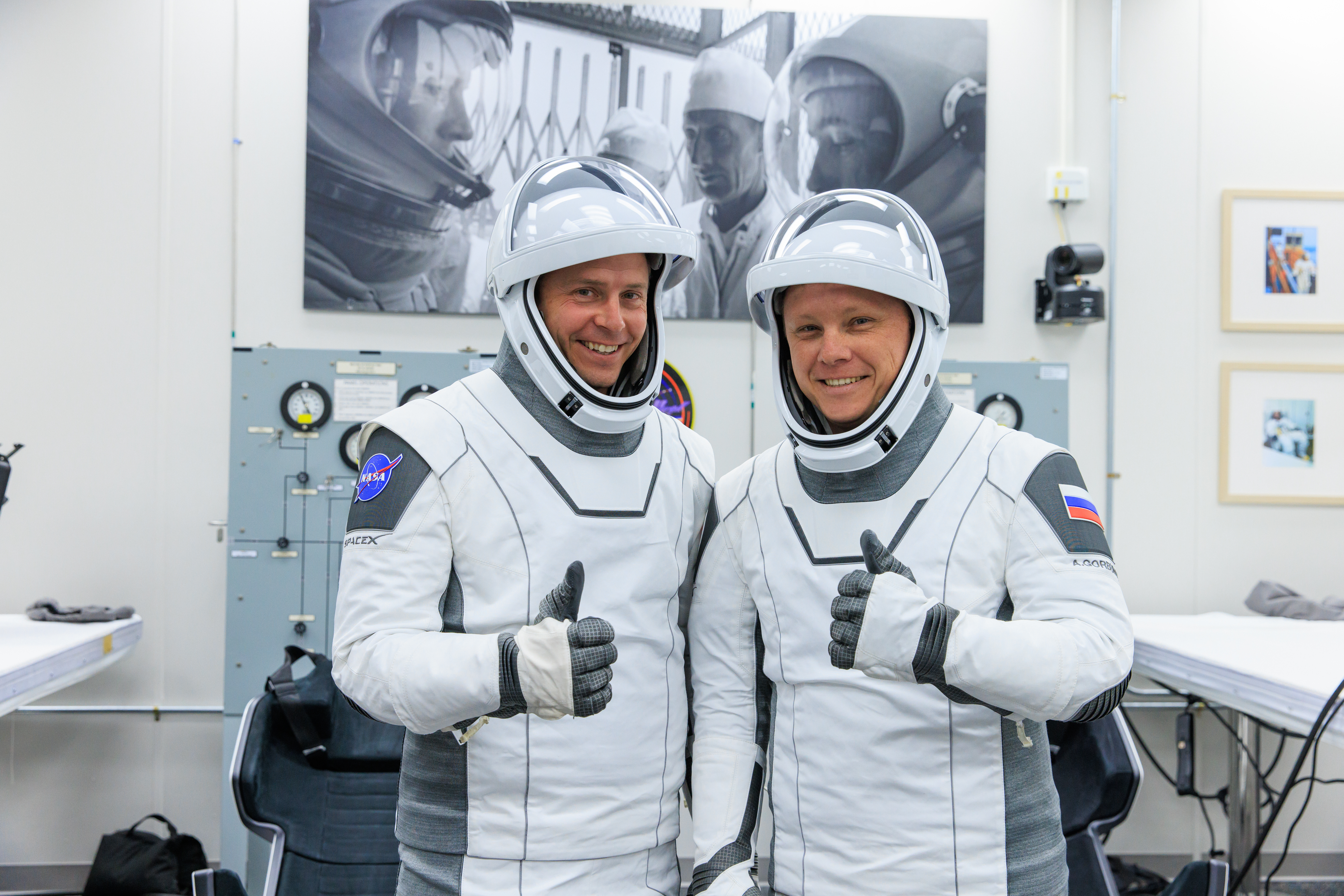
Gorbunov (right) and spacecraft commander Nick Hague (left) suited up before Crew-9

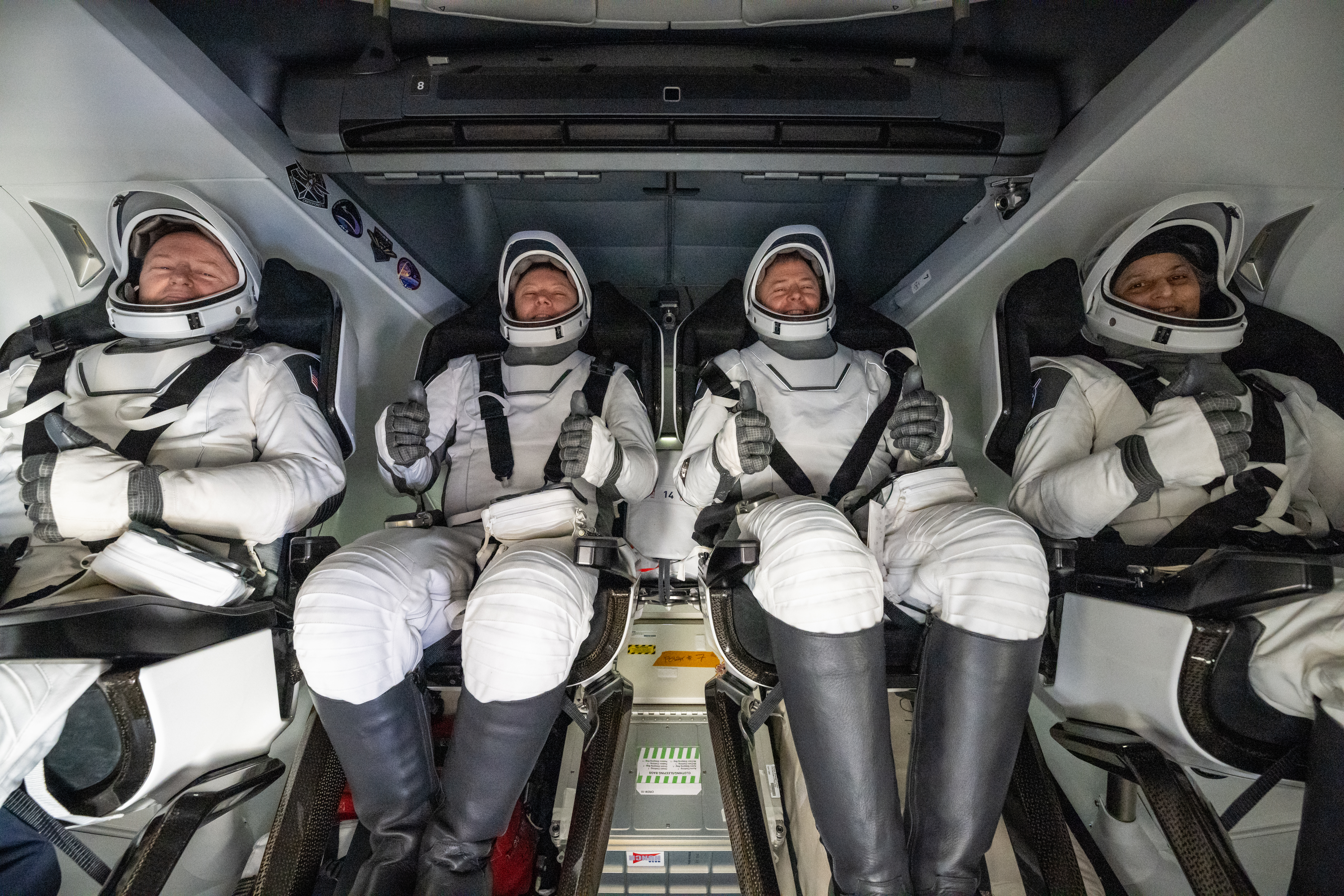
From left: Barry Wilmore, Gorbunov, Hague, and Suni Williams are seen inside the SpaceX Dragon spacecraft after splashdown

Gorbunov made his first flight to space as part of the SpaceX Crew-9 crew and served as a flight engineer on Expedition 72, where he stayed for six months.

The Crew-9 mission was delayed by more than a month due to technical issues with the Boeing Starliner Calypso spacecraft that was docked at the ISS for the Boeing Crew Flight Test. NASA ultimately decided to send the Starliner back to Earth uncrewed, launch Crew-9 with two crew members, and return with four crew members, including the two crew members of the Boeing Crew Flight Test, Barry E. Wilmore and Sunita Williams.

Gorbunov was required to fly as part of the NASA-Roscosmos crew interchange agreement. NASA astronaut Nick Hague, a spaceflight veteran and one of the few individuals to have survived a launch abort aboard Soyuz MS-10, was selected as the commander of the mission.

Following the crew changes, SpaceX, NASA, Hague, and Gorbunov collaborated for three weeks to identify how Hague could assume many of the tasks typically divided between the commander and pilot, and determine which tasks could be assigned to Gorbunov, who would sit in the pilot's seat during launch. While Gorbunov is a qualified engineer and holds the rank of test cosmonaut (making him eligible to be a Soyuz commander), he had only previously received basic training on the Dragon in his role as a mission specialist. Although only serving in a limited capacity, Gorbunov was the first Russian cosmonaut to be at the controls of an American spacecraft.

On 18 March 2025, at 21:57:07 UTC, Gorbunov and the rest of the crew splashed down safely in the capsule off the coast of Florida. The capsule, crew inside, was then recovered by a water recovery team, being placed onto a recovery vessel. The crew were assisted from the capsule and were taken on stretchers for medical checks.

== Personal life ==
Gorbunov says his biggest hobby and interest is paragliding and said that his love of the activity may have inspired his desire to go to space as a way even higher into the skies. He also said that he enjoys hiking and had taken up scuba diving before being required to learn it in cosmonaut training.
