= List of R-7 launches (2010–2014) =

This is a list of launches made by the R-7 Semyorka ICBM, and its derivatives between 2010 and 2014. All launches are orbital satellite launches, unless stated otherwise.

Date and time (UTC)	Configuration	Serial number	Launch site	Result	Payload	Remarks
== 2010 ==
3 February 2010, 03:45	Soyuz-U (11A511U)		LC-1/5, Baikonur	Success	Progress M-04M (36P)	ISS logistics
2 April 2010, 04:04	Soyuz-FG (11A511U-FG)		LC-1/5, Baikonur	Success	Soyuz TMA-18	Crewed flight with three cosmonauts, ISS Expedition 23 / 24
16 April 2010, 15:00	Soyuz-U (11A511U)		LC-16/2, Plesetsk	Success	Kosmos 2462 (Kobal't-M)	Reconnaissance film-return satellite
28 April 2010, 17:15	Soyuz-U (11A511U)		LC-1/5, Baikonur	Success	Progress M-05M	ISS logistics
15 June 2010, 21:35	Soyuz-FG (11A511U-FG)		LC-1/5, Baikonur	Success	Soyuz TMA-19	Crewed flight with three cosmonauts, ISS Expedition 24 / 25
30 June 2010, 15:35	Soyuz-U (11A511U)		LC-1/5, Baikonur	Success	Progress M-06M	ISS logistics
10 September 2010, 10:22	Soyuz-U (11A511U)		LC-31/6, Baikonur	Success	Progress M-07M	ISS logistics
30 September 2010, 17:01	Molniya-M / 2BL (8K78M)		LC-16/2, Plesetsk	Success	Kosmos 2469 (Oko)	Missile defence; Final flight of Molniya-M (8K78M)
7 October 2010, 23:10:57	Soyuz-FG (11A511U-FG)		LC-1/5, Baikonur	Success	Soyuz TMA-01M	Crewed flight with three cosmonauts, ISS Expedition 25 / 26
19 October 2010, 17:10:59	Soyuz-2.1a / Fregat (14A14A)	ST-22	LC-31/6, Baikonur	Success	Globalstar-2 F1 (x6)	Communications satellites
27 October 2010, 15:11:50	Soyuz-U (11A511U)		LC-1/5, Baikonur	Success	Progress M-08M	ISS logistics
2 November 2010, 00:59	Soyuz-2.1a / Fregat (14A14A)		LC-43/4, Plesetsk	Success	Meridian 3	Military Communications satellite
15 December 2010, 19:09	Soyuz-FG (11A511U-FG)		LC-1/5, Baikonur	Success	Soyuz TMA-20	Crewed flight with three cosmonauts, ISS Expedition 26 / 27
== 2011 ==
28 January 2011, 01:31	Soyuz-U (11A511U)		LC-1/5, Baikonur	Success	Progress M-09M	ISS logistics
26 February 2011, 03:07	Soyuz-2.1b / Fregat (14A14B)		LC-43/4, Plesetsk	Success	Kosmos 2471 (GLONASS-K)	Navigation satellite
4 April 2011, 22:18	Soyuz-FG (11A511U-FG)		LC-1/5, Baikonur	Success	Soyuz TMA-21	Crewed flight with three cosmonauts, ISS Expedition 27 / 28
27 April 2011, 13:05	Soyuz-U (11A511U)		LC-1/5, Baikonur	Success	Progress M-10M	ISS logistics
4 May 2011, 17:41	Soyuz-2.1a / Fregat (14A14A)		LC-43/4, Plesetsk	Success	Meridian 4	Military Communications satellite
7 June 2011, 20:12	Soyuz-FG (11A511U-FG)		LC-1/5, Baikonur	Success	Soyuz TMA-02M	Crewed flight with three cosmonauts, ISS Expedition 28 / 29
21 June 2011, 14:38	Soyuz-U (11A511U)		LC-1/5, Baikonur	Success	Progress M-11M	ISS logistics
27 June 2011, 16:00	Soyuz-U (11A511U)		LC-16/2, Plesetsk	Success	Kosmos 2472 (Kobal't-M)	Reconnaissance film-return satellite
13 July 2011, 02:27	Soyuz-2.1a / Fregat (14A14A)	ST-23	LC-31/6, Baikonur	Success	GlobalStar-2 (x6)	Communications satellites
24 August 2011, 13:00	Soyuz-U (11A511U)		LC-1/5, Baikonur	Failure	Progress M-12M	ISS logistics. Third stage engine malfunctioned at T+325 seconds due to turbopump duct blockage.
2 October 2011, 20:15	Soyuz-2.1b / Fregat (14A14B)		LC-43/4, Plesetsk	Success	Kosmos 2474 (GLONASS-M)	Navigation satellite
21 October 2011, 10:30	Soyuz-STB / Fregat (14A14B)	VS-01	ELS, Kourou	Success	Galileo IOV-1/2	Navigation satellites. First Soyuz launch from Kourou.
30 October 2011, 10:11	Soyuz-U (11A511U)		LC-1/5, Baikonur	Success	Progress M-13M	ISS logistics
14 November 2011, 04:14	Soyuz-FG (11A511U-FG)		LC-1/5, Baikonur	Success	Soyuz TMA-22	Crewed flight with three cosmonauts, ISS Expedition 29 / 30
28 November 2011, 08:25	Soyuz-2.1b / Fregat (14A14B)		LC-43/4, Plesetsk	Success	Kosmos 2478 (GLONASS-M)	Navigation satellite
17 December 2011, 02:03	Soyuz-STA / Fregat (14A14A)	VS-02	ELS, Kourou	Success	Pléiades-HR 1 SSOT; ELISA (x4)	Reconnaissance satellites
21 December 2011, 13:16	Soyuz-FG (11A511U-FG)		LC-1/5, Baikonur	Success	Soyuz TMA-03M	Crewed flight with three cosmonauts, ISS Expedition 30 / 31
23 December 2011, 12:08	Soyuz-2.1b / Fregat (14A14B)		LC-43/4, Plesetsk	Failure	Meridian 5	Military Communications satellite. Third stage engine failed at T+412 seconds.
28 December 2011, 17:09	Soyuz-2.1a / Fregat (14A14A)	ST-24	LC-31/6, Baikonur	Success	GlobalStar-2 (x6)	Communication satellites
== 2012 ==
25 January 2012, 23:06:40	Soyuz-U (11A511U)		LC-1/5, Baikonur	Success	Progress M-14M	ISS logistics
20 April 2012, 12:50:24	Soyuz-U (11A511U)		LC-31/6, Baikonur	Success	Progress M-15M	ISS logistics
15 May 2012, 03:01:23	Soyuz-FG (11A511U-FG)		LC-1/5, Baikonur	Success	Soyuz TMA-04M	Crewed flight with three cosmonauts, ISS Expedition 31 / 32
17 May 2012, 14:05:00	Soyuz-U (11A511U)		LC-16/2, Plesetsk	Success	Kosmos 2480 (Kobal't-M)	Reconnaissance film-return satellite
15 July 2012, 02:40:03	Soyuz-FG (11A511U-FG)		LC-1/5, Baikonur	Success	Soyuz TMA-05M	Crewed flight with three cosmonauts, ISS Expedition 32 / 33
22 July 2012, 06:41:39	Soyuz-FG / Fregat (11A511U-FG)		LC-31/6, Baikonur	Success	Kanopus V-1; BelKA-2; Zond-PP; TET-1 exactView 1	Earth observation and technology demonstration satellites
1 August 2012, 19:35:12	Soyuz-U (11A511U)		LC-1/5, Baikonur	Success	Progress M-16M	ISS logistics
17 September 2012, 16:28:40	Soyuz-2.1a / Fregat (14A14A)	ST-25	LC-31/6, Baikonur	Success	MetOp-B	Weather satellite
12 October 2012, 18:15:01	Soyuz-STB / Fregat (14A14B)	VS-03	ELS, Kourou	Success	Galileo IOV-3/4	Navigation satellites
23 October 2012, 10:51:11	Soyuz-FG (11A511U-FG)		LC-31/6, Baikonur	Success	Soyuz TMA-06M	Crewed flight with three cosmonauts, ISS Expedition 33 / 34
31 October 2012, 07:41:18	Soyuz-U (11A511U)		LC-1/5, Baikonur	Success	Progress M-17M	ISS logistics
14 November 2012, 11:42:46	Soyuz-2.1a / Fregat (14A14A)		LC-43/4, Plesetsk	Success	Meridian 6	Military Communications satellite
2 December 2012, 02:02:51	Soyuz-STA / Fregat (14A14A)	VS-04	ELS, Kourou	Success	Pléiades-HR 1B	Reconnaissance satellite
19 December 2012, 12:12:35	Soyuz-FG (11A511U-FG)		LC-1/5, Baikonur	Success	Soyuz TMA-07M	Crewed flight with three cosmonauts, ISS Expedition 34 / 35
== 2013 ==
6 February 2013, 16:04:24	Soyuz-2.1a / Fregat (14A14A)	ST-26	LC-31/6, Baikonur	Success	GlobalStar-2 (x6)	Communication satellites
11 February 2013, 14:41:46	Soyuz-U (11A511U)		LC-1/5, Baikonur	Success	Progress M-18M	ISS logistics
28 March 2013, 20:43:20	Soyuz-FG (11A511U-FG)		LC-1/5, Baikonur	Success	Soyuz TMA-08M	Crewed flight with three cosmonauts, ISS Expedition 35 / 36
19 April 2013, 10:00:00	Soyuz-2.1a (14A14A)		LC-31/6, Baikonur	Success	Bion-M No.1	Recoverable biological science satellite
24 April 2013, 10:12:16	Soyuz-U (11A511U)		LC-1/5, Baikonur	Success	Progress M-19M	ISS logistics
26 April 2013, 05:23:41	Soyuz-2.1b / Fregat (14A14B)		LC-43/4, Plesetsk	Success	Kosmos 2485 (GLONASS-M)	Navigation satellite
28 May 2013, 20:31:24	Soyuz-FG (11A511U-FG)		LC-1/5, Baikonur	Success	Soyuz TMA-09M	Crewed flight with three cosmonauts, ISS Expedition 36 / 37
7 June 2013, 18:37:59	Soyuz-2.1b (14A14B)		LC-43/4, Plesetsk	Success	Kosmos 2486 (Persona)	Reconnaissance satellite
25 June 2013, 17:28:48	Soyuz-2.1b (14A14B)		LC-31/6, Baikonur	Success	Resurs-P No.1	Earth observation satellite
25 June 2013, 19:27:03	Soyuz-STB / Fregat (14A14B)	VS-05	ELS, Kourou	Success	O3b (x4)	Low Earth orbit communication satellites
27 July 2013, 20:45:08	Soyuz-U (11A511U)		LC-31/6, Baikonur	Success	Progress M-20M	ISS logistics
25 September 2013, 20:58:50	Soyuz-FG (11A511U-FG)		LC-1/5, Baikonur	Success	Soyuz TMA-10M	Crewed flight with three cosmonauts, ISS Expedition 37 / 38
7 November 2013, 04:14:15	Soyuz-FG (11A511U-FG)		LC-1/5, Baikonur	Success	Soyuz TMA-11M	Crewed flight with three cosmonauts, ISS Expedition 38 / 39
25 November 2013, 20:53:06	Soyuz-U (11A511U)		LC-31/6, Baikonur	Success	Progress M-21M	ISS logistics
19 December 2013, 09:12:19	Soyuz-STB / Fregat (14A14B)	VS-06	ELS, Kourou	Success	Gaia	Astrometry satellite
28 December 2013, 12:30:00	Soyuz-2-1v / Volga (14A15)		LC-43/4, Plesetsk	Success	AIST-1; SKRL-756 #1/2	Maiden flight of Soyuz-2-1v; Technology and radar calibration satellites
== 2014 ==
5 February 2014, 16:23:32	Soyuz-U (11A511U)		LC-1/5, Baikonur	Success	Progress M-22M	ISS logistics
23 March 2014, 22:54:03	Soyuz-2.1b / Fregat (14A14B)		LC-43/4, Plesetsk	Success	Kosmos 2494 (GLONASS-M)	Navigation satellite
25 March 2014, 21:17:23	Soyuz-FG (11A511U-FG)		LC-1/5, Baikonur	Success	Soyuz TMA-12M	Crewed flight with three cosmonauts, ISS Expedition 39 / 40
3 April 2014, 21:02:26	Soyuz-STA / Fregat (14A14A)	VS-07	ELS, Kourou	Success	Sentinel-1A	Earth observation satellite
9 April 2014, 15:26:27	Soyuz-U (11A511U)		LC-1/5, Baikonur	Success	Progress M-23M	ISS logistics
16 April 2014, 16:20:00	Soyuz-U (11A511U)		LC-31/6, Baikonur	Success	EgyptSat 2	Earth observation satellite
6 May 2014, 13:49:35	Soyuz-2.1a (14A14A)		LC-43/4, Plesetsk	Success	Kosmos 2495 (Kobal't-M)	Reconnaissance film-return satellite
28 May 2014, 19:57:41	Soyuz-FG (11A511U-FG)		LC-1/5, Baikonur	Success	Soyuz TMA-13M	Crewed flight with three cosmonauts, ISS Expedition 40 / 41
14 June 2014, 17:16:48	Soyuz-2.1b / Fregat (14A14B)		LC-43/4, Plesetsk	Success	Kosmos 2500 (GLONASS-M)	Navigation satellite
8 July 2014, 15:58:28	Soyuz-2.1b / Fregat (14A14B)		LC-31/6, Baikonur	Success	Meteor-M No.2; MKA-PN2; DX-1; TechDemoSat-1; UKube-1; SkySat-2; AISSat-2	Meteorology satellite
10 July 2014, 18:55:56	Soyuz-STB / Fregat (14A14B)	VS-08	ELS, Kourou	Success	O3b (x4)	Low Earth orbit communication satellites
18 July 2014, 20:50:00	Soyuz-2.1a (14A14A)		LC-31/6, Baikonur	Success	Foton-M No.4	Recoverable material science satellite
23 July 2014, 21:44:44	Soyuz-U (11A511U)		LC-1/5, Baikonur	Success	Progress M-24M	ISS logistics
22 August 2014, 12:27:11	Soyuz-STB / Fregat (14A14B)	VS-09	ELS, Kourou	Partial failure	Galileo FOC FM1/FM2	Navigation satellites Fregat upper stage hydrazine accidentally frozen up caused 2nd burn attitude control problem and puts satellites in incorrect orbit; satellites operational but with reduced ability
25 September 2014, 20:25:00	Soyuz-FG (11A511U-FG)		LC-1/5, Baikonur	Success	Soyuz TMA-14M	Crewed flight with three cosmonauts, ISS Expedition 41 / 42
29 October 2014, 07:09:43	Soyuz-2.1a (14A14A)		LC-31/6, Baikonur	Success	Progress M-25M	ISS logistics
30 October 2014, 01:42:52	Soyuz-2.1a / Fregat (14A14A)		LC-43/4, Plesetsk	Success	Meridian 7	Military Communications satellite
23 November 2014, 21:01:14	Soyuz-FG (11A511U-FG)		LC-31/6, Baikonur	Success	Soyuz TMA-15M	Crewed flight with three cosmonauts, ISS Expedition 42 / 43
30 November 2014, 21:52:26	Soyuz-2.1b / Fregat (14A14B)		LC-43/4, Plesetsk	Success	Kosmos 2502 (GLONASS-K)	Navigation satellite
18 December 2014, 18:37:00	Soyuz-STB / Fregat (14A14B)	VS-10	ELS, Kourou	Success	O3b (x4)	Low Earth orbit communication satellites
25 December 2014, 03:01:13	Soyuz-2.1b (14A14B)		LC-43/4, Plesetsk	Success	Kosmos 2503 (Lotos-S)	Military reconnaissance satellite
26 December 2014, 18:55:50	Soyuz-2.1b (14A14B)		LC-31/6, Baikonur	Success	Resurs-P No.2	Earth observation satellite
