= Soyuz at the Guiana Space Centre =

Russian-European launch vehicle programme

Coordinates: 5.169°N 52.690°W

Soyuz-ST-A / Soyuz-ST-B
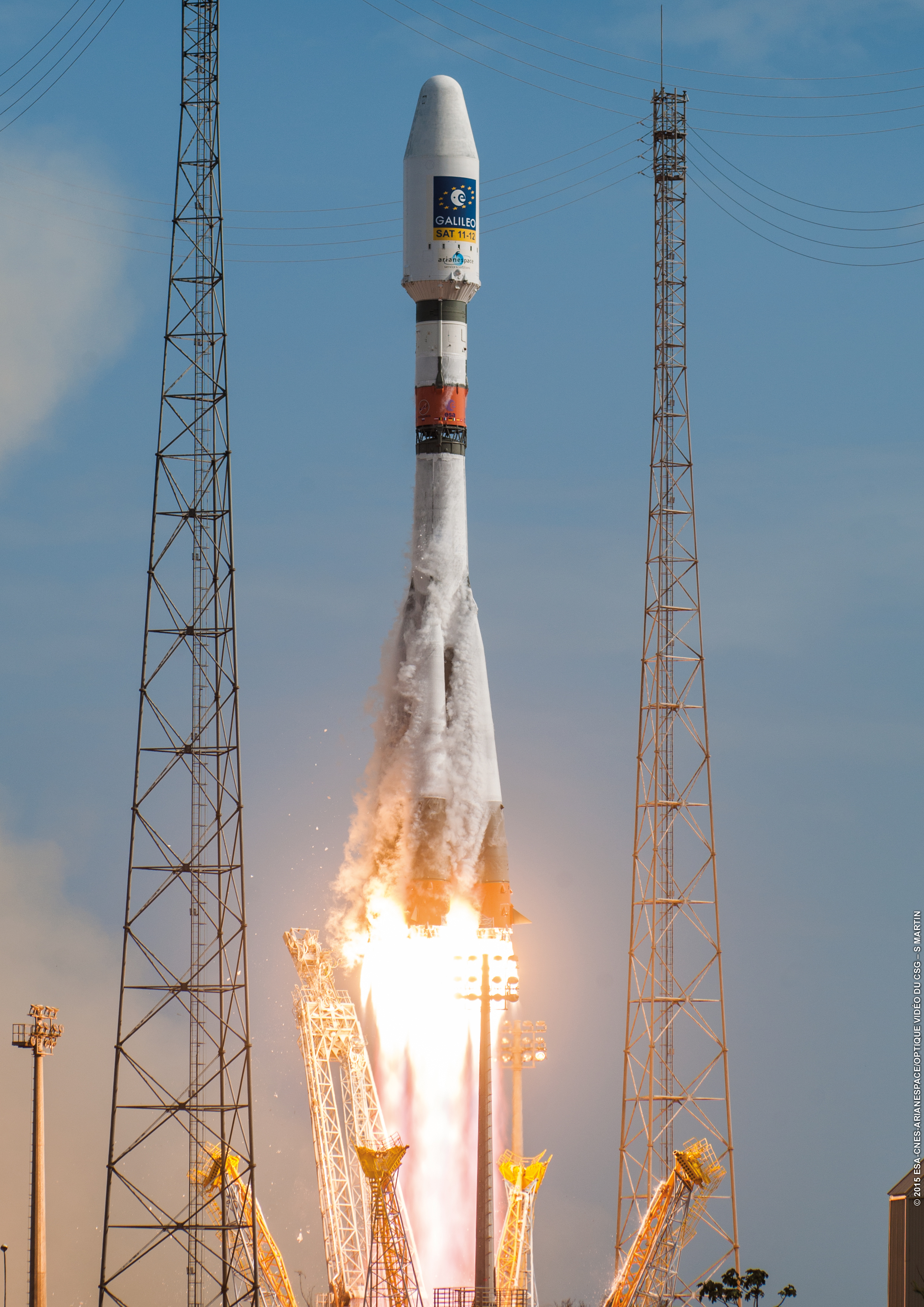
- Soyuz-ST-B launching as VS13 mission in 2015
- Function: Medium-lift launch vehicle
- Manufacturer: RKTs Progress
- Country of origin: Russia
- Cost per launch: US$80 million

Size
- Height: 46.2 m (151 ft 7 in)
- Diameter: 10.3 m (33 ft 10 in)
- Mass: 308,000 kg (679,000 lb)
- Stages: 4

Capacity

Payload to SSO (Note: 820 km (510 mi) SSO with Fregat from Guiana)
- Mass: A: 4,230 kg (9,330 lb); B: 4,900 kg (10,800 lb)

Payload to GTO (Note: 1,500 m/s (4,900 ft/s) Delta-v deficit GTO with Fregat)
- Mass: A: 2,810 kg (6,190 lb); B: 3,250 kg (7,170 lb)

Payload to GSO (Note: with Fregat)
- Mass: B: 1,360 kg (3,000 lb)

Associated rockets
- Family: R-7 (Soyuz)
- Based on: Soyuz-2
- Comparable: Atlas V; Falcon 9; H-IIA; Long March 2F; Long March 8; Zenit-3

Launch history
- Status: Retired
- Launch sites: Guiana, ELS
- Total launches: 27
- Success(es): 26
- Partial failure: 1
- First flight: 21 October 2011
- Last flight: 10 February 2022
- Carries passengers or cargo: CSO; Galileo; O3b; OneWeb; Pléiades

Boosters (First stage) – Block B, V, G & D (Note: This is a transliteration of the second through fifth letters of the Cyrillic alphabet (Б, В, Г, Д). A sense-for-sense translation would correspond to the second through fifth letters of the Latin alphabet, 'Block B, C, D & E'.)
- No. boosters: 4
- Height: 19.6 m (64 ft)
- Diameter: 2.68 m (8 ft 10 in)
- Empty mass: 3,784 kg (8,342 lb)
- Gross mass: 44,413 kg (97,914 lb)
- Propellant mass: 39,160 kg (86,330 lb)
- Powered by: 1 × RD-107A
- Maximum thrust: SL: 839.48 kN (188,720 lb_{f}) vac: 1,019.93 kN (229,290 lb_{f})
- Specific impulse: SL: 263.3 s (2.582 km/s) vac: 320.2 s (3.140 km/s)
- Burn time: 118 seconds
- Propellant: LOX / RG-1

Second stage (core) – Block A
- Height: 27.10 m (88.9 ft)
- Diameter: 2.95 m (9 ft 8 in)
- Empty mass: 6,545 kg (14,429 lb)
- Gross mass: 99,765 kg (219,944 lb)
- Propellant mass: 90,100 kg (198,600 lb)
- Powered by: 1 × RD-108A
- Maximum thrust: SL: 792.41 kN (178,140 lb_{f}) vac: 921.86 kN (207,240 lb_{f})
- Specific impulse: SL: 257.7 s (2.527 km/s) vac: 320.6 s (3.144 km/s)
- Burn time: 286 seconds
- Propellant: LOX / RG-1

Third stage – Block I (Note: This is a transliteration of the tenth letter of the Cyrillic alphabet (И), which also carries the numerical value 10 in Cyrillic numerals. A sense-for-sense translation would use a Roman numeral, 'Block X'.)
- Height: 6.70 m (22.0 ft)
- Diameter: 2.66 m (8 ft 9 in)
- Empty mass: 2,355 kg (5,192 lb)
- Gross mass: 27,755 kg (61,189 lb)
- Propellant mass: 25,400 kg (56,000 lb)
- Powered by: A: 1 × RD-0110; B: 1 × RD-0124
- Maximum thrust: A: 298 kN (67,000 lb_{f}); B: 294.3 kN (66,200 lb_{f})
- Specific impulse: A: 326 s (3.20 km/s); B: 359 s (3.52 km/s)
- Burn time: 270 seconds
- Propellant: LOX / RG-1

Fourth stage – Fregat / Fregat-M / Fregat-MT
- Height: 1.5 m (4 ft 11 in)
- Diameter: Fregat / Fregat-M: 3.35 m (11.0 ft); Fregat-MT: 3.80 m (12.5 ft)
- Empty mass: Fregat: 930 kg (2,050 lb); Fregat-M: 980 kg (2,160 lb); Fregat-MT: 1,050 kg (2,310 lb)
- Propellant mass: Fregat: 5,250 kg (11,570 lb); Fregat-M: 5,600 kg (12,300 lb); Fregat-MT: 7,100 kg (15,700 lb)
- Powered by: 1 × S5.92
- Maximum thrust: 19.85 kN (4,460 lb_{f})
- Specific impulse: 333.2 s (3.268 km/s)
- Burn time: Up to 1,100 seconds (up to 20 starts)
- Propellant: N_{2}O_{4} / UDMH

The Soyuz-ST-A and ST-B were modified versions of the Soyuz-2 rocket, designed to launch from the Guiana Space Centre (CSG) in French Guiana. They were developed as part of a European Space Agency (ESA) programme to add a medium-lift launch vehicle to complement the light-lift Vega and heavy-lift Ariane 5 rockets.

A collaborative effort between Russia and Europe, the project involved constructing the Ensemble de Lancement Soyouz (ELS; lit. 'Soyuz Launch Complex') at the CSG and adapting the Soyuz 2 to the tropical climate. The first launch of a Soyuz ST-B occurred on 21 October 2011, while the first ST-A launch occurred on 17 December 2011.

The Soyuz-ST-A and ST-B were four-stage rockets designed for low Earth orbit missions. Notably, their stage numbering differs from that of some rockets, with the boosters considered the first stage and the central core the second. Unlike the standard Soyuz-2, the Fregat upper stage was mandatory for the ST variants.

Between 2011 and 2022, 27 Soyuz-ST rockets were launched from the CSG, with 26 successful missions. Most of these launches utilized the more powerful ST-B variant, while nine employed the ST-A.

However, the Russian invasion of Ukraine in 2022 created diplomatic tensions between Russia and Europe, ending Soyuz launches from the CSG. Additionally, the introduction of the Vega C and Ariane 6 launchers, both offering medium-lift capabilities, rendered the role of Soyuz largely redundant.

== Soyuz modifications for the Guiana Space Centre ==
To accommodate the conditions and requirements of the CSG, Soyuz rockets underwent several key modifications. These adaptations ensure the vehicle's optimal performance and safety within the tropical environment.

=== Launch Infrastructure and Payload Integration ===
- Mobile Service Tower: Unlike other Soyuz launch complexes, the ELS employed a mobile service tower that enabled vertical payload integration directly on the launchpad.
- European Payload Adapters: Launch vehicles used European-supplied payload adapters, enhancing compatibility with a broader range of spacecraft.
- Engine Ignition: At the ELS, the engines of the boosters and first stage were pyrotechnically ignited. At other Soyuz launch complexes, engines are chemically ignited.

=== Enhanced Safety Systems ===
- European Safeguard Kit (French: Kit de Sauvegarde Européenne): This system can locate the rocket in real-time and, if necessary, transmit a flight termination signal, ensuring the safe destruction of the vehicle in the event of an anomaly.
- Destruct System for Boosters and Core Stage: Boosters and core stage are equipped with pyrotechnic devices to ensure they sink in the ocean for disposal after flight.
- S-Band Telemetry System Adaptation: The S band telemetry system is modified to operate on the Inter-Range Instrumentation Group standard used at the CSG.

=== Environmental Adaptation ===
- Tropical Climate Adaptation: The air conditioning system is adapted to keep the payload cool inside the faring, and protective measures are added to reduce icing when loading cryogenic fluids in the humid environment.
- Pest Control: To avoid potential wildlife intrusions, all cavities and openings within the rocket were studied and certified to be adequately sealed against insects and rodents.

== Vehicle processing ==
Soyuz rockets arrive at the CSG by ship, where components are offloaded and stored for assembly. In preparation for launch, these components are transferred to the temperature-controlled Launch Vehicle Integration (LVI) Building. Here, in a horizontal orientation, the four strap-on boosters are attached to the core stage, followed by the third stage. Several days before launch, a dedicated transporter moves the assembled Soyuz stages from the LVI Building to the launchpad. At the pad, the launch vehicle is erected into a vertical position, and the mobile service tower is moved into place.

Concurrently, within the Payload Processing Facility (PPF) clean room, customer teams prepare their spacecraft. The day before leaving the PPF, the spacecraft is integrated with an adapter/dispenser. This assembly is then transferred to the S3B building, where the fueled Fregat upper stage awaits. Here, the spacecraft and Fregat are integrated and encapsulated within the payload fairing.

Everything comes together on the third day prior to launch when the mobile service tower lifts the encapsulated spacecraft and Fregat upper stage, positioning them atop the Soyuz launch vehicle. Finally, approximately one hour before launch commences, the mobile service tower is meticulously retracted, readying the Soyuz for its mission.

== Launch history ==
=== Inaugural flight ===
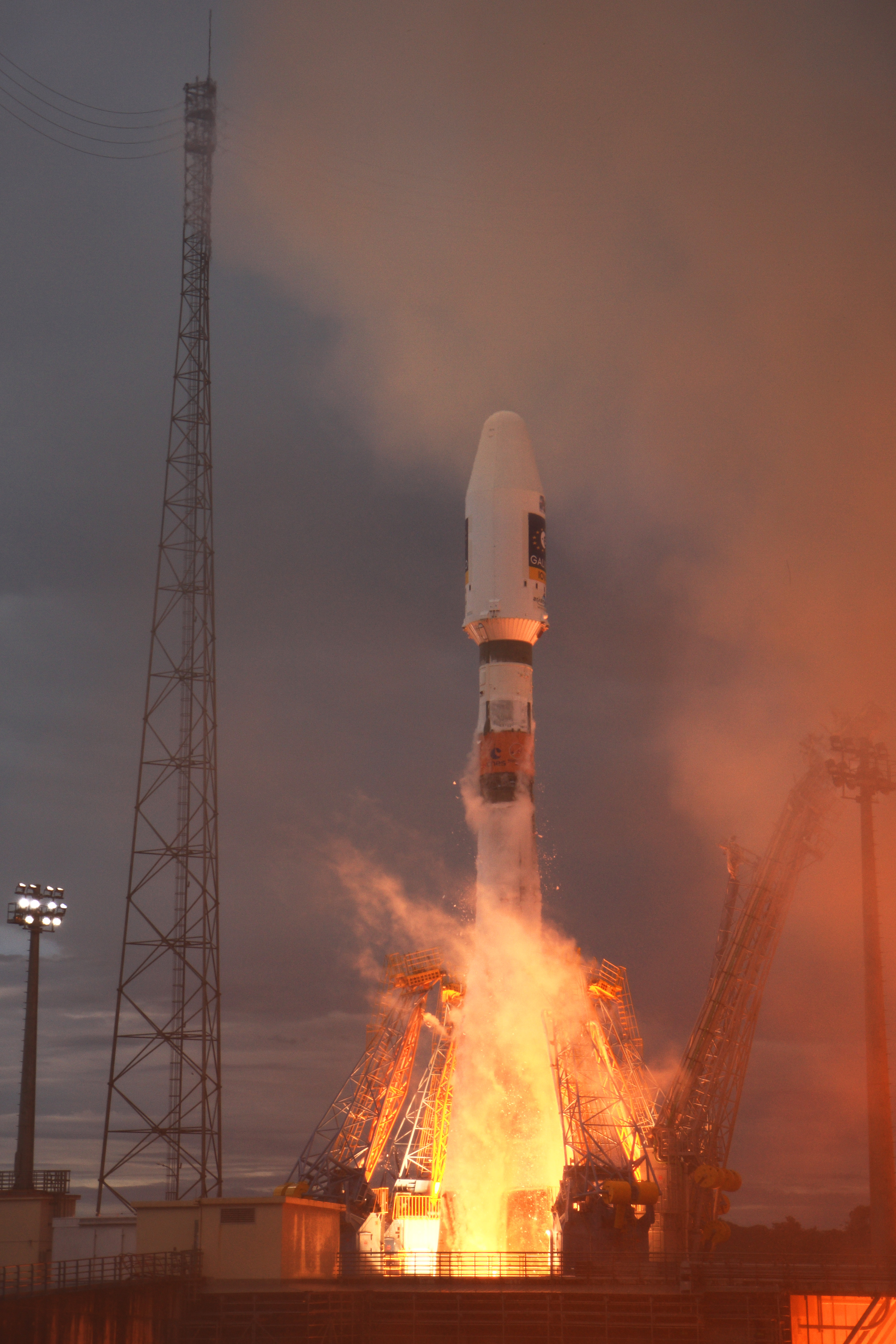
October 2011 inaugural mission.

The first contract for the launch of Soyuz the CSG was signed at the 2009 Paris Air Show by the Director of the Galileo Programme and Navigation-related Activities René Oosterlinck and a CEO of Arianespace Jean-Yves Le Gall. This contract covered 2 launches of two Galileo satellites each. The contract for the satellites themselves had already been signed by ESA and Galileo Industries in 2006.

Launch vehicle components shipped from Saint Petersburg first arrived in French Guiana by ship in November 2009. The Soyuz Launch Site acceptance review took place during the last week of March 2011, leading to the first simulated launch campaign between 29 April and 4 May 2011. The launch site was officially handed over from ESA to the Arianespace on 7 May 2011.

Assembly of the Soyuz ST-B begun on 12 September 2011 in the Assembly and Testing building, while two Galileo satellites underwent final tests after their arrival from Thales Alenia Space facilities in Italy on 7 and 14 September 2011. The launch was planned for 20 October 2011, however an anomaly was detected in the pneumatic system responsible for disconnecting the fuel lines from Soyuz third stage, forcing the mission to be postponed for 24 hours. On 21 October 2011, at 10:30 UTC, Soyuz ST-B took off for its inaugural, 3 hour 49 minute, flight, making it the first time Soyuz was launched outside of the former Soviet Union territory.

=== Flight VS09 ===
On 22 August 2014, Arianespace launched the first two Full Operational Capability satellites for the Galileo satellite navigation constellation into medium Earth orbit. The mission appeared to proceed normally and Arianespace reported the launch to be a success, however analysis of telemetry data provided by ESA and CNES tracking stations showed that the satellites were injected into an incorrect orbit.

	Orbit	Inclination	Eccentricity
Targeted	23,222 × 23,222 km	55.0°	0.00
Achieved	25,900 × 13,713 km	49.8°	0.23

The orbit was determined by the European Space Operations Centre within 3 hours after the separation from launcher, and the satellites were operating normally and under control. Both satellites were switched to safe mode, pointing at the sun while both ESA/CNES and OHB teams investigated the failure and options for the satellites.

On 25 August 2014, Arianespace announced the creation of an independent inquiry commission to investigate the anomaly. On 28 August 2014, details emerged on the events that most likely led to a failure of the Fregat upper stage. At the end of the re-orientation phase the flight control system detected an incorrect angular speed and unsuccessfully attempted to use thrusters to correct the situation. The flight control system did not detect the thruster issue and continued the flight plan with the upper stage oriented in a wrong direction, leaving the satellites in an incorrect orbit.

In late September 2014, the Roscosmos commission report, quoted by Izvestia, indicated that the Fregat failure was due to a design flaw leading to freezing in one of the hydrazine propellant lines, which was placed alongside a line carrying cold helium used for pressurization of the main propellant tanks. During the long first burn required for Galileo orbital insertion the propellant line was cooled to below the freezing point of hydrazine. Further investigations were focused on the software error and a means to prevent similar failures in future. Izvestia also reported that the failure of flight VS09 caused a serious reaction in Russian government. Oleg Ostapenko, head of Roscosmos, had a "difficult conversation in the (Moscow) White House".

On 7 October 2014, the Independent Inquiry Board announced the conclusions of its investigation, revealing that a proximity of helium and hydrazine feed lines resulted in a thermal bridge that caused an interruption of propellant supply to the thrusters. Ambiguities in the design documents allowing this to happen were a result of not taking into account thermal transfers in the thermal analyses of the stage system design. The Board recommended 3 corrective actions: Revamping thermal analysis, correcting design documents and modification of manufacture, assembly, integration and inspection procedures of the supply lines.

In November 2014, ESA announced the satellites would perform a total of 15 orbital maneuvers to raise their perigee to 17,339 km. This would reduce the satellites' exposure to the Van Allen radiation belt, reduce the doppler effect, increase satellite visibility from the ground, and allow the satellites to keep their antennas pointed at Earth during perigee. These orbits would repeat the same ground track every 20 days, allowing synchronization with other Galileo satellites which repeat the same ground track every 10 days. Once in their new orbits the satellites could begin in-orbit testing.

Recovery of the satellites concluded in March 2015, when Galileo-FOC FM2 entered a new orbit, mirrored to the orbit of Galileo-FOC FM1, which concluded its manoeuvres on the end of November 2014 and successfully passed testing. Currently satellites overfly the same location on the ground every 20 days, comparing to 10 days of standard Galileo satellites.

=== List of launches ===
Flight	Launch (UTC)	Configuration	Payload	Payload mass	Orbit	Result	Ref.
VS01	21 October 2011, 10:30:00	Soyuz ST-B / Fregat-M	Galileo IOV-1/2	1,580 kg (3,480 lb)	MEO	Success	
VS02	17 December 2011, 02:03:08	Soyuz ST-A / Fregat-M	Pléiades-1A, SSOT, 4 x ELISA	2,191 kg (4,830 lb)	SSO	Success	
VS03	12 October 2012, 18:15:01	Soyuz ST-B / Fregat-MT	Galileo IOV-3/4	1,580 kg (3,480 lb)	MEO	Success	
VS04	2 December 2012, 02:02:51	Soyuz ST-A / Fregat	Pléiades 1B	1,070 kg (2,360 lb)	SSO	Success	
VS05	25 June 2013, 19:27:03	Soyuz ST-B / Fregat-MT	O3b F1	3,204 kg (7,064 lb)	MEO	Success	
VS06	19 December 2013, 09:12:19	Soyuz ST-B / Fregat-MT	Gaia	2,105 kg (4,641 lb)	L_{2}	Success	
VS07	3 April 2014, 21:02:26	Soyuz ST-A / Fregat-M	Sentinel-1A	2,272 kg (5,009 lb)	SSO	Success	
VS08	10 July 2014, 18:55:56	Soyuz ST-B / Fregat-MT	O3b F2	3,204 kg (7,064 lb)	MEO	Success	
VS09	22 August 2014, 12:27:11	Soyuz ST-B / Fregat-MT	Galileo FOC FM1/FM2	1,607 kg (3,543 lb)	MEO	Partial failure	
VS10	18 December 2014, 18:37:00	Soyuz ST-B / Fregat-MT	O3b F3	3,184 kg (7,020 lb)	MEO	Success	
VS11	27 March 2015, 21:46:18	Soyuz ST-B / Fregat-MT	Galileo FOC FM3/FM4	1,597 kg (3,521 lb)	MEO	Success	
VS12	12 September 2015, 02:08:10	Soyuz ST-B / Fregat-MT	Galileo FOC FM5/FM6	1,601 kg (3,530 lb)	MEO	Success	
VS13	17 December 2015, 11:51:56	Soyuz ST-B / Fregat-MT	Galileo FOC FM8/FM9	1,603 kg (3,534 lb)	MEO	Success	
VS14	25 April 2016, 21:02:13	Soyuz ST-A / Fregat-M	Sentinel-1B, MICROSCOPE	3,099 kg (6,832 lb)	SSO	Success	
VS15	24 May 2016, 08:48:43	Soyuz ST-B / Fregat-MT	Galileo FOC FM10/FM11	1,599 kg (3,525 lb)	MEO	Success	
VS16	28 January 2017, 01:03:34	Soyuz ST-B / Fregat-MT	Hispasat 36W-1	3,200 kg (7,100 lb)	GTO	Success	
VS17	18 May 2017, 11:54:53	Soyuz ST-A / Fregat-M	SES-15	2,302 kg (5,075 lb)	GTO	Success	
VS18	9 March 2018, 14:10:06	Soyuz ST-B / Fregat-MT	O3b F4	3,198 kg (7,050 lb)	MEO	Success	
VS19	7 November 2018, 03:47:27	Soyuz ST-B / Fregat-M	MetOp-C	4,212 kg (9,286 lb)	SSO	Success	
VS20	19 December 2018, 16:37:14	Soyuz ST-A / Fregat-M	CSO-1	3,565 kg (7,859 lb)	SSO	Success	
VS21	27 February 2019, 21:37:00	Soyuz ST-B / Fregat-MT	OneWeb F6	1,945 kg (4,288 lb)	LEO	Success	
VS22	4 April 2019, 17:03:37	Soyuz ST-B / Fregat-MT	O3b F5	3,177 kg (7,004 lb)	MEO	Success	
VS23	18 December 2019, 08:54:20	Soyuz ST-A / Fregat-MT	CHEOPS, COSMO-SkyMed	3,250 kg (7,170 lb)	SSO	Success	
VS24	2 December 2020, 01:33:28	Soyuz ST-A / Fregat-M	FalconEye-2	1,190 kg (2,620 lb)	SSO	Success	
VS25	29 December 2020, 16:42:07	Soyuz ST-A / Fregat-M	CSO-2	3,562 kg (7,853 lb)	SSO	Success	
VS26	5 December 2021, 00:19:20	Soyuz ST-B / Fregat-MT	Galileo FOC FM23/FM24	1,645 kg (3,627 lb)	MEO	Success	
VS27	10 February 2022, 18:09:37	Soyuz ST-B / Fregat-MT	OneWeb F13	5,495 kg (12,114 lb)	LEO	Success	

Flights by Mission Result

Success Failure Partial Failure Cancelled

Soyuz launch statistics from Guiana as of July 2019. Source: data from wikitable Missions, wikitable Scheduled flights and Arianespace website.

=== Launch sequence ===
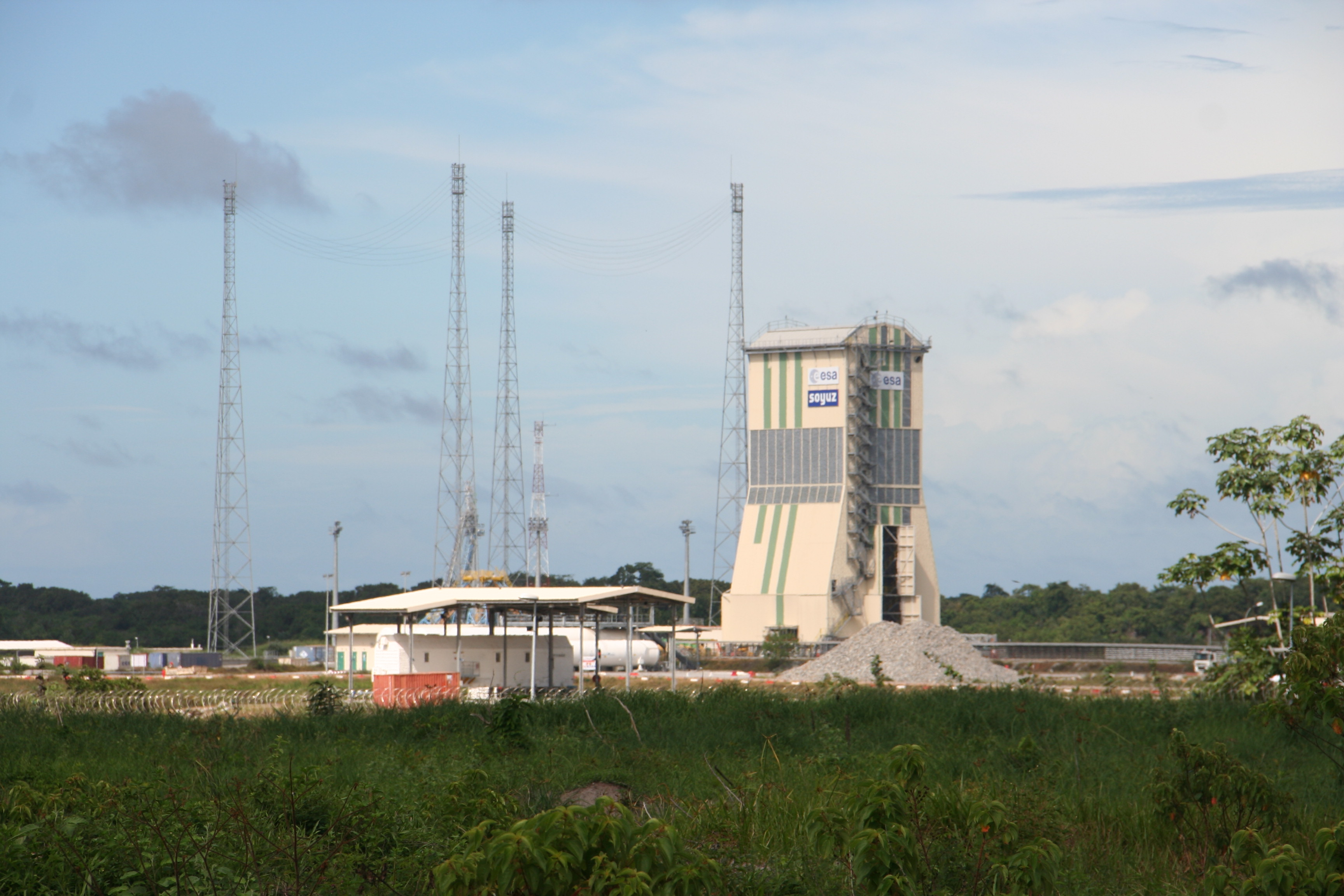
Launch complex with withdrawn mobile gantry

Typically, operations three days before launch include countdown rehearsal for all stages as well as final preparations and verification of the Fregat upper stage. Two days before launch preparations for fueling begin. This is also the last day when pre-launch activity with the payload can occur. The launch sequence is optimized for each mission, the sequence described here is based on flight VS07 which lifted the Sentinel-1A satellite:

Clock	Event	Altitude
T− 06:30:00	Mission control team on console, beginning of a network countdown	
T− 04:50:00	State Commission meeting giving fueling authorization	
T− 04:00:00	Beginning of fueling	
T− 03:00:00	Payload switched to pre-launch mode	
T− 02:20:00	Readiness report	
T− 01:45:00	End of fueling	
T− 01:21:00	Go/no go roll-call	
T− 01:00:00	Mobile gantry withdrawal	
T− 00:10:00	Payload switches to onboard power supply	
T− 00:06:10	Beginning of autosequence	
T− 00:05:00	Fregat switches to onboard power supply	
T− 00:01:00	Activation of automatic launch sequence	
T− 00:00:40	Launcher switches to onboard power supply	
T− 00:00:20	Lower stage umbilical mast withdrawal	
T− 00:00:15	Main engine ignition	
T− 00:00:10	Preliminary thrust level	
T− 00:00:03	Maximum thrust level	
T+ 00:00:00	Liftoff	
T+ 00:01:11	Max Q	
T+ 00:01:58	Boosters separation	60 km (37 mi)
T+ 00:03:29	Fairing separation	120 km (75 mi)
T+ 00:04:47	2nd stage separation	240 km (150 mi)
T+ 00:04:48	2nd stage ignition	
T+ 00:04:53	Aft section separation (connects 1st with 2nd stage)	
T+ 00:08:46	Fregat upper stage separation	
T+ 00:09:46	Fregat ignition	410 km (250 mi)
T+ 00:20:04	Fregat shutdown	
T+ 00:23:29	Payload separation	693 km (431 mi)
