= MUSIS =

International imagery intelligence sharing program

The MUltinational Space-based Imaging System for Surveillance, Reconnaissance and Observation (MUSIS) is an international program including France, Italy, Belgium, Germany, Greece, and Spain, aimed at allowing the six nations to share imagery from various military satellites through a common, generic user ground segment (UGS) according to agreed rules and quota.

== Overview ==
Similar to many category B projects of European Defence Agency (EDA), it is managed by OCCAR.

MUSIS was intended to provide access to a number of missions intended for the 2015 timeframe:

- the successor of French Hélios 2 called Composante Spatiale Optique (CSO)
- the successor of German SAR-Lupe called SARah
- the successor of Italian COSMO-SkyMed called COSMO Second Generation (CSG)
- the Spanish wide area optical satellite SEOSat-Ingenio (formerly known as Seosat)

The two systems mentioned first are entirely military whilst the two latter systems are dual-use.

== History ==
MUSIS was approved in 2006 and studies were launched in order to achieve Initial Operational Capability (IOC) by 2015. MUSIS was supposed to allow mutual access to the - still national - satellite constellations through the generic UGS. The latter would allow the countries involved to share intelligence imagery more easily than is currently possible. After many divisions amongst the nations involved and some calls to cancel the programme, MUSIS has undergone a substantial change.

But effectively, during the meeting on 6 May 2010, the programme was essentially terminated. Now, MUSIS has deteriorated to a financial contribution scheme to the French Composante Spatiale Optique (CSO) which is the successor of the French Helios 2 programme. MUSIS (a.k.a. CSO) provides a co-funding of CSO and in return offers a percentage no higher than 5% of the optical images that CSO will be able to provide. On 1 July 2010, Poland and Sweden decided to join the MUSIS programme. On 17 December 2010, contracts were awarded for the first two MUSIS satellites, which are the Helios 2 successors.

On 17 June 2011, contracts were awarded to Thales España for the optical focal plane arrays for the first two satellites. In October 2011, Sofradir was awarded a contract to provide HgCdTe sensors for the focal planes of the infra-red instruments on those satellites.
