= Kosmos 2480 =

Russian optical reconnaissance satellite

- Mission type: Reconnaissance satellite
- Operator: GRU
- COSPAR ID: 2012-024A
- SATCAT no.: 38335

Start of mission
- Launch date: 17 May 2012, 18:05 UTC
- Rocket: Soyuz-U
- Launch site: Plesetsk 16/2

End of mission
- Landing date: 24 September 2012 UTC

Orbital parameters
- Reference system: Geocentric
- Regime: Low Earth Orbit
- Perigee altitude: 186 kilometres (116 mi)
- Apogee altitude: 255 kilometres (158 mi)
- Inclination: 81.3 degrees
- Period: 88.9 minutes
- Epoch: 17 May 2012

Kosmos 2480 (Russian: Космос 2480 meaning Cosmos 2480) was a Russian Kobalt-M reconnaissance satellite which was launched in 2012 by the Russian Aerospace Defence Forces. It was the last launch of a Soyuz-U rocket launched from Plesetsk Cosmodrome.

Kosmos 2480 was launched from Site 16/2 at Plesetsk Cosmodrome. The last Soyuz-U carrier rocket launched from Plesetsk Cosmodrome was used to perform the launch, which took place at 18:05 UTC on 17 May 2012. The launch successfully placed the satellite into low Earth orbit. It subsequently received its Kosmos designation, and the international designator 2012-024A. The United States Space Command assigned it the Satellite Catalog Number 38335.

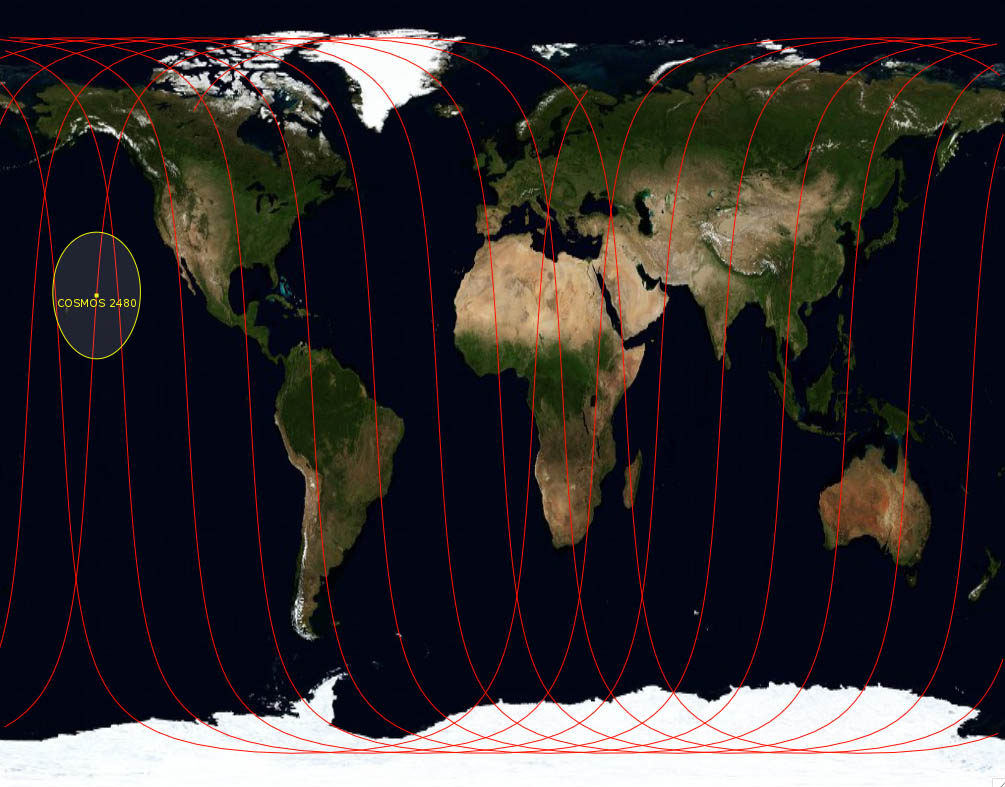
Ground track of Kosmos 2480

== Kobalt-M ==
Kobalt-M satellites are a type of Yantar satellite, Yantar-4K2M. They have the GRAU index 11F695M. They are optical reconnaissance satellites which use film. The satellite sends two film capsules to earth and returns to earth itself at the end of its mission. This has the disadvantage that the satellite's life is dependent on how much film it can carry, and information from the satellite is not obtained until the film canister has returned to earth and been developed.

The satellite returned to Earth on 24 September 2012.

The previous satellite of this class, Kosmos 2472, was launched on 27 June 2011 and returned to Earth on 24 October 2011.

== See also ==
- List of Kosmos satellites (2251–2500)
- List of R-7 launches (2010–2014)
