= Organisation for Joint Armament Cooperation =

European intergovernmental organisation

- Logo of OCCAR

- Organisation full members Participants in some programmes
- Abbreviation: OCCAR-EA
- Formation: January 2001; 25 years ago
- Type: Intergovernmental organisation
- Headquarters: Bonn, Germany
- Location(s): Paris, France Madrid, Spain Seville, France Rome, Italy La Spezia, Italy Munich, Germany Saint Nazaire, France Castellammare di Stabia, Italy
- Members: 6 Member States: Belgium; Germany; Italy; Spain; United Kingdom; France; 14 Non-Member Participating States: Finland; Lithuania; Netherlands Member State in Accession; Poland; Sweden; Turkey; Luxembourg; Norway; Australia; Denmark; Greece; Portugal; Romania; Cyprus; 3 Observer States: Australia; Japan; Brazil
- Director: Joachim Sucker
- Budget: €8.5 Billion
- Staff: ~470(Jan 2026)
- Website: www.occar.int

The Organisation for Joint Armament Cooperation (French: Organisation Conjointe de Coopération en matière d'armement; OCCAR) is a European intergovernmental organisation which facilitates and manages collaborative armament programmes through their lifecycle between the governments of Belgium, France, Germany, Italy, Spain, and the United Kingdom.

== History ==
OCCAR was established on 12 November 1996 by the Defence Ministers of France, Germany, Italy and the United Kingdom. Legal status was not achieved, however, until January 2001 when the parliaments of the four founding states ratified the OCCAR Convention. Other European nations may join OCCAR, subject to their actual involvement in a substantive collaborative equipment programme involving at least one OCCAR partner and ratification of the OCCAR Convention. Belgium and Spain joined the organisation in respectively 2003 and 2005.

Other states can participate to OCCAR programmes without becoming a member state. Currently the European Union member states and/or NATO members Turkey, Netherlands, Luxembourg, Finland, Sweden, Lithuania, Poland, Norway, Denmark, Greece, Portugal, Romania and Cyprus participate in one or more OCCAR programmes without being formal members. Australia also participates in OCCAR as a non-member with a focus on the Boxer, Tiger ARH and MU-90 Impact platforms.

In 2023 Australia became the first non-European country to act as a participating state as part of OCCAR when it signed onto the MU-90 In-service support program. In November 2023 the Netherlands voiced its intention to join OCCAR.In May 2026 the Netherlands has now taken formal steps towards joining as a member state and the legislative proposal was sent to the Dutch House of Representatives by the Dutch Defence Minister Dilan Yeşilgöz-Zegerius and Foreign Affairs Minister Tom Berendsen. This would make the Netherlands the 7th Member state of OCCAR.

== Structure ==
The highest decision-making body within OCCAR as corporate organisation is the Board of Supervisors (BoS). Each OCCAR programmes is supervised by a Programme Board (strategic decisions) and a Programme Committee (operational decisions). The programmes are executed by the OCCAR Executive Administration (OCCAR-EA) in accordance with the decisions of the supervisory bodies. OCCAR-EA is headed by the OCCAR Director (Joachim Sucker since Feb 2023) and consists of a Central Office and the Programme Divisions. OCCAR-EA employs around 470 staff members.

== Current programmes ==
The 20 programmes currently managed by OCCAR are the following:

=== Aircraft ===
- Airbus A400M Atlas turboprop military transport aircraft
- Eurocopter Tiger attack helicopter
- Eurodrone or European Medium Altitude Long Endurance Remotely Piloted Aircraft System (MALE RPAS)
- Multinational Multi-Role Tanker Transport Fleet (MMF)

=== Intelligence and communications ===
- European Secure Software-defined Radio (ESSOR)
- COBRA counter-battery radar system
- Multinational Space-based Imaging System (MUSIS)
- Night Vision Capability - 2021 acquisition of 9,550 units for Belgium and Germany, from a consortium of Hensoldt and Theon Sensors

=== Land Vehicles ===
- Boxer multirole armoured vehicle
- M3Evo Amphibious Rig
- Véhicule Blindé d’Aide à Engagement (VBAE)

=== Missiles/Torpedoes ===
- FSAF & PAAMS surface-to-air anti-missile systems
- Future Tactical Air-to-Surface Missile (Missile Air-Sol Tactique Futur, MAST-F) - under development for French Tiger III by MBDA
- MU90 Impact
- Hypersonic Defence Interceptor Programme (HYDEF)

=== Ships ===
- MMPC multirole patrol corvette
- FREMM Multimission frigates
- Logistic Support Ships - Vulcano-class logistic support ships for Italy and Bâtiment ravitailleur de forces for France
- Maritime Mine Counter Measures (MMCM)
- Thaon di Revel-class offshore patrol vessel (Pattugliatore Polivalente d'Altura, PPA)
- U212 Near Future Submarine

== See also ==
The participation in European defence organisations

- Common Security and Defence Policy
  - Permanent Structured Cooperation
  - European Defence Agency
