= Ensemble de Lancement Soyouz =

Launch complex

Coordinates: 5.301861°N 52.834582°W

Ensemble de Lancement Soyouz Soyuz Launch Complex
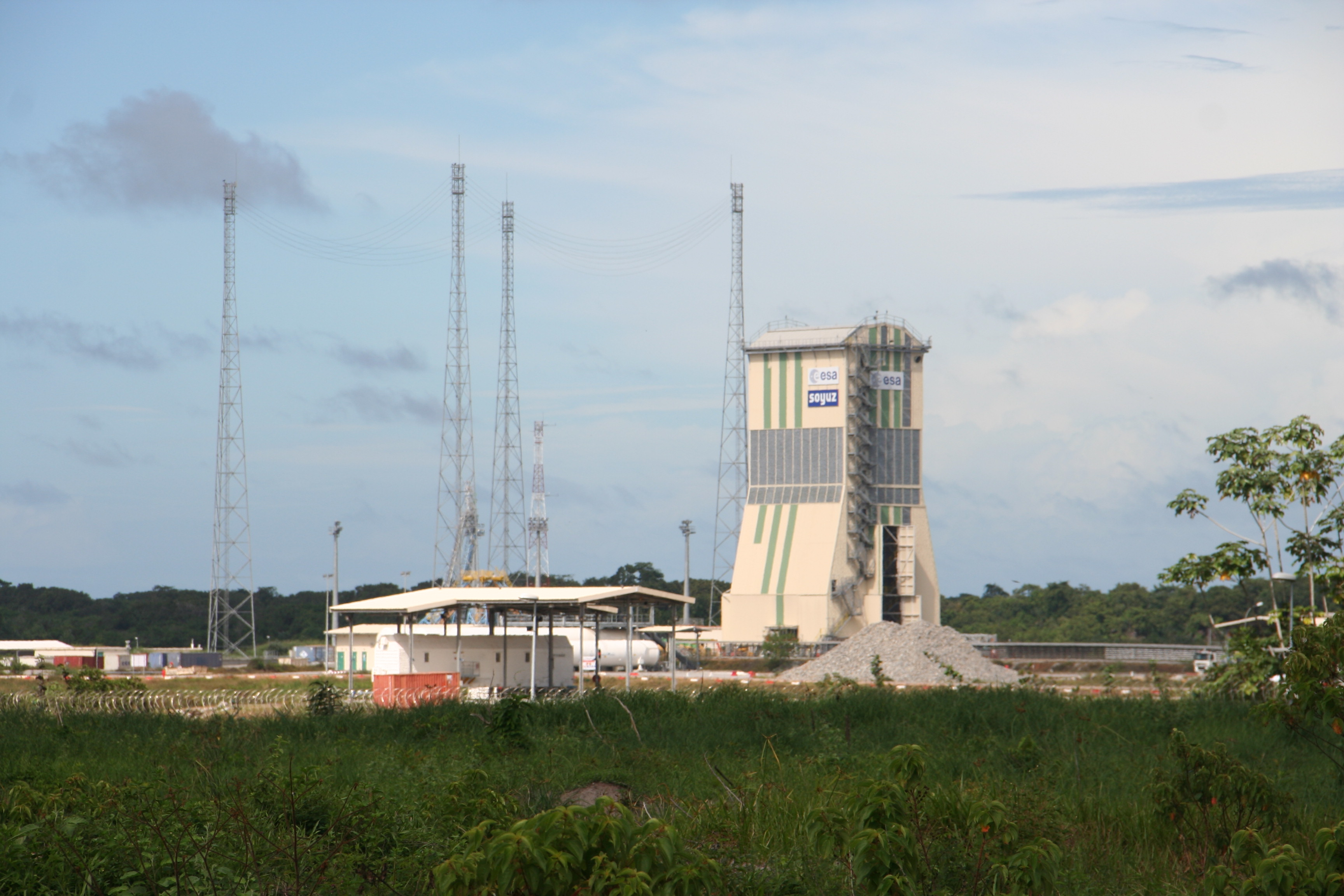
- Interactive map of Ensemble de Lancement Soyouz; Soyuz Launch Complex
- Launch site: Guiana Space Centre
- Time zone: UTC−03 (GFT)
- Short name: ELS
- Operator: Arianespace · ESA
Launch history
- Status: Undergoing renovation
- Launches: 27
- First launch: 21 October 2011; Soyuz-ST-B (Galileo, IOV 1+2)
- Last launch: 10 February 2022; Soyuz-ST-B (OneWeb F13)
- Associated rockets: Future: Maia; Retired: Soyuz-ST-A, Soyuz-ST-B

Launch Sites at the Guiana Space Centre
Active pads
Inactive tenanted pads
Inactive untenanted pads
1 ELFS
2 ELM
3 ELV
4 ELA-2
5 ELA-3
6 ELA-4
7 ELS

Ensemble de Lancement Soyouz (ELS, lit. 'Soyuz Launch Complex') was a launch complex at the Guiana Space Centre in French Guiana. Inactive since 2022 due to the Russo-Ukraine War, the complex was first used in October 2011 in support of the Soyuz-ST rocket and the Soyuz at the Guiana Space Centre programme. It was demolished on April 24, 2026 to make way for a launch pad for MaiaSpace's Maia rocket.

== History ==
The first launch to use the complex occurred on 21 October 2011, when a Soyuz ST-B launched the first two Galileo In Orbit Validation spacecraft.

The site's equatorial latitude allowed a greater payload mass to be delivered into geosynchronous transfer orbit compared to existing Soyuz launch facilities at the Baikonur Cosmodrome in Kazakhstan.

ELS was fifteen kilometres north-west of the launch facilities used by Ariane rockets.

It consisted of a single launch pad, with a horizontal assembly and processing facility, or MIK, located 700 metres away. As with the Soyuz launch complexes at Baikonur and Plesetsk, the pad was connected to the MIK by means of a wide gauge railway, along which the rocket would be transported before erection at the pad.

Unlike other Soyuz launch complexes, the pad featured a mobile service tower, where the payload is integrated when the rocket is in the vertical position; at Baikonur and Plesetsk the payload is horizontally integrated in the MIK before the rocket is moved to the pad. The tower shrouds the rocket during integration, but is moved back to a safe distance (again on rails) prior to launch.

ELS also differed in having a fixed launch mount, rather than one which can be rotated, meaning that the rocket may need to execute a roll manoeuvre during its ascent to orbit. Earlier rockets in the R-7 family were incapable of rolling, so their launch complexes were built to allow launch azimuth to be adjusted before launch.

In 2015 after the quantity of payload orders requiring fuelling at the launch complex S3B site had been identified as a possible bottleneck in flight operations, FCube, a new clean room fuelling facility dedicated to the Fregat upper stage and potentially additional small satellite payloads, was built which would cut fuelling times from five weeks to as little as one.

On 26 February 2022, Roscosmos announced that it was suspending operations at ELS as a reaction to international sanctions following the Russian invasion of Ukraine. According to Stephane Israel, CEO of Arianespace, "there will no longer be Soyuz launches" from the Guiana Space Center.

On 24 April 2026, the old launchpad was demolished to make way for MaiaSpace's facilities on the same site.

== Launch history ==
=== Launch graph ===
- Soyuz-STA
- Soyuz-STB
- Maia

=== Launch chart ===
| No. | Date | Time (UTC) | Launch vehicle | Configuration | Payload | Result | Remarks |
|---|---|---|---|---|---|---|---|
| 1 | 21 October 2011 | 10:30 | Soyuz | Soyuz-STB / Fregat | Galileo IOV-1 | Success | Part of the Galileo satellite navigation system. First Soyuz launch outside of Baikonur or Plesetsk, and first Galileo flight from Korou. |
| 2 | 17 December 2011 | 02:03 | Soyuz | Soyuz-STA / Fregat | Pleiades 1A, SSOT, and ELISA | Success | |
| 3 | 12 October 2012 | 18:15 | Soyuz | Soyuz-STB / Fregat | Galileo IOV-2 | Success | Part of the Galileo satellite navigation system. |
| 4 | 2 December 2012 | 02:02 | Soyuz | Soyuz-STA / Fregat | Pleiades 1B | Success | |
| 5 | 25 June 2013 | 19:27 | Soyuz | Soyuz-STB / Fregat | O3b F1 | Success | |
| 6 | 19 December 2013 | 09:12 | Soyuz | Soyuz-STB / Fregat | Gaia | Success | Part of the Horizon 2000 Plus programme, a space telescope designed to take an all-sky astrometry survey of stars and exoplanets. Only Kourou Soyuz launch into heliocentric orbit. |
| 7 | 3 April 2014 | 21:02 | Soyuz | Soyuz-STA / Fregat | Sentinel-1A | Success | Maiden flight of the Copernicus Programme series of earth observation satellites. |
| 8 | 10 July 2014 | 18:55 | Soyuz | Soyuz-STB / Fregat | O3b F2 | Success | |
| 9 | 22 August 2014 | 12:27 | Soyuz | Soyuz-STB / Fregat | Galileo FOC-1 | Partial failure | Part of the Galileo satellite navigation system. Issues with the Fregat upper stage led to satellites being placed in incorrect orbit. |
| 10 | 18 December 2014 | 18:37 | Soyuz | Soyuz-STB / Fregat | O3b F3 | Success | |
| 11 | 27 March 2015 | 21:46 | Soyuz | Soyuz-STB / Fregat | Galileo FOC-2 | Success | Part of the Galileo satellite navigation system. |
| 12 | 11 September 2015 | 02:08 | Soyuz | Soyuz-STB / Fregat | Galileo FOC-3 | Success | Part of the Galileo satellite navigation system. |
| 13 | 17 December 2015 | 11:51 | Soyuz | Soyuz-STB / Fregat | Galileo FOC-4 | Success | Part of the Galileo satellite navigation system. |
| 14 | 25 April 2016 | 21:02 | Soyuz | Soyuz-STA / Fregat | Sentinel-1B | Success | Part of the Copernicus Programme series of earth observation satellites. |
| 15 | 24 May 2016 | 08:48 | Soyuz | Soyuz-STB / Fregat | Galileo FOC-5 | Success | Part of the Galileo satellite navigation system. |
| 16 | 28 January 2017 | 01:03 | Soyuz | Soyuz-STB / Fregat | Hispasat 36W-1 | Success | |
| 17 | 18 May 2017 | 11:55 | Soyuz | Soyuz-STA / Fregat | SES 15 | Success | |
| 18 | 9 March 2018 | 17:10 | Soyuz | Soyuz-STB / Fregat-MT | O3b F4 | Success | |
| 19 | 7 November 2018 | 3:47 | Soyuz | Soyuz-STB / Fregat-M | MetOp-C | Success | |
| 20 | 19 December 2018 | 16:37 | Soyuz | Soyuz-STA / Fregat-M | CSO-1 | Success | |
| 21 | 27 February 2019 | 21:37 | Soyuz | Soyuz-STB / Fregat-M | OneWeb F6 | Success | |
| 22 | 4 April 2019 | 17:03 | Soyuz | Soyuz-STB / Fregat-M | O3b F5 | Success | |
| 23 | 18 December 2019 | 05:54 | Soyuz | Soyuz-STB / Fregat-M | CHEOPS and COSMO-SkyMed | Success | CHEOPS part of the Cosmic Vision programme, a space telescope designed to determine the size of exoplanets. |
| 24 | 02 December 2020 | 01:33 | Soyuz | Soyuz-STA / Fregat-M | FalconEye-2 | Success | |
| 25 | 29 December 2020 | 16:42 | Soyuz | Soyuz-STA / Fregat-M | CSO-2 | Success | |
| 26 | 5 December 2021 | 00:19 | Soyuz | Soyuz-STB / Fregat-MT | Galileo FOC-9 | Success | Part of the Galileo satellite navigation system. |
| 27 | 10 February 2022 | 18:09 | Soyuz | Soyuz-STB / Fregat-MT | OneWeb F13 | Success | Final Soyuz launch from Korou, with all non-ISS relations between ESA and Roscosmos getting cut due to the Russian Invasion of Ukraine. |

== Gallery ==
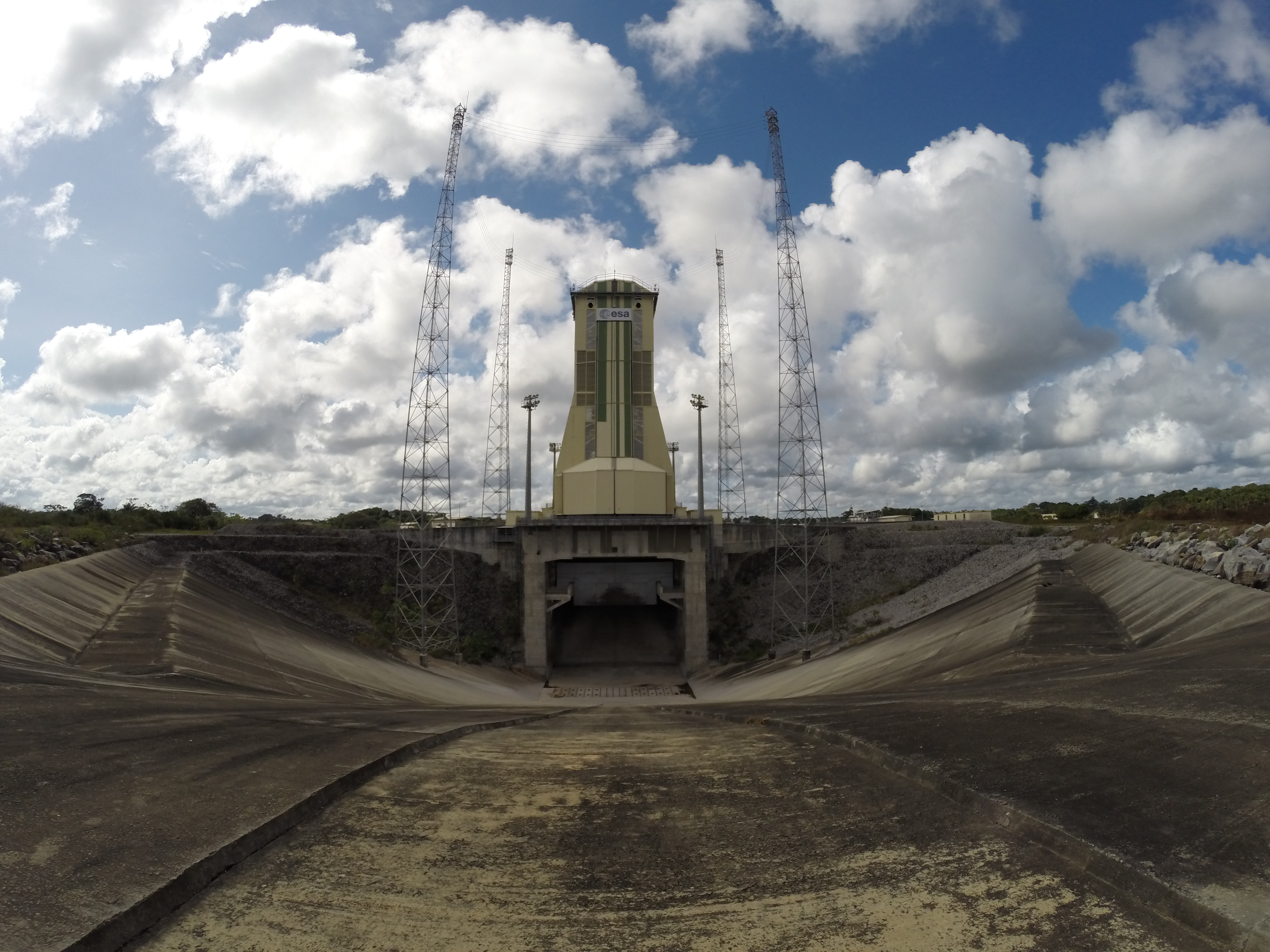
Flame pit with a mobile gantry

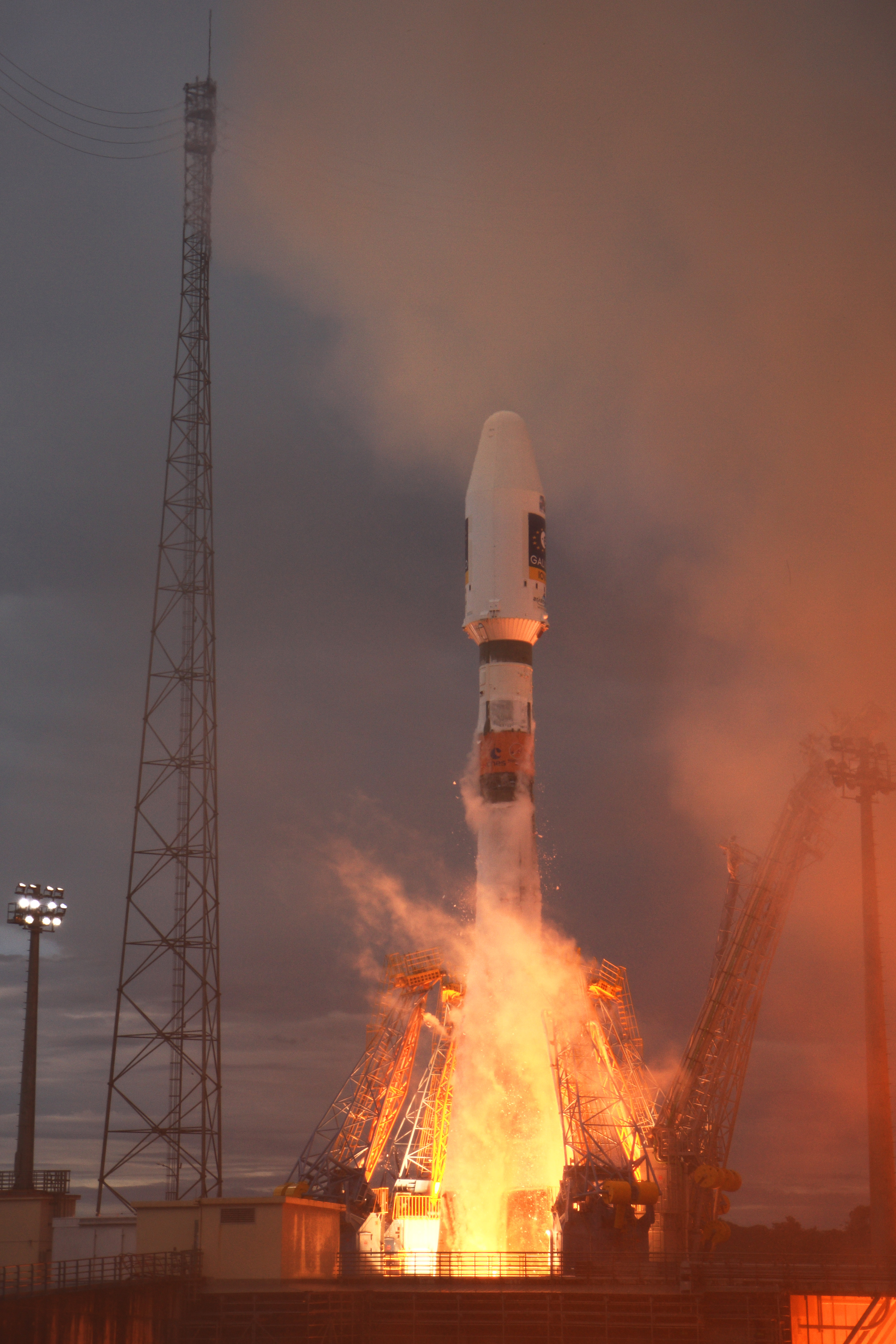
Soyuz launch – a moment of support arms release. Lightning safety tower visible on a left.

Map showing the Soyuz Complex at the upper left, with the main spaceport to the lower right.

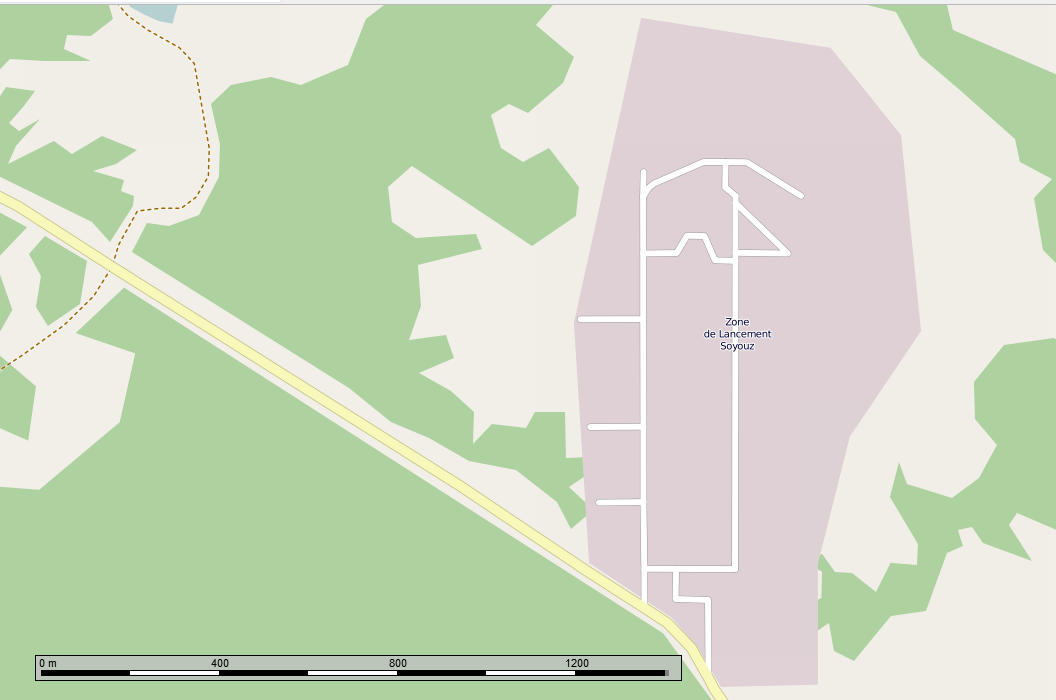
Map of the complex.
