= List of Galileo satellites =

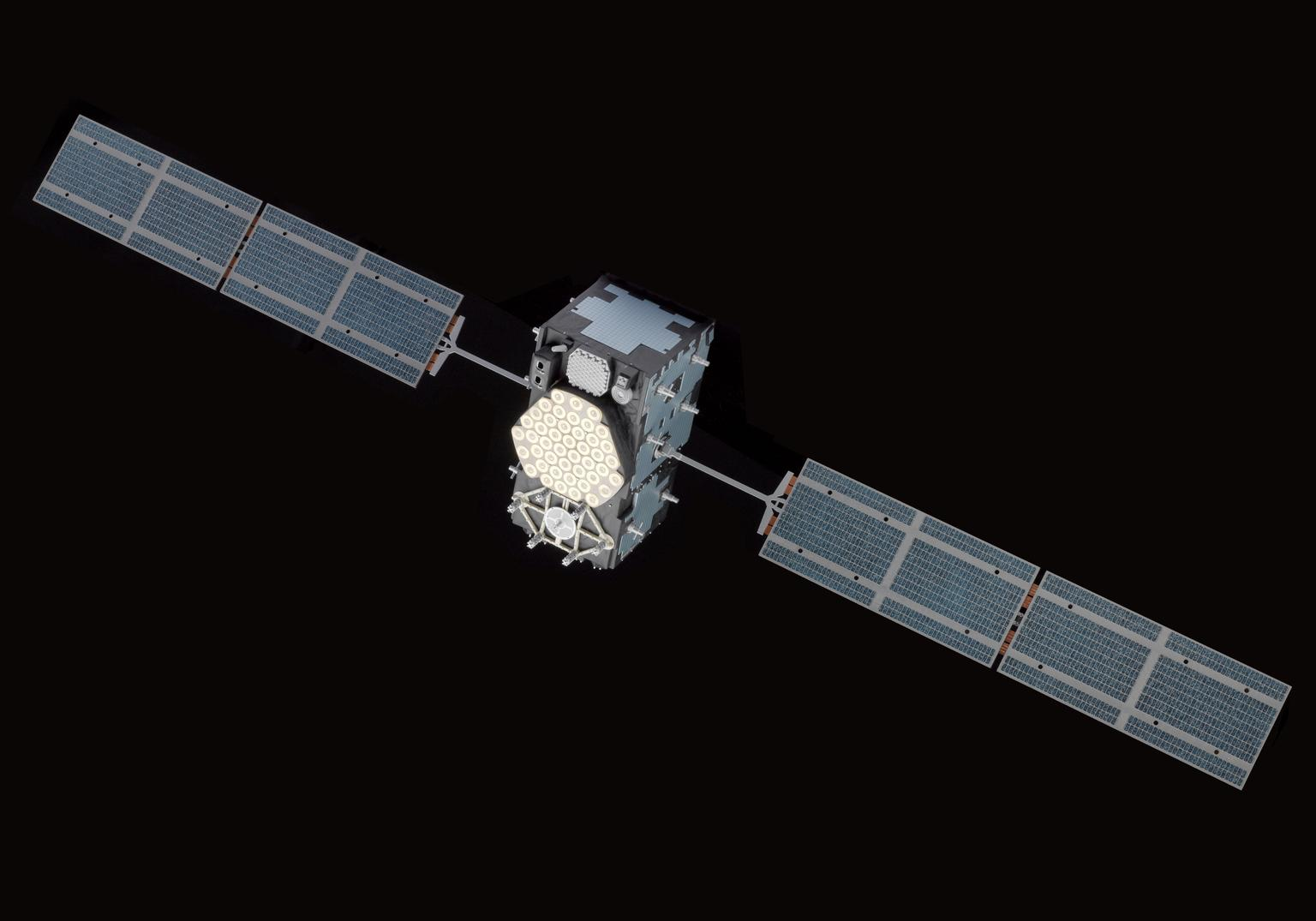
Model of a Galileo IOV satellite

This is a list of past and present satellites of the Galileo navigation system. The fully operational constellation will nominally consist of 30 satellites in Medium Earth Orbit, with 24 active and 6 spares equally divided into 3 orbital planes in a Walker 24/3/1 configuration.

As of 31 August 2026, 34 Galileo satellites have been launched, consisting of 4 In Orbit Validation (IOV) and 30 Full Operational Capability (FOC) satellites. Two separate Galileo In-Orbit Validation Element (GIOVE) prototype vehicles were retired in 2012. Currently, 28 satellites are operational, 4 are not usable, and 2 are decommissioned.

The remaining 4 FOC satellites have completed manufacturing and testing. They are currently in storage awaiting launch by Ariane 6.

FOC satellites were awarded and built in three batches by OHB in Bremen, Germany, with the contribution of Surrey Satellite Technology (SSTL) in Guildford, United Kingdom.

1. Batch 1 consists of 14 FOC satellites (Galileo-FOC FM1 to Galileo-FOC FM14)
2. Batch 2 consists of 8 FOC satellites (Galileo-FOC FM15 to Galileo-FOC FM22)
3. Batch 3 consists of 12 FOC satellites (Galileo-FOC FM23 to Galileo-FOC FM34)

In parallel to Batch 3's completion, 12 Galileo Second Generation (G2G) satellites, featuring electric propulsion, enhanced navigation signals and capabilities, inter-satellite links and reconfigurability in space, were in development by Thales Alenia Space (TAS) and Airbus Defence and Space, with their deployment expected to begin in 2027.

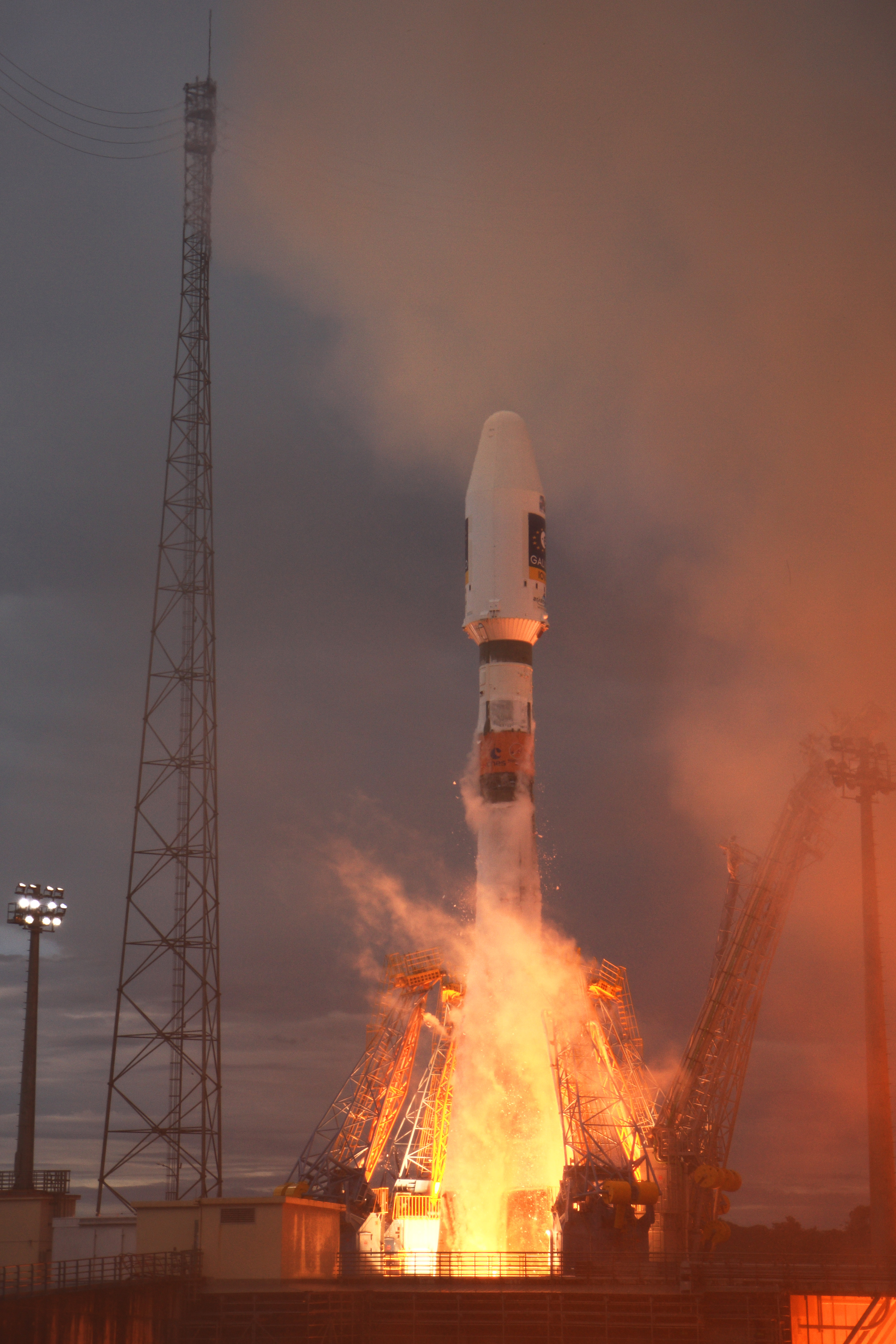
VS-01 launching the GSAT0101 and GSAT0102 IOV satellites on 21 October 2011

== Summary table ==
Summary of satellites, as of October 2026
Block	Launches		Status		
Block	Success	Failure	Operational	Not usable	Retired
IOV	4	0	3	0	1
FOC	28	2 (Note: Deployed into wrong orbit, never used operationally)	25	4	1
G2G	0	0	0	0	0
Total	32	2	28	4	2

== Satellites ==
The initial 28 satellites were each named after a child that won the European Commission's Galileo drawing competition. One winner was selected from each member state of the European Union.

Refer to Galileo Constellation Information for the most up-to-date information on the constellation status.

#	Satellite	Name (nickname)	Launch #, date (UTC)	Launch site	Launch vehicle	Flight name	PRN	Orb. slot	Clock type	FOC block	Status	Remarks
–	GIOVE-A	GSAT0001	28 December 2005; 05:19	Baikonur, Site 31/6	Soyuz-FG/ Fregat	P15000-015	Test	Test	RAFS	–	Retired; 30 June 2012	Technology demonstration. Developed with the main goal of claiming the frequencies allocated by the International Telecommunication Union (ITU).
–	GIOVE-B	GSAT0002	26 April 2008; 22:16	Baikonur, Site 31/6	Soyuz-FG/ Fregat	P15000-016	Test	Test	PHM	–	Retired; 23 July 2012	Similar goal to GIOVE-A, but with higher fidelity signals.
1	Galileo-IOV FM1	GSAT0101 (Belgium) (Thijs)	L1; 21 October 2011; 10:30	Guiana, ELS	Soyuz ST-B/ Fregat-MT	VS-01	E11	B05	RAFS	–	Operational	IOV (In Orbit Validation) vehicles. Initially used for signal validation. Healthy spacecraft are still part of the operative fleet.
2	Galileo-IOV FM2	GSAT0102 (Bulgaria) (Natalia)	L1; 21 October 2011; 10:30	Guiana, ELS	Soyuz ST-B/ Fregat-MT	VS-01	E12	B06	RAFS	–	Operational	IOV (In Orbit Validation) vehicles. Initially used for signal validation. Healthy spacecraft are still part of the operative fleet.
3	Galileo-IOV FM3	GSAT0103 (Czech Republic) (David)	L2; 12 October 2012; 18:15	Guiana, ELS	Soyuz ST-B/ Fregat-MT	VS-03	E19	C04	RAFS	–	Operational	IOV (In Orbit Validation) vehicles. Initially used for signal validation. Healthy spacecraft are still part of the operative fleet.
4	Galileo-IOV FM4	GSAT0104 (Denmark) (Sif)	L2; 12 October 2012; 18:15	Guiana, ELS	Soyuz ST-B/ Fregat-MT	VS-03	E20	C14	RAFS	–	Retired; 18 March 2024	Payload power problem beginning on 27 May 2014 led to permanent loss of E5 and E6 transmissions. Decommissioned 16 April 2025.
5	Galileo-FOC FM1	GSAT0201 (Germany) (Doresa)	L3; 22 August 2014; 12:27	Guiana, ELS	Soyuz ST-B/ Fregat-MT	VS-09	E18	Ext01	PHM	1	Not usable	Launched into an incorrect orbit, later corrected. Began broadcasting tests on 5 August 2016. Unavailable since 18 February 2021 due to receiver compatibility issues.
6	Galileo-FOC FM2	GSAT0202 (Estonia) (Milena)	L3; 22 August 2014; 12:27	Guiana, ELS	Soyuz ST-B/ Fregat-MT	VS-09	E14	Ext02	PHM	1	Not usable	Launched into an incorrect orbit, later corrected. Began broadcasting tests on 5 August 2016. Unavailable since 18 February 2021 due to receiver compatibility issues.
7	Galileo-FOC FM3	GSAT0203 (Republic of Ireland) (Adam)	L4; 27 March 2015; 21:46	Guiana, ELS	Soyuz ST-B/ Fregat-MT	VS-11	E26	B08	PHM	1	Operational	
8	Galileo-FOC FM4	GSAT0204 (Greece) (Anastasia)	L4; 27 March 2015; 21:46	Guiana, ELS	Soyuz ST-B/ Fregat-MT	VS-11	E22	B14	RAFS	1	Not usable	Removed from active service on 8 December 2017 until further notice for constellation management purposes.
9	Galileo-FOC FM5	GSAT0205 (Spain) (Alba)	L5; 11 September 2015; 02:08	Guiana, ELS	Soyuz ST-B/ Fregat-MT	VS-12	E24	?	PHM	1	Retired; 15 December 2025	Decommissioned 15 December 2025.
10	Galileo-FOC FM6	GSAT0206 (France) (Oriana)	L5; 11 September 2015; 02:08	Guiana, ELS	Soyuz ST-B/ Fregat-MT	VS-12	E30	A05	PHM	1	Operational	
11	Galileo-FOC FM8	GSAT0208 (Cyprus) (Andriana)	L6; 17 December 2015; 11:51	Guiana, ELS	Soyuz ST-B/ Fregat-MT	VS-13	E08	C07	PHM	1	Operational	
12	Galileo-FOC FM9	GSAT0209 (Latvia) (Liene)	L6; 17 December 2015; 11:51	Guiana, ELS	Soyuz ST-B/ Fregat-MT	VS-13	E09	C02	PHM	1	Operational	
13	Galileo-FOC FM10	GSAT0210 (Lithuania) (Danielė)	L7; 24 May 2016; 08:48	Guiana, ELS	Soyuz ST-B/ Fregat-MT	VS-15	E01	A12	RAFS	1	Not usable	Unavailable since 30 April 2023.
14	Galileo-FOC FM11	GSAT0211 (Luxembourg) (Alizée)	L7; 24 May 2016; 08:48	Guiana, ELS	Soyuz ST-B/ Fregat-MT	VS-15	E02	A06	PHM	1	Operational	
15	Galileo-FOC FM7	GSAT0207 (Italy) (Antonianna)	L8; 17 November 2016; 13:06	Guiana, ELA-3	Ariane 5 ES	VA-233	E07	C06	PHM	1	Operational	Launched on new dispenser, deployed four satellites at once.
16	Galileo-FOC FM12	GSAT0212 (Hungary) (Lisa)	L8; 17 November 2016; 13:06	Guiana, ELA-3	Ariane 5 ES	VA-233	E03	C08	PHM	1	Operational	Launched on new dispenser, deployed four satellites at once.
17	Galileo-FOC FM13	GSAT0213 (Malta) (Kimberley)	L8; 17 November 2016; 13:06	Guiana, ELA-3	Ariane 5 ES	VA-233	E04	C03	PHM	1	Operational	Launched on new dispenser, deployed four satellites at once.
18	Galileo-FOC FM14	GSAT0214 (Netherlands) (Tijmen)	L8; 17 November 2016; 13:06	Guiana, ELA-3	Ariane 5 ES	VA-233	E05	C01	PHM	1	Operational	Launched on new dispenser, deployed four satellites at once.
19	Galileo-FOC FM15	GSAT0215 (Austria) (Nicole)	L9; 12 December 2017; 18:36	Guiana, ELA-3	Ariane 5 ES	VA-240	E21	A03	PHM	2	Operational	
20	Galileo-FOC FM16	GSAT0216 (Poland) (Zofia)	L9; 12 December 2017; 18:36	Guiana, ELA-3	Ariane 5 ES	VA-240	E25	A07	PHM	2	Operational	
21	Galileo-FOC FM17	GSAT0217 (Portugal) (Alexandre)	L9; 12 December 2017; 18:36	Guiana, ELA-3	Ariane 5 ES	VA-240	E27	A04	PHM	2	Operational	
22	Galileo-FOC FM18	GSAT0218 (Romania) (Irina)	L9; 12 December 2017; 18:36	Guiana, ELA-3	Ariane 5 ES	VA-240	E31	A01	PHM	2	Operational	
23	Galileo-FOC FM19	GSAT0219 (Slovenia) (Tara)	L10; 25 July 2018; 11:25	Guiana, ELA-3	Ariane 5 ES	VA-244	E36	B04	PHM	2	Operational	
24	Galileo-FOC FM20	GSAT0220 (Slovakia) (Samuel)	L10; 25 July 2018; 11:25	Guiana, ELA-3	Ariane 5 ES	VA-244	E13	B01	PHM	2	Operational	
25	Galileo-FOC FM21	GSAT0221 (Finland) (Anna)	L10; 25 July 2018; 11:25	Guiana, ELA-3	Ariane 5 ES	VA-244	E15	B02	PHM	2	Operational	
26	Galileo-FOC FM22	GSAT0222 (Sweden) (Ellen)	L10; 25 July 2018; 11:25	Guiana, ELA-3	Ariane 5 ES	VA-244	E33	B07	PHM	2	Operational	
27	Galileo-FOC FM23	GSAT0223 (Croatia) (Nikolina)	L11; 5 December 2021; 00:19	Guiana, ELS	Soyuz ST-B/ Fregat-MT	VS-26	E34	B03	PHM	3	Operational	
28	Galileo-FOC FM24	GSAT0224 (Norway) (Shriya)	L11; 5 December 2021; 00:19	Guiana, ELS	Soyuz ST-B/ Fregat-MT	VS-26	E10	B15	PHM	3	Operational	
29	Galileo-FOC FM25	GSAT0225	L12; 28 April 2024; 00:34	Kennedy, LC-39A	Falcon 9 Block 5	F9-327	E29	C05	PHM	3	Operational	
30	Galileo-FOC FM27	GSAT0227	L12; 28 April 2024; 00:34	Kennedy, LC-39A	Falcon 9 Block 5	F9-327	E06	C12	PHM	3	Operational	
31	Galileo-FOC FM26	GSAT0226	L13; 17 September 2024; 22:50	Cape Canaveral, SLC-40	Falcon 9 Block 5	F9-375	E23	A02	PHM	3	Operational	
32	Galileo-FOC FM32	GSAT0232	L13; 17 September 2024; 22:50	Cape Canaveral, SLC-40	Falcon 9 Block 5	F9-375	E16	A08	PHM	3	Operational	
33	Galileo-FOC FM33	GSAT0233	L14; 17 December 2025; 05:01	Guiana, ELA-4	Ariane 62	VA-266	E28	C13	PHM	3	Operational	
34	Galileo-FOC FM34	GSAT0234	L14; 17 December 2025; 05:01	Guiana, ELA-4	Ariane 62	VA-266	E32	C17	PHM	3	Operational	
Scheduled launches
35	Galileo-FOC FM29	GSAT0229	L15; December 2026	Guiana, ELA-4	Ariane 62					3	Planned	
36	Galileo-FOC FM30	GSAT0230	L15; December 2026	Guiana, ELA-4	Ariane 62					3	Planned	
37	Galileo-FOC FM28	GSAT0228	L16; Q1 2027	Guiana, ELA-4	Ariane 62					3	Planned	
38	Galileo-FOC FM31	GSAT0231	L16; Q1 2027	Guiana, ELA-4	Ariane 62					3	Planned	
39	Galileo-G2G-1	G2SB1A	L17; 2027	Guiana, ELA-4	Ariane 62 (Block 2)					–	Planned	First G2G satellite from Thales Alenia Space.
40	Galileo-G2G-2	G2SB1B	L17; 2027	Guiana, ELA-4	Ariane 62 (Block 2)					–	Planned	First G2G satellite from Airbus Defence and Space.
41	Galileo-G2G-3	G2SB2A	L18; 2027	Guiana, ELA-4	Ariane 62 (Block 2)					–	Planned	
42	Galileo-G2G-4	G2SB2B	L18; 2027	Guiana, ELA-4	Ariane 62 (Block 2)					–	Planned	
43	Galileo-G2G-5	G2SB3A	TBD							–	Planned	In production as of May 2025.
44	Galileo-G2G-6	G2SB3B	TBD							–	Planned	In production as of May 2025
References: European GNSS Service Centre; Gunter's Space Page.

=== E5 quasi-pilot signal ===
To improve the performance of the Galileo Open Service, the E5 Quasi-Pilot signal component was introduced November 2025. The primary objective is a faster Time to First Fix, improved typically by factor 3.

Satellites reconfigured for E5 Quasi-pilot	Start of QP transmission
GSAT0216	17 Nov 2025
GSAT0221	03 Dec 2025
GSAT0226	08 Dec 2025
GSAT0223	10 Dec 2025
GSAT0219	17 Mar 2026
GSAT0222	19 Mar 2026
GSAT0225	24 Mar 2026
GSAT0220	30 Mar 2026
GSAT0217	02 Apr 2026
GSAT0214	07 Apr 2026
GSAT0215	15 Apr 2026
GSAT0213	28 Apr 2026

== Orbital slots ==
Refer to Galileo Constellation Information for the most up-to-date information.

Slot	Relative Mean Anomaly	Plane Relative RAAN)			
Slot	Relative Mean Anomaly	A (0°)	B (120°)	C (240°)	Ext
01	0°	0218	0220	0214	(0201)
02	45°	0226	0221	0209	(0202)
03	90°	0215	0223	0213	
04	135°	0217	0219	0103	
05	180°	0206	0101	0225	
06	225°	0211	0102	0207	
07	270°	0216	0222	0208	
08	315°	0232	0203	0212	
12		(0210)		0227	
13				0233	
14			(0204)	~~0104~~	
15			0224		
17				0234	
?		~~0205~~			
Numbers in (parentheses) refer to unavailable satellites. Numbers in italics refer to under commissioning satellites. Numbers ~~deleted~~ refer to retired satellites. References: European GNSS Service Centre.

== See also ==
- List of BeiDou satellites
- List of GLONASS satellites
- List of GPS satellites
- List of NAVIC satellites
