= Yantar-4K2M =

Russian spy satellite

- Manufacturer: TsSKB
- Country of origin: Russia
- Operator: GRU
- Applications: Reconnaissance satellite

Specifications
- Bus: Yantar
- Equipment: film camera
- Regime: Low Earth Orbit

Production
- Status: Retired
- Launched: 10
- Operational: 0
- Retired: 10
- Maiden launch: 24 September 2004 (Kosmos 2410)
- Last launch: 5 June 2015 (Kosmos 2505)
- Last retirement: 17 September 2015 (Kosmos 2505)

Related spacecraft
- Derived from: Yantar-4K2

Yantar-4K2M (Russian: Янтарь meaning amber), also known as Kobalt-M, was a type of Russian reconnaissance satellite and the last operational member of the Yantar series of satellites. In common with most Yantar satellites, the Kobalt-M used film rather than digital cameras. This film could not be sent to Earth as easily as digital data.

The Kobalt-M was an improved version of the Kobalt satellite and the first one was launched as Kosmos 2410 in 2004. It returned three sets of film during its mission. The first two landed in film return canisters (called SpK - Spuskayemaya Kapsula) and a final set of film returned in the satellite's special equipment module. Image resolution is reportedly 30 cm.

Ten satellites of this series were launched, the last one in 2015. No further orders were planned. Further reconnaissance missions were taken over by the Persona-class satellites.

== Launches ==
Satellite	Launch date	Landing date	Mission Length
Kosmos 2410	24 September 2004	10 January 2005	108 days
Kosmos 2420	3 May 2006	19 July 2006	76 days
Kosmos 2427	7 June 2007	23 August 2007	76 days
Kosmos 2445	14 November 2008	23 February 2009	101 days
Kosmos 2450	29 April 2009	27 July 2009	89 days
Kosmos 2462	10 April 2010	21 July 2010	102 days
Kosmos 2472	27 June 2011	24 October 2011	119 days
Kosmos 2480	17 May 2012	24 September 2012	130 days
Kosmos 2495	6 May 2014	2 September 2014	119 days
Kosmos 2505	5 June 2015	17 September 2015	104 days
