= Kosmos 2445 =

Russian optical reconnaissance Spacecraft

Cosmos-2445
- Mission type: Imaging technology
- Operator: Roscosmos State Corporation
- COSPAR ID: 2008-058A
- SATCAT no.: 33439
- Mission duration: 102 Days

Spacecraft properties
- Spacecraft type: Yantar-4K2M
- Manufacturer: Progress Rocket Space Centre

Start of mission
- Launch date: November 14, 2008
- Rocket: Soyuz-U
- Launch site: Plesetsk Cosmodrome
- Contractor: Roscosmos State Corporation

End of mission
- Last contact: February 23, 2009
- Decay date: February 23, 2009

Orbital parameters
- Reference system: Geocentric
- Regime: Low Earth
- Perigee altitude: 183 KM
- Apogee altitude: 340 KM
- Inclination: 67.18°

Cosmos-2445 was launched from the Plesetsk Cosmodrome on a Soyuz-U rocket on November 14, 2008. It is an optical reconnaissance Spacecraft of the Yantar-4K2M class. It re-entered on February 23, 2009, after 102 days in space It broke into two fragments that burned up later on in the re-entry sequence.

== See also ==
- Soyuz-U
- Roscosmos State Corporation
