= Kosmos 2472 =

Russian Kobalt-M reconnaissance satellite

- Mission type: Reconnaissance satellite
- Operator: GRU
- COSPAR ID: 2011-028A
- SATCAT no.: 37726
- Mission duration: 119 days

Spacecraft properties
- Spacecraft type: Kobalt-M

Start of mission
- Launch date: 27 June 2011, 16:00 UTC
- Rocket: Soyuz-U
- Launch site: Plesetsk 16/2

End of mission
- Landing date: 24 October 2011

Orbital parameters
- Reference system: Geocentric
- Regime: Low Earth Orbit
- Perigee altitude: 217 kilometres (135 mi)
- Apogee altitude: 338 kilometres (210 mi)
- Inclination: 81.3 degrees
- Period: 90.06 minutes
- Epoch: 29 June 2011

Kosmos 2472 (Russian: Космос 2472 meaning Cosmos 2472) was a Russian Kobalt-M reconnaissance satellite which was launched in 2011 by the Russian Aerospace Defence Forces. It was launched in June 2011 and remained in orbit until October 2011.

Kosmos 2472 was launched from Site 16/2 at Plesetsk Cosmodrome. A Soyuz-U carrier rocket was used to perform the launch, which took place at 16:00 UTC on 27 June 2011. The launch successfully placed the satellite into low Earth orbit. It subsequently received its Kosmos designation, and the international designator 2011-028A. The United States Space Command assigned it the Satellite Catalog Number 37726.

== Kobalt-M ==
Kobalt-M satellites are a type of Yantar satellite, Yantar-4K2M. They have the GRAU index 11F695M. They are optical reconnaissance satellites which use film. The satellite sends two film capsules to Earth and returns to Earth itself at the end of its mission. This has the disadvantage that the satellite's life is dependent on how much film it can carry, and information from the satellite is not obtained until the film canister has returned to Earth and been developed.

== See also ==
- List of Kosmos satellites (2251–2500)
- List of R-7 launches (2010–2014)
