= Helios 2 (satellite) =

2000s European military observation satellites

The Helios 2 system, which consisted of the Helios 2A and Helios 2B, was a French-developed military Earth observation satellite program. Financed at 90% by France, the development also involved minor participation from Belgium, Spain, Italy and Greece. Helios 2A was launched on 18 December 2004 by an Ariane 5 rocket from French Guiana.

Helios 2B was launched five years later, on 18 December 2009, carried also by an Ariane 5. The two satellites are identical. They carry a Thales-built high-resolution visible and thermal infrared instrument with 35 cm resolution, and an Airbus-built medium-resolution instrument. The Helios 2 satellite bus is nearly identical to the platform built by EADS Astrium for the Spot 5 civil-commercial optical observation satellite.

The Helios 2 was replaced by the Composante Spatiale Optique (CSO), a French program of three military observation satellites. As according to Space track data Helios 2A and 2B orbit lowering took place in April 2022, with Helios 2B re-entering on 14th Dec 2023. The first satellite (CSO-1) was launched on 15 December 2018, the second (CSO-2) on 29 December 2020, with the final launch (CSO-3) being scheduled for 2024.

== See also ==
- Hélios 1, the previous generation
- CSO, the follow-on system
