= Stéphane Israël =

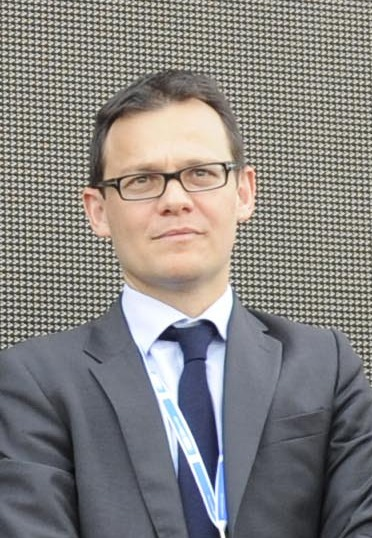
- Stéphane Israël in 2013
- Born: 3 January 1971 (age 55); Paris, France
- Education: Lycée Henri-IV
- Alma mater: École normale supérieure École nationale d'administration

Stéphane Israël (born 3 January 1971) is a senior French civil servant. He was a magistrate at the Court of Audit, chief of staff at the French Minister of Economics, Arnaud Montebourg; worked in the aeronautics industry at Astrium, a subsidiary of European Aeronautic Defence and Space Company. He was appointed CEO of Arianespace in 2013. He departed from his position as CEO at the end of 2024.

== Early life and education ==
Stéphane Israël is the son of a law professor and a psychoanalyst. He attended the Lycée Jean-Baptiste-Say and the Lycée Henri-IV (both in Paris). There he published a school newspaper entitled Le Même et l'Autre. As an admirer of François Mitterrand, he was active in his youth in the SOS Racisme association.

From 1994 to 1995 he was a teaching assistant at Harvard University in the United States.

He entered the École normale supérieure in 1991 where he studied history. He graduated with a DEA, which corresponds to a master's degree. He also graduated from the École nationale d'administration.

== Career ==
In 2001 Israël was appointed to the French Court of Auditors, where he was assigned to the 2nd Chamber, responsible for national defense, space travel and industry. There he mainly dealt with French space policy.

From 2005 to 2007 he was an associate professor at the École normal supérieure.

Israël is author of several historical works. In 1994 he wrote a text about the historian Jérôme Carcopino in Les Facs sous Vichy. Among his texts is a book from 2005 about the students of the École normal supérieure during the Second World War.

In 2007 he began his career in the aerospace industry as a consultant to Louis Gallois, then CEO of EADS. He spent four years as EADS subsidiary Astrium, where he participated in the intercontinental ballistic missile nprogramms M51. From 2010 to 2012 he was head of the European Earth observation program Copernicus Programme at Astrium Services.

From May 2012, Stéphane Israël headed the cabinet of the French Minister for Economic Affairs, Arnaud Montebourg. In 2013 negotiations between the French government and the steel company ArcelorMittal led to a dispute between Israël and Montebourg. As a result, the minister is said to have separated from his colleague. This was publicly denied.

Following the appointment of Jean-Yves Le Gall, the previous CEO of Arianespace, as President of the French space agency CNES, Stéphane Israël was announced as his successor. On April 18, 2013, the Arianespace Board of Directors unanimously named him CEO. At the same time, he was named CEO of Starsem, a Euro-Russian company that launched the Soyuz launcher from the Baikonur Cosmodrome. Boris Vallaud replaced him as Chief of Staff of Arnaud Montebourg.

After the restructuring of Arianespace in April 2017, he also became Executive Vice President of ArianeGroup, where he is responsible for all civil launchers.

He departed from his position as CEO and Executive Vice President at the end of 2024.
