= Composante Spatiale Optique =

French military Earth observation satellite program

Composante Optique Spatiale
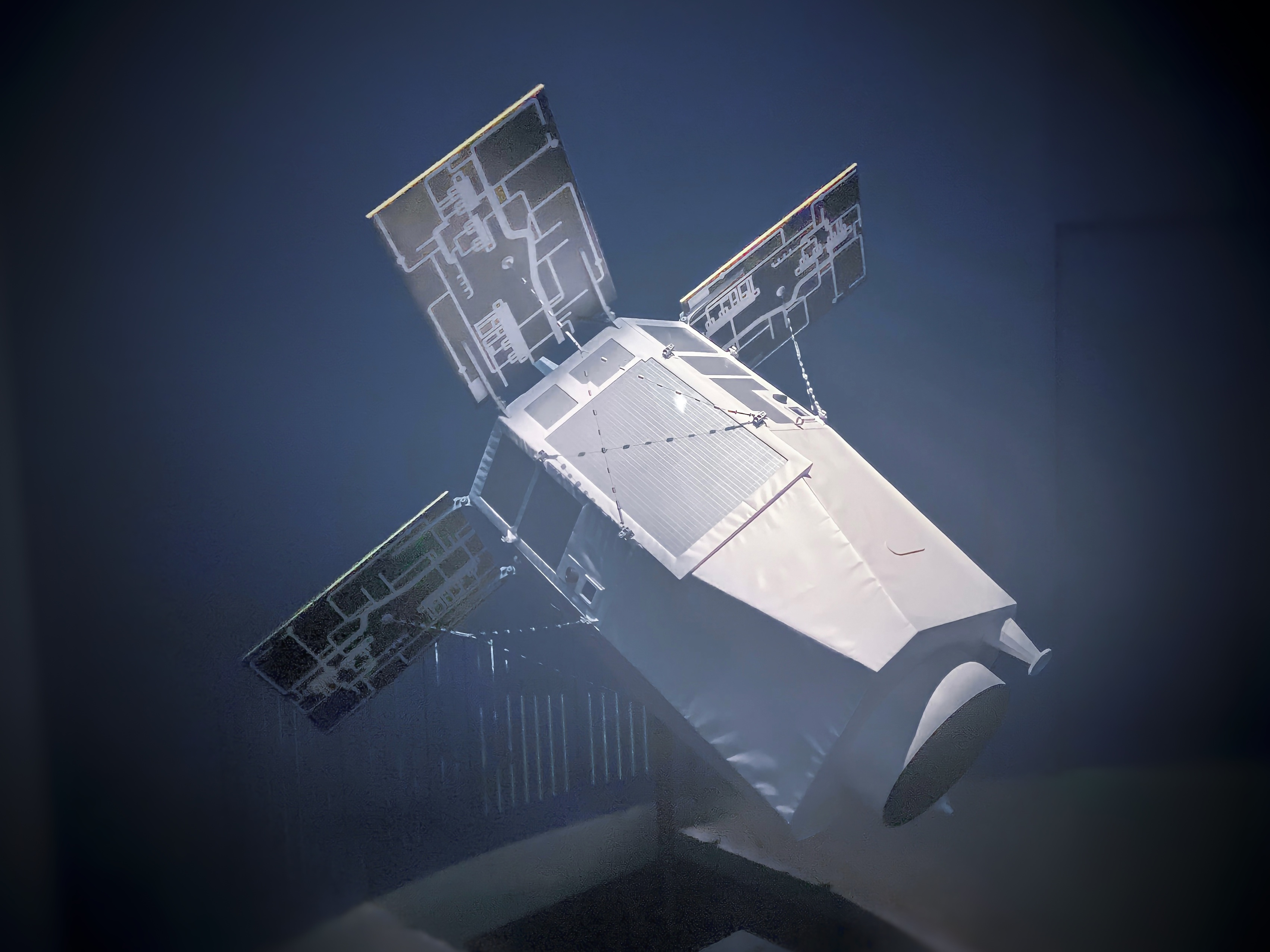
- Names: CSO-1; CSO-2; CSO-3
- Mission type: Military reconnaissance
- Operator: CNES / DGA
- COSPAR ID: 2018-106A (CSO-1); 2020-104A (CSO-2); 2025-044A (CSO-3)
- SATCAT no.: 43866 (CSO-1); 47305 (CSO-2); 63156 (CSO-3)
- Mission duration: 10 years (planned)

Spacecraft properties
- Bus: CSO
- Manufacturer: Airbus Defence and Space (satellite); Thales Alenia Space (optical payload)
- Launch mass: 3,655 kg (8,058 lb) (CSO-1); 3,652 kg (8,051 lb) (CSO-2)

Start of mission
- Launch date: 19 December 2018, 13:37:00 UTC (CSO-1); 29 December 2020, 16:42:07 UTC (CSO-2); 6 March 2025, 16:24:26 UTC (CSO-3)
- Rocket: Soyuz ST-A (CSO-1, CSO-2); Ariane 62 (CSO-3)
- Launch site: Guiana Space Centre, ELS (CSO-1, CSO-2); Guiana Space Centre, ELA-4 (CSO-3)
- Contractor: Progress Rocket Space Centre, Arianespace

Orbital parameters
- Reference system: Geocentric orbit
- Regime: Sun-synchronous orbit
- Altitude: 800 km (500 mi) (CSO-1); 480 km (300 mi) (CSO-2); 800 km (500 mi) (CSO-3)
- Inclination: 98.6° (CSO-1/CSO-3); 97.3° (CSO-2)

Composante Spatiale Optique (CSO; English: Optical Space Component) is a French military Reconnaissance satellite program of third generation. It replaces the Helios 2 satellites. It is sometimes referred to as the MUltinational Space-based Imaging System for Surveillance, Reconnaissance and Observation (MUSIS program).

== Program history ==
Since the launch of Helios 1A in 1995, France has developed a series of military Earth observation programs. Due to the limited lifetime of satellites, a program was launched to replace the currently operational Helios 2 satellites. This program started as a French contribution to the larger pan-European MUSIS program, and eventually became a mostly French program. An agreement between France and Germany was reached in April 2015, under which Germany contributes €200 million to building a third satellite, and in exchange receives access rights to the imagery. Sweden and Belgium are also a program partners, which enables the use of a polar ground station.

== Technical capabilities ==
Unlike the Helios satellites, which used the same bus as the Spot satellites, CSO uses technology derived from the Pléiades satellites. It is much heavier than Pléiades with a mass of 3650 kg. They are made out of 3 identical satellites. The first one was launched in December 2018, and provide Very High Resolution imagery - like the Helios 2 satellites, around 35 cm from an 800 km orbit. The second satellite provides Extremely High Resolution imagery - around 20 cm - from a 480 km orbit. The third satellite was launched in March 2025 and provides increased revisit capabilities. The satellites have the ability to take infrared images. The satellite manufacturing was awarded to Airbus Defence and Space, while the optical payload is built by Thales Alenia Space.

The CSO system is able to produce at least 280 images a day on average.

The program cost is estimated at €1.3 billion, with an additional €300 million for the ground segment and 10 years of operations. The marginal cost of the third satellite is €300 million.
