= Jean-Yves Le Gall =

French engineer (born 1959)

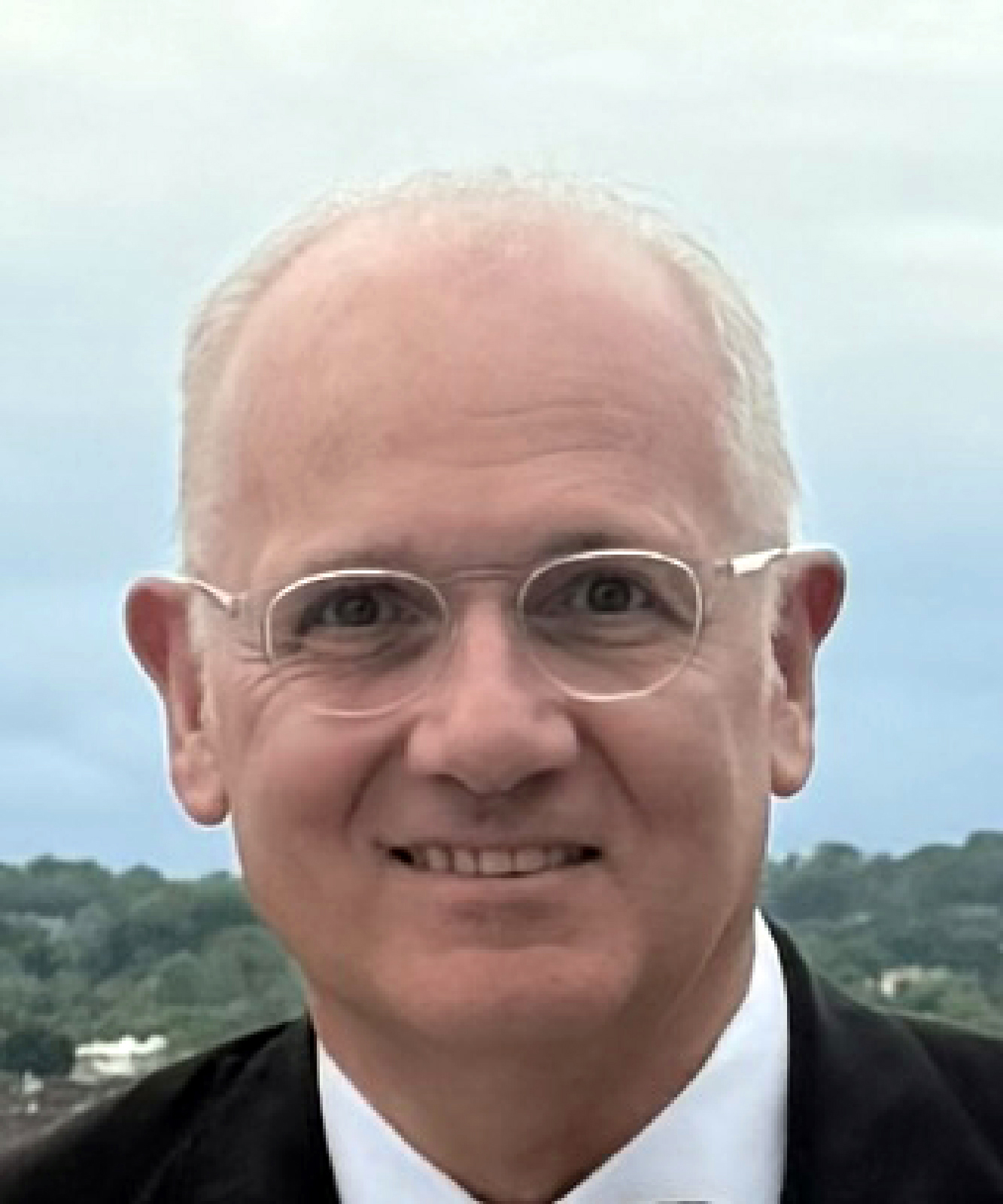

11th president of the French Space Agency
- In office 3 April 2013 – 2021
- Preceded by: Yannick d'Escatha
- Succeeded by: Philippe Baptiste

Personal details
- Born: 30 April 1959 (age 67) Marseille, France
- Education: SupOptique; University of Paris-Sud

Jean-Yves Le Gall (born 30 April 1959) is a French aerospace engineer who worked as governmental official and executive in the French space industry.

== Education and career ==
Le Gall studied engineering at the École supérieure d'optique and graduated in 1981. He obtained a doctorate in engineering from the University of Paris-Sud in 1983. He began his career in 1981 as a researcher at the Astronomy Laboratory, French National Scientific Research Center, where he worked on the European scientific satellites project Hipparcos and ISO. In 1985 he joined the Department of Industry and was assigned to the Space Office where he was particularly in charge of relations with the space industry.

The Minister for the Postal Service, Telecommunications and Space appointed Le Gall as advisor for space affairs in 1985. In this position, he participated in the definition of CNES and ESA programs. In 1993, he joined Novespace, a subsidiary of CNES, of which he was Managing Director. Le Gall was appointed as CNES Deputy Managing Director in 1996. In this function, he was the French Representative to the ESA. In 1998, he was appointed as Chairman and CEO of Starsem.

In 2001, he joined Arianespace as COO. Since 2002 till April 2013 he worked as an Arianespace CEO, was succeeded by Stéphane Israël. Since 2013 Jean-Yves Le Gall is a president of CNES.

== Honors and recognitions ==
Le Gall was named by Aviation Week & Space Technology magazine as its 2014 Laureate for Space, based on his work at Arianespace. In 2006 he received title of "Satellite Executive of the Year" from Via Satellite magazine.
