= Hydrogen maser =

Device used as a frequency standard

Diagram of a hydrogen maser

A hydrogen maser, also known as hydrogen frequency standard, is a specific type of maser that uses the intrinsic properties of the hydrogen atom to serve as a precision frequency reference.

It was originally conceived by Charles H. Townes, and first realized by Norman Ramsey Jr., Daniel Kleppner and H. Mark Goldenberg in 1960.

== Overview ==
Both the proton and electron of a hydrogen atom have spins. The atom has a higher energy if both spins are aligned, and a lower energy if they are opposed. The amount of energy needed to reverse the spin of the electron is that of a radio-frequency photon with the frequency of 1.420405751768 GHz and wavelength of 21 cm which is detected as a "line" of the hydrogen spectrum.

There are two types to be distinguished: active and passive. In both types, a small storage bottle of molecular hydrogen, H_{2}, leaks a controlled amount of gas into a discharge bulb. The molecules are dissociated in the discharge bulb into individual hydrogen atoms by an electric arc. The atomic hydrogen atoms pass through a collimator and then a magnetic state selector (typically a hexapole focusing magnet), and finally, into a storage bulb. This selects for an excess of F=1, M_{F}= 1 quantum states over the F=0 state, generating the population inversion needed for a maser. This leads to the continuous stimulated emission of the characteristic hyperfine transition. The storage bulb is roughly 20 cm high and 10 cm in diameter and made of quartz internally coated with Teflon (PTFE), as adsorption onto, chemical interaction with, and perturbation of atomic state by the bulb surface is much reduced. Consistent interactions with the bulb increase the quality of the oscillation. This durable PTFE and bulb coating technology allows for over 20-year lifetime.

The storage bulb is inside a microwave cavity made from a precisely machined copper or silver-plated ceramic cylinder. This cavity is tuned to the 1.420 GHz resonance frequency of the atoms. A weak static magnetic field is applied parallel to the cavity axis by a solenoid to lift the degeneracy of the magnetic Zeeman sublevels. To decrease the influence of changing external magnetic fields on the transition line frequency and be resistant to electromagnetic interferences, the cavity is surrounded by several nested layers of shields.

In the active hydrogen maser, the cavity oscillates by itself. This requires a higher hydrogen atom density and a higher quality factor for the cavity. With advanced microwave cavities made out of silver-plated ceramic, the gain factor can be much higher, thereby requiring less hydrogen atom density. The active maser is more complex and more expensive but has better short-term and long-term frequency stabilities.

In the passive hydrogen maser, the cavity is fed from an external 1.420 GHz frequency. The external frequency is tuned to produce a maximum output in the cavity. This allows the use of lower hydrogen atom density and lower cavity quality factor, which reduces the cost.

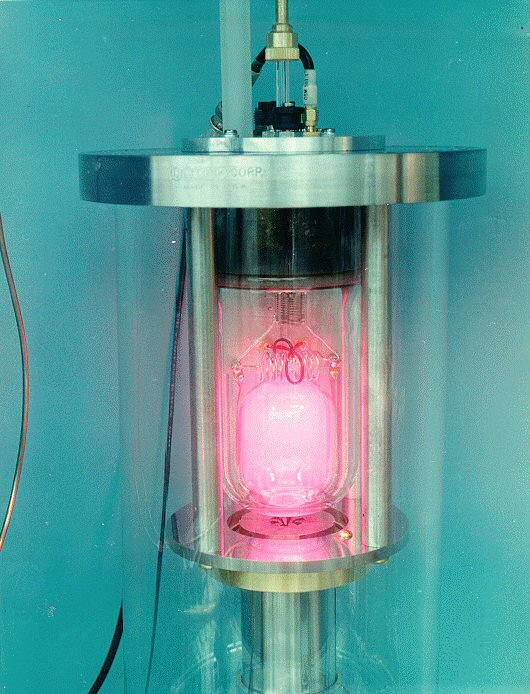
An exposed hydrogen maser

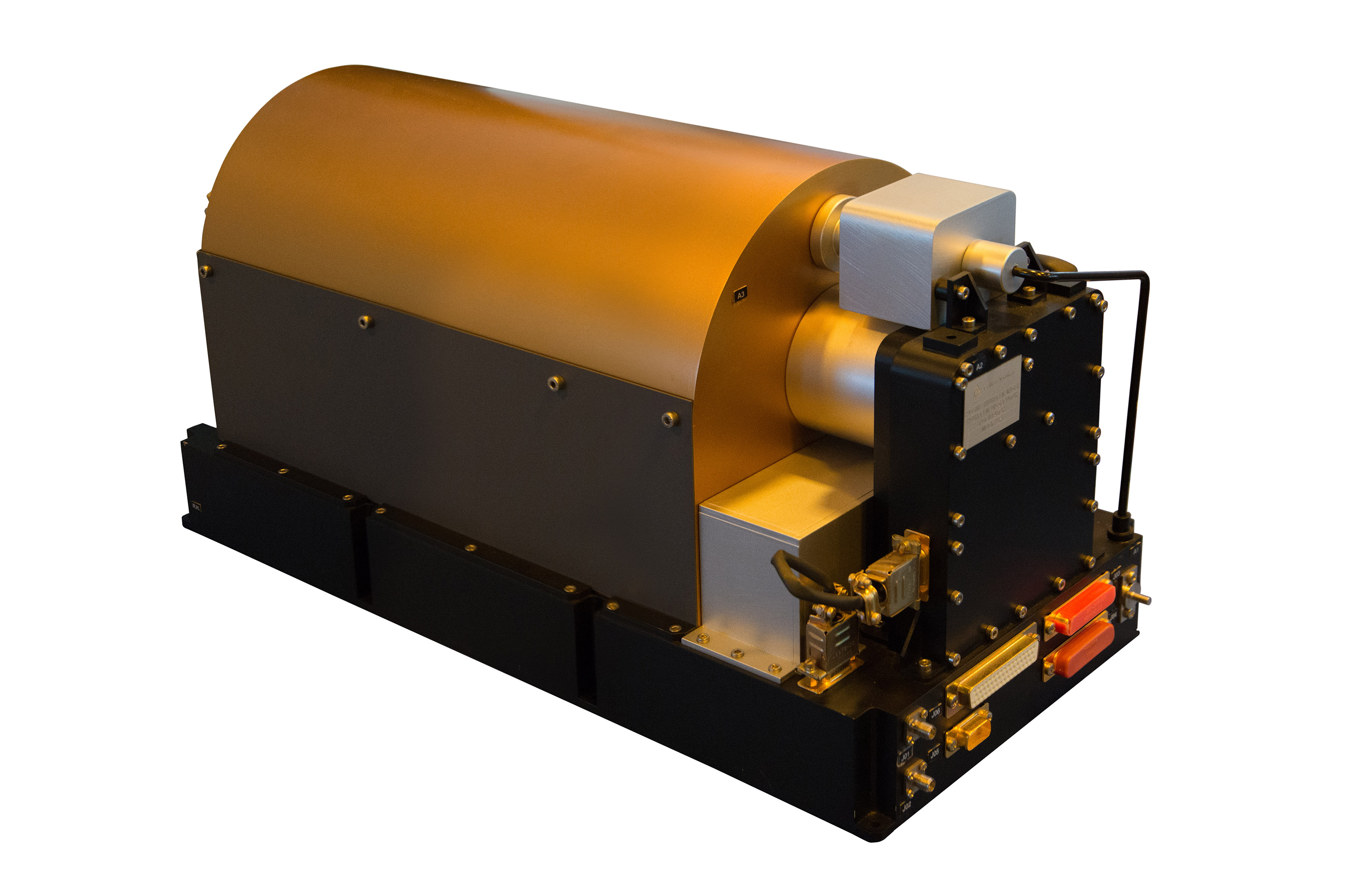
A passive hydrogen maser used as a clock in Galileo satellite navigation system

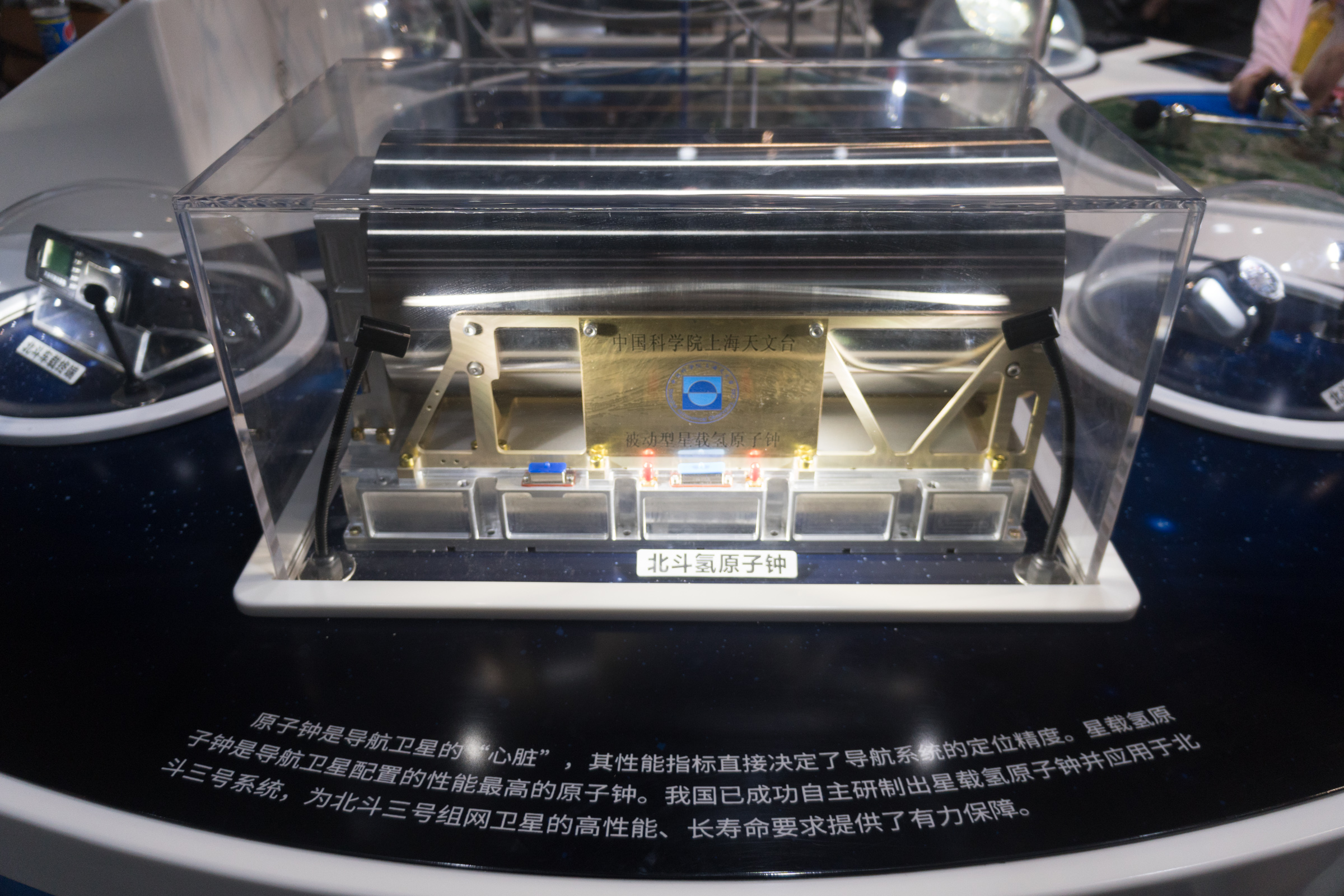
A hydrogen maser used by BeiDou-3

== See also ==
- Timeline of hydrogen technologies

== Bibliography ==
- Bauch, A. (2007). "Atomic frequency standards, properties and applications". In Hänsch, T.W.; Leschiutta, S.; Wallard, A.J. (eds.). Metrology and Fundamental Constants. Vol. Course CLXVI. Società Italiana di Fisica. Amsterdam: IOS Press. pp. 303–308. ISBN 978-1-58603-784-0. LCCN 2007934139.
- Kleppner, D.; Goldenberg, H.M.; Ramsey, N.F. (1962). "The Atomic Hydrogen Maser". Physical Review. 126 (2): 603. Bibcode:1962PhRv..126..603K. doi:10.1103/PhysRev.126.603.
