= Yantar (satellite) =

Series of Russian reconnaissance satellites

Yantar (Russian: Янтарь, "Amber") were a series of Russian (previously Soviet) reconnaissance satellites, which supplemented and eventually replaced the Zenit spacecraft. Kosmos 2175, a Yantar-4K2 or Kobalt spacecraft, was the first satellite to be launched by the Russian Federation following the dissolution of the Soviet Union. Yantar-Terilen was the first real-time digital system. Yantar satellites also formed the basis for the later Orlets, Resurs and Persona satellites. 179 have been launched, nine of which were lost in launch failures. All Yantar satellites were launched using the Soyuz-U carrier rocket until Kosmos 2480 in 2012 which was announced as the last launch of that rocket from Plesetsk. Subsequent launches used the modernized Soyuz-2.1a rocket. The last Yantar mission was Kosmos 2505, a Yantar-4K2M or Kobalt-M, launched on 5 June 2015. Reconnaissance missions have been taken over by the Persona class of satellites.

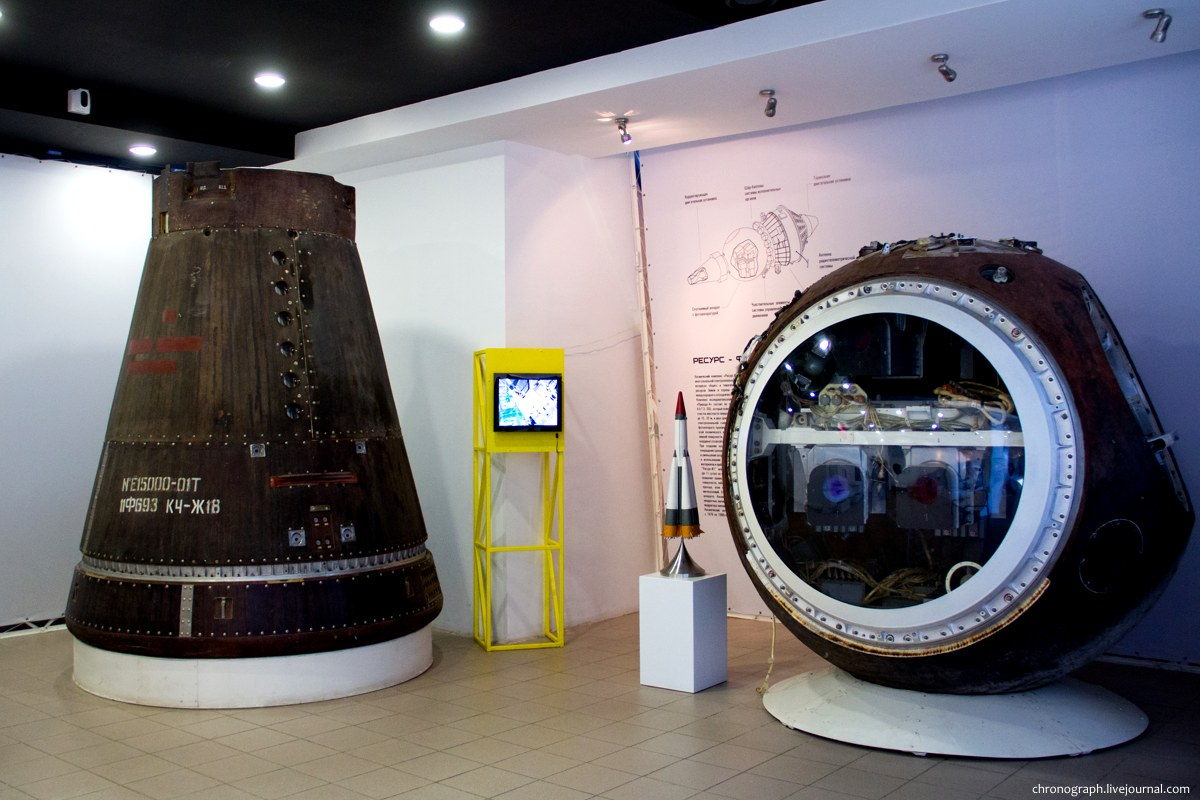
Yantar 2K and Resurs F1

== History ==
In 1964, Soviet design bureau OKB-1 was tasked with improving on the newly operational Zenit-2 reconnaissance satellites. They had three streams of work: modifying Zenit satellites, a crewed reconnaissance craft called Soyuz-R and a new photoreconnaissance satellite based on Soyuz-R. The third stream was code-named Yantar and initially there were to be two types - Yantar-1 for medium resolution imaging and Yantar-2 for high resolution. In 1967, a new high resolution satellite was proposed called Yantar-2K. Yantar-2K received government support with the first flight originally planned for 1970, although this deadline slipped.

The Yantar program produced two memorable launch accidents. The first of these was on May 15, 1996 when an attempted launch of a 1KFT (Kometa) at Baikonur's LC-31 failed 50 seconds after liftoff when the payload fairing disintegrated. The satellite was destroyed by aerodynamic forces, but the booster continued to fly until T+126 seconds when it began to drift off its flight path, leading to an automatic shutdown command. On June 20, a few weeks later, a 4K1 (Oktan) launched from Plesetsk's LC-16 and met nearly the same fate when again the payload fairing disintegrated 50 seconds after launch. This time the onboard destruct system on the satellite activated and destroyed it, after which ground controllers sent a manual shutdown command to the booster, which crashed 4 miles (6 kilometers) from the pad. The back-to-back failures were traced to a manufacturing defect in the payload shrouds, which were produced in a batch, and they left Russia's ability to perform military reconnaissance severely hampered. In both cases, the shrouds broke up at the point of maximum aerodynamic pressure during ascent.

== Variants ==
=== Yantar-2K ===
Yantar-2K differed from Zenit in that it had to stay in orbit for a month unlike Zenit's 8–14 days. It also had two film return capsules, something it had in common with the US KH-7 GAMBIT reconnaissance satellite. It had three parts: the aggregate/equipment module (AO - Agregatnyy Otsek), the instrument module (PO - Pribornnyy Otsek) and the special equipment module/special apparatus module (OSA - otsek spetsial'noy apparatury). The special equipment module was the part that returned to earth at the end of the mission, and contained the Zhemchug-4 (pearl) camera. Each section was shaped like a truncated cone which gave the craft a conical shape. The craft was 6.3m long (although one source says 8.5m) with a maximum diameter of 2.7m. It weighed 6.6 tonnes.

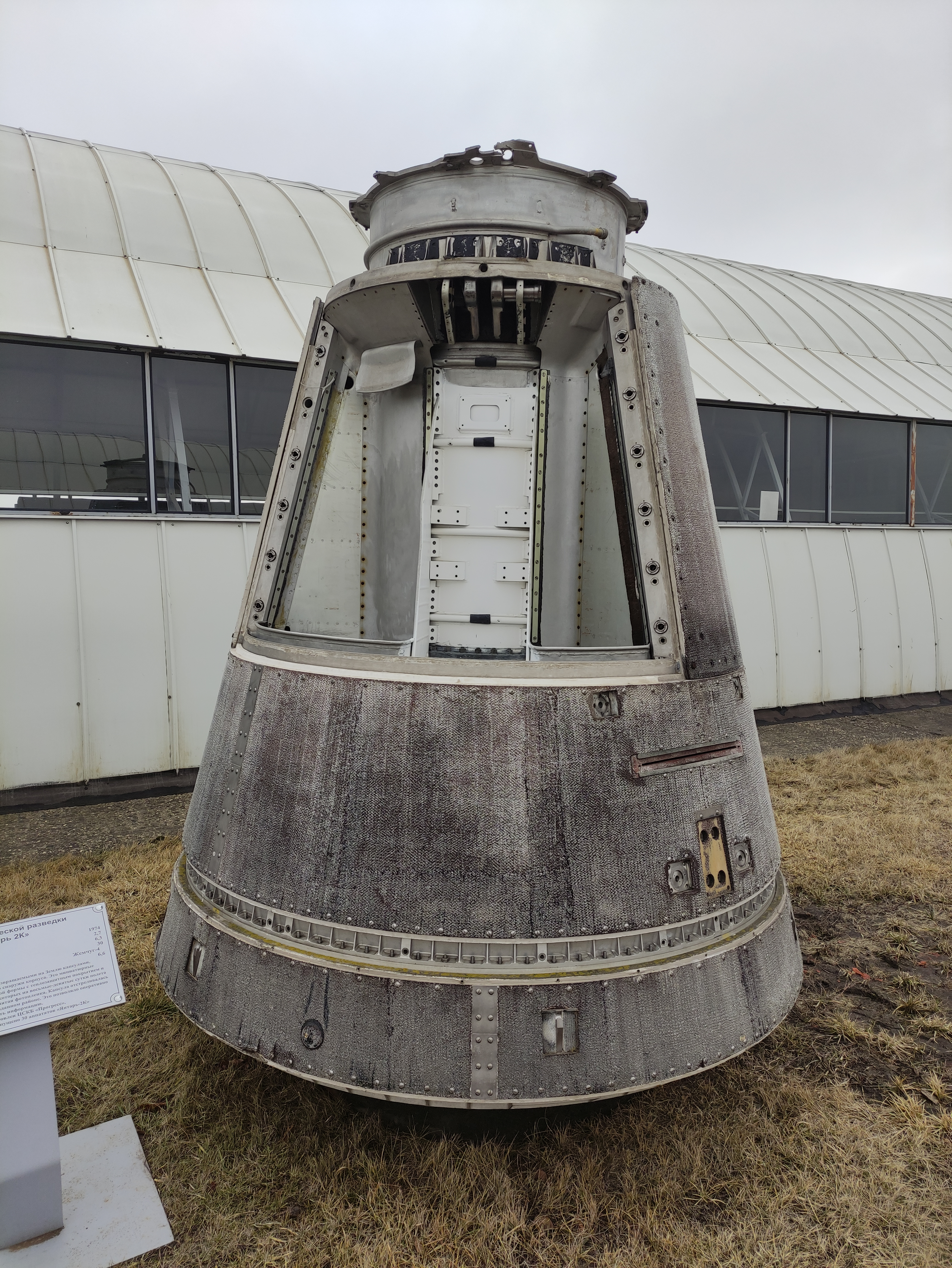
Yantar-2K in Togliatti Technical Museum

=== Yantar-4K1 ===
Yantar-4K1 was a modification of the Yantar-2K. It had a better camera, the Zhemchug-18, and was in orbit for 45 days rather than the 30 days of Yantar-2K. Other systems were the same as the Yantar-2K and both types of satellites were launched in the same period. Both satellites were retired in 1984.

Series	Other designations	GRAU index	First launch	Last launch	Number launched	Remarks
Yantar-2K	Feniks (Russian: Феникс meaning phoenix)	11F624	23 May 1974	28 June 1983	30	
Yantar-4K1	Oktan (Russian: Октан meaning octane)	11F693	27 April 1979	30 November 1983	12	
Yantar-1KFT	Kometa (Russian: Комета meaning comet); Siluet (Russian: Силуэт meaning silhouette)	11F660	18 February 1981	2 September 2005	21	
Yantar-4K2	Kobalt (Russian: Кобальт meaning cobalt)	11F695	21 August 1981	25 February 2002	82	
Yantar-4KS1	Terilen (Russian: Терилен meaning terylene)	11F694	28 December 1982	21 December 1990	15	
Yantar-4KS1M	Neman (Russian: Неман meaning Neman)	17F117	10 July 1991	3 May 2000	9	
Yantar-4K2M	Kobalt-M	11F695M	24 September 2004	5 June 2015	10	
