= Meteor-3M No.1 =

Weather satellite

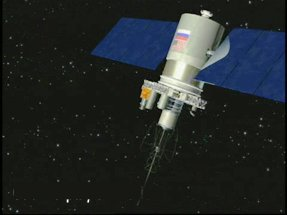
- Mission type: Weather
- Operator: Roscosmos/Roshydromet
- COSPAR ID: 2001-056A
- SATCAT no.: 27001
- Mission duration: Planned: 3 years In Orbit: 23 years, 3 months and 2 days

Spacecraft properties
- Manufacturer: VNIIEM
- Launch mass: 2,500 kilograms (5,500 lb)
- Payload mass: 800 kilograms (1,800 lb)
- Power: 800 watts

Start of mission
- Launch date: 10 December 2001, 17:18:57 UTC
- Rocket: Zenit-2
- Launch site: Baikonur Site 45/1

End of mission
- Disposal: Decommissioned
- Deactivated: March 2006

Orbital parameters
- Reference system: Geocentric
- Regime: SSO
- Eccentricity: 0.00135
- Perigee altitude: 1,016 kilometres (631 mi)
- Apogee altitude: 996 kilometres (619 mi)
- Inclination: 99.64 degrees
- Period: 105.3 minutes

Meteor-3M No.1 was the first and only of the Meteor-3M series polar-orbiting weather satellites. It was launched on 10 December 2001 at 17:18:57 UTC from the Baikonur Cosmodrome in Kazakhstan. The satellite is in a Sun-synchronous orbit with an ascending node time of about 9 AM.

== Capabilities ==
An APT transmission was planned to only have a reduced resolution (2 km) visible channel data. The status of any APT capability on this satellite was unclear, but it was thought not to have an APT transmitter. No APT transmissions were received from this satellite. SLR mission support began on 1 May 2002.

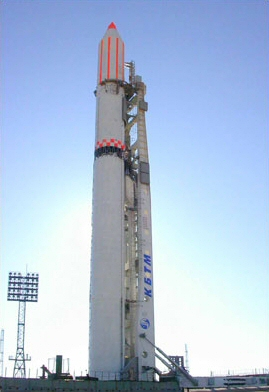
Meteor-3M satellite atop its Zenit-2 launcher

Secondary mission objective was the flight testing of the novel-type spherical retroreflector for precise laser ranging.

== ILRS Mission Support Status ==
SLR was used for precise orbit determination and retroreflector research.

== Instrumentation ==
- SAGE III
- Spherical retroreflector
- Other weather monitoring instruments

== Retro-reflector Array (RRA) characteristics ==
The retro-reflector was a glass ball 60 mm in diameter, fastened in a holder providing observation from Earth at elevations of more than 30° (the retroreflector field of view was centered in the Nadir direction). The spherical retro-reflector with its holder was fixed to the Meteor-3M No.1 spacecraft. The expected return signal strength level was between LAGEOS and ETALON.

== SAGE III ==
Meteor-3M No.1 included the SAGE III (Stratospheric Aerosol and Gas Experiment) payload and other instruments designed to measure temperature and humidity profiles, clouds, surface properties, and high energy particles in the upper atmosphere. SAGE III was a gyrating spectrometer that measured ultraviolet/visible light, which was used to enhance understanding of natural and human-derived atmospheric processes by providing accurate long-term measurements of the vertical structure of aerosols, ozone, water vapor, and other important trace gases in the upper troposphere and stratosphere.

== End of mission ==
Technical problems affecting the satellite two years after launch left it almost completely disabled. Meteor-3M No.1 functioned until March 2006, after which it was decommissioned. Meteor-M No.1, a replacement satellite, was launched on 17 September 2009.

== See also ==
- Meteor
