= Meteor-M No.2 =

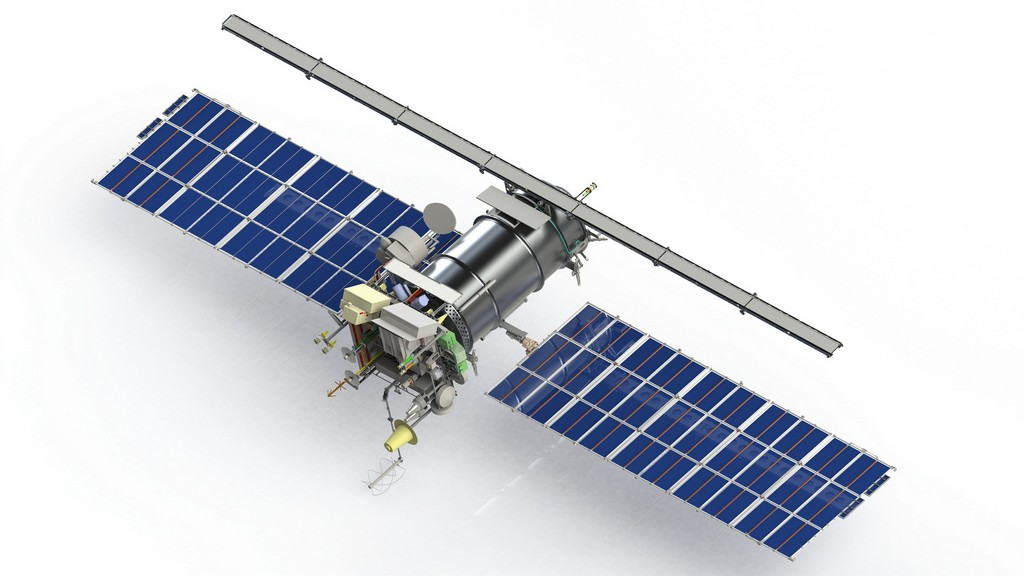
- Mission type: Weather
- Operator: Roscosmos/Roshydromet
- COSPAR ID: 2014-037A
- SATCAT no.: 40069
- Mission duration: 8 years, 5 months, 16 days (Operational); 9 years, 10 months, 24 days (Mission Duration)

Spacecraft properties
- Manufacturer: VNIIEM
- Launch mass: 2,900 kilograms (6,400 lb)
- Power: 2000 Watts

Start of mission
- Launch date: 8 July 2014
- Launch site: Baikonur

End of mission
- Declared: 1 June 2024
- Last contact: 24 December 2024

Orbital parameters
- Reference system: Geocentric
- Regime: Sun-synchronous
- Perigee altitude: 825.5 kilometres (512.9 mi)
- Apogee altitude: 835.0 kilometres (518.8 mi)
- Inclination: 98.5 degrees
- Period: 101.4 minutes

Meteor-M No.2 (also known as Meteor M2) was the second Russian Meteor-M series of polar-orbit weather satellite. It was launched on a Soyuz-2.1b rocket with a Fregat upper stage on 8 July 2014. It was designed to operate for 5 years.

Meteor M2 had several problems during its operational life, beginning with a micrometeoroid impact on 18 December 2019, causing issues with its power system. The satellite began having issues orienting itself towards the surface of the earth, and the LRPT transmission system failed on 24 December 2022 It recovered with help from ground engineers, but it later reverted back to its original position and failed to stabilize. At the same time, X-band receiving stations around the globe reported signal degradation, which indicated that the satellite was also having problems controlling its attitude.

In January of 2023, Meteor M2 suffered a serious altitude control system failure, rendering its earth observation equipment unusable, however, the space weather instruments remained usable, but they were no longer considered operational and accurate for use in forecasting.

In 2024, the Russian state corporation that built the satellite, VNIIEM, announced that they would no longer support Meteor M2's HRPT logistics, rendering the satellite essentially inoperative.

It was formally declared as End-of-Life on 1 June 2024.

== See also ==
- Meteor
