= Meteor-M No.2-1 =

Russian space satellite

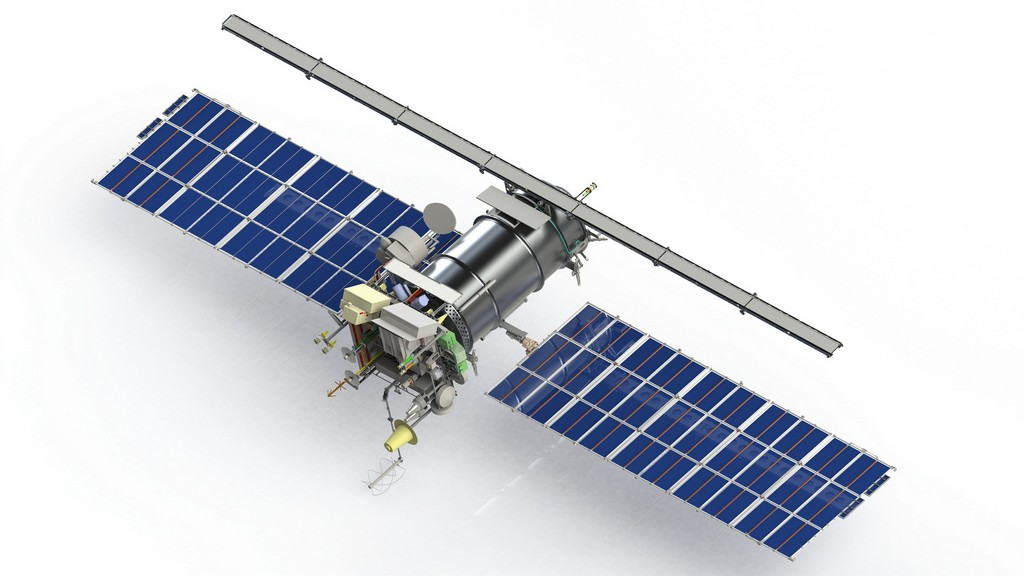
- Mission type: Weather
- Operator: Roscosmos/Roshydromet

Spacecraft properties
- Manufacturer: VNIIEM
- Payload mass: 2,700 kg

Start of mission
- Launch date: 28 November 2017 UTC
- Rocket: Soyuz-2.1b/Fregat
- Launch site: Vostochny 1S

End of mission
- Disposal: Failed launch
- Deactivated: 28 November 2017 UTC

Orbital parameters
- Reference system: Geocentric
- Regime: Sun-synchronous

Meteor-M No.2-1 (Russian: Метеор-М №2-1), was a Russian satellite, part of Meteor-M series of polar-orbit weather satellite. It was launched using Soyuz-2.1b rocket with a Fregat upper stage on 28 November 2017; the satellite failed to separate from the Fregat and communication was later lost.

The cause of failure was determined to be faulty programming. The satellite was programmed with a launch point of Baikonur Cosmodrome, instead of the Vostochny Cosmodrome causing the satellite to enter an incorrect orbit. This was the second launch from the Vostochny Cosmodrome, the first civilian launch site in Russia.

In addition to the ₽2.6bn Meteor-M weather satellite, 18 other scientific, research and commercial satellites from Russia, Norway, Sweden, the US, Japan, Canada and Germany were lost as well.
