= Kosmos 14 =

Soviet experimental weather satellite

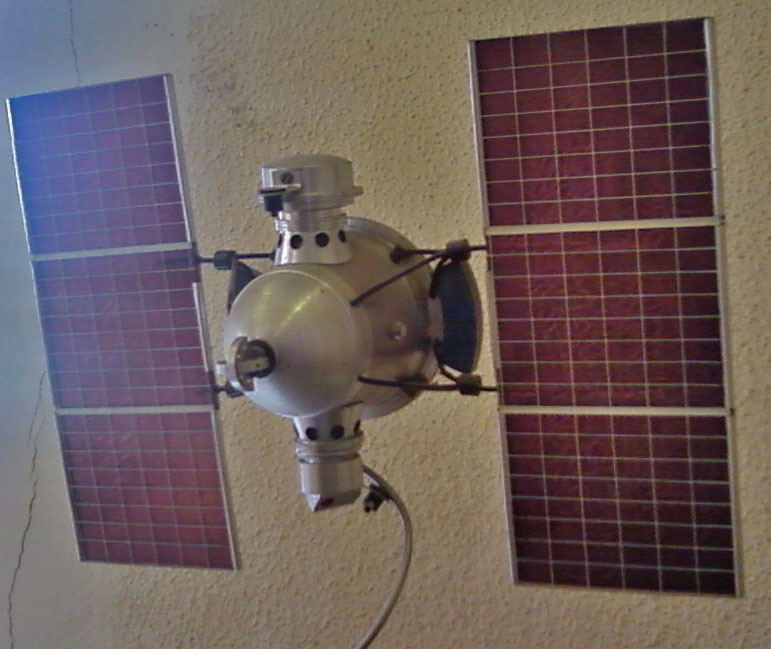
- A model of the Kosmos 14 satellite.
- Mission type: Technology (Weather)
- Operator: VNIIEM
- COSPAR ID: 1963-010A
- SATCAT no.: 00567
- Mission duration: 138 days

Spacecraft properties
- Spacecraft type: Omega
- Manufacturer: Yuzhnoye
- Launch mass: 500 kg
- Dimensions: 1.8 m of long 1.2 m in diameter

Start of mission
- Launch date: 13 April 1963, 11:02:00 GMT
- Rocket: Kosmos-2I 63S1
- Launch site: Kapustin Yar, Mayak-2
- Contractor: Yuzhnoye

End of mission
- Decay date: 29 August 1963

Orbital parameters
- Reference system: Geocentric
- Regime: Low Earth
- Perigee altitude: 253 km
- Apogee altitude: 435 km
- Inclination: 48.88°
- Period: 91.3 minutes
- Epoch: 13 April 1963

Kosmos 14 (Russian: Космос 14 meaning Cosmos 14), also known as Omega No.1, was a satellite which was launched by the Soviet Union in 1963. It was an Omega satellite, derived from the Dnepropetrovsk Sputnik series.

== Spacecraft ==
It was a 500 kilograms (1,100 lb) spacecraft, which was built by the Yuzhnoye Design Office, and was used by VNIIEM to conduct experiments with the use of gyroscopes to control spacecraft. Kosmos 14 was the first Soviet experimental weather satellite. The satellite was originally considered to have been orbiting for the purpose of conducting various geophysical studies. However, nearly 4.5 years after its launch, it was specifically identified as a test platform for electrotechnical systems later used to ensure the orientation and stabilization of weather satellites. In addition, tests were made of power supplies using solar cell batteries. The satellite was in the form of a cylinder, with two hemispherical ends, and was 1.8 metres (5 ft 11 in) long and 1.2 metres (3 ft 11 in) in diameter. The control stabilisation system consisted of flywheels driven by electric motors. The kinetic energy of the flywheels was dampened by using electromagnets that produced torque by interacting with the Earth's magnetic field. This system provided three-axis stabilisation and oriented the satellite to Earth. Equipment on board monitored the operation of automatic devices that controlled the solar and chemical batteries. The satellite communicated via a "Mayak" radio transmitter operating at a frequency of 20 MHz. The results of these tests were incorporated in the Kosmos 122 and subsequent launches in the Meteor system. A similar test flight will be made nearly 8 months later with Kosmos 23. These two flights comprised the first stage in the development of Soviet weather satellites.

== Mission ==
Kosmos 14 was launched from Mayak-2 at Kapustin Yar, aboard a Kosmos-2I 63S1 carrier rocket. The launch occurred at 11:02:00 GMT on 13 April 1963, and resulted in the successful insertion of the satellite into a low Earth orbit. Upon reaching orbit, the satellite was assigned its Kosmos designation, and received the International Designator 1963-010A. The North American Air Defense Command assigned it the catalogue number 00567.

Kosmos 14 was the first of two Omega satellites to be launched, the other being Kosmos 23. It was operated in an orbit with a perigee of 253 kilometres (157 mi), an apogee of 435 kilometres (270 mi), an inclination of 48.88°, and an orbital period of 91.3 minutes. It remained in orbit until it decayed and reentered the atmosphere on 29 August 1963 after 138 days in orbit.

== See also ==
- 1963 in spaceflight
