= Elektro–L =

Russian meteorological satellites

Elektro-L
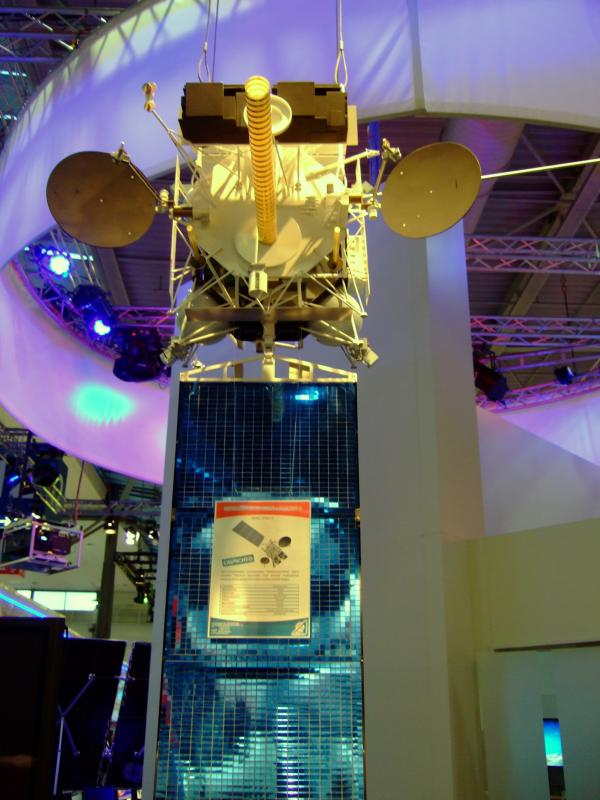
- Elektro-L model at CeBIT 2011
- Manufacturer: NPO Lavochkin
- Country of origin: Russia
- Operator: Roskosmos
- Applications: Weather

Specifications
- Bus: Navigator
- Launch mass: 1,764 kilograms (3,889 lb)
- Power: 1,800 W
- Regime: GEO
- Design life: 10 years

Production
- Status: In Production
- Built: 5
- Launched: 5
- Operational: 4
- Maiden launch: January 2, 2011

Elektro–L (Russian: Электро-Л) is a series of meteorological satellites developed for the Russian Federal Space Agency by NPO Lavochkin. The first satellite, Elektro-L No.1, was launched on 2 January 2011. It is the first Russian weather satellite that successfully operates in geostationary orbit, and is currently the second operational Russian weather satellite. The satellites have a mass of about 1620 kg and are designed to operate for 10 years each. They are capable of producing images of the Earth's whole hemisphere in both visible and infrared frequencies, providing data for climate change and ocean monitoring in addition to their primary weather forecasting role.

== Development ==
Elektro–L was developed by the company NPO Lavochkin and financed from the Russian Federal Space Program 2006–2015. The satellites will be operated by and provide data for Roscosmos, Scientific Research Center of Space Hydrometeorology "Planeta" and for the Federal Service for Hydrometeorology and Environmental Monitoring of Russia (Roshydromet). Elektro–L's predecessor was the Elektro 1 satellite which was launched in 1994. Like Elektro–L, it was also designed to operate in geostationary orbit, but never became fully operational.

Along with the earlier Meteor-M series, Elekto–L satellites are part of Russia's aim to restore its weather satellite network. Before the launch of Elektro–L No.1, Russia had only one operational weather satellite in orbit: Meteor-M No.1, operating in an 830-km circular Sun-synchronous orbit. Due to lack of satellites, Russia is forced to use meteorological data provided by American and European meteorological services. Aerospace journalist Anatoly Zak wrote that the launch of the first Elektro–L satellite marked the "re-emergence of Russia's space industry after two decades of economic turmoil", as the spacecraft and its standardised Navigator platform were both conceived and developed after the disintegration of the Soviet Union.

== Purpose ==
The Elektro–L satellites are capable of providing weather analysis and forecasting both for the territory of Russia and worldwide. The satellites are able to image the entire hemisphere of Earth in visible and infrared frequencies, additionally providing data on climate change, as well as sea and ocean monitoring. An Elektro–L satellite can also be used to receive and relay COSPAS-SARSAT emergency signals. The addition of Elektro–L No.1 to Russia's weather satellite network is expected to make Russian weather forecasts more precise.

== Spacecraft ==
The satellites have a mass of about 1620 kg, with the payload mass being 435 kg. Their operational lifetime is expected to be 10 years. The mean power consumption of the spacecraft is 700 W, which is satisfied by solar panels providing 1.7 kW of power. Elektro–L has a modular design, consisting of a payload and a service module. The service module, called Navigator and developed by NPO Lavochkin, is a standardised platform which will also serve as the basis for future Russian satellites, including for space telescope Spektr-R.

The spacecraft's MSU-GS imaging system is able to provide a resolution of 1 km per pixel for the two visible bands and 4 km for eight infrared bands (ranging from 800 nm to 11,500 nm). They will normally take images every 30 minutes, but in case of emergencies, the interval can be shortened to 10 minutes. The camera is an optical-mechanical scanner, sampling the visible bands at 12,576 pixels per line.

Sensor data downlink to Ground Acquisition and Distribution Center uses a X-band (7.5 GHz) frequency and has a data rate of 2.56-15.36 Mbits per second, while exchange of data between regional centers in X-band (at 8.2 and 7.5 GHz) offers data rates of up to 15.36 Mbit/s.

== Launches ==
=== Elektro-L No.1 ===
The first spacecraft of the series, Elektro-L No.1, was launched at 15.29 Moscow Time (12:29 GMT) on 20 January 2011 from Pad 45 at Baikonur Cosmodrome. The launch vehicle used was a Zenit-2SB, developed by the Ukrainian Yuzhnoe Design Bureau. The rocket's third stage was a newly developed Fregat-SB, a variation of the baseline Fregat, developed by Russia's NPO Lavochkin. At 15.37, the second stage separated and the Fregat-SB continued lifting the spacecraft into geostationary orbit. The satellite separated from the upper stage at 00.28 on 21 January. On 21 January, Roscosmos announced that the spacecraft was fully operational. "We have completed the first series of the testing. The spacecraft is fully operational", Deputy Head Anatoly Shilov said. The satellite's final orbital position in geostationary orbit is 159.1 degrees east longitude.

=== Elektro-L No.2 ===
The next satellite in the series, Elektro-L No.2, initially slated for launch in 2013, was launched from Baikonur Cosmodrome on 11 December 2015 at 13:45 UTC. The launch vehicle was a Zenit-3F with Fregat-SB upper stage. It was the rocket's 83rd and possibly last flight.

=== Elektro-L No.3 ===
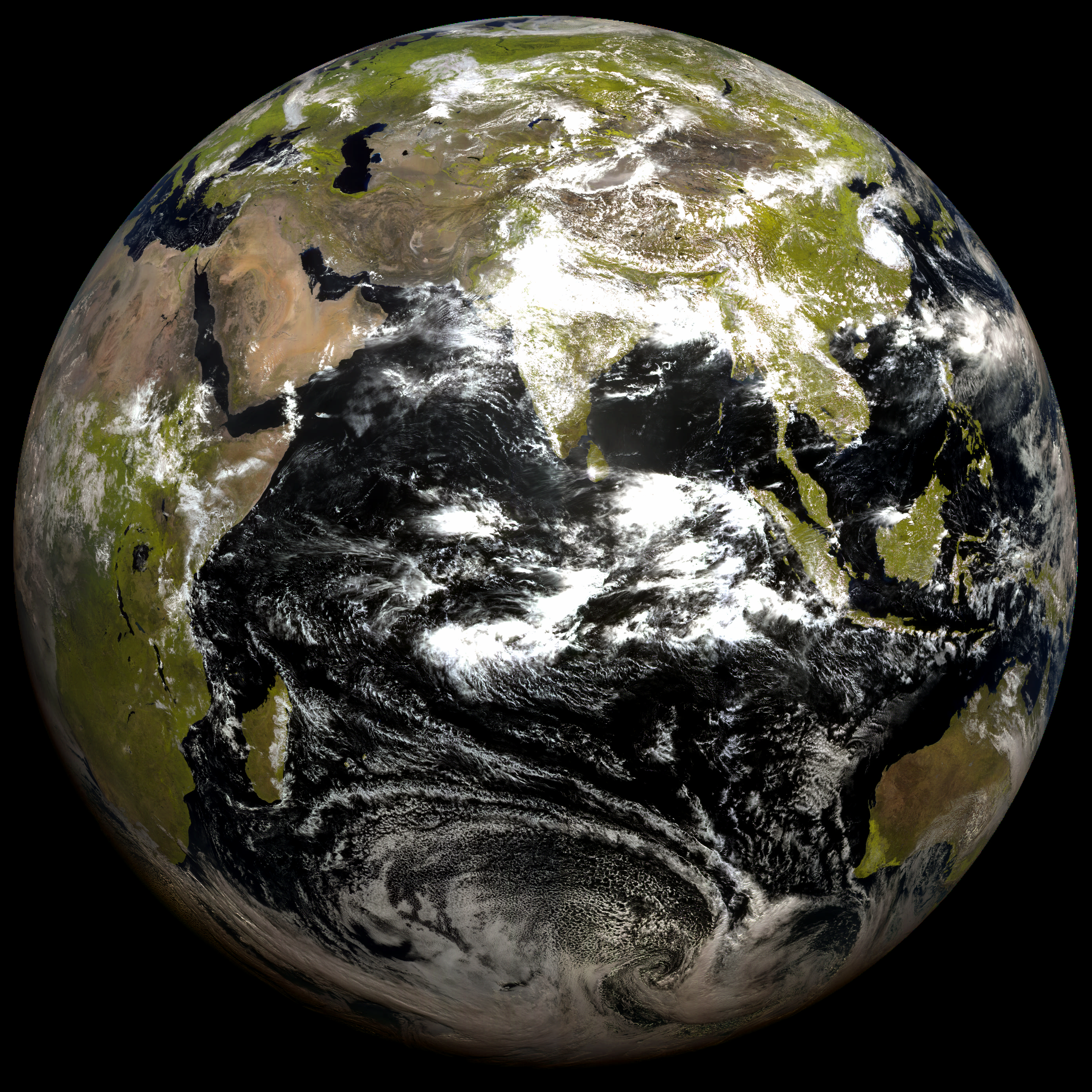
Image from Elektro-L No.3, 2025

The third satellite in the series Elektro-L No.3, was launched from Baikonur Cosmodrome on 24 December 2019 at 12:03 UTC by a Proton-M rocket. This satellite's orbit can be tracked at uphere.space

=== Elektro-L No.4 ===
The fourth satellite in the series Elektro-L No.4, was launched from Baikonur Cosmodrome on 5 February 2023 at 09:12 UTC by a Proton-M rocket.

=== Elektro-L No.5 ===
The fifth satellite in the series Elektro-L No.5, was launched from Baikonur Cosmodrome on 12 February 2026 at 08:52 UTC by a Proton-M rocket. This launch marks also the last use of the Blok DM-03 upper stage for the Proton-M rockets. Blok DM-03 will in the future be solely used by the Angara-5 rockets.
