= Meteor-M No.2-4 =

Weather satellite

Meteor-M №2-4
- Mission type: Meteorological Satellite
- Operator: Roscosmos
- COSPAR ID: 2024-039A

Spacecraft properties
- Spacecraft type: Meteor-M No.2
- Manufacturer: Roscosmos
- Launch mass: 2,900kg
- Dry mass: 2,700kg
- Power: 2000 watts

Start of mission
- Launch date: Feb 29, 2024, 05:43:26 UTC
- Rocket: Soyuz 2.1b/Fregat-M
- Launch site: Site 1S, Vostochny Cosmodrome

Orbital parameters
- Regime: Sun-Synchronous Orbit
- Altitude: 820.7km

Meteor-M №2-4 (alternatively, Meteor-M number 2-4) is a Russian meteorological satellite which is part of the Meteor-M No.2 series of satellites that are designed to replace the old Meteor-3M series of satellites. The missions' primary tasks include environmental monitoring, surveillance of solar activity near the Earth, studying the interactions of the ocean and atmosphere, and exploring Earth's geology. The satellite also features a COSPAS-SARSAT search and rescue system. It was successfully launched on 29 February 2024 on a Soyuz-2.1b launch vehicle from the Vostochny Cosmodrome.

== Instruments ==
Name	Details
IFKS-2	Advanced IR sounder
KMSS	Multi-channel scanning unit
MSU-MR	Low-resolution multispectral scanner
MTVZA-GR	Imager/sounder for atmospheric study
SSPD	Data collection and transmission system.
IKOR-M	Broadband radiometer sensing outgoing shortwave signals.
GGAK-M/RIMS-M	Mass spectrometer to study the ionosphere and upper atmosphere.
GGAK-E/SKIF-6	Spectrometer to detect corpuscular radiation and solar radiation.
GGAK-E/GALS-E	Cosmic rays detector to study corpuscular radiation arriving at Earth.
MeteoSAR	Synthetic aperture X-band radar to study the weather.

== Relevance for amateur radio hobbyists ==
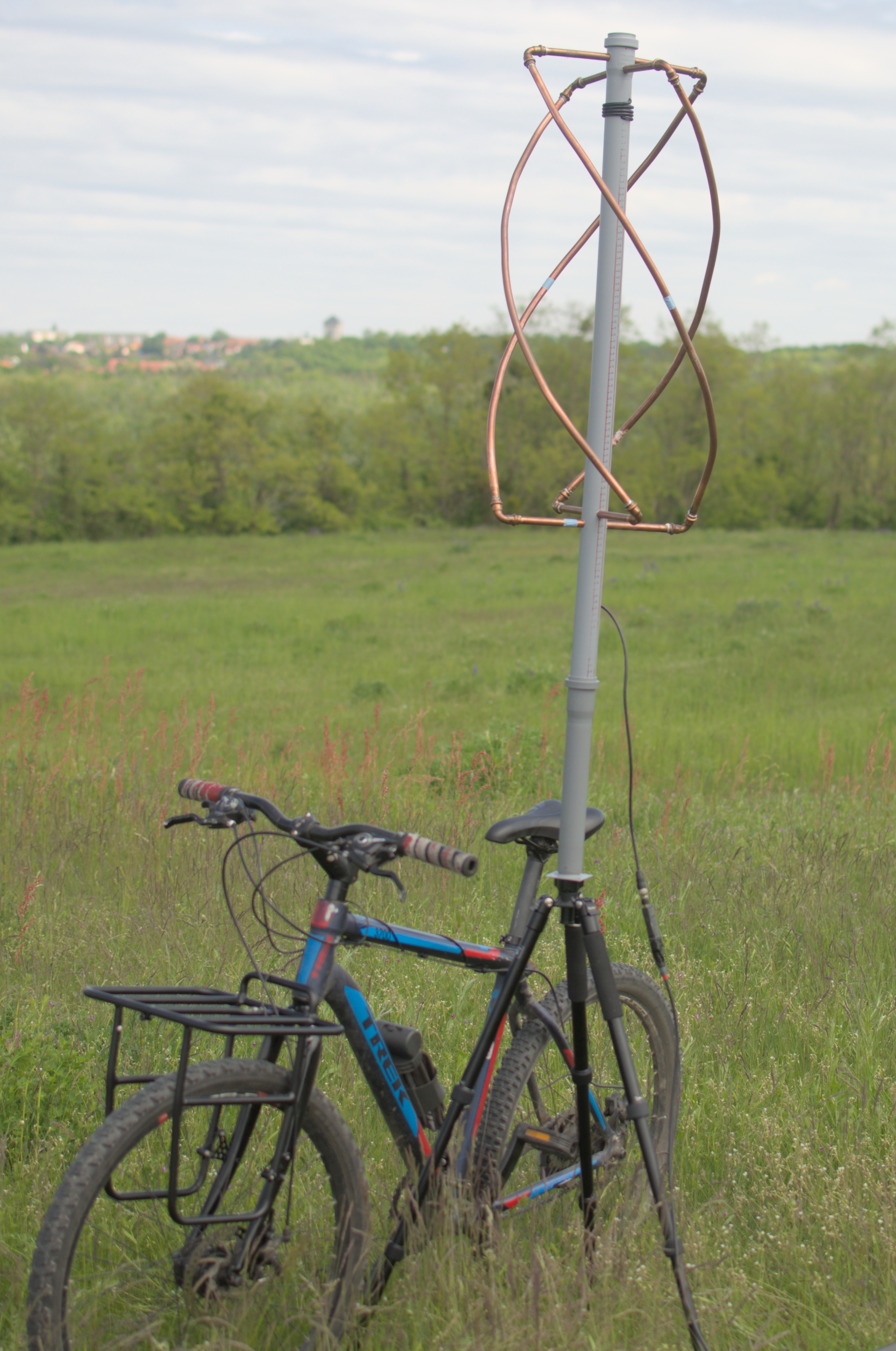
An amateur radio station with a right-hand circularly polarized Helical antenna receiving LRPT data from Meteor-M No.2-4 on VHF

The satellite continuously transmits sensor data and images of the Earth. Some of these transmissions are unencrypted and can be received using inexpensive equipment. Amateur radio operators and other radio hobbyists regularly receive pictures of the Earth transmitted using Low-rate picture transmission at 137.9 MHz or High-resolution picture transmission at 1705 MHz.

Received data packets can be decoded using Free software, such as SatDump.
