= Meteor-M No.2-3 =

Russian weather satellite

- Mission type: Meteorological Satellite
- Operator: Roscosmos
- COSPAR ID: 2023-091A
- SATCAT no.: 57166

Spacecraft properties
- Spacecraft type: Meteor-M No.2
- Manufacturer: Roscosmos
- Launch mass: 2900kg
- Dry mass: 2750kg
- Power: 2000 watts

Start of mission
- Launch date: 27 Jun 2023, 11:34:39 UTC
- Rocket: Soyuz 2.1b/Fregat-M
- Launch site: Site 1S, Vostochny Cosmodrome

Orbital parameters
- Regime: Sun-Synchronous Orbit
- Altitude: 832 km
- Inclination: 98.57° toward the Equator

The Meteor-M No.2-3 is a weather satellite, designed, built and operated by the Roscosmos, Russia's state-owned space corporation. The satellite was launched in 2023, on board a Soyuz-2-1b launch vehicle, equipped with a Fregat-M upper stage. It is the 5th flight of the Meteor-M series, and the 6th of the Meteor-3M program; the satellite has an expected service life of five years or more.

Like its predecessors, Meteor-M No.2-3 was built to watch global weather, record characteristics of the Ozone Layer, measure temperatures of the earth's oceans and track icing conditions in the polar regions to facilitate shipping.

MSU-MR image received from Meteor-M No.2-3 by a hobbyist showing the east coast of the United States.

== Relevance for hobbyists ==
As with the other Meteor satellites, Meteor-M No.2-3 transmits a continuous feed of both LRPT and HRPT imagery as well as some sensor data, and most transmissions are unencrypted and free, and can be received by anyone with basic, inexpensive equipment, such as an SDR and a basic dipole (also widely known as Rabbit-Ears) TV antenna.
