= Kosmos 23 =

Soviet test platform satellite

- Mission type: Technology (Weather)
- Operator: VNIIEM
- COSPAR ID: 1963-050A
- SATCAT no.: 00707
- Mission duration: 105 days

Spacecraft properties
- Spacecraft type: Omega
- Manufacturer: Yuzhnoye
- Launch mass: 347 kg
- Dimensions: 1.8 m long and 1.2 m in diameter

Start of mission
- Launch date: 13 December 1963; 13:55:00 GMT
- Rocket: Kosmos-2I 63S1
- Launch site: Kapustin Yar, Mayak-2
- Contractor: Yuzhnoye

End of mission
- Decay date: 27 March 1964

Orbital parameters
- Reference system: Geocentric
- Regime: Low Earth
- Perigee altitude: 241 km
- Apogee altitude: 540 km
- Inclination: 48.98°
- Period: 92.3 minutes
- Epoch: 13 December 1963

Kosmos 23 (Russian: Космос 23 meaning Cosmos 23), also known as Omega No.2, was a satellite which was launched by the Soviet Union in 1963. It was an Omega satellite, derived from the Dnepropetrovsk Sputnik series. It was a 347 kilograms (765 lb) spacecraft, which was built by the Yuzhnoye Design Office, and was used to conduct experiments with the use of gyroscopes to control spacecraft, for VNIIEM.

== Spacecraft ==
Kosmos 23 was a test platform orbited by the Soviet Union for the purpose of evaluating electrotechnical systems later used to ensure the orientation and stabilization of weather satellites. Like its predecessor, Kosmos 14, the satellite was in the form of a cylinder, with two hemispherical ends, and was 1.8 metres (5 ft 11 in) long and 1.2 metres (3 ft 11 in) in diameter. Tests were made of power supplies that used solar cell batteries, and equipment on board monitored the operation of automatic devices that controlled the solar and chemical batteries. The control stabilization system consisted of flywheels driven by electric motors. The kinetic energy of the flywheels was dampened by using electromagnets that produced torque by interacting with the Earth's magnetic field. This system provided three-axis stabilization and oriented the satellite to Earth. The satellite communicated via a "Mayak" radio transmitter operating at 20 MHz. Kosmos 23 may have also carried the first Soviet meteorological scanning infrared radiometer to obtain crude nighttime pictures of the cloud cover of the Earth. The results of these tests and similar ones conducted 8 months earlier on Kosmos 14 were incorporated in Kosmos 122 and subsequent launches in the "Meteor" system. These two flights comprised the first stage in the development of Soviet weather satellites.

== Launch ==
Kosmos 23 was launched from Mayak-2 at Kapustin Yar, aboard a Kosmos-2I 63S1 carrier rocket. The launch occurred at 13:55 GMT on 13 December 1963, and resulted in the successful insertion of the satellite into a low Earth orbit. Upon reaching orbit, the satellite was assigned its Kosmos designation, and received the International Designator 1963-050A. The North American Air Defense Command assigned it the catalogue number 00707.

== Mission ==
Kosmos 23 was the second of two Omega satellites to be launched, after Kosmos 14. It was operated in an orbit with a perigee of 241 kilometres (150 mi), an apogee of 540 kilometres (340 mi), an inclination, and an orbital period of 92.3 minutes. It remained in orbit until it decayed and reentered the atmosphere on 27 March 1964.

== See also ==
- 1963 in spaceflight
