= Andronik Iosifyan =

Soviet aerospace engineer

- Андроник Иосифьян; Անդրանիկ Իոսիֆյան
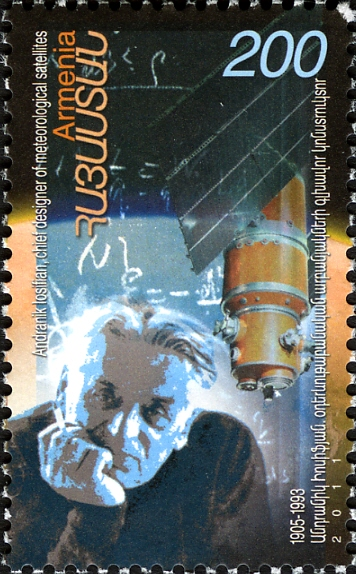
- Andronik Iosifyan on a 2011 Armenian stamp
- Born: 21 July 1905; Tsmakahogh, Nagorno Karabakh
- Died: 13 April 1993 (aged 87); Moscow, Russia
- Citizenship: Soviet Union
- Known for: Chief electrician of R-7 Semyorka and Soyuz spacecraft
- Awards: Hero of Socialist Labour (1961)
- Scientific career
- Fields: Engineering (Electronics)
- Workplaces: All-Union Scientific Research Institute of Electromechanics (VNIIEM)

Andronik Gevondovich Iosifyan (Russian: Андроник Гевондович Иосифьян, Armenian: Անդրանիկ Իոսիֆյան; born 21 July 1905 in Tsmakahogh, Nagorno Karabakh, died 13 April 1993 in Moscow, Russia) was a Soviet engineer of Armenian ethnicity in the field of electronics and later moving towards working on aeronautics.

He is known as one of the founders of Soviet missilery and cosmonautics, the chief constructor of the first Soviet Meteor weather satellites, and the father of electromechanics in USSR. Iosifyan is the founder and the first director of the All-Union Scientific Research Institute of Electromechanics (VNIIEM) – the USSR's largest scientific research institute of electromechanics.

Being one of the most outstanding figures in the field of military and rocket production, Andronik Iosifyan for about thirty years was the USSR's classified chief constructor of electrical equipment of ballistic rockets, nuclear submarines and spacecraft, including the R-7 Semyorka by Sergei Korolev and the Vostok spacecraft. One of Iosifyan's most important inventions, noncontact synchronized transmissions, considered a revolution in technology.

Under the leadership of Iosifyan, practically the entire electrical part of the Soyuz spacecraft, automatic transport cargo ships of the Progress spacecraft and Salyut and Mir space stations were developed.

Sergei Korolev called him the "chief electrician" of missile technology.
