= Meteor-M No.1 =

Russian weather satellite (2009–2014)

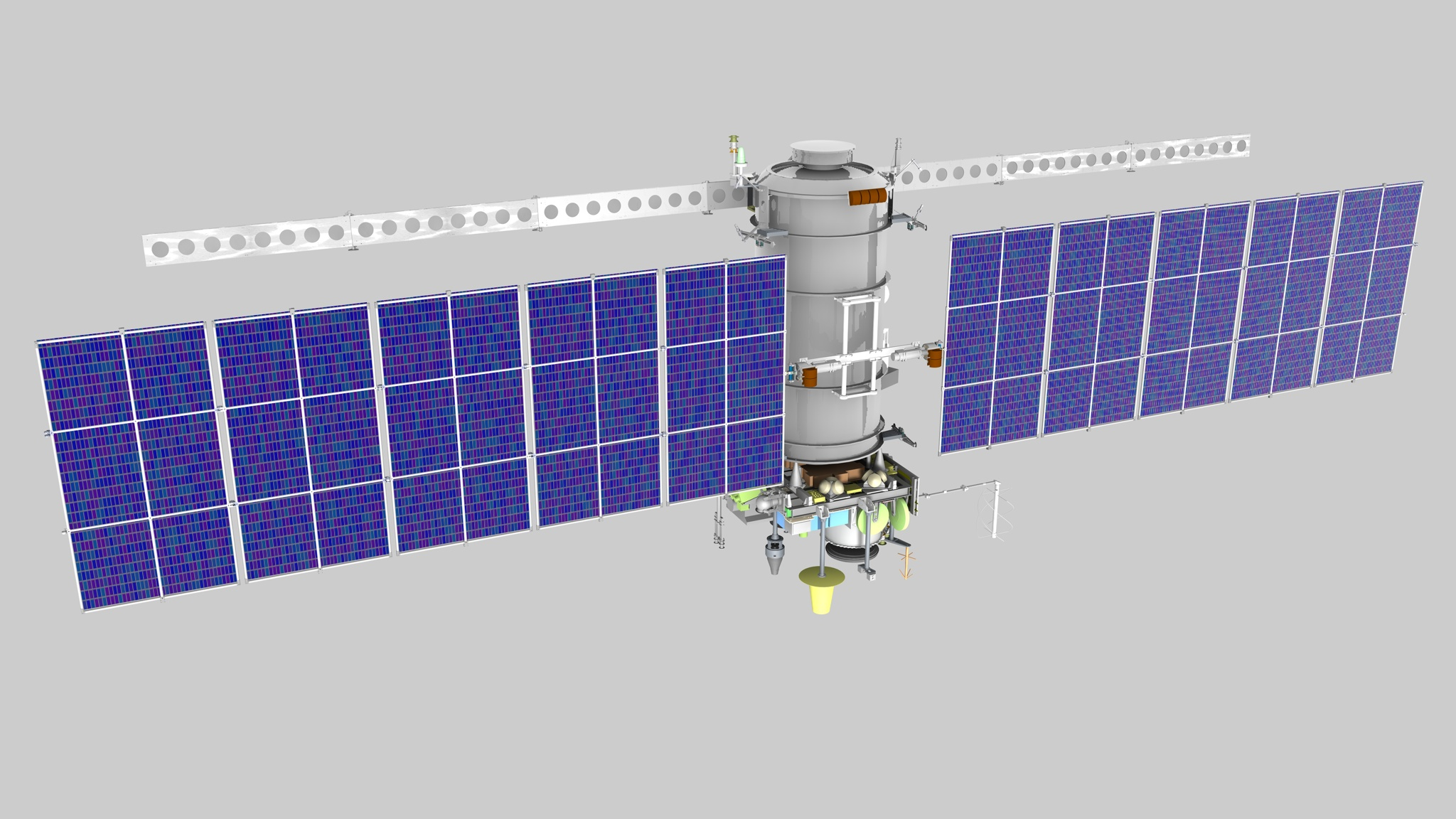
- Mission type: Weather
- Operator: Roscosmos/Roshydromet
- COSPAR ID: 2009-049A
- SATCAT no.: 35865
- Mission duration: Planned: 5 years Actual: 5 years, 2 months

Spacecraft properties
- Manufacturer: VNIIEM
- Launch mass: 2,930 kilograms (6,460 lb)
- Payload mass: 700 kilograms (1,500 lb)
- Power: 1400 watts

Start of mission
- Launch date: 17 September 2009 15:55:07 UTC
- Rocket: Soyuz-2.1b/Fregat
- Launch site: Baikonur Site 31/6

End of mission
- Last contact: November 2014

Orbital parameters
- Reference system: Geocentric
- Regime: Sun-synchronous
- Perigee altitude: 827.3 kilometres (514.1 mi)
- Apogee altitude: 823.8 kilometres (511.9 mi)
- Inclination: 98.5 degrees
- Period: 101.3 minutes

Meteor-M No.1 was the first of the Russian Meteor-M series of polar-orbiting weather satellites. It was launched on a Soyuz-2.1b rocket with a Fregat upper stage on 17 September 2009. Meteor-M No.1 was the designated replacement for Meteor-3M No.1, and had a design life of 5 years. In November 2014, Russian officials announced the termination of the mission after a failure of the onboard attitude control system.

Since its termination, the satellite has been heard on radio by amateur radio operators, even transmitting pictures of the Earth.

== See also ==
- Meteor
