= Meteor-1 1 =

- Mission type: Weather
- Operator: Soviet Space Program
- COSPAR ID: 1969-029A
- SATCAT no.: 3835
- Mission duration: 1 year, 4 months (operational); 43 years (in orbit)

Spacecraft properties
- Spacecraft type: Meteor
- Manufacturer: VNIIEM
- Launch mass: 2200 kg (4850 lb)

Start of mission
- Launch date: 26 Mar 1969, 07:30 GMT
- Rocket: Vostok-2M (8A92M)
- Launch site: Plesetsk Cosmodrome, Site 41/1

End of mission
- Disposal: Deorbited over Antarctica
- Last contact: July 1970
- Decay date: 26 Mar 2012

Orbital parameters
- Regime: Low Earth
- Periapsis altitude: 713 km
- Apoapsis altitude: 644 km
- Inclination: 81.25°
- Period: 97.9 minutes
- Epoch: 26 Mar 1969

Meteor-1-1 was the Soviet Union's first fully operational weather satellite, and was launched 26 March 1969 at 07:30 GMT on a Vostok rocket. It weighed between 1,200 and 1,400 kilograms, and was originally placed in orbit at an altitude of 650 km. Two solar panels were automatically oriented toward the Sun. It ceased operations in July 1970. Meteor-1-1 was the first of a series of 25 launches of similar spacecraft (model designation Meteor M 11F614) from 1969 to 1977.

The satellite provided near-global observations of the Earth's weather systems, cloud cover, ice and snow fields, and reflected and emitted radiation from the dayside and nightside of the Earth-atmosphere system for operational use by the Soviet meteorological service. Some of the processed data and TV pictures from the satellite were distributed to meteorological centers on the world.

Meteor-1-1 deorbited and fell in Antarctica on 26 March 2012, on the anniversary of its launch 43 years earlier, according to the Russian Defense Ministry. "According to data provided by the Main Center for Space Reconnaissance, which is part of Russia's Space Forces, fragments of the Meteor-1-1 satellite entered the Earth's atmosphere at 02:17 a.m. Moscow time on Tuesday (22:17 GMT Monday 26 March 2012)," according to Space Forces spokesman Col. Alexey Zolotukhin. He also said that the defunct satellite fell in the Queen Maud Land region of Antarctica, about 690 kilometres (430 miles) from Argentinean research station of Belgrano II.

== See also ==
- Meteor
