= Elektro-L No.2 =

Russian geostationary weather satellite

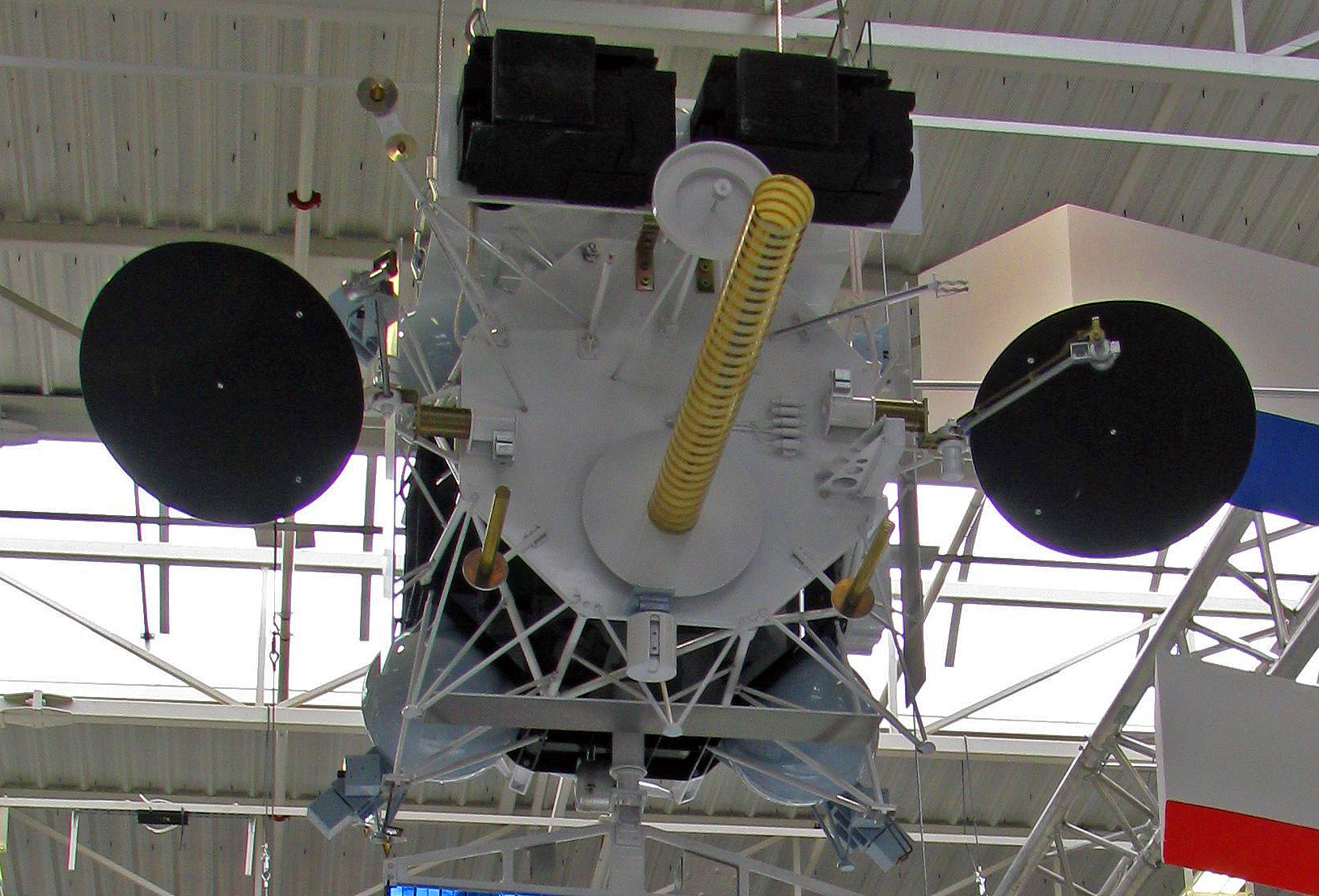
- Mission type: Weather
- Operator: Roskosmos
- COSPAR ID: 2015-074A
- SATCAT no.: 41105

Spacecraft properties
- Bus: Navigator
- Manufacturer: NPO Lavochkin

Start of mission
- Launch date: December 11, 2015; 13:45:33 UTC
- Rocket: Zenit-3F
- Launch site: Baikonur 45/1

Orbital parameters
- Reference system: Geocentric
- Regime: Geostationary

Elektro-L No.2 is a Russian geostationary weather satellite which launched on 11 December 2015. It is the second Elektro-L spacecraft to fly, after Elektro-L No.1 launched in 2011. The Elektro-L No. 2 satellite system was developed by Lavockhin and is part of the second generation of Russian geosynchronous weather satellites. The space platform has an upgrade in star trackers (EADS Sodern SED26) and radio complex. The MSU-GS camera also passed additional tests to improve performance in infrared channels.

== Launch ==
Originally planned for 2014, the launch date was December 11, 2015 at 13:45:33 UTC. The launch was conducted using a Zenit-3F carrier rocket from the Baikonur, site 45/1.
