= Tsmakahogh =

Tsmakahogh / Bazarkend Ծմակահող / Bazarkənd
- St. Stephen's Church (1229) near Tsmakahogh

- Location within Azerbaijan Location within East Zangezur Economic Region
- Coordinates: 40°03′32.4″N 46°35′02.7″E
- Country: Azerbaijan
  - District: Aghdara

Population (2015)
  - Total: 261
- Time zone: UTC+4 (AZT)

Tsmakahogh (Armenian: Ծմակահող) or Bazarkend (Azerbaijani: Bazarkənd) is a village in the Aghdara District of Azerbaijan, in the region of Nagorno-Karabakh. Until 2023 it was controlled by the breakaway Republic of Artsakh. The village had an ethnic Armenian-majority population until the expulsion of the Armenian population of Nagorno-Karabakh by Azerbaijan following the 2023 Azerbaijani offensive in Nagorno-Karabakh.

== History ==
During the Soviet period, the village was a part of the Mardakert District of the Nagorno-Karabakh Autonomous Oblast.

== Historical heritage sites ==
Historical heritage sites in and around the village include a 12th/13th-century cemetery, St. Stephen's Church (Armenian: Սուրբ Ստեփանոս եկեղեցի, romanized: Surb Stepanos Yekeghetsi) built in 1229, and the 13th-century Mamkan Church (Armenian: Մամքան Եկեղեցի).

== Economy and culture ==
The population is mainly engaged in agriculture and animal husbandry. As of 2015, the village has a municipal building, a school, two shops, and a medical centre.

== Demographics ==
The village had 228 inhabitants in 2005, and 261 inhabitants in 2015.

== Notable people ==
- Andronik Iosifyan, Soviet engineer of Armenian ethnicity
