= Automatic picture transmission =

Weather image transmission system

The Automatic Picture Transmission (APT) system is an analog image transmission system developed for use on weather satellites. It was introduced in the 1960s and over four decades has provided image data to relatively low-cost user stations at locations in most countries of the world. A user station anywhere in the world can receive local data at least twice a day from each satellite as it passes nearly overhead.

== Transmission ==
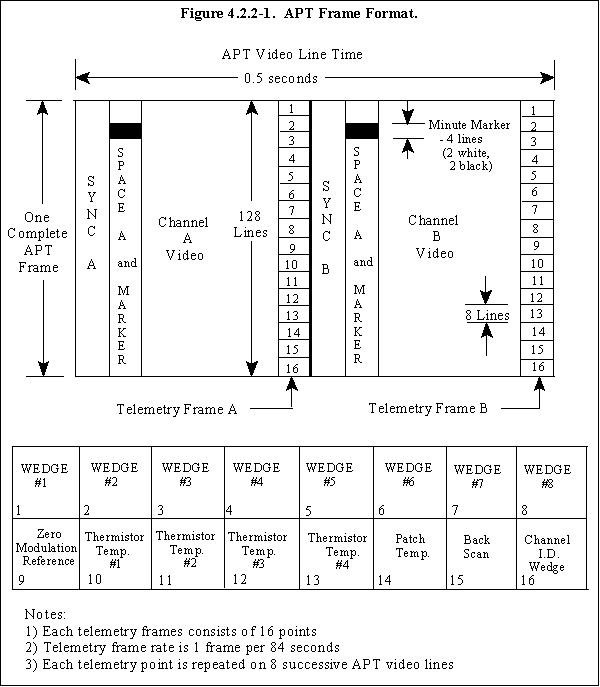
The APT transmission format

=== Structure ===
The broadcast transmission is composed of two image channels, telemetry information, and synchronization data, with the image channels typically referred to as Video A and Video B. All this data is transmitted as a horizontal scan line. A complete line is 2080 pixels long, with each image using 909 pixels and the remainder going to the telemetry and synchronization. Lines are transmitted at 2 per second, which equates to a 4160 words per second, or 4160 baud.

=== Images ===
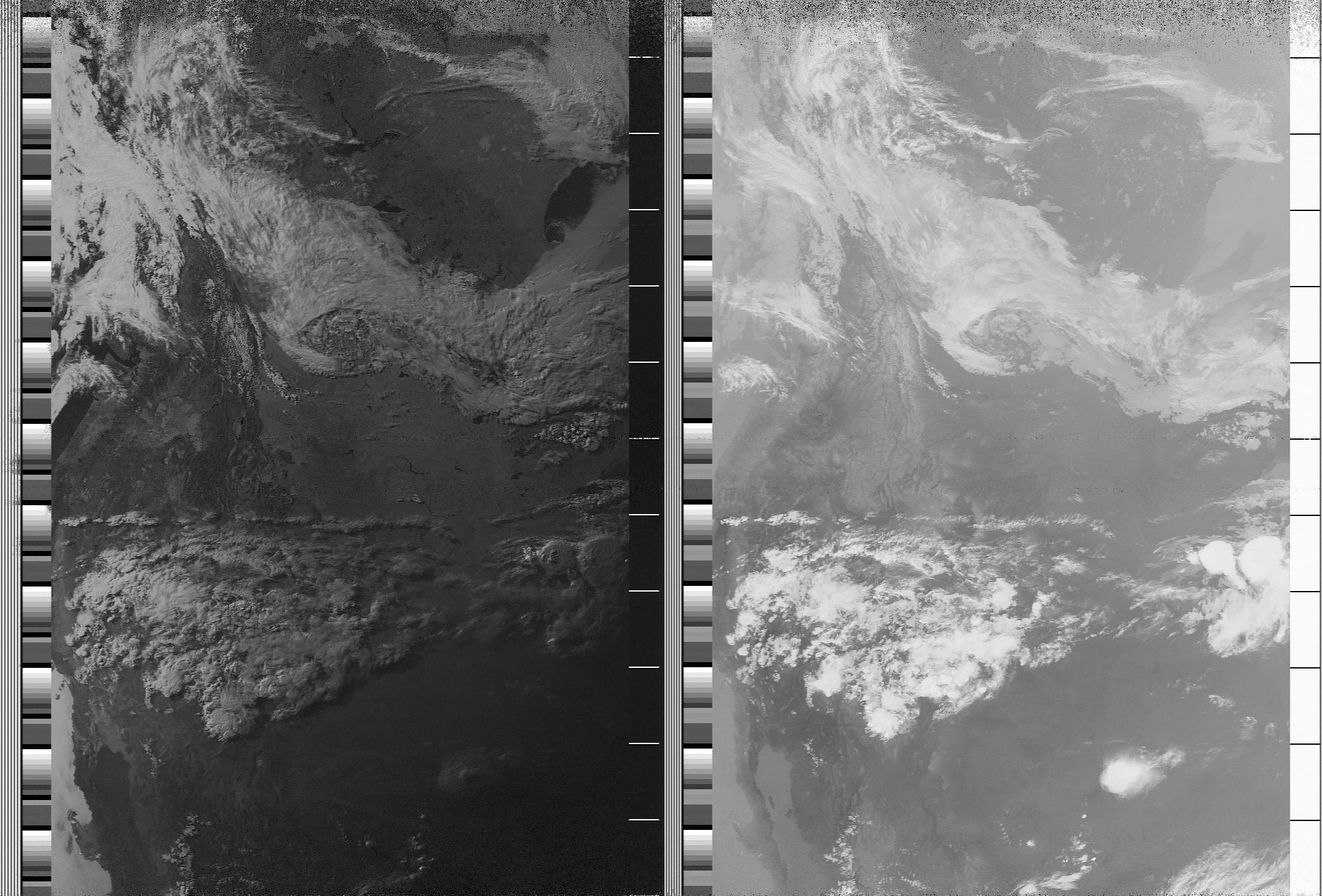
An APT image of western North America in visible and infrared bands

On NOAA POES system satellites, the two images are 4 km / pixel smoothed 8-bit images derived from two channels of the advanced very-high-resolution radiometer (AVHRR) sensor. The images are corrected for nearly constant geometric resolution prior to being broadcast; as such, the images are free of distortion caused by the curvature of the Earth.

Of the two images, one is typically long-wave infrared (10.8 micrometers) with the second switching between near-visible (0.86 micrometers) and mid-wave infrared (3.75 micrometers) depending on whether the ground is illuminated by sunlight. However, NOAA can configure the satellite to transmit any two of the AVHRR's image channels.

=== Synchronization and telemetry ===
Included in the transmission are a series of synchronization pulses, minute markers, and telemetry information.

The synchronization information, transmitted at the start of each video channel, allows the receiving software to align its sampling with the baud rate of the signal, which can vary slightly over time. The minute markers are four lines of alternating black then white lines which repeat every 60 seconds (120 lines).

The telemetry section is composed of sixteen blocks, each 8 lines long, which are used as reference values to decode the image channels. The first eight blocks, called "wedges," begin at 1/8 max intensity and successively increase by 1/8 to full intensity in the eighth wedge, with the ninth being zero intensity. Blocks ten through fifteen each encode a calibration value for the sensor. The sixteenth block identifies which sensor channel was used for the preceding image channel by matching the intensity of one of the wedges one through six. Video channel A typically matches either wedge two or three, channel B matches wedge four.

The first fourteen blocks should be identical for both channels. The sixteen telemetry blocks repeat every 128 lines, and these 128 lines are referred to as a frame.

=== Broadcast signal ===
The signal itself is a 256-level amplitude modulated 2400Hz subcarrier, which is then frequency modulated onto the 137 MHz-band RF carrier. Maximum subcarrier modulation is 87% (±5%), and overall RF bandwidth is 34 kHz. On NOAA POES vehicles, the signal is broadcast at approximately 37dBm (5 watts) effective radiated power.

== Receiving images ==
An APT signal is continuously broadcast, with reception beginning at the start of the next line when the receiver is within radio range. Images can be received in real-time by relatively unsophisticated, inexpensive receivers during the time the satellite is within radio range, which typically lasts 8 to 15 minutes.

As of 2004 there were almost 5,000 APT receiving stations registered with the World Meteorological Organization (WMO). It is unclear what percent of the total user-base this represents, since registration is not a requirement, and was only available after 1996.

=== Software-defined radio ===
A popular device used to receive the APT signals is a Software-defined radio (SDR). Many of these are cheap, and allow reception of frequencies from 500 kHz up to- in some cases- 7 GHz. Open-source software is available to set up the receiver, and since many have Plug and play it makes reception of APT accessible to the non-specialist. A cheap and reliable example is the RTL-SDR v3/v4, as it can reach up to 2.56 MHz in bandwidth which more than adequate for the reception of the APT signals (34 kHz). The SDR can decode on all the modulations, in this case it would be the NFM.

=== Radio receiver ===
The bandwidth required to receive APT transmissions is approximately 9000000000 kHz. Most older scanners (police and fire type receivers) are the standard 15 kHz bandwidth which were designed to support voice transmissions. Newer VHF general coverage receivers are equipped with multiple IF bandpasses; some are, but not limited to: 6 kHz, 15 kHz 50 kHz & 230 kHz(broadcast FM). Use of a receiver with too narrow a bandwidth will produce pictures that are saturated in the blacks and whites, as well as possible inversion. Too wide, and the noise floor of the receiver will be too high to acquire a good picture. For the amateur enthusiast, a computer controller receiver is the best option to allow the software to automatically tune and set the required modes for proper reception. There are also dedicated APT receivers made specifically for computer control and APT reception. Specifically, ICOM PCR1000, PCR1500 & PCR2500 will produce excellent results. Searching on the web for "NOAA APT (RECEPTION or RECEIVER)" will produce a wealth of information on receivers, software, and antennas.

=== Antenna ===
APT images from weather satellites can be received with a right-hand circular polarized, 137 MHz antenna. Normally, there is no need to have the antenna follow the satellite and a fixed position antenna will provide good results.

The three most frequently recommended antennas are the crossed dipole, V dipole antenna or the quadrifilar helix antenna (QHA or QFH).

=== Displaying the images ===
Years ago, to receive APT images, a specialized decoder was required in addition to the receiver to display or print images, much like HF WEFAX (serving the maritime community). Often both receiver and decoder were combined into one unit.

Nowadays, with the advent of personal computers, all that is required is dedicated software such as WXtoIMG (many of which offer "free" versions ) and a sound card. The sound card acquires and digitizes the slow scan video (in the audible range) coming from the speaker, phones, or line-out of the receiver, and then the software will process the various visible and infrared channels of the AVHRR sensor.

==== Enhanced images ====
Since each channel of the AVHRR sensor is sensitive to only one wavelength of light, each of the two images is luminance only, also known as grayscale. However, different materials tend to emit or reflect with a consistent relative intensity. This has enabled the development of software that can apply a color palette to the images which simulates visible light coloring. If the decoding software knows exactly where the satellite was, it can also overlay outlines and boundaries to help in utilizing the resulting images.

== History ==
- Developed by the National Earth Satellite Service
- Tested on TIROS-8, launched December 21, 1963
- Nimbus 1, launched August 28, 1964, was the first application satellite
- First NOAA polar-orbiting vehicle to use it was TIROS-N, launched on October 13, 1978, and it has flown on all NOAA polar-orbiting vehicles since then.
- Also flown on the Soviet METEOR, Sich, Resurs and Okean weather satellites.

== Current status ==
There are currently no satellites that transmit APT. NOAA-15, the last satellite to transmit APT, was decommissioned on August 19, 2025. Previous satellites such as Sich-1 and the METEOR series of satellites operated on APT, but have since reached the end of their operational lifespans.

== Future ==
With improvements in electronics, analog transmission systems have given way to digital transmissions systems. NOAA-19, called NOAA-N' prior to its launch on 6 February 2009, is the last satellite to carry an APT system. The MetOp program, a collaboration between NOAA and EUMETSAT, as well as the Russian METEOR-M program have switched to Low Rate Picture Transmission (LRPT) for their new polar-orbit satellites.

Since the NOAA-20 satellite, most of the NOAA satellites have their lowest transmission frequency at 7812 MHz in the C Band, making reception by the general public impractical since unlike older schemes (APT, LRPT) they require a dish antenna with a specialised antenna feed etc.

== See also ==
- EUMETSAT
- Radiofax
- Weather satellites
