= Elektro-L No.1 =

Weather satellite

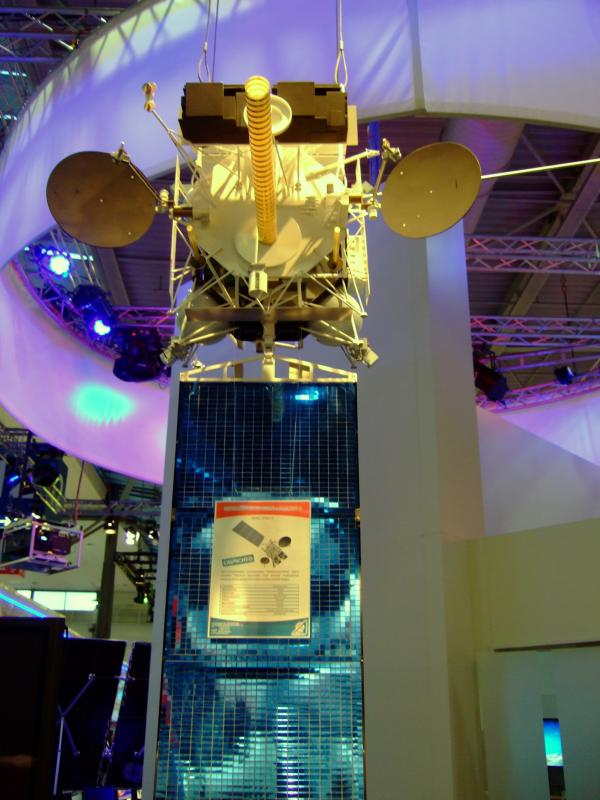
- Mission type: Weather
- Operator: Roskosmos
- COSPAR ID: 2011-001A
- SATCAT no.: 37344
- Mission duration: 15 years and 27 days (in orbit)

Spacecraft properties
- Bus: Navigator
- Manufacturer: NPO Lavochkin
- Launch mass: 1,740 kilograms (3,840 lb)

Start of mission
- Launch date: 20 January 2011, 12:29:02 UTC
- Rocket: Zenit-3F
- Launch site: Baikonur 45/1

Orbital parameters
- Reference system: Geocentric
- Regime: Geostationary
- Longitude: 14.5° West
- Semi-major axis: 42,165.19 kilometres (26,200.23 mi)
- Eccentricity: 7.61E-05
- Perigee altitude: 35,790 kilometres (22,240 mi)
- Apogee altitude: 35,797 kilometres (22,243 mi)
- Inclination: 0.68 degrees
- Period: 1436.17 minutes
- Epoch: 24 January 2015, 03:02:23 UTC

Elektro-L No.1 (Russian: Электро-L), also known as Geostationary Operational Meteorological Satellite No.2 or GOMS No.2, is a Russian geostationary weather satellite which was launched in 2011. The first Elektro-L spacecraft to fly, it became the first Russian geostationary weather satellite to be launched since Elektro No.1 in 1994.

== Spacecraft ==
Elektro-L No.1 is the first of two Elektro-L satellites that were planned to be launched according to plans at the time (as of November 2025, there are 4 Elektro-L satellites launched, and a planned launch on 15 December 2025). It was manufactured by Lavochkin, based on the Navigator satellite bus, and had a mass at launch of 1,740 kilograms (3,840 lb). Designed to operate for ten years, the satellite is positioned over the Indian Ocean at a longitude of 76 degrees east.

The MSU-GS scanner is the primary instrument aboard the spacecraft. It is designed to produce visible light and infrared images of a full disc of the Earth. It can produce an image every half-hour, with the visible light images having a resolution of one kilometre, and the infrared images having a resolution of four kilometres. The satellite also carries GGAK-E, a heliophysics payload designed to study radiation from the Sun. The satellite will also be used to relay data between Russian weather stations, and will also be used to relay signals as part of the Cospas-Sarsat system. It carries seven infrared channels and three visible channels.

== Launch ==
The launch of Elektro–L No.1 took place at 12:29 UTC on 20 January 2011. The Zenit-3F carrier rocket, used to place the satellite into orbit, was making its maiden flight. The rocket consisted of a two-stage Zenit-2SB manufactured by the Ukrainian Yuzhnoye Design Bureau, and an NPO Lavochkin-manufactured Fregat-SB upper stage. The launch was also the maiden flight of the Fregat-SB, which was derived from the Fregat, but equipped with additional propellant tanks. The satellite separated from the upper stage at 21:28 UTC. The Russian Federal Space Agency confirmed the spacecraft was operational the next day.

== Repositioning ==
On July 13, 2016, after the launch of the second Elektro-L satellite, Elektro-L No. 1 began moving from its previous position over the Indian Ocean at 76° East towards a new location at 14.5° West over the Atlantic. To achieve this, the spacecraft was put into an orbit 289 kilometers higher than its previous geostationary orbit. This caused the spacecraft to drift West relative to the Earth at a rate of 2.03° per day. This shift was expected to take 45 days, however on August 24 and August 30, the spacecraft's orbit was lowered to the point where its drift was 0.09° per day. On September 7 that year, a maneuver brought it to a drift of 0.012° per day. Finally on October 3, mission control announced that the craft had come to its position of 14.5° West, and that the transfer had been completed.

== See also ==
- Geostationary Operational Environmental Satellite
- Geostationary Meteorological Satellite
- Meteor (satellite)
- Meteosat
