= Zenit-3F =

Expendable carrier rocket

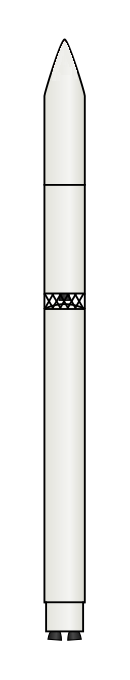
- Function: Carrier rocket
- Manufacturer: Yuzhmash
- Country of origin: Ukraine

Size
- Height: 59.6 m (196 ft)
- Diameter: 3.9 m (13 ft)
- Mass: 471,000 kg (1,038,000 lb)
- Stages: 3

Capacity

Payload to GTO
- Mass: 4,000 kg (8,800 lb)

Associated rockets
- Family: Zenit

Launch history
- Status: Retired
- Launch sites: Baikonur, Site 45/1
- First flight: 20 January 2011 (Elektro-L No.1)
- Last flight: 26 December 2017 (AngoSat 1)

First stage – Zenit-2SB first stage
- Height: 32.9 m (108 ft)
- Diameter: 3.9 m (13 ft)
- Empty mass: 27,564 kg (60,768 lb)
- Gross mass: 354,350 kg (781,210 lb)
- Propellant mass: RG-1: 90,219 kg (198,899 lb); LOX: 236,567 kg (521,541 lb)
- Powered by: 1 × RD-171
- Maximum thrust: SL: 7,257 kN (1,631,000 lb_{f}) vac: 7,908 kN (1,778,000 lb_{f})
- Specific impulse: SL: 309.5 s (3.035 km/s) vac: 337.2 s (3.307 km/s)
- Burn time: 140–150 seconds
- Propellant: LOX/RG-1

Second stage – Zenit-2SB second stage
- Height: 10.4 m (34 ft)
- Diameter: 3.9 m (13 ft)
- Empty mass: 8,307 kg (18,314 lb)
- Gross mass: 90,794 kg (200,167 lb)
- Propellant mass: RG-1: 23,056 kg (50,830 lb); LOX: 59,431 kg (131,023 lb)
- Powered by: 1 × RD-120; 1 × RD-8
- Maximum thrust: RD-120: 912 kN (205,000 lb_{f}); RD-8: 79.4 kN (17,800 lb_{f})
- Specific impulse: RD-120: 350 s (3.4 km/s); RD-8: 342.8 s (3.362 km/s)
- Burn time: 360–370 seconds
- Propellant: LOX / RG-1

Third stage – Fregat-SB
- Powered by: 1 × S5.92
- Maximum thrust: 19.6 kN (4,400 lb_{f})
- Specific impulse: 327 s (3.21 km/s)
- Burn time: 877 seconds
- Propellant: N_{2}O_{4} / UDMH

The Zenit-3F, Zenit-3SLBF or Zenit-2SB/Fregat was an expendable carrier rocket. It was a member of the Zenit family of rockets, which were designed by Yuzhnoye Design Bureau of Ukraine.

== History ==
Launches of Zenit-3SLBF rockets were conducted from Baikonur Cosmodrome Site 45/1. The rocket consisted of a Zenit-2SB (Zenit-2M) core vehicle, with a Fregat-SB upper stage, developed by NPO Lavochkin of Russia, in place of the Block-DM used on the Zenit-3SL and 3SLB.

The first launch of a Zenit-3F took place on 20 January 2011. The payload was an Elektro-L new generation weather satellite. A Zenit-3F was also used to successfully launch the Spektr-R radio astronomy satellite on 18 July 2011.

== Launches ==
Flight No.	Date and time (UTC)	Payload	Orbit	Outcome
1	20 January 2011; 12:29	Elektro-L No.1	GEO	Success
2	18 July 2011; 02:31	Spektr-R	HEO	Success
3	11 December 2015; 13:45	Elektro-L No.2	GEO	Success
4	26 December 2017; 19:00	AngoSat 1	GEO	Success
