= Hydrometeorological Centre of Russia =

National meteorological service in Russia

- Гидрометцентр России
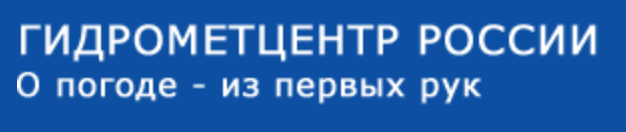

Agency overview
- Formed: 1921
- Jurisdiction: Russia
- Headquarters: Moscow
- Agency executive: Roman Wilfand
- Parent agency: Federal Service for Hydrometeorology and Environmental Monitoring
- Website: www.meteoinfo.ru (in English and Russian)

The Hydrometeorological Centre of Russia (Russian: Гидрометцентр России, Gidrometcentr Rossii) is the national meteorological service in Russia, part of the Federal Service for Hydrometeorology and Environmental Monitoring.

== History ==
It was founded in June 1921 as the Meteorological Service of the Russian Soviet Federative Socialist Republic.

In 1929 it joined the Hydrometeorological Centre of the USSR. In accordance with Government Decree on the establishment of a single hydrometeorological service of January 1, 1930 was organized by the Central Weather Bureau, converted in 1936 into the Central Weather Institute (since 1943 - Central Institute of Forecasting).

In September 1935, the journal "Meteorology and Hydrology" began publication. The creation of the world's first drifting ice station "North Pole" (1937-1938) was of great importance for the further development of the meteorological service.

During the Axis military invasion, some meteorological facilities in the western regions of the USSR were destroyed, but they were restored after the end of the Great Patriotic War. In the mid-1950s, the first Soviet stations were established in Antarctica.

After the creation of the World Weather Information Service in 1963, the Soviet Meteorological Service became one of three world meteorological centers in the World Weather Information Service system.

In 1965, the Central Institute of forecasts and the Joint Centre of the Academy of Sciences and the Main Directorate of Hydrometeorological Service were merged into one institution: Hydrometeorological Research Center of the USSR.

In 1967, this organization was awarded the Order of Lenin. In the late 1960s, the Soviet space meteorological system began to function.

From 1992 it is called Hydrometeorological Centre of Russia. An important event, largely determined the fate of research at the Hydrometeorological Center of Russia, was giving it the Government Decree №1167 of October 14, 1994 the status of the State Scientific Center of Russian Federation. In January 2007, by decision of the Government of Russia, this status has been saved.

== Duties and functions ==
In the system of the World Weather Watch of the World Meteorological Organization (WMO) Hydrometeorological Centre of Russia provides the fulfillment of international obligations of the Russian Federation on the international exchange of information and data forecasting meteorological observations, and functions as:

- World Meteorological Centre (WMC-Moscow);
- Regional Specialized Meteorological Centre in the European region;
- National Centre for weather forecasts.

The main tasks of Russian Hydrometeorological Center are:

- Obtaining new knowledge about the processes of weather in the system "atmosphere-ocean-land".
- Operational support of the country, state and economic structures of hydro-meteorological information, including warnings of adverse weather and dangerous phenomena.

== Literature ==
- С. Л. Белоусов, В. А. Бугаев. Развитие методов метеорологического прогнозирования и Гидрометцентр СССР // журнал «Метеорология и гидрология», 1968, №3.
