= Meteor-M No.2-2 =

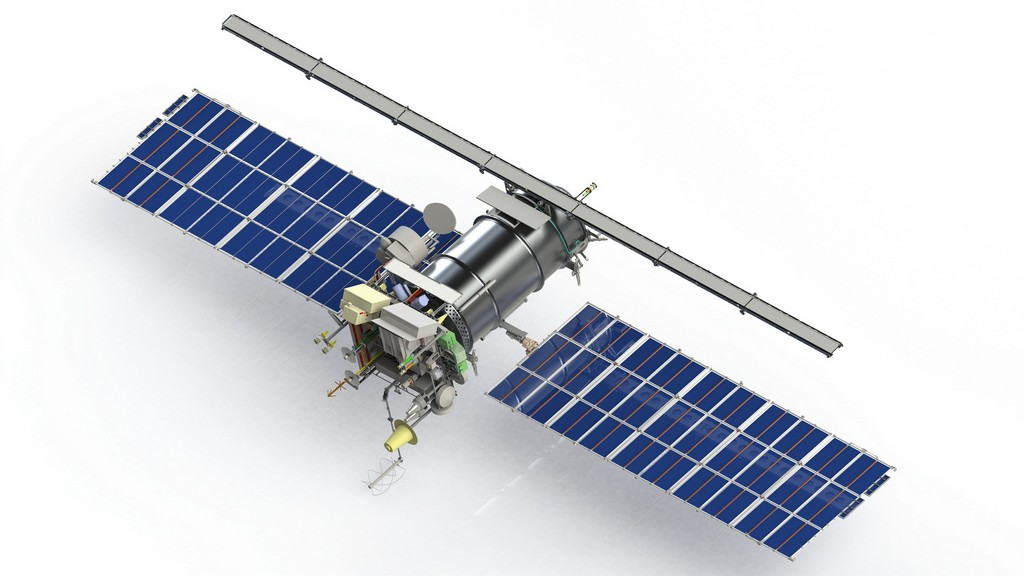
- The meteor-m2 spacecraft.
- Operator: Roscosmos
- SATCAT no.: 44387
- Mission duration: 5 years, 5 months, 7 days

Spacecraft properties
- Payload mass: 1,250 kilograms

Start of mission
- Launch date: July 5, 2019,08:41:45 UTC
- Rocket: soyuz 2.1b

Orbital parameters
- Altitude: 832 km
- Inclination: 98.77
- Period: 101 minutes

Meteor-M No.2-2 was the forth Russian Meteor-M series of polar orbiting weather satellite It was launched on a Soyuz-2-1b with a Fregat upperstage on July 5th 2019. On December 18th 2019 it was hit by a Micrometeorite causing depressurization.
