= Fregat =

Russian upper rocket stage

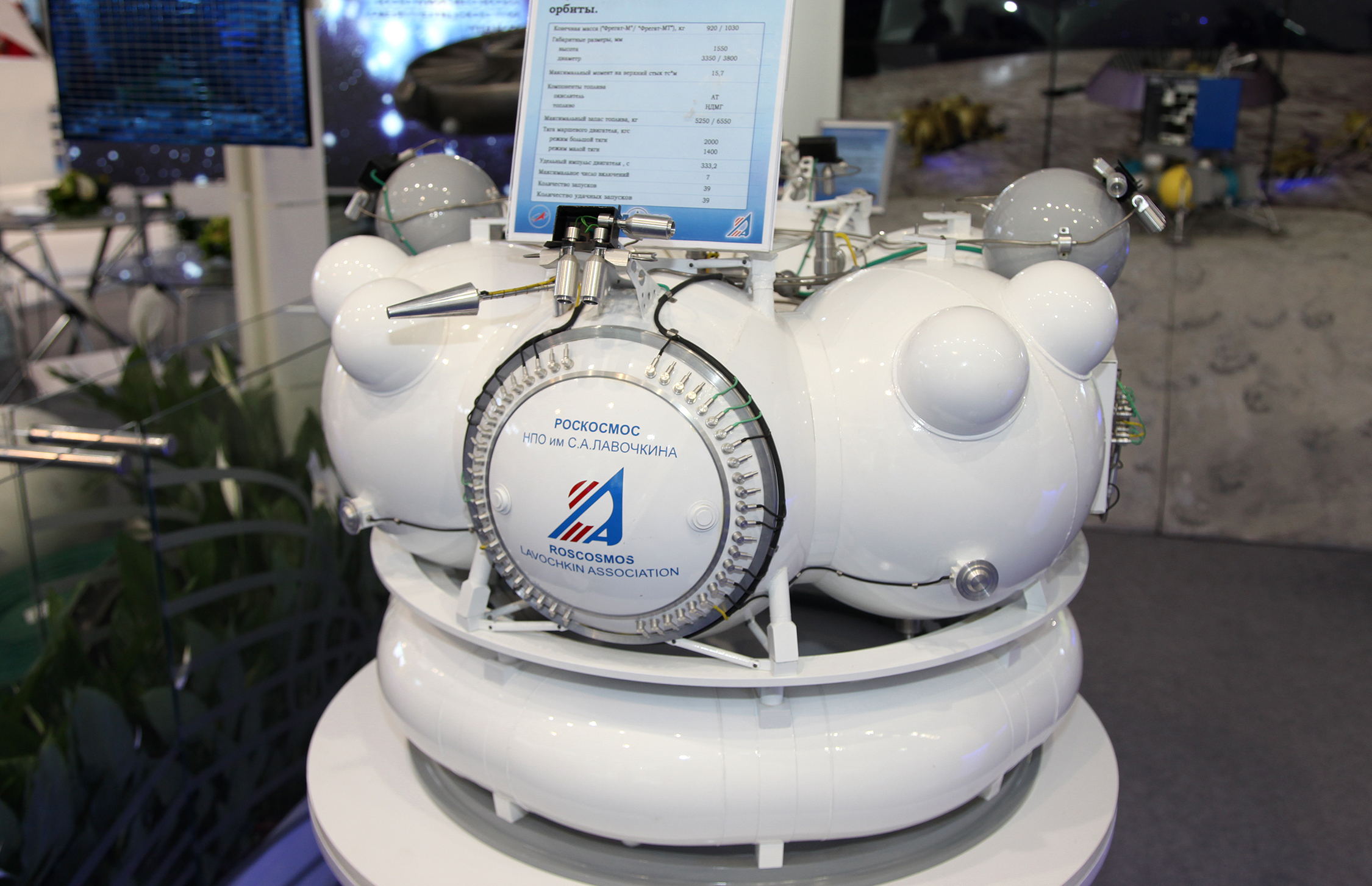
- Model of Fregat at MAKS Airshow, 2013
- Manufacturer: NPO Lavochkin
- Country of origin: Russia
- Used on: Current: Soyuz-2; Retired: Soyuz-FG, Soyuz-ST, Soyuz-U, Zenit-3F

Launch history
- Status: Active
- Total launches: 117
- Successes (stage only): 114
- Failed: 2
- Other: 1 (partial failure)
- First flight: 2 February 2000

General characteristics
- Height: Fregat: 1.875 m (6 ft 1.8 in); Fregat-MT: 1.945 m (6 ft 4.6 in); Fregat-SB: 2.435 m (7 ft 11.9 in)
- Diameter: Fregat: 3.44 m (11 ft 3 in); Fregat-MT: 3.8 m (12 ft 6 in); Fregat-SB: 3.875 m (12 ft 8.6 in)
- Empty mass: Fregat: 945 kg (2,083 lb); Fregat-MT: 1,035 kg (2,282 lb); Fregat-SB: 1,080 kg (2,380 lb)
- Gross mass: Fregat: 6,235 kg (13,746 lb); Fregat-MT: 7,640 kg (16,840 lb); Fregat-SB: 11,680 kg (25,750 lb)
- Propellant mass: Fregat: 5,307 kg (11,700 lb); Fregat-MT: 6,650 kg (14,660 lb); Fregat-SB: 10,330 kg (22,770 lb)
- Powered by: 1 × S5.92
- Maximum thrust: High: 19.85 kN (4,460 lb_{f}); Low: 13.93 kN (3,130 lb_{f})
- Specific impulse: High: 333.2 s (3.268 km/s); Low: 320 s (3.1 km/s)
- Burn time: Up to 1,350 seconds (up to 7 starts)
- Propellant: N_{2}O_{4} / UDMH

Fregat (Russian: Фрегат, lit. 'frigate') is an upper stage developed by NPO Lavochkin for universal compatibility with a wide range of medium- and heavy-lift launch vehicles. Fregat has been used primarily with Soyuz and on a few occasions with Zenit rockets, and entered operational service in February 2000.

Fregat uses a liquid-propellant engine burning unsymmetrical dimethylhydrazine (UDMH) fuel and dinitrogen tetroxide (N_{2}O_{4}) oxidizer, a pair of hypergolic propellants that ignite on contact. With a success rate of 97.3%, including two failures and one partial failure, Fregat is among the most reliable upper stages in operation. It has deployed more than 300 payloads into a variety of orbits and is capable of placing three or more spacecraft into distinct orbits during a single mission, owing to its ability to restart up to seven times and operate for a total burn duration of up to 1,350 seconds.

== Description ==
The Fregat upper stage is a versatile and autonomous vehicle designed to inject large payloads into a range of orbits, including low, medium, and geosynchronous. Additionally, it serves as an escape stage for sending space probes on interplanetary missions, such as the Venus Express and Mars Express.

Developed by NPO Lavochkin in the 1990s, the Fregat features six spherical tanks—four for propellants and two for avionics—arranged in a circle. Its main engine is centrally positioned, allowing for a compact design with a diameter larger than its height. Structural support is provided by eight struts passing through the tanks, which also transfer thrust loads to the launcher. Fregat operates independently from the lower stages of its launch vehicle, with its own guidance, navigation, attitude control, tracking, and telemetry systems.

The Fregat’s design was largely based on the spacecraft bus used in the Soviet Phobos program of the late 1980s, itself based on the architecture used for the Soviet lunar probes developed at NPO Lavochkin in the 1960s. Fregat also integrated several flight-proven subsystems and components from previous spacecraft and rockets. This approach ensured high reliability and accelerated development. Fregat was flight-qualified in February 2000 and successfully completed four missions that same year.

Currently used as the fourth stage on Soyuz launch vehicles, the Fregat’s S5.92 engine is capable of up to 25 ignitions, with seven demonstrated during flight. This allows it to execute complex mission profiles that would be impossible for the launch vehicle alone. The stage provides both three-axis and spin stabilization for spacecraft payloads. Fregat uses storable, hypergolic propellants—unsymmetrical dimethylhydrazine (UDMH) as fuel and dinitrogen tetroxide (N_{2}O_{4}, also called NTO or amyl) as the oxidizer, which ignite spontaneously upon contact. To date, Fregat has successfully deployed over 300 payloads into various orbits and remains the only upper stage capable of placing payloads into three or more distinct orbits in a single launch.

As of 2018, adding a Fregat upper stage to a Soyuz-2 launch costs about US$13.5 million.

== Fregat upper stage launches ==
VS missions are by Arianespace from the Guiana Space Centre.

No.	Date	Number	Modification	Mission	Launch vehicle	Payload	Result
1	2000/02/09	1001	Fregat	ST07	Soyuz-U	Full-size satellite layout, Inflatable Braking Device	Success
2	2000/03/20	1002	Fregat	ST08	Soyuz-U	Dumsat	Success
3	2000/07/16	1003	Fregat	ST09	Soyuz-U	Cluster FM6, Cluster FM7	Success
4	2000/08/09	1004	Fregat	ST10	Soyuz-U	Cluster FM5, Cluster FM8	Success
5	2003/06/02	1005	Fregat	ST11	Soyuz-FG	Mars Express, Beagle 2	Success
6	2003/12/27	1006	Fregat	ST12	Soyuz-FG	AMOS-2	Success
7	2005/08/13	1007	Fregat	ST13	Soyuz-FG	Galaxy 14	Success
8	2005/11/09	1010	Fregat	ST14	Soyuz-FG	Venus Express	Success
9	2005/12/28	1009	Fregat	ST15	Soyuz-FG	GIOVE-A	Success
10	2006/10/19	1011	Fregat	ST16	Soyuz-2.1a	MetOp-A	Success
11	2006/12/24	1012	Fregat	–	Soyuz-2.1a	Meridian No. 11L	Success
12	2006/12/27	1013	Fregat	ST17	Soyuz-2.1b	CoRoT	Success
13	2007/05/29	1016	Fregat	ST18	Soyuz-FG	Globalstar M065, Globalstar M069, Globalstar M071, Globalstar M072	Success
14	2007/10/20	1015	Fregat	ST19	Soyuz-FG	Globalstar M066, Globalstar M067, Globalstar M068, Globalstar M070	Success
15	2007/12/14	1015-2	Fregat	ST20	Soyuz-FG	RADARSAT-2	Success
16	2008/04/26	1008	Fregat	ST21	Soyuz-FG	GIOVE-B	Success
17	2009/05/21	1018	Fregat	–	Soyuz-2.1a	Meridian No. 12L	Success
18	2009/09/17	1014	Fregat	–	Soyuz-2.1b	Meteor-M No. 1, Sterkh, Universitetsky-Tatyana-2, UGATUSAT, BLITS, IRIS, Sumbandila	Success
19	2010/10/19	1023	Fregat-M	ST22	Soyuz-2.1a	Globalstar M073, Globalstar M074, Globalstar M075, Globalstar M076, Globalstar M077, Globalstar M079	Success
20	2010/11/02	1022	Fregat-M	–	Soyuz-2.1a	Meridian No. 13L	Success
21	2011/01/20	2001	Fregat-SB	–	Zenith-3SLBF	Elektro-L No.1	Success
22	2011/02/26	1035	Fregat-M	–	Soyuz-2.1b	Glonass-K No. 11L	Success
23	2011/07/13	1024	Fregat-M	ST23	Soyuz-2.1a	Globalstar M081, Globalstar M083, Globalstar M085, Globalstar M088, Globalstar M089, Globalstar M091	Success
24	2011/07/18	2002	Fregat-SB	–	Zenith-3SLBF	Spektr-R	Success
25	2011/10/02	1045	Fregat-M	–	Soyuz-2.1b	Glonass-M No. 742	Success
26	2011/10/21	1030	Fregat-MT	VS01	Soyuz-ST-B	Galileo 1, Galileo 2	Success
27	2011/11/28	1046	Fregat-M	–	Soyuz-2.1b	Glonass-M No. 746	Success
28	2011/12/17	1021	Fregat	VS02	Soyuz-ST-A	Pleiades-1A, ELISA W11, ELISA E12, ELISA W23, ELISA E24, SSOT	Success
29	2011/12/23	1042	Fregat-M	–	Soyuz-2.1b	Meridian No. 15L	Success
30	2011/12/28	1027	Fregat-M	ST24	Soyuz-2.1a	Globalstar M080, Globalstar M082, Globalstar M084, Globalstar M086, Globalstar M090, Globalstar M092	Success
31	2012/07/22	1019	Fregat	–	Soyuz-FG	Kanopus-V No. 1, Zond-PP, BKA, exactView-1, TET-1	Success
32	2012/09/17	1037	Fregat-M	ST25	Soyuz-2.1a	MetOp-B	Success
33	2012/10/12	1031	Fregat-MT	VS03	Soyuz-ST-B	Galileo 3, Galileo 4	Success
34	2012/11/14	1034	Fregat-M	–	Soyuz-2.1a	Meridian No. 16L	Success
35	2012/12/02	1020	Fregat	VS04	Soyuz-ST-A	Pléiades-1B	Success
36	2013/02/06	1029	Fregat-M	ST26	Soyuz-2.1a	Globalstar M078, Globalstar M093, Globalstar M094, Globalstar M095, Globalstar M096, Globalstar M097	Success
37	2013/04/26	1047	Fregat-M	–	Soyuz-2.1b	Glonass-K No. 747	Success
38	2013/06/25	1041	Fregat-MT	VS05	Soyuz-ST-B	O3b FM1, O3b FM2, O3b FM4, O3b FM5	Success
39	2013/12/19	1040	Fregat-MT	VS06	Soyuz-ST-B	Gaia	Success
40	2014/03/23	112-01	Fregat-M	–	Soyuz-2.1b	Glonass-M No. 754	Success
41	2014/04/03	1038	Fregat-M	VS07	Soyuz-ST-A	Sentinel-1A	Success
42	2014/06/14	112-02	Fregat-M	–	Soyuz-2.1b	Glonass-M No. 755	Success
43	2014/07/08	1025	Fregat-M	–	Soyuz-2.1b	Meteor-M No.2, Vernov, DX1, UKube-1, TechDemoSat-1, SkySat-2, AISSat-2	Success
44	2014/07/10	1032	Fregat-MT	VS08	Soyuz-ST-B	O3b FM3, O3b FM6, O3b FM7, O3b FM8	Success
45	2014/08/22	1039	Fregat-MT	VS09	Soyuz-ST-B	Galileo 5, Galileo 6	Failure
46	2014/10/30	1026	Fregat-M	–	Soyuz-2.1a	Meridian No. 17L	Success
47	2014/11/30	1044	Fregat-M	–	Soyuz-2.1b	Glonass-K No. 12L	Success
48	2014/12/18	133-01	Fregat-MT	VS10	Soyuz-ST-B	O3b FM9, O3b FM10, O3b FM11, O3b FM12	Success
49	2015/03/27	133-02	Fregat-MT	VS11	Soyuz-ST-B	Galileo 7, Galileo 8	Success
50	2015/09/11	133-03	Fregat-MT	VS12	Soyuz-ST-B	Galileo 9, Galileo 10	Success
51	2015/11/17	1033	Fregat-M	–	Soyuz-2.1b	EKS No. 1	Success
52	2015/12/11	2004	Fregat-SB	–	Zenith-3SLBF	Elektro-L No.2 No. 2	Success
53	2015/12/17	133-04	Fregat-MT	VS13	Soyuz-ST-B	Galileo 11, Galileo 12	Success
54	2016/02/07	112-03	Fregat-MT	–	Soyuz-2.1b	Glonass-M No. 751	Success
55	2016/04/25	133-08	Fregat-M	VS14	Soyuz-ST-A	Sentinel-1B	Success
56	2016/05/24	133-05	Fregat-MT	VS15	Soyuz-ST-B	Galileo 13, Galileo 14	Success
57	2016/05/29	112-04	Fregat-M	–	Soyuz-2.1b	Glonass-M No. 753	Success
58	2017/01/28	133-07	Fregat-MT	VS16	Soyuz-ST-B	Hispasat 36W-1	Success
59	2017/05/18	133-09	Fregat-M	VS17	Soyuz-ST-A	SES-15	Success
60	2017/05/25	111–301	Fregat-M	–	Soyuz-2.1b	Tundra No. 2	Success
61	2017/07/14	122-02	Fregat-M	–	Soyuz-2.1a	Kanopus-V-IK, MKA-N No. 1, MKA-N No. 2, Mayak, Iskra-MAI-85, Ecuador UTE-YUZGU», Flying Laptop, TechnoSat, WNISAT-1R, NorSat-1, NorSat-2, Flock-2k 1...48, CICERO 1...3, Corvus-BC 1...2, Lemur-2 42...49, NanoACE	Partial failure
62	2017/09/22	112-05	Fregat-M	–	Soyuz-2.1b	Glonass-M No. 752	Success
63	2017/11/28		Fregat-M	–	Soyuz-2.1b	Meteor-M No.2, Baumanets-2, LEO Vantage 2, Helios-Wire BIU, IDEA-OSG 1, AISSat-3, D-Star One, SEAM, Corvus-BC 3, Lemur-2 58...67	Failure
64	2017/12/26	2006	Fregat-SB	–	Zenith-3SLBF	Angosat-1	Success
65	2018/02/01	122-03	Fregat-M	–	Soyuz-2.1a	Kanopus-V No. 3, Kanopus-V No. 4, Lemur-2 74, Lemur-2 75, Lemur-2 76, Lemur-2 77, S-Net A, S-Net B, S-Net C, S-Net D, D-Star One	Success
66	2018/03/09	133-06	Fregat-MT	VS18	Soyuz-ST-B	O3b FM13, O3b FM14, O3b FM15, O3b FM16	Success
67	2018/06/16	112-06	Fregat-M	–	Soyuz-2.1b	Glonass-M No. 756	Success
68	2018/11/03	112-08	Fregat-M	–	Soyuz-2.1b	Glonass-M No. 757	Success
69	2018/11/07	133-14	Fregat-M	VS19	Soyuz-ST-B	MetOp-C	Success
70	2018/12/19	133-10	Fregat-M	VS20	Soyuz-ST-B	Composante Spatiale Optique	Success
71	2018/12/27	122-06	Fregat-M	–	Soyuz-2.1a	Kanopus-V No. 5, Kanopus-V No. 6, GRUS-1, ZACube-2, Lume-1, Flock-3k 1...12, Lemur-2 88...95, D-Star One iSat, D-Star One Sparrow, UWE-4, ICEYE-Dummy, SAMSON-Dummy 1...3	Success
72	2019/02/21	112-07	Fregat-M	–	Soyuz-2.1b	EgyptSat-A	Success
73	2019/02/27	133-15	Fregat-M	VS21	Soyuz-ST-B	OneWeb-0006, OneWeb-0007, OneWeb-0008, OneWeb-0010, OneWeb-0011, OneWeb-0012	Success
74	2019/04/04	133-17	Fregat-MT	VS22	Soyuz-ST-B	O3b FM17, O3b FM18, O3b FM19, O3b FM20	Success
75	2019/05/27	112-09	Fregat-M	–	Soyuz-2.1b	Glonass-M No. 758	Success
76	2019/07/05	122-04	Fregat-M	–	Soyuz-2.1b	Meteor-M No.2; Sokrat; VDNH-80; AmurSat; SEAM-2.0; MTCube; SONATE; Beesat 9...13; MOVE-IIb; TTU-101; Ecuador-UTE; El Camino Real; Lemur-2 100...107; NSLSat-1; JAISAT-1; EXOCONNECT; LightSat; Lucky-7; ICEYE X4; ICEYE X5; CarboNIX; DoT 1	Success
77	2019/07/30		Fregat-M	–	Soyuz-2.1a	Meridian No. 18L	Success
78	2019/09/26		Fregat-M	–	Soyuz-2.1b	Tundra No. 3	Success
79	2019/12/11	112-10	Fregat-M	–	Soyuz-2.1b	Glonass-M No. 759	Success
80	2019/12/18		Fregat-M	VS23	Soyuz-ST-A	COSMO-SkyMed; CHEOPS; EyeSat; ANGELS; OPS-SAT	Success
81	2020/02/07		Fregat-M	ST27	Soyuz-2.1b	OneWeb (34 units)	Success
82	2020/02/20		Fregat-M	–	Soyuz-2.1a	Meridian No. 19L	Success
83	2020/03/17		Fregat-M	–	Soyuz-2.1b	Glonass-M No.760	Success
84	2020/03/21		Fregat-M	ST28	Soyuz-2.1b	OneWeb (34 units)	Success
85	2020/12/29		Fregat	VS24	Soyuz ST-A	Falcon Eye 2	Success
86	2021/02/28	122-07	Fregat-M	–	Soyuz-2.1b	Arktika-M No.1	Success
87	2021/03/22	122-05	Fregat-M	–	Soyuz-2.1a	CAS500-1; ELSA-d Target, Chaser; DMSAT-1; Fukui Prefectural Satellite; GRUS-1 × 3 ADELIS-SAMSON x 3 BeeSat × 4 Challenge One; CubeSX-HSE; CubeSX-Sirius-HSE; GRBAlpha; Hiber-3; Kepler-6,7; KMSL; KSU_Cubesat; LacunaSat-2b; Shaheen Sat 17; NANOSATC-BR2; OrbiCraft-Zorkiy; Pumbaa, Timon; WildTrackCube-SIMBA; 3B5GSAT; UNISAT-7; BCCSAT-1; FEES; DIY; SMOG-1; STECCO	Success
88	2021/03/25	123-05	Fregat	ST30	Soyuz-2.1b	OneWeb (36 units)	Success
89	2021/04/25	123-11	Fregat	ST31	Soyuz-2.1b	OneWeb (36 units)	Success
90	2021/05/28	123-10	Fregat	ST32	Soyuz-2.1b	OneWeb (36 units)	Success
91	2021/07/01	112-15	Fregat	ST33	Soyuz-2.1b	OneWeb (36 units)	Success
92	2021/08/21	123-03	Fregat	ST34	Soyuz-2.1b	OneWeb (34 units)	Success
93	2021/09/14	123-05	Fregat	ST35	Soyuz-2.1b	OneWeb (34 units)	Success
94	2021/10/14	123-14	Fregat	ST36	Soyuz-2.1b	OneWeb (36 units)	Success
95	2021/11/25	111–305	Fregat	–	Soyuz-2.1b	EKS-5	Success
96	2021/12/05	133-13	Fregat-MT	VS26	Soyuz ST-B	Galileo FOC FM23; Galileo FOC FM24	Success
97	2021/12/27	123-04	Fregat	ST37	Soyuz-2.1b	OneWeb (36 units)	Success
98	2022/02/05	111–401	Fregat	–	Soyuz-2.1a	Neitron No.1	Success
99	2022/02/10	133-19	Fregat-MT	VS27	Soyuz ST-B	OneWeb (34 units)	Success
100	2022/03/22	111-?	Fregat	–	Soyuz-2.1a	Meridian-M 10 (20L)	Success
101	2022/07/07	112-13	Fregat	–	Soyuz-2.1b	GLONASS-K 16	Success
102	2022/08/09	123-06	Fregat	–	Soyuz-2.1b	Khayyam; CubeXS-HSE-2; CYCLOPS; Geoscan-Edelweiss; ISOI; KAI-1; KODIZ; Kuzbass-300; MIET-AIS; Polytech Universe-1, 2 ReshUCube-1; Siren; Skoltech B1, B2; UTMN; VIZARD-SS1	Success
103	2022/10/10	112-16	Fregat	–	Soyuz-2.1b	GLONASS-K 17	Success
104	2022/10/22	142-503	Fregat	–	Soyuz-2.1b	Gonets-M 23, 24, 25; Skif-D	Success
105	2022/11/02	111-306	Fregat	–	Soyuz-2.1b	EKS-6	Success
106	2022/11/28	112-??	Fregat	–	Soyuz-2.1b	GLONASS-M 761	Success
107	2023/05/26	142-01	Fregat	–	Soyuz-2.1a	Kondor-FKA No.1	Success
108	2023/06/27	142-02	Fregat	–	Soyuz-2.1b	Meteor-M No.2-3; Ahmat-1; ArcCube-01; A-SEANSAT-PG1; Avion; BSUSat-2; CSTP-1.1, 1.2; Cube-SX-HSE-3; Impuls-1; Khors-1, 2 KuzGTU-1; Monitor-2, 3, 4 Nanosond-1; NORBI 2 PHI-Demo; Polytech Universe-3; Rassvet-1 × 3 ReshUCube-2; SamSat-ION; Saturn; Sirius-SINP-3U; SITRO-AIS × 8 StratoSat TK-1; Svyatobor-1; UmKa-1; UTMN-2; Vizard-meteo; Yarilo-3, 4 Zorkiy-2M	Success
109	2023/08/07	112-23	Fregat	–	Soyuz-2.1b	GLONASS-K2 13L	Success
110	2023/08/10	122-10	Fregat	–	Soyuz-2.1b	Luna 25	Success
111	2023/12/16	122-11	Fregat	–	Soyuz-2.1b	Arktika-M No. 2	Success
112	2024/02/29	142-03	Fregat-M	–	Soyuz-2.1b	Meteor-M No.2-4; MARAFON-D-GVM; Pars 1 SITRO-AIS × 16; Zorkiy-2M-2	Success
113	2024/05/16	?	Fregat-M	–	Soyuz-2.1b	Nivelir-L No.4 (Kosmos 2576); Rassvet-2 × 3 SITRO-AIS × 4 Zorkiy-2M-4; Zorkiy-2M-6	Success
114	2024/11/04	142-601	Fregat-M	–	Soyuz-2.1b	Ionosfera-M No.1; Ionosfera-M No.2; Altair; ArcticSat-1; ASRTU-2; CSTP-2.1, 2.11, 2.2; Gorizont; Hod-Hod 1A; HyperView-1G; Khors 3, 4 Kolibri-S; Kowsar; Mordovia-IoT; MTUCI-1; Nokhcho; Norbi-3; Polytech Universe-4, 5 RTU MIREA 1 Ruzaevka-390; SamSat-ION 2 SIT-2086; SIT-HSE; SITRO-AIS × 24; TUSUR-GO; Vizard-ion; Vladivostok-1; YUZGU-60; ZimSat-2	Success
115	2024/11/29	142-04	Fregat-M	–	Soyuz-2.1a	Kondor-FKA No.2	Success
116	2025/05/23	?	Fregat-M	–	Soyuz-2.1b	Nivelir-L No.5 (Kosmos 2588)	Success
116	2025/05/23	142-05	Fregat-M	–	Soyuz-2.1b	Ionosfera-M No.3; Ionosfera-M No.4; Nahid-2; 239Alferov; AstroLine 1, 2, 3 ,4; CSTP-4.1, 4.2, 4.3 ,4.4; Geoskan × 6 InnoSat-3, 16	Success

== Failures ==
=== August 2014 failure ===
The Arianespace-operated flight of a Fregat MT ended in failure on 22 August 2014 after the vehicle deposited two EU/ESA Galileo navigation satellites into the wrong orbit. The lift off at 12:27:11 UTC from the Sinnamary launch site near Kourou, French Guiana, appeared to go well. However, a failure was only apparent later when, after the second firing of the Fregat MT upper stage had taken place, the satellites were detected as being in the wrong orbit.

The Independent Inquiry Board formed to analyze the causes of the "anomaly" announced its definitive conclusions on 7 October 2014 following a meeting at Arianespace headquarters in Évry, near Paris. The failure occurred during the flight of the Fregat fourth stage. It occurred about 35 minutes after liftoff, at the beginning of the ballistic phase preceding the second ignition of this stage. The scenario that led to an error in the orbital injection of the satellites was precisely reconstructed, as follows:

- The orbital error resulted from an error in the thrust orientation of the main engine on the Fregat stage during its second powered phase.
- This orientation error was the result of the loss of inertial reference for the stage.
- This loss occurred when the stage's inertial system operated outside its authorized operating envelope, an excursion that was caused by the failure of two of Fregat's attitude control thrusters during the preceding ballistic phase.
- This failure was due to a temporary interruption of the joint hydrazine propellant supply to these thrusters.
- The interruption in the flow was caused by freezing of the hydrazine.
- The freezing resulted from the proximity of hydrazine and cold helium feed lines, these lines being connected by the same support structure, which acted as a thermal bridge.
- Ambiguities in the design documents allowed the installation of this type of thermal "bridge" between the two lines. In fact, such bridges have also been seen on other Fregat stages now under production at NPO Lavochkin.
- The design ambiguity is the result of not taking into account the relevant thermal transfers during the thermal analyses of the stage system design.

The root cause of the failure of flight VS09 is therefore a shortcoming in the system thermal analysis performed during stage design, and not an operator error during stage assembly.

Since 22 August 2014, Soyuz ST-B launch vehicles with Fregat-MT upper stages have performed three successful launches, six Galileo navigation satellites have been inserted into their target orbits in frame of Soyuz at the Guiana Space Centre ongoing ESA programme.

=== July 2017 partial failure ===
In July 2017, a Russian-operated rideshare flight of a Fregat upper stage ended with 9 of 72 small satellites dead-on-orbit.

=== November 2017 failure ===
The Russian-operated flight of a Fregat upper stage ended in failure after the vehicle deposited the upper stage, a Meteor MS-1 weather satellite, and 18 secondary cubesats back into Earth's atmosphere due to the first Fregat burn being ignited with the stage in the wrong orientation. The guidance computer on the Soyuz rocket's Fregat upper stage was mis-programmed, causing it to begin an unnecessary turn that left it in the wrong orientation for a critical engine burn required to enter orbit.

== Orbital debris ==
The Fregats did not have enough impulse capability to de-orbit themselves after placing their payload into orbit and so several have remained in orbit as space debris.

The Fregat-SB upper stage rocket used to launch the Russian Spektr-R satellite into orbit in 2011, broke into multiple pieces on May 8, 2020 creating even more debris than normal.

== Versions ==
=== Fregat-M/Fregat-MT ===
Fregat-M/Fregat-MT tanks have ball-shaped additions on the tops of the tanks. These additions increase the load capability of the propellant from 5,350 kilograms (11,790 lb) to 6,640 kilograms (14,640 lb), without causing any other changes to the physical dimensions of the vehicle.

=== Fregat-SB ===
A version called Fregat-SB can be used with Zenit-2SB launch vehicle. This version is a variation of Fregat-M with a block of drop-off tanks ("SBB" or Сбрасываемый Блок Баков in Russian) which makes increased payload capability possible. The torus-shaped SBB weighs 360 kg (790 lb) and contains up to 3,050 kg (6,720 lb) of propellant. The total dry weight of the Fregat-SB (including SBB) is 1,410 kg (3,110 lb) and the maximum propellant carrying capacity is 10,150 kg (22,380 lb).

Fregat-SB was launched for the first time on 20 January 2011, when it lifted the Elektro-L weather satellite into geosynchronous orbit.

=== All versions data ===
Fregat Upper Stage Family
Stage	Fregat	Fregat-M	Fregat-MT	Fregat-SB	Fregat-SBU	Fregat-2
Engine	S5.92	S5.92 LN (Long Nozzle)				
Total Launches	44	52	17	4	–	–
Thrust (Low)	13.73 kN (3,090 lb_{f})	13.96 kN (3,140 lb_{f})				
Thrust (High)	19.61 kN (4,410 lb_{f})	20.01 kN (4,500 lb_{f})				
Specific Impulse (Low)	3,168 N*s/kg	3,222 N*s/kg				
Specific Impulse (High)	3,207 N*s/kg	3,268 N*s/kg				
Propellant (Max)	5,350 kg (11,790 lb)	6,640 kg (14,640 lb)	7,100 kg (15,700 lb)	10,000 kg (22,000 lb)	10,710 kg (23,610 lb)	12,240 kg (26,980 lb)
Burn Time	1235...874 seconds	1535...1085 seconds	1640...1160 seconds	2310...1635 seconds	2475...1750 seconds	2830...2000 seconds
Flow Rate	4.3...6.1 kg/s					
Total Impulse	16.9...17.2 MN*s	21.4...21.7 MN*s	22.9...23.2 MN*s	32.2...32.7 MN*s	34.5...35.0 MN*s	39.4...40.0 MN*s
