= Low-rate picture transmission =

The low-rate picture transmission (LRPT) is a digital transmission system, intended to deliver images and data from an orbital weather satellite directly to end users via a VHF radio signal. It is used aboard polar-orbiting, low-Earth weather satellite programs such as Meteor-M, previously MetOp and was planned for NPOESS.

== Purpose ==
LRPT provides three image channels at full sensor resolution (10-bit, 1 km/pixel, six lines/second) in addition to data from other sensors, such as atmospheric sounders and GPS positioning information.

The system is an update and replacement of the existing analog system called automatic picture transmission (APT), which has been used since the 1960s aboard NOAA's TIROS polar-orbiting satellites. The APT system provided only two image channels, which were at a reduced accuracy and resolution (8-bit, 4 km/pixel, two lines/second). Compared to the APT system, LRPT images are four times more accurate and contain twelve times the resolution. Further, the additional data from other sensors increases the applications of the satellites and the users who receive the signal.

== Design ==
LRPT uses a packetized datastream transmitted at an approximately 62 kilobits per second (kbit/s) rate. Each sensor using the LRPT is considered an application and provided a percentage of the transmission bandwidth in the form of a virtual channel. For example, the advanced very-high-resolution radiometer (AVHRR) imaging sensor is provided approximately 40 kbit/s to transmit its three image channels, and the high-resolution infrared radiation sounder (HIRS) is provided approximately 2900 bit/s. The packetized application system provides the flexibility to transmit and receive new types of data in the future using the same hardware.

The datastream is processed using a Reed–Solomon error correction, then convolution encoded, interleaved, and padded with unique synchronization words. The resulting binary stream is approximately 160 kbit/s.

It is transmitted as an 80 kiloBaud quadrature phase-shift keyed (QPSK) signal on an RF carrier in the 137 MHz-band, with an equivalent isotropically radiated power level that varies between 3.2 dBW (2 watts) and 8.0 dBW (6.3 watts).

To ensure the low-complexity ground stations that previously received the APT signal would be able to access the LRPT signal, a design study was included with the LRPT specification. Labeled Annex 1, it shows the calculations which approximate the worst-case link budget for fixed, omnidirectional antenna reception will be 4.9 dB when the satellite is 13° above the horizon, and improve to 8.6 dB at 30° or higher elevations.

== Image data ==
The AVHRR image data, in its raw form, consists of three images, each composed of six lines per second, at 2048 pixels per line, using 10-bits per pixel. This yields a raw datarate of 368,640 bit/s; approximately ten times greater than the allocated bandwidth. Therefore, the data is compressed using the JPEG extended DCT compression, adapted to a fixed compression ratio with continuous operation (no header or trailer), to fit the virtual channel size.

The imager data is gathered into image "strips" of 2048 pixels wide and 8 rows tall before being compressed. Each packet contains three of these image strips, one for each image channel. To reconstruct a 2048x2048 image requires 256 consecutive AVHRR image packets.

== Current status and future ==
Although LRPT is on the European MetOp-A satellite launched on 19 October 2006, LRPT was permanently deactivated on that vehicle after causing interference with the High Resolution Infrared Radiation Sounder (HIRS).

The initial investigations regarding the interference on MetOp-A HIRS have been completed, and the conclusion is that no scenario exists where LRPT on MetOp-A can be turned on without causing heavy interference on HIRS. Due to the operational importance of HIRS and the lack of an established LRPT user community, it is clear that LRPT will not be turned on again operationally on MetOp-A.

— Announcement to NOAA from EUMETSAT on 5 February 2007

Because of the fundamental nature of this interference in relation to the MetOp design, plans to operate LRPT on Metop-B and Metop-C were cancelled.

NOAA-19, launched on 6 February 2009 (decommissioned August 13 2025) is the last NOAA satellite to carry the old analog automatic picture transmission (APT) system, which dates back to the 1960s. At one point, NOAA indicated it would move to a system such as LRPT on future vehicles, but after the NPOESS program was replaced with JPSS in February 2010, NOAA decided to eliminate Low Rate Data (LRD) transmissions from JPSS.

On 8 July 2014, Russia launched the METEOR-M No. 2 weather satellite (also known as METEOR-M2) with LRPT on board. Instructions for receiving LRPT images from this satellite are posted on the Internet.

On 4 July 2019, the METEOR-M N2-2 satellite was launched. It operated successfully until December of the same year when it was struck by a micrometeorite. The satellite remains partially operational, however the damage forced the operators to terminate the LRPT downlink.

On 27 June 2023, the METEOR-M N2-3 satellite was launched and is operating nominally. However, the antenna failed to deploy completely, resulting in a reduced signal strength.

== See also ==
- High-resolution picture transmission (HRPT)

== Notes and references ==
- Metop HRPT/LRPT User Station Elements Design Specification, document EPS.ASPI.DS.0675, which documents the design specification of an HRPT User Station and an LRPT User Station. To download this, google: EPS.ASPI.DS.0675 site:eumetsat.int
- Schott, Tom, NOAA Polar Satellite Program Overview, PowerPoint presentation dated 25 October 2005. Go to https://archive.org, enter https://web.archive.org/web/20110520195359/http://www.ipo.noaa.gov/polarmax/2005/day01/1.5PolarMax2005-POESOverview-Schott.ppt, and click on one of the dates at which the document was archived. Slide 19 indicates that 2006 would be the year in which the cost effectiveness of LRPT would be evaluated.
