= Meteor (satellite) =

Series of weather observation satellites launched by Russia

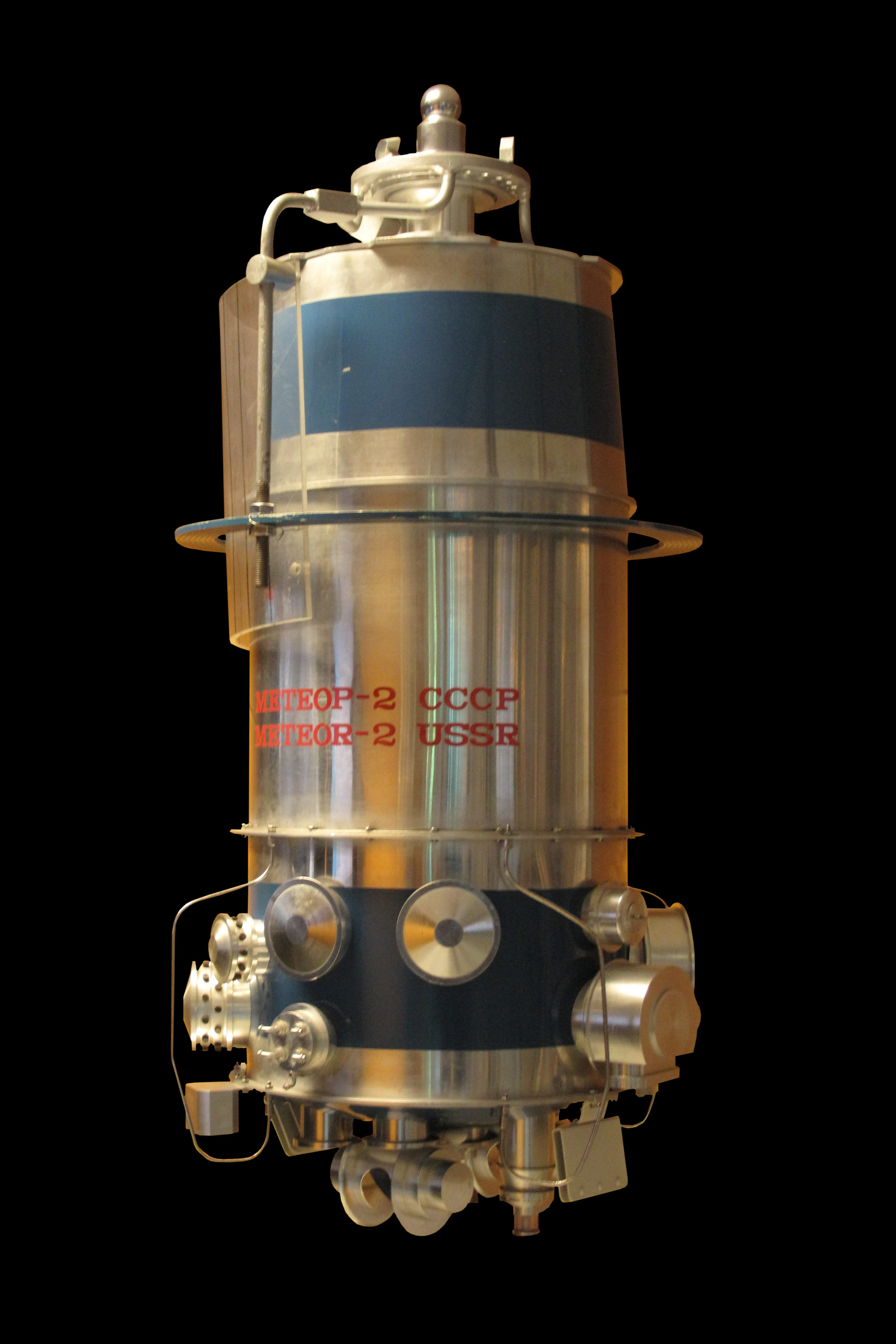
Model of a Meteor-2 satellite

The Meteor spacecraft are weather observation satellites launched by the Soviet Union and Russia since the Cold War. The Meteor satellite series was initially developed during the 1960s. The Meteor satellites were designed to monitor atmospheric and sea-surface temperatures, humidity, radiation, sea ice conditions, snow-cover, and clouds. Between 1964 and 1969, a total of eleven Soviet Union Meteor satellites were launched.

== Satellites ==
Unlike the United States, which has separate civilian and military weather satellites, the Soviet Union used a single weather satellite type for both purposes.

=== Meteor Prototype ===
Meteor Prototype launches

Satellite	Launch date	NSSDC ID	SCN	Apogee, km	Perigee, km	Inclination	Period, min	Note
Kosmos 44	28 August 1964	1964-053A	00876	857	615	65.04°		Technology demonstrator
Kosmos 58	26 February 1965	1965-014A	01907	647	563	65°		Technology demonstrator
Kosmos 100	17 December 1965	1965-106A	01843	658	630	65°		Technology demonstrator
Kosmos 118	11 May 1966	1966-038A	02168	657	587	65°		Technology demonstrator
Kosmos 122	25 June 1966	1966-057A	02254	683	657	65.14°	97.12	Launched as Meteor 5L
Kosmos 144	28 February 1967	1967-018A	02695	625	625	81.2°	96.9	Launched as Meteor 6L
Kosmos 156	27 April 1967	1967-039A	02762	630	630	81.2°	97.0	
Kosmos 184	24 October 1967	1967-102A	03010	635	635	81.2°	97.1	
Kosmos 206	14 March 1968	1968-019A	03150	630	630	81.2°	97.0	
Kosmos 226	12 June 1968	1968-049A	03282	603	650	81.2°	96.9	
—	1 February 1969	—	—	—	—	—	—	Launch failure

=== Meteor-1 ===
Meteor-1 was a set of fully operational Russian meteorological satellite launched from the Plesetsk site. The satellites were placed in a near-circular, near-polar prograde orbit to provide near-global observations of the earth's weather systems, cloud cover, ice and snow fields, and reflected and emitted radiation from the dayside and nightside of the earth-atmosphere system for operational use by the Soviet Hydrometeorological Service. 31 satellites were launched between 1969 and 1981.

Meteor-1 launches

Satellite	Launch date	NSSDC ID	SCN	Apogee, km	Perigee, km	Inclination	Period, min	Note
Meteor-1 1	26 March 1969	1969-029A	03835	644	713	81.2°	97.9	
Meteor-1 2	6 October 1969	1969-084A	04119	630	690	81.2°	97.7	
Meteor-1 3	17 March 1970	1970-019A	04349	555	643	81.2°	96.4	
Meteor-1 4	28 April 1970	1970-037A	04393	637	736	81.2°	98.1	
Meteor-1 5	23 June 1970	1970-047A	04419	863	906	81.2°	102.0	
Meteor-1 6	15 October 1970	1970-085A	04583	633	674	81.2°	97.5	
Meteor-1 7	20 January 1971	1971-003A	04849	630	767	81.2°	97.6	
Meteor-1 8	17 April 1971	1971-031A	05142	620	646	81.2°	97.2	
Meteor-1 9	16 July 1971	1971-059A	05327	618	650	81.2°	97.3	
Meteor-1 10	29 December 1971	1971-120A	05731	880	905	81.2°	102.7	
Meteor-1 11	30 March 1972	1972-022A	05917	878	903	81.2°	102.6	
Meteor-1 12	30 June 1972	1972-049A	06079	897	929	81.2°	103.0	
Meteor-1 13	27 October 1972	1972-085A	06256	893	904	81.2°	102.6	
Meteor-1 14	20 March 1973	1972-085A	06392	882	903	81.2°	102.6	
Meteor-1 15	29 May 1973	1973-034A	06659	867	909	81.2°	102.5	
Meteor-1 16	5 March 1974	1974-011A	07209	853	906	81.2°	102.2	
Meteor-1 17	24 April 1974	1974-025A	07274	877	907	81.2°	102.6	
Meteor-1 19	28 October 1974	1974-083A	07490	855	917	81.2°	102.5	
Meteor-1 20	17 December 1974	1974-099A	07574	861	910	81.2°	102.4	
Meteor-1 21	1 April 1975	1975-023A	07714	877	906	81.2°	102.6	
Meteor-1 22	18 September 1975	1975-087A	08293	867	918	81.2°	102.3	Cloud Observation. End of life - 1 Dec 1976. Derelict satellite as of 3/30/2023
Meteor-1 23	25 December 1975	1975-124A	08519	857	913	81.2°	102.4	
Meteor-1 24	7 April 1976	1976-032A	08799	863	906	81.2°	102.3	
Meteor-1 25	14 May 1976	1976-043A	08845	890	833	81.3°	102.0	meteorological satellite
Meteor-1 26	16 October 1976	1976-102A	09481	871	904	81.3°	102.5	
Meteor-1 27	5 April 1977	1977-024A	09903	869	909	81.3°	102.5	

Meteor-1-25, also called "Meteor-Priroda-2", launched on 15 May 1976 by the USSR out of Plesetsk on a Vostok-2M. It was a meteorological satellite that provided global observations of the earth's weather systems, cloud cover, ice and snow fields, vertical profiles of temperature and moisture, and reflected and emitted radiation from the dayside and nightside of the earth-atmosphere system for operational use by the Soviet Hydrometeorological Service. It carried an East German-designed experimental infrared Fourier spectrometers for on-orbit testing of the new instrument for weather observation. The satellite ceased operations on three years later and is now a derelict spacecraft.

=== Meteor-2 ===
The Meteor-2 series, based on the Meteor-1, was the second generation of Soviet meteorological satellites. They were launched into orbit at first by the Vostok-2M launch vehicle until that was replaced by the Tsyklon-3 launch vehicle in the early 1980s. Between 1975 and 1993, 21 Meteor-2's were launched. They were flown in non-sun-synchronous polar orbits with altitudes between 850 and 950 km and inclinations of 81-82º. They weighed about 1,300 kg and had two solar arrays.

The instruments consisted of three television-type (frame technique) VIS and IR scanners, a five-channel scanning radiometer and a radiometer (RMK-2) for measuring radiation flux densities in the near-Earth space.

In addition to its regular payload, Meteor-2-21 carried a unique Fizeau Retro Reflector Array (RRA) for Satellite Laser Ranging applications.

Several of the satellites have begun to break up and create debris. #16 broke up in 1998 after a propulsion failure. #18 broke up the following year for unknown reasons. #4 broke up in March 2004. #17 broke up in June 2005.

==== Meteor-2-2 ====
Meteor 2-2 launched on 6 January 1977 by the USSR out of Plesetsk on a Vostok 2-M with 1st Generation Upper Stage. It was an earth science satellite that performed cloud observation and IR temperature/humidity sounding. It ceased operations on 6 July 1978. Since then, the satellite had broken up into several pieces of debris.

==== Meteor-2-5 ====
Meteor 2-5 launched on 31 October 1979 by the USSR out of Plesetsk on a Vostok 2-M with 1st Generation Upper Stage. It has undergone several breakup events, the first before January 2005 and the last as recently as 2013 or 2014, resulting in 83 known pieces of which 60 were still on-orbit as of 2019.

==== Meteor-2-6 ====
Meteor 2-6 launched on 9 September 1980 by the USSR out of Plesetsk on a Vostok 2-M with 1st Generation Upper Stage. It was an Earth Science/Weather satellite that gathered meteorological information and data on penetrating radiation fluxes in circumterrestrial space. It has since broken apart into multiple pieces of space debris.

==== Meteor 2-7 ====
Meteor 2-7 launched on May 14, 1981, by the USSR out of Plesetsk on a Vostok 2-M with 1st Generation Upper Stage. It had a weight of 2,750 kg, and contained the usual suite of communication and orbit control equipment powered by large solar arrays. Its mission was cloud observation and IR temperature/humidity sounding, using a Radiation Measurement Complex (RMk-2), Infrared Sounding Radiometer, Television Camera and Infrared Instrument. It ceased operations on 14 November 1982. In March 2004, it experienced an event, or a series of events, that caused it to break into 8 pieces. The cause of this break-up is unknown.

==== Meteor 2-8 ====
Meteor 2-8 launched on 25 March 1982 by the USSR out of Plesetsk on a Tsyklon-3 It had a weight of 1,500 kg, and It carried scientific and meteorological instruments, and service systems. Its mission was cloud observation and IR temperature/humidity sounding, using a Radiation Measurement Complex (RMk-2), Infrared Sounding Radiometer, Television Camera and Infrared Instrument. It ceased operations on 25 September 1983. On 29 May 1999, it experienced a break-up event that caused it to break into 53 pieces. The cause of this break-up is unknown.

==== Meteor-2-21 ====
Meteor-2-21/Fizeau is the twenty-first and last in the Meteor-2 series of Russian meteorological satellites.

ILRS Mission Support Status: Satellite Laser Ranging (SLR) tracking support of this satellite was discontinued in October 1998. What makes Meteor-2-21 distinctive from the other meteorological satellites is its unique retroreflector array. The name Fizeau is derived from a French physicist, Armand Fizeau who, in 1851, conducted an experiment which tested for the aether convection coefficient. SLR tracking of this satellite was used for precise orbit determination and the Fizeau experiment. The Fizeau experiment tests the theory of special relativity – that distance events that are simultaneous for one observer will not be simultaneous for another observer who is in motion relative to the first observer.

Retroreflector Array (RRA) Characteristics: The retro-reflector array consists of three corner cubes in a linear array with the two outer corner cubes pointing at 45-degree angles relative to the central cube. The central cube is made of fused silica and has a two-lobe Far Field Diffraction Pattern (FFDP) providing nearly equal intensities for compensated and uncompensated velocity aberration. Both outer reflectors have aluminum coating on the reflecting surfaces and near-diffraction-limited FFDPs. One of the end reflectors is made of fused silica with an index of refraction of 1.46 and should provide partial compensation of the velocity aberration. The other end reflector is made of fused glass with an index of refraction of 1.62 and should provide a perfect compensation of the velocity aberration.

SLR full-rate data from MOBLAS 4, MOBLAS 7, and Maidanak seem to confirm the presence of the compensating influence of the Fizeau effect. Resur-1, another Russian satellite launched in 1994, has 2 corner cubes reflectors with near diffraction-limited FFDPs, which were specifically designed for the continuation of this experiment. WESTPAC, a future SLR satellite, will verify indisputably the existence or otherwise of the Fizeau effect.

Instrumentation: Meteor-2-21/Fizeau had the following instrumentation on board:

1. Scanning telephotometer
2. Scanning infrared radiometers
3. Radiation measurement complex
4. Retroreflector array

=== Meteor-Priroda ===
Meteor-Priroda is a series of experimental satellites launched. Internal document of Russian space agency show that it is originally only used to describe Meteor 1-31 at the time, but later extend to all experimental satellites. It is commonly perceived to only include 6 satellites: Meteor 1-18, Meteor 1-25, Meteor 1-28, Meteor 1-29, Meteor 1-30, and Meteor 1-31. Evidence suggest that Kosmos 1484 should also be included.

Meteor-Priroda series is considered to be prototypes for the Resurs O1 satellites.

Meteor-Priroda launches

Satellite	Launch date	NSSDC ID	SCN	Apogee, km	Perigee, km	Inclination	Period, min	Note
Use of Meteor-1 series platform
Meteor-Priroda 1 (Meteor-1 18)	9 July 1974	1974-052A	07363	877	905	81.2°	102.6	
Meteor-Priroda 2-1 (Meteor-1 25)	15 May 1976	1976-043A	08845	866	900	81.2°	102.4	
Use of Meteor-2 series platform
Meteor-Priroda 2-2 (Meteor-1 28)	29 June 1977	1977-057A	10113	602	685	98.0°	97.5	
Meteor-Priroda 2-3 (Meteor-1 29)	25 January 1979	1979-005A	11251	628	657	97.9°	97.4	
Meteor-Priroda 3-1 (Meteor-1 30)	18 June 1980	1980-051A	11848	589	678	97.9°	97.3	
Meteor-Priroda 2-4 (Meteor-1 31)	10 July 1981	1981-065A	12585	611	688	97.9°	97.6	
Meteor-Priroda 3-2 (Kosmos 1484)	24 July 1983	1983-075A	14207	595	673	98.0°	97.3	

=== Meteor-3 ===
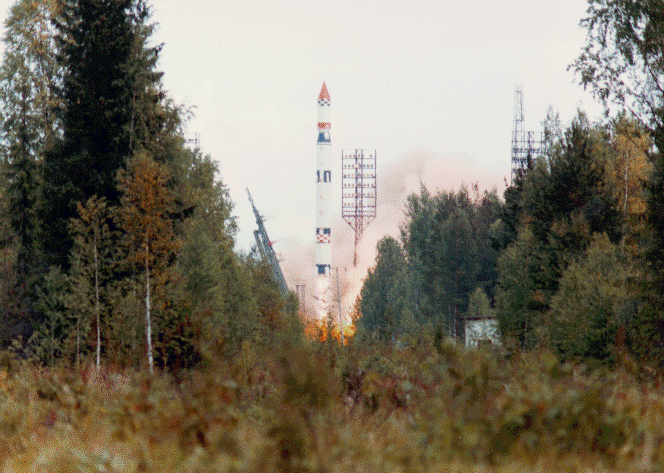
Launch of Meteor-3 on a Tsyklon-3 rocket

The Meteor-3 series was launched 7 times between 1984 and 1994 after a difficult and protracted development program that began in 1972. All the satellites were launched on Tsyklon-3 rockets. These satellites provide weather information including data on clouds, ice and snow cover, atmospheric radiation and humidity. The Meteor-3 class of satellites orbit in a higher altitude than the Meteor-2 class of satellites thus providing more complete coverage of the Earth's surface. The Meteor-3 has the same payload as the Meteor-2 but also includes an advanced scanning radiometer with better spectral and spatial resolution and a spectrometer for determining total ozone content. Meteorological data is transmitted to four primary sites in the former Soviet Union in conjunction with about 80 other smaller sites.

Meteor-3 launches

Satellite	s/n	Launch date	NSSDC ID	SCN	Apogee, km	Perigee, km	Inclination	Period, min	Note
Kosmos 1612	1	27 November 1984	1984-120A	15406	130.2	1230.8	82.61°	98.15	launch failure, stage 3 failed to reignite
Meteor-3 1	2	24 October 1985	1985-100A	16191	1236.0	1264.0	82.53°	110.32	
Meteor-3 2	3	26 July 1988	1988-064A	19336	1198.2	1221.9	82.55°	109.42	
Meteor-3 3	4	25 October 1989	1989-086A	20305	1191.0	1228.0	82.57°	109.49	
Meteor-3 4	6	24 April 1991	1991-030A	21232	1190.0	1229.0	82.55°	109.50	
Meteor-3 5	5	15 August 1991	1991-056A	21655	1199.7	1220.1	82.57°	109.40	
Meteor-3 6	7	25 January 1994	1994-003A	22969	1191	1228	82°	109.40	

==== Meteor-3-5 ====
Meteor-3-5, launched in 1991, is in a slightly higher orbit than Meteor-2-21, and operated until 1994. It transmitted on 137.300 MHz. Mechanically, it is similar to Meteor-2-21. Which satellite was in operation depended on the sun angles and consequently the seasons. Meteor-3-5 was usually the (Northern Hemisphere) "summer" satellite while 2-21 was in operation for approximately the half-year centered on winter. The satellite carried the second Total Ozone Mapping Spectrometer (TOMS) aloft as the first and the last American-built instrument to fly on a Soviet spacecraft. Launched from the Plesetsk, Russia, facility near the White Sea, on 15 August 1991, Meteor-3 TOMS had a unique orbit that presents special problems for processing data. Meteor-3 TOMS began returning data in August 1991 and stopped in December 1994.

==== Meteor-3-6/PRARE ====
The Meteor-3-6/PRARE satellite is the sixth in the Russian Meteor-3 series of meteorological satellites launched in 1994.

ILRS Mission Support Status: Satellite laser ranging and PRARE data was used for precision orbit determination and intercomparison of the two techniques. ILRS tracking support of this satellite was discontinued on 11 November 1995.

Instrumentation: Meteor-3-6 has the following instrumentation on board:

1. Scanning TV-sensor
2. Visible light and infrared radiometers
3. Scanning infrared radiometer
4. Ozone Mapper
5. Precise Range and Range-Rate Equipment (PRARE)
6. Retroreflector array

RetroReflector Array (RRA) Characteristics: The retro-reflector array is a box wing annulus with a diameter of 28 cm and has 24 corner cube reflectors.

==== Meteor-3M ====
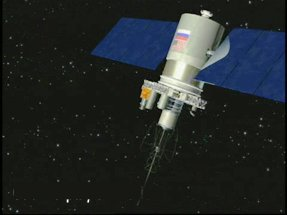
Meteor-3M satellite

The Meteor-3M series of satellites was to be an advanced series of polar orbiters with one 1.4 km resolution visible channel and a ten-channel radiometer with 3 km resolution. Initially four Meteor-3M satellites were planned, however due to financial difficulties only one was launched.

=== Meteor-M ===
The first Meteor-M satellite, Meteor-M No.1, was launched 17 September 2009 at 16:55:07 UTC from Baikonur by a Soyuz-2-1b/Fregat rocket. Its mission ended in 2014.

The second satellite, Meteor-M No.2, was launched 8 July 2014 at 16:58:28 UTC from Baikonur by a Soyuz-2-1b/Fregat rocket. Its mission is scheduled to last 5 years.

On 27 November 2017, the launch of Meteor-M No.2-1 was lost after a programming error; also lost were 18 smaller satellites from other nations.

On 5 July 2019, the replacement satellite for the failed Meteor-M No.2-1 satellite, the Meteor-M No.2-2 (also known as Meteor M2-2) was launched from Vostochny Cosmodrome.

Altitude of Meteor M2-2 showing the December 18th incident

On 18 December 2019, image downlink from Meteor-M No.2-2 ceased. Tracking revealed the craft had suffered degradation in orbit with a 2 km (1.2 mi) decrease in perigee. NORAD was not able to identify any space object involved in a collision. Roscosmos later confirmed that the satellite had suffered a decompression of its thermal control system following what is presumed to be a micrometeoroid impact. Following the incident, the spacecraft was automatically switched into a low-power mode and ground operators worked to restore the satellite's orbit and orientation. By 25 December 2019, the satellite had resumed controlled flight, but the future of its mission remains uncertain.

More Meteor-M satellites are currently being developed. Meteor-M No.2-3 was successfully launched on 27 June 2023, with three more satellites in various stages of development. Meteor-M No.2-4 was successfully launched on 29 February 2024 at 05:43 UTC, while Meteor-M No.2-5 is scheduled to be launched later in 2024, and No.2-6 in 2025.

Meteor-M launches

Satellite	s/n	Launch date	NSSDC ID	SCN	Apogee	Perigee	Inclination	Period
Meteor-M No.1	1	17 September 2009	2014-037A	35865	824.9 km	822.2 km	98.6°	101.2 min
Meteor-M No.2	2	8 July 2014	1985-100A	40069	833.0 km	825.9 km	98.4°	101.3 min
Meteor-M No.2-1	3	27 November 2017	Launch failure					
Meteor-M No.2-2	4	5 July 2019	2019-038A	44387	819.6 km	819.3 km	98.8°	101.1 min
Meteor-M No.2-3	5	27 June 2023	2023-091A	57166	823.1 km	815.8 km	98.7°	101.1 min
Meteor-M No.2-4	5	29 February 2024	2024-039A	59051	830.4 km	819.7 km	98.6°	101.3 min

== See also ==
- Elektro–L, Russian geosynchronous meteorological satellites
