= Federal Service for Hydrometeorology and Environmental Monitoring =

Meteorological agency of Russia

- Федеральная служба по гидрометеорологии и мониторингу окружающей среды
- Service seal

- Service flag

Agency overview
- Formed: 9 March 2004
- Jurisdiction: Government of Russia
- Headquarters: 11 Predtechensky Lanes, Moscow, Russia; 55.759391681136044°N 37.56883446903728°E
- Agency executive: Igor Shumakov
- Parent agency: Ministry of Natural Resources and Environment
- Website: www.meteorf.gov.ru

The Federal Service for Hydrometeorology and Environmental Monitoring (Roshydromet; Russian: Федеральная служба по гидрометеорологии и мониторингу окружающей среды России (Росгидромет)) is a service in the Ministry of Natural Resources and Environment (Russia) which carries out the functions of state property management and provision of public services in the field of hydrometeorology and related areas, monitoring of environmental environment pollution, public oversight of the work on modification of meteorological and other geophysical processes.

== History ==
The date of creation of the Hydrometeorological Service of Russia is considered to be April 13 (25), 1834, when the Normal Magnetic Meteorological Observatory was established at the Mining Institute by decree of Emperor Nicholas I in St. Petersburg. Its establishment was the first step towards creating a regular network of geophysical observations in Russia.

Academician Adolph Theodor Kupffer was appointed the first head of the Hydrometeorological Service. On his initiative, in 1849 the Main Physical Observatory (GFO, now the Main Geophysical Observatory) was created, which was entrusted with the "production of physical observations and tests in an extensive form and generally for the study of Russia in physical terms." Until the formation of the Hydrometeorological Committee at the Council of People's Commissars of the USSR until 1929, the GFO served as the Hydrometeorological Service of Russia. It was he who owned the idea of organizing a network of meteorological stations in Russia. By 1856, 13 meteorological stations functioned in Russia, and by 1872 their number doubled. Subsequently, the number of stations grew steadily, and in 1914 it exceeded 3,000.

In the 19th century, departmental meteorological networks were created in the Russian Empire (stations of the Marine Ministry, Forestry Department and the Department of Agriculture, a rain gauge network of the Ministry of Railways, a network of the Ural, Kharkov and Odessa Society of Naturalists). In addition, a network of the Finnish Scientific Society (22 stations), a network of the Livonian General Useful and Economic Society (183 stations, including rain gauges), a network of the Warsaw Society for the Promotion of Industry and Trade (32 stations), western (115 rain gauge points), eastern, Dnieper, southwest network.

In 1884, Academician M. A. Rykachev prepared a draft "Program for the Organization of Meteorological Observations", which provides for the creation of a single instruction for all stations of any submission, which were supposed to make observations with instruments that were verified and compared with normal instruments of HFO. This plan was finally realized by the author himself, who headed the GFO from 1895 to 1913. Since 1892, the Meteorological Monthly has been published by the Main Physical Observatory. In 1913, on the proposal of Academician M. A. Rykachev, the State Council prepared a law regarding the Hydrometeorological Service, which allowed to significantly increase its funding and capabilities. The law provided for the creation of 150 permanent and 50 supporting new stations. The implementation of the law allowed to significantly strengthen the position of the GFO as the central meteorological institution of Russia. At the same time, under this law, the hydrometeorology service was economically separated from the Academy of Sciences and was subordinate to the Ministry of Education.

During the First World War, the Main Military Directorate was created, from which the Hydrometeorological Service of the Armed Forces of the country, the hydrometeorological services of individual branches of the armed forces originate. The Russian Civil War caused great damage to the observation network. 1072 stations in the European part of Russia and 461 stations in Siberia ceased operation. In 1918, the HFO received reports from only 17 stations in the country and not a single report from abroad.

== Responsibilities ==
- State oversight of the work on modification of meteorological and other geophysical processes on the territory of the Russian Federation;
- Licensing of certain activities within the competence of the Service in accordance with the laws of the Russian Federation;
- State records of surface water and maintenance of public water inventory in terms of surface water bodies;
- Maintenance of the Uniform State Fund data on the state of the environment and its pollution;
- The formation and maintenance of the state monitoring network, including the organization and the termination of fixed and mobile observation points and the determination of their location;
- State monitoring of ambient air

== Organization ==
Federal Service for Hydrometeorology and Environmental Monitoring has 17 research institutes, two of them have the status of the State Research Centre (Hydrometeorological Centre of Russia and the Arctic and Antarctic Research Institute).
