= All-Russian Scientific Research Institute of Electromechanics =

Russian Satellite Manufacturer

- Founded: 1941
- Founder: Andronik Iosifyan
- Headquarters: Moscow, Russia
- Parent: Roscosmos
- Website: www.vniiem.ru

All-Russian Scientific Research Institute Of Electromechanics (VNIIEM; Russian: ВНИИЭМ) is a research institute based in Moscow, Russia. It is currently a Roscosmos subsidiary.

VNIIEM designs and builds automated satellites for ecological, geological, meteorological observation. It developed the Meteor and Resurs-O series of satellites and operates them in concert with the Planeta Design Bureau. VNIIEM developed the Geosynchronous Orbit Meteorological Satellite. In addition, the institute has developed the control and navigation systems, as well as analog computers, used on meteorological satellites. Andronik Iosifyan was the first director of VNIIEM.
