= Meridian 6 =

Russian military communications satellite

- Mission type: Communication
- COSPAR ID: 2012-063A
- SATCAT no.: 38995

Spacecraft properties
- Manufacturer: ISS Reshetnev

Start of mission
- Launch date: 14 November 2012, 11:42 UTC
- Rocket: Soyuz 2.1a/Fregat
- Launch site: Plesetsk 43/4

Orbital parameters
- Reference system: Geocentric
- Regime: Molniya
- Semi-major axis: 26,737 kilometres (16,614 mi)
- Eccentricity: 0.7220
- Perigee altitude: 1,006 kilometres (625 mi)
- Apogee altitude: 39,362 kilometres (24,458 mi)
- Inclination: 62.73 degrees
- Period: 718.04 minutes
- Epoch: 29 November 2012

Meridian 6 (Russian: Меридиан-6), also known as Meridian No.16L, is a Russian military communications satellite, one of the Meridian series. It is designed to carry military communications traffic and is a replacement for the Molniya satellites. In common with the earlier satellites these craft are in molniya orbits, a highly elliptical orbit named after the earlier satellites and giving good coverage of northern Russia.

== Meridian ==
Meridian satellites are the replacement for older Soviet molniya satellites, and some authors think some functions of the parus satellites. It was constructed by ISS Reshetnev and is believed to be based on the Uragan-M satellite bus, which has also been used for GLONASS navigation satellites. The first Meridian satellite was launched in 2006 and two of the six launched up to end of 2012 have failed - Meridian 2 due a problem with the Fregat upper stage and Meridian 5 due to a problem with the third-stage motor.

The satellites are believed to have a pressurised bus and a three-axis control system. They are manufactured by PO Polyot on behalf of ISS Reshetnev. They have the GRAU index 14F112.

== Launch ==
Meridian was launched on 14 November 2012 from Plesetsk Cosmodrome launchpad 43/4 by a Soyuz-2.1a rocket with a Fregat upper stage. It was launched at 11:42 UTC and the satellite and upper stage separated from the rocket at 11:51 UTC. The satellite was then released from the upper stage into a molniya orbit at 14:00 UTC. It was given the international designator 2012-063A and the United States Space Command assigned it the Satellite Catalog Number 38995.

The launch was attended by newly appointed Russian defence minister Sergei Shoigu in his first visit to the troops since being appointed on 6 November 2012.
