= Resurs-P =

Series of Russian commercial Earth observation satellites

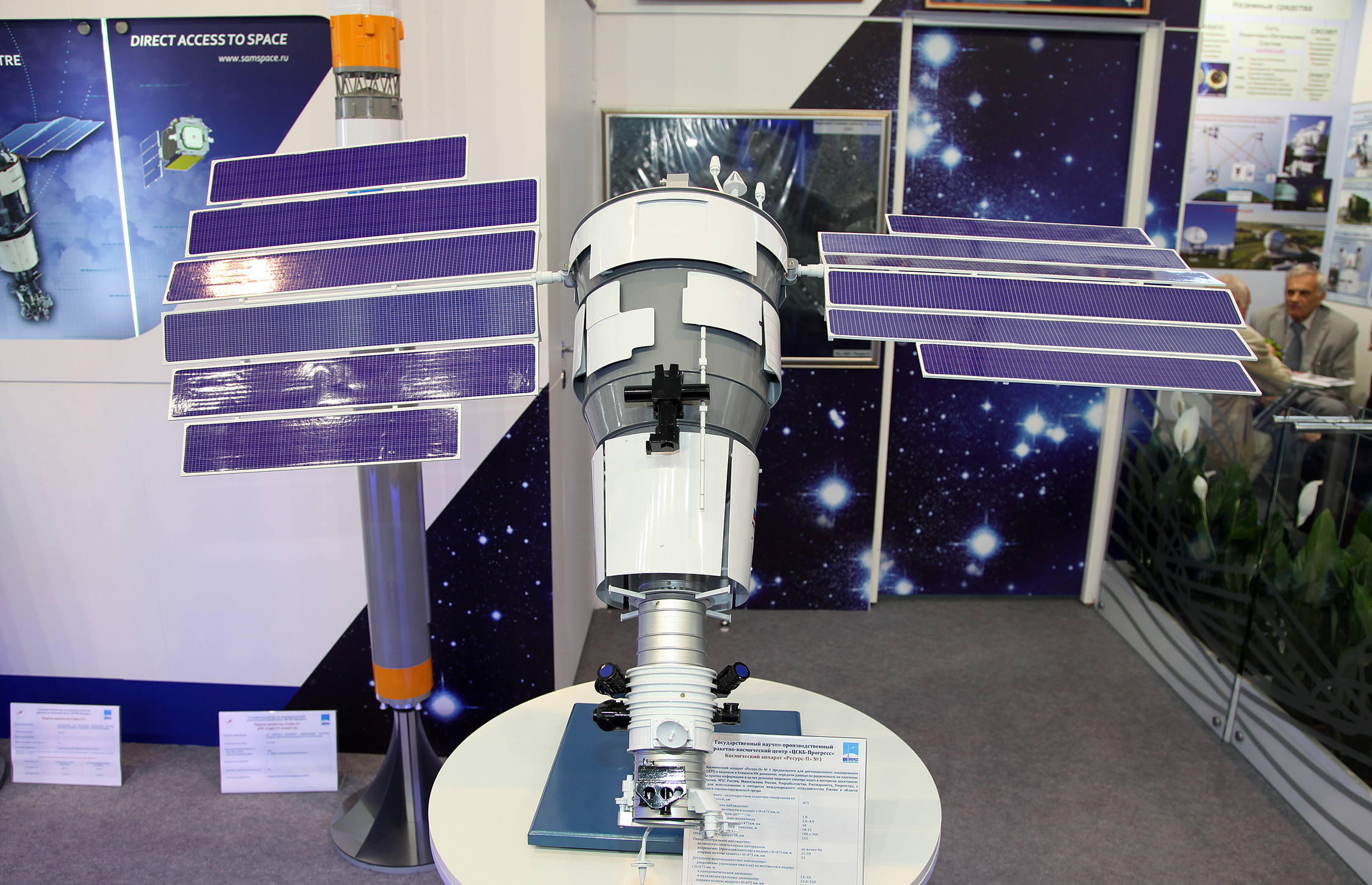
- Designer: TsSKB-Progress
- Country of origin: Russia
- Operator: Roscosmos
- Applications: Earth observation

Specifications
- Bus: Yantar (satellite)
- Launch mass: 6,570 kg (14,480 lb)
- Regime: SSO
- Design life: 5 years

Production
- On order: 0
- Built: 5
- Launched: 5
- Operational: 2
- Retired: 3
- Maiden launch: 2013-06-25

Resurs-P (Russian: Ресурс-П (перспективный), lit. 'Resource-P (Prospecting)') is a series of Russian commercial Earth observation satellites capable of acquiring high-resolution hyperspectral (HSI), wide-field multispectral (MSI), and panchromatic imagery. These spacecraft cost over 5 billion rubles and are operated by Roscosmos replacing the Resurs-DK No.1 satellite.

Imagery collected by Resurs-P satellites are used by the Russian Ministries of Agriculture, Fishing, Meteorology, Transportation, Emergencies, Natural Resources, and Defense for map making, environmental control, agricultural monitoring, hydrology, measuring soil salinity, and searching for potential oil or mineral deposits. The Russian Ministry of Defense also used the satellite for military purposes to include surveying terrain in support of operations in Syria.

In December 2021 it was announced that a new series, Resurs-PM, would replace the Resurs-P series with a first launch in 2023 or 2024.

As of January 2022, only one of the three launched Resurs-P satellites remain active, Resurs-P No.3. At least two more satellites of the series are planned, with the satellite No.4 undergoing testing and the satellite No.5 being assembled and expected to be delivered to the launch site in 2023.

On March 31, 2024, Russia launched its fourth Resurs-P satellite into space, the Russian Soyuz 2.1b rocket carrying the high-detail Earth observation satellite No. 4 Resurs-P was launched from the Baikonur Cosmodrome, located in Kazakhstan.

== Sensors ==
=== Geoton-L1 Multispectral Imager ===
Resurs-P's primary payload is the Geoton-L1 high-resolution MSI imager with a 38 km swath (at 475 kilometer altitude), 1.0 meter panchromatic resolution, and 3–4 meter color resolution using push-broom scanning. Geoton-L1 MSI collects visible (VIS) and near-infrared (NIR) light in six wavebands:

- 0.58–0.80 μm (VIS yellow to NIR)
- 0.45–0.52 μm (VIS blue to VIS green)
- 0.52–0.60 μm (VIS green)
- 0.61–0.68 μm (VIS red)
- 0.72–0.80 μm (VIS red to NIR)
- 0.80–0.90 μm (NIR)

=== KshMSA Wide-Angle Multispectral Imager Complex ===
Also onboard is the KShMSA (Russian: комплекс широкозахватной мультиспектральной аппаратуры (КШМСА), romanized: kompleks shirokozakhvatnoy mul'tispektral'noy apparatury lit. 'complex of wide-coverage multispectral apparatuses'). KShMSA's mass is 19.7 kilograms and consumes 41 watts.

KShMSA consists of a control unit, high-resolution camera (ShMSA-VR), and medium resolution camera (ShMSA-SR). Both cameras, developed by NPP Opteks, have six spectral channels, five multispectral channels across the visible and NIR spectra and one panchromatic (PAN):

- 0.43–0.70 μm (PAN)
- 0.43–0.51 μm (VIS blue)
- 0.51–0.58 μm (VIS green)
- 0.60–0.70 μm (VIS red)
- 0.70–0.90 μm (NIR 1)
- 0.80–0.90 μm (NIR 2)

Distinctive features of the KshMSA are the use quick lenses and a single charge-coupled device (CCD) photodetector to provide a seamless image and high geometric accuracy. KShMSA enables the use of collected imagery to be used for creating topographic maps, monitoring agricultural and forest lands, detection of forest fires, and monitoring flood-prone regions. The lenses of both cameras were produced by the Lytkarino Optical Glass Plant in Lytkarino, Russia specifically for Resurs-P.

The two cameras output 12-bit video information accompanied by onboard timing information and associated metadata to the onboard storage device over a fiber-optic interface where the imagery and data can be transmitted to a ground station.

==== ShMSA-VR High-Resolution, Wide-Angle Multispectral Imager ====
The high-resolution (Russian: высокого разрешения or ВР, romanized 'VR') camera collects over a 96 kilometer swath (at 475 kilometer altitude) using a P-200 lens with a relative aperture of 1:3 and a focal length of 200 millimeters.

==== ShMSA-SR Medium-Resolution, Wide-Angle Multispectral Imager ====
The medium-resolution (Russian: среднего разрешения or СР, romanized 'SR') camera collects over a 480 kilometer swath (at 475 kilometer altitude) using a TM-40 lens with a relative aperture of 1:4 and a focal length of 40mm.

=== GSA Hyperspectral Apparatus ===
The GSA hyperspectral apparatus (Russian: Гиперспектральная аппаратура or ГСА, lit. Hyperspectral Apparatus or 'GSA') is the product of collaboration between NPP Opteks, former State Scientific Research and Production Center (TsSKB, now a part of Roscosmos), and optics producer Krasnogorsky Zavod.

GSA collects in 216 spectral channels with a spectral resolution between 5–10 nanometers and a spatial resolution of 30 meters over a 30 kilometer swath (all at nadir and 475 kilometer altitude) at 14 bits per pixel. The spectral range of GSA is between 0.4 μm and 1.1 μm which spans the visible spectrum and nearly half of the near-infrared spectrum.

=== AIS Receiver ===
All Resurs-P satellites carry an Automatic Identification System (AIS) receiver to track maritime vessels.

=== Noronas-Nuklon High-Energy Particle Detector ===
The second satellite of the series, Resurs-P No.2 was uniquely chosen to carry the Koronas-Nuklon high-energy particle detector as a secondary payload for the Research Institute of Nuclear Physics of Moscow State University. The detector absorbs cosmic ray nuclei in the 1 to 1,000 TeV energy range and was originally planned to be independently deployed on a free-flying satellite of its own but the plans for the satellite were cancelled and the sensor instead put on Resurs-P No.2. This collection concluded with Resurs-P No.2's withdrawal from orbit.

== Spacecraft ==
The Resurs-P spacecraft was built by the Russian space company TsSKB Progress in Samara, Russia. It is a modified version of the military reconnaissance satellite Yantar-4KS1 (Terilen). The spacecraft is three-axis stabilized. The design lifetime is no less than five years. The ground location accuracy is 10 metres (33 ft). The maximum daily imaging area is 1,000,000 square kilometres (390,000 sq mi) and the spacecraft has a 3-day revisit rate.

== Satellites ==
All Resurs-P satellites are launched from Baikonur Cosmodrome in Kazakhstan on a Soyuz-2.1b.

English name	Russian name	Launch Date	Orbit Entry	Flight Number	SCN	Operational Status
Resurs-P No.1	«Ресурс-П» No. 1	25 June 2013	21:28:48	2013-030A	39186	Decommissioned in orbit 3.5 years after expected service life due to onboard equipment failure. The satellite disintegrated on June 26, 2024, leaving over 100 trackable pieces of orbital debris. Satellite decayed from orbit 18 November 2024.
Resurs-P No.2	«Ресурс-П» No. 2	26 December 2014	21:55	2014-087A	40360	Decommissioned in orbit due to critical, post-launch issues; went out of order in 2016 and 2017 due to thermal control system and onboard computer faults; despite repeated fixes, satellite "didn't work even half the time." The satellite re-entered the atmosphere 12 February 2025.
Resurs-P No.3	«Ресурс-П» No. 3	13 March 2016	21:56	2016-016A	41386	Operational 3 years after expected service life. Previously under review for decommissioning from 2017 to April 2022 due to downlink transmitter failures; system functioned for "only five months out of the prescribed five years"; one of the solar arrays failed to open for first ten days. Decayed from orbit on 17 October 2023.
Resurs-P No.4	«Ресурс-П» No. 4	31 March 2024	12:36:45	2024-061A	59371	Launched into orbit in March 2024; put into operation in June 2024.
Resurs-P No.5	«Ресурс-П» No. 5	25 December 2024	10:45:42	2024-250A	62430	Launched into orbit on 25 December 2024.

== Anticipated replacement by Resurs-PM ==
In December 2021, The Progress Rocket and Space Center of Roscosmos announced to leading Russian state-owned news agency TASS that they were manufacturing new Resurs-PM satellites to succeed the Resurs-P satellite series and were projecting the first launch in 2023 or 2024. According to the manufacturer, the new Resurs-PM series will have an imaging resolution of 0.4 meters — an improvement from the current 1 meter maximum resolution.

In mid-April 2022, The Department of Optical and Physical Research of the Russian Academy of Sciences' Space Research Institute announced its completion of the next-generation of star trackers necessary for satellite orientation on board the developing Resurs-PM. The department claims the new device, BOKZ-MR, after seven years of development, are 5–10 times better than the previous model aboard the Resurs-P series satellites and is the "most high-precision instrument in the world" with improved information update frequency, range of operating angular velocities, and noise immunity. Developers claim its measurement characteristics are 0.4 fractions of an arc second, and, as of April, 20 devices had been manufactured, tested, and delivered to the Resurs-PM assembly teams.

As of December 2022, the launches of the first two Resurs-PM satellites are planned for 2024 and 2025 respectively.

== See also ==
- Resurs-P No.1
- Resurs-P No.2
- Resurs-P No.3
- Persona (satellite)
