= Resurs-P No.2 =

Russian Earth observation satellite (2014–2025)

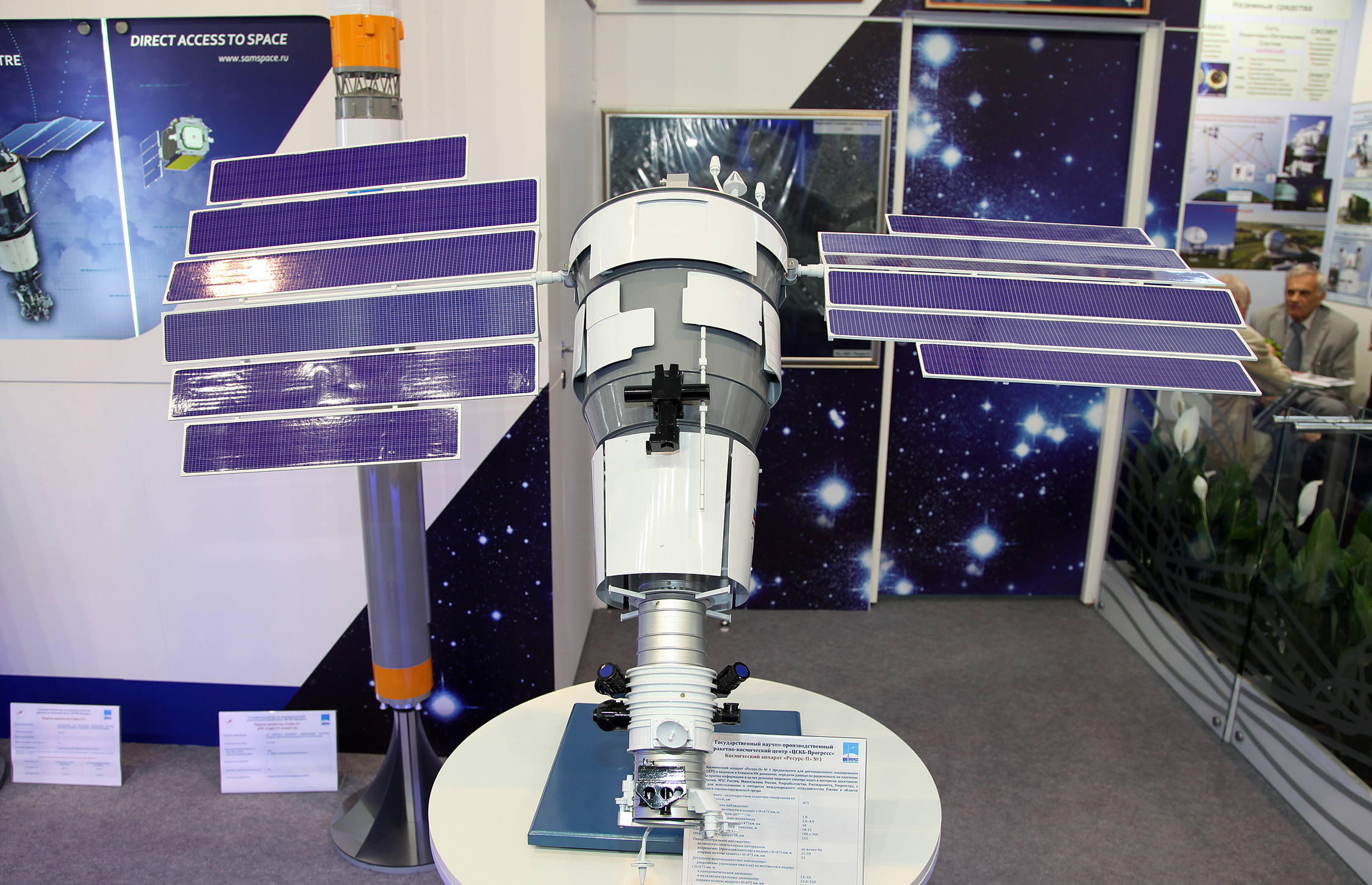
- Mission type: Earth observation
- Operator: Roskosmos
- COSPAR ID: 2014-087A
- SATCAT no.: 40360
- Mission duration: Planned: 5 years Achieved: 10 years, 1 month, 16 days

Spacecraft properties
- Spacecraft type: Resurs-P
- Bus: Yantar
- Manufacturer: TsSKB Progress
- Launch mass: 6,392 kilograms (14,092 lb)
- Dimensions: 7.93 by 2.72 metres (26.0 ft × 8.9 ft)

Start of mission
- Launch date: 26 December 2014, 18:55:50 UTC
- Rocket: Soyuz-2.1b
- Launch site: Baikonur Cosmodrome Site 31/6

End of mission
- Disposal: Decay from orbit
- Decay date: 12 February 2025, 22:33

Orbital parameters
- Reference system: Geocentric
- Regime: Sun-synchronous
- Perigee altitude: 468 kilometres (291 mi)
- Apogee altitude: 477 kilometres (296 mi)
- Inclination: 97.29 degrees
- Period: 93.91 minutes
- Epoch: 25 January 2015, 06:03:01 UTC

Instruments
- Geoton-L1, GSA, ShMSA, Koronas-Nuklon

Resurs-P No.2 was a Russian commercial Earth observation satellite capable of acquiring high-resolution imagery (resolution up to 1.0 m). The spacecraft was operated by Roscosmos along with the Resurs-P No.1 satellite.

The satellite was designed for multi-spectral remote sensing of the Earth's surface aimed at acquiring high-quality visible images in near real-time as well as on-line data delivery via radio link and providing a wide range of consumers with value-added processed data.

Additionally the satellite carried the Nuklon high-energy particle detector developed by the Moscow State University for detecting cosmic radiation.

Decommissioned in orbit due to critical, post-launch issues; went out of order in 2016 and 2017 due to thermal control system and onboard computer faults; despite repeated fixes, satellite "didn't work even half the time."

The satellite re-entered the atmosphere on 11 February 2025.

== See also ==
- 2014 in spaceflight
- Resurs-P
