= Meridian 4 =

Russian military communications satellite

- Mission type: Communications
- Operator: VKS (2011); VKO (2012-)
- COSPAR ID: 2011-018A
- SATCAT no.: 37398

Spacecraft properties
- Spacecraft type: Meridian
- Manufacturer: ISS Reshetnev

Start of mission
- Launch date: 4 May 2011, 17:41:33 UTC
- Rocket: Soyuz-2-1a/Fregat
- Launch site: Plesetsk 43/4

Orbital parameters
- Reference system: Geocentric
- Regime: Molniya
- Perigee altitude: 1,418 kilometres (881 mi)
- Apogee altitude: 38,948 kilometres (24,201 mi)
- Inclination: 64.39 degrees
- Period: 717.75 minutes
- Epoch: 3 July 2014, 23:30:26 UTC

Meridian 4 (Russian: Меридиан-4), also known as Meridian No.14L, is a Russian military communications satellite. It was launched atop a Soyuz-2-1a/Fregat rocket from the Plesetsk Cosmodrome in May 2011.

It is the fourth satellite to be launched as part of the Meridian system to replace the older Molniya series. It was constructed by ISS Reshetnev and is believed to be based on the Uragan-M satellite bus, which has also been used for GLONASS navigation satellites.

Meridian satellites are launched into highly elliptical Molniya orbits to provide communications coverage of the Northern Hemisphere for the Russian military.

== See also ==
- 2011 in spaceflight
