= Meridian 3 =

- Mission type: Communications
- Operator: VKS
- COSPAR ID: 2010-058A
- SATCAT no.: 37212

Spacecraft properties
- Manufacturer: ISS Reshetnev

Start of mission
- Launch date: 02 November 2010
- Rocket: Soyuz-2.1a/Fregat-M
- Launch site: Plesetsk 43/4

Orbital parameters
- Reference system: Geocentric
- Regime: Molniya
- Semi-major axis: 26,556 kilometres (16,501 mi)
- Eccentricity: 0.6782
- Perigee altitude: 2,165 kilometres (1,345 mi)
- Apogee altitude: 38,191 kilometres (23,731 mi)
- Inclination: 62.83 degrees
- Period: 717 minutes
- Epoch: 27 July 2014

Meridian 3 (Russian: Меридиан-3), also known as Meridian No.13L, was a Russian communications satellite. It was the third satellite to be launched as part of the Meridian system to replace the older Molniya series.

Meridian 3 was launched by a Soyuz-2 rocket. The Soyuz-2.1a configuration was used, along with a Fregat-M upper stage. The launch occurred from Site 43/4 at the Plesetsk Cosmodrome at 00:58:39 GMT on 2 November 2010.

It was constructed by ISS Reshetnev and is believed to be based on the Uragan-M satellite bus, which has also been used for GLONASS navigation satellites. It operates in a Molniya orbit with a perigee of 900 kilometres (560 mi), an apogee of 39,000 kilometres (24,000 mi), and 65° inclination.
