= 5th meridian =

5th meridian may refer to:

- 5th meridian east, a line of longitude east of the Greenwich Meridian
- 5th meridian west, a line of longitude west of the Greenwich Meridian
- The Fifth principal meridian in Arkansas, Iowa, Minnesota, Mississippi, North Dakota and South Dakota, United States, 91°03'42" west of Greenwich
- The Fifth Meridian of the Dominion Land Survey in Canada, 114° west of Greenwich
- Meridian 5; the fifth satellite in the Meridian series of communications satellites
