= 2nd meridian =

2nd meridian may refer to:

- 2nd meridian east, a line of longitude east of the Greenwich Meridian
- 2nd meridian west, a line of longitude west of the Greenwich Meridian
- The Second Principal Meridian in Illinois and Indiana, United States, 86°28' west of Greenwich
- The Second Meridian of the Dominion Land Survey in Canada, 102° west of Greenwich
- Meridian 2, a Russian communications satellite
