= PAMELA detector =

Cosmic ray research module

PAMELA

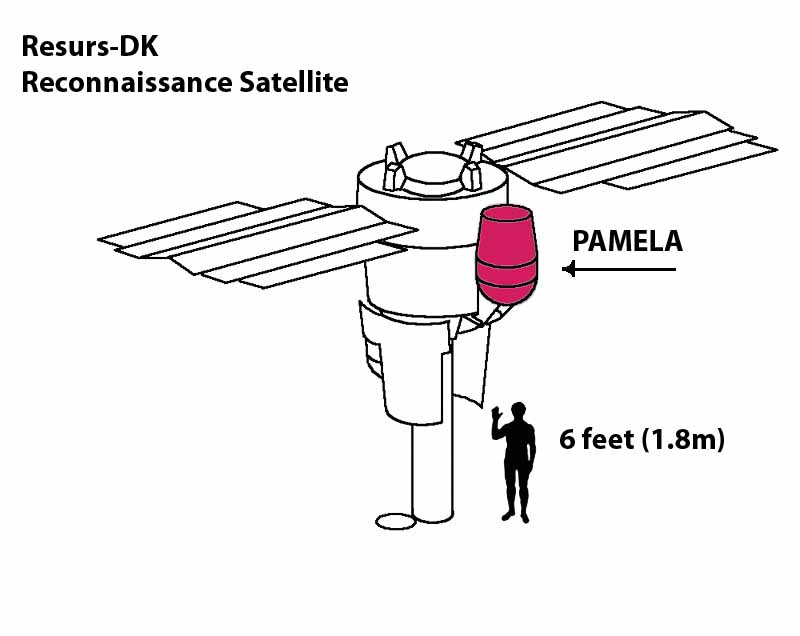
- Organization: PAMELA group
- Mission Type: Cosmic Ray
- Host Satellite: Resurs DK1
- Launch: 15 June 2006
- Launch vehicle: Soyuz-FG
- Launch site: Baikonur Cosmodrome
- Mission duration: 3 years (planned), 9 years, 7 months and 23 days (achieved)
- Mission end: 7 February 2016
- Mass: 470 kg
- Max length: 1300 mm
- Power consumption: 335 Watts
- Webpage: PAMELA homepage

Orbital elements (Resurs DK1)
- Inclination: 70 degrees
- Orbit: quasi-polar elliptical
- Min altitude: 360 km
- Max altitude: 604 km
- Period: 94.02 min

PAMELA (Payload for Antimatter Matter Exploration and Light-nuclei Astrophysics) was a cosmic ray research module attached to an Earth orbiting satellite. PAMELA was launched on 15 June 2006 and was the first satellite-based experiment dedicated to the detection of cosmic rays, with a particular focus on their antimatter component, in the form of positrons and antiprotons. Other objectives included long-term monitoring of the solar modulation of cosmic rays, measurements of energetic particles from the Sun, high-energy particles in Earth's magnetosphere and Jovian electrons. It was also hoped that it may detect evidence of dark matter annihilation. PAMELA operations were terminated in 2016, as were the operations of the host-satellite Resurs-DK1. The experiment was a recognized CERN experiment (RE2B).

== Development and launch ==
PAMELA was the largest device up to the time built by the Wizard collaboration, which includes Russia, Italy, Germany and Sweden and has been involved in many satellite and balloon-based cosmic ray experiments such as Fermi-GLAST. The 470 kg, US$32 million (EU€24.8 million, UK£16.8 million) instrument was originally projected to have a three-year mission. However, this durable module remained operational and made significant scientific contributions until 2016.

PAMELA is mounted on the upward-facing side of the Resurs-DK1 Russian satellite. It was launched by a Soyuz rocket from Baikonur Cosmodrome on 15 June 2006. PAMELA has been put in a polar elliptical orbit at an altitude between 350 and 610 km, with an inclination of 70°.

== Design ==
The apparatus is 1.3 m high, has a total mass of 470 kg and a power consumption of 335 W. The instrument is built around a permanent magnet spectrometer with a silicon microstrip tracker that provides rigidity and dE/dx information. At its bottom is a silicon-tungsten imaging calorimeter, a neutron detector and a shower tail scintillator to perform lepton/hadron discrimination. A Time of Flight (ToF), made of three layers of plastic scintillators, is used to measure the velocity and charge of the particle. An anticounter system made of scintillators surrounding the apparatus is used to reject false triggers and albedo particles during off-line analysis.

Sensitivity
Particle	Energy Range
Antiproton flux	80 MeV – 190 GeV
Positron flux	50 MeV – 270 GeV
Electron flux	up to 400 GeV
Proton flux	up to 700 GeV
Electron/positron flux	up to 2 TeV
Light nuclei (up to Z=6)	up to 200 GeV/n
Light isotopes (D, 3He)	up to 1 GeV/n
Antinuclei search	sensitivity better than 10^{−7} antiHe/He

== Results ==
Preliminary data (released August 2008, ICHEP Philadelphia) indicate an excess of positrons in the range 10–60 GeV. This is thought to be a possible sign of dark matter annihilation: hypothetical WIMPs colliding with and annihilating each other to form gamma rays, matter and antimatter particles. Another explanation considered for the indication mentioned above is the production of electron-positron pairs on pulsars with subsequent acceleration in the vicinity of the pulsar.

The first two years of data were released in October 2008 in three publications. The positron excess was confirmed and found to persist up to 90 GeV. Surprisingly, no excess of antiprotons was found. This is inconsistent with predictions from most models of dark matter sources, in which the positron and antiproton excesses are correlated.

A paper, published on 15 July 2011, confirmed earlier speculation that the Van Allen belt could confine a significant flux of antiprotons produced by the interaction of the Earth's upper atmosphere with cosmic rays. The energy of the antiprotons has been measured in the range of 60–750 MeV. Cosmic rays collide with atoms in the upper atmosphere creating antineutrons, which in turn decay to produce the antiprotons. They were discovered in a part of the Van Allen belt closest to Earth. When an antiproton interacts with a normal particle, both are annihilated. Data from PAMELA indicated that these annihilation events occurred a thousand times more often than would be expected in the absence of antimatter. The data that contained evidence of antimatter were gathered between July 2006 and December 2008.

Boron and carbon flux measurements were published in July 2014, important to explaining trends in cosmic ray positron fraction.

The summary document of the operations of PAMELA was published in 2017.

In 2017, data from the HAWC Collaboration indicated that the increase in flux of positrons from the two nearest pulsars (Geminga and Monogem) is roughly equivalent to the excess originally observed by PAMELA.

== Sources of error ==
Between 1 and 100 GeV, PAMELA is exposed to one hundred times as many electrons as antiprotons. At 1 GeV there are one thousand times as many protons as positrons and at 100 GeV ten thousand times as many. Therefore, to correctly determine the antimatter abundances, it is critical that PAMELA is able to reject the matter background. The PAMELA collaboration claimed in "The electron hadron separation performance of the PAMELA electromagnetic calorimeter" that less than one proton in 100,000 is able to pass the calorimeter selection and be misidentified as a positron when the energy is less than 200 GeV.

The ratio of matter to antimatter in cosmic rays of energy less than 10 GeV that reach PAMELA from outside the Solar System depends on solar activity and in particular on the point in the 11 year solar cycle. The PAMELA team has invoked this effect to explain the discrepancy between their low energy results and those obtained by CAPRICE, HEAT and AMS-01, which were collected during that half of the cycle when the solar magnetic field had the opposite polarity.

These results are consistent with the series of positron / electron measurements obtained by AESOP, which has spanned coverage over both polarities. Also the PAMELA experiment has contradicted an earlier claim by the HEAT experiment of anomalous positrons in the 6 GeV to 10 GeV range.

== See also ==
- AMS-02 is a high energy physics experiment mounted to the exterior of the International Space Station featuring advanced particle identification and large acceptance of 0.3m2sr. AMS-02 has been in operation since May 2011. More than 100 billion charged cosmic ray events were recorded by AMS so far.
