= Resurs-P No.1 =

Russian Earth observation satellite (2013–2021)

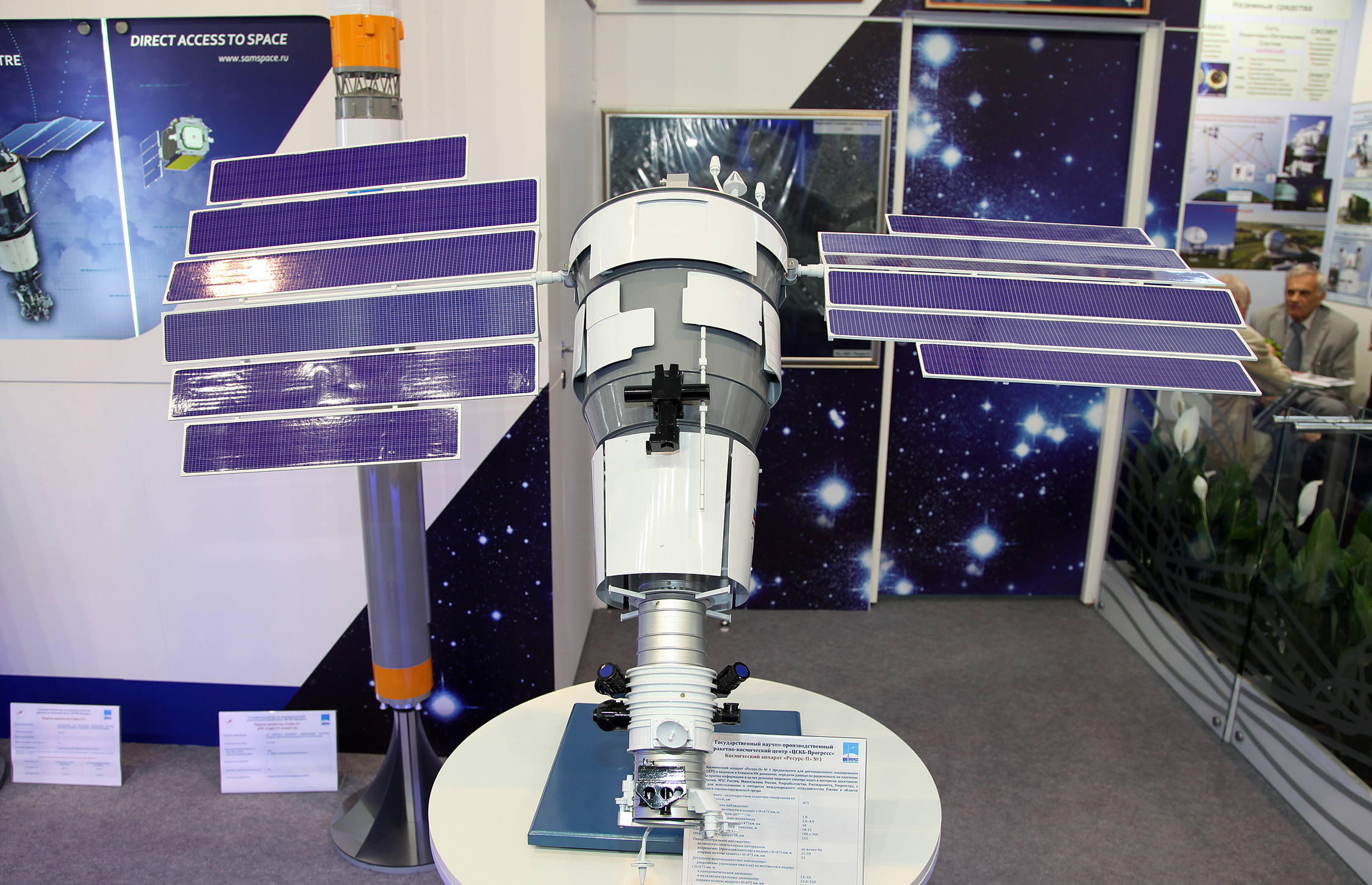
- Mission type: Earth observation
- Operator: Roskosmos
- COSPAR ID: 2013-030A
- SATCAT no.: 39186
- Website: (in Russian) www.mcc.rsa.ru/resurs_p.htm
- Mission duration: Planned: 5 years Final: 8 years and 6 months

Spacecraft properties
- Spacecraft type: Resurs-P
- Bus: Yantar
- Manufacturer: TsSKB Progress
- Launch mass: 6,570 kilograms (14,480 lb)
- Dimensions: 7.93 by 2.72 metres (26.0 ft × 8.9 ft)

Start of mission
- Launch date: 25 June 2013, 17:28:48 UTC
- Rocket: Soyuz-2-1b
- Launch site: Baikonur Cosmodrome 31/6

End of mission
- Deactivated: December 2021
- Decay date: 18 November 2024

Orbital parameters
- Reference system: Geocentric
- Regime: Sun-synchronous
- Perigee altitude: 470 kilometres (290 mi)
- Apogee altitude: 480 kilometres (300 mi)
- Inclination: 97.28 degrees
- Epoch: Planned

Instruments
- Geoton-L1, GSA, ShMSA

Resurs-P No.1 was a Russian commercial Earth observation satellite capable of acquiring high-resolution imagery (resolution up to 1.0 m). It was one of a series of Resurs-P spacecraft. The spacecraft was operated by Roscosmos as a replacement of the Resurs-DK No.1 satellite until it ceased operations in 2021. In 2024 the satellite broke up, releasing objects into low earth orbit which required the crew of the ISS to take shelter. The satellite decayed from orbit on 18 November 2024.

== Mission ==
The satellite was designed for multi-spectral remote sensing of the Earth's surface aimed at acquiring high-quality visible images in near real-time as well as on-line data delivery via radio link and providing a wide range of consumers with value-added processed data.

In January 2022 the general director of Progress Rocket Space Centre, Dimitriy Baranov, announced that the satellite had been decommissioned in December 2021 because of "the failure of onboard equipment".

Satellite decayed from orbit 18 November 2024.

== Breakup ==
Between June 26, 2024 at 13:05 UTC and June 27, 2024 at 00:51 UTC, Resurs-P1 released "a number of fragments" at an approximately 350 x 363 km Low Earth orbit according to debris-tracking service LeoLabs. United States Space Command later confirmed that Resurs-P1 had broken up into over 100 pieces of trackable space debris at approximately 16:00 UTC on 26 June 2024; LeoLabs later that afternoon announced that it was tracking 180 pieces of debris. Although there was no immediate threat to other satellites, because this orbit was close to that of the International Space Station its crew took shelter on the docked spacecraft for an hour as a precautionary measure.

This breakup likely happened because the satellite's passivation was not performed properly or performed at all. The use of an anti-satellite weapon was not in question since nothing of the sort was detected by any American or European assets.

== See also ==
- Resurs-P
