= Kosmos 2441 =

Russian reconnaissance satellite

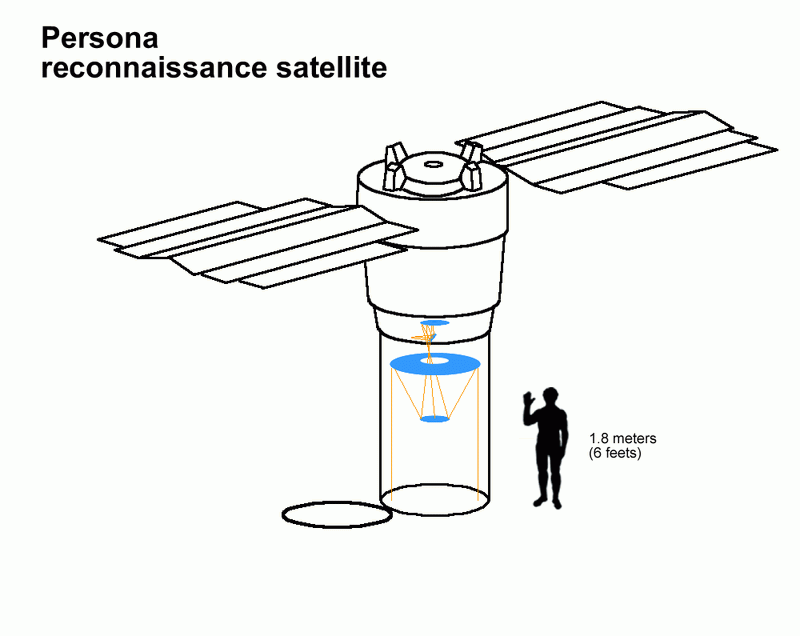
- Artist's impression of a Persona satellite
- Mission type: Reconnaissance
- Operator: VKS
- COSPAR ID: 2008-037A
- SATCAT no.: 33272
- Mission duration: 3-5 years (planned); ~2 months (achieved)

Spacecraft properties
- Spacecraft type: Persona
- Manufacturer: TsSKB Progress; LOMO; Vavilov State Optical Institute; NPO Opteks
- Launch mass: ~7,000 kilograms (15,000 lb)

Start of mission
- Launch date: 26 July 2008, 18:31:36 UTC
- Rocket: Soyuz-2-1b
- Launch site: Plesetsk 43/4

End of mission
- Last contact: ~September 2008

Orbital parameters
- Reference system: Geocentric
- Regime: Sun-synchronous
- Perigee altitude: 714 kilometres (444 mi)
- Apogee altitude: 732 kilometres (455 mi)
- Inclination: 98.3 degrees
- Epoch: 31 July 2008

Kosmos 2441 (Russian: Космос 2441 meaning Cosmos 2441), also known as Persona No.1, was a Russian optical reconnaissance satellite launched in 2008. The first Persona satellite, it failed a few months into its mission, which was scheduled to have lasted three to five years. It was the first Russian reconnaissance satellite to be placed into a Sun-synchronous orbit.

Kosmos 2441 was launched by a Soyuz-2-1b carrier rocket flying from Site 43/4 of the Plesetsk Cosmodrome. The launch took place at 18:31:36 UTC on 26 July 2008, and marked the first Soyuz-2-1b launch from Plesetsk. Following its successful deployment the satellite was given its Kosmos designation, and was assigned the International Designator 2008-037A and Satellite Catalog Number 33272.

In February 2009, it was reported that Kosmos 2441 had failed shortly after launch. The date of the failure was not announced, however the satellite was last seen to manoeuvre in September 2008. The cause of the failure was reported to be an electrical problem, possibly caused by higher radiation levels encountered by the satellite in sun-synchronous orbit compared to previous satellites in lower-inclination orbits. The next Persona satellite was not launched until 2013, when it was placed into orbit as Kosmos 2486.
