= Meridian 2 =

Russian communications satellite

- Mission type: Communications
- Operator: VKS
- COSPAR ID: 2009-029A
- SATCAT no.: 35008
- Mission duration: Launch failure

Spacecraft properties
- Manufacturer: ISS Reshetnev

Start of mission
- Launch date: 21 May 2009
- Rocket: Soyuz-2.1a/Fregat
- Launch site: Plesetsk 43/4
- Contractor: RVSN RF

End of mission
- Decay date: 23 April 2021, 04:48 UTC

Orbital parameters
- Reference system: Geocentric
- Regime: Molniya (planned)
- Perigee altitude: 1,277 kilometres (793 mi)
- Apogee altitude: 35,244 kilometres (21,900 mi)
- Inclination: 64.84 degrees
- Period: 641 minutes
- Epoch: 27 July 2014

Meridian 2 (Russian: Меридиан-2), also known as Meridian No.12L, was a Russian communications satellite. It was the second satellite of the Meridian system, which replaced the older Molniya series. It followed on from Meridian 1, which was launched in December 2006.

Meridian 2 was launched on a Soyuz-2.1a rocket with a Fregat upper stage, from Site 43/4 at the Plesetsk Cosmodrome. The launch occurred on 21 May 2009, at 21:53 GMT. While the launch was officially announced as successful, the satellite was placed in a significantly lower orbit than expected, and it was later reported that the upper stage of the Soyuz carrier rocket had shut down five seconds early, and an attempt to compensate for the low orbit resulted in the Fregat running out of fuel during its second burn. Following launch, it was reported to have been given a Kosmos designation; however, such a designation was never assigned. Molniya satellites intended for operational use were only assigned Kosmos designations if they were considered to have failed. If it had received a Kosmos designation, it would have been Kosmos 2451 (Russian: Космос 2451 meaning Cosmos 2451).

While the launch was originally considered to have been a partial failure, with the spacecraft able to correct its own orbit, it later emerged that the spacecraft could not reach a usable orbit, and the mission was declared a failure.

Meridian 2 was believed to have been based on the Uragan-M satellite bus, which has also been used for GLONASS navigation satellites. It was constructed by ISS Reshetnev. It was intended operate in a Molniya orbit with a perigee of 900 kilometres (560 mi), an apogee of 39,000 kilometres (24,000 mi), and 65° inclination.

Based on radio observations, Meridian 2 was known to downlink in the 278 MHz, 992 MHz-1002 MHz and 3.6 GHz bands.

On 23 April 2021, Meridian 2 naturally deorbited and burned up in the atmosphere.
