= Soyuz-2 =

Russian medium-lift launch rocket

Soyuz-2 (2.1a / 2.1b)
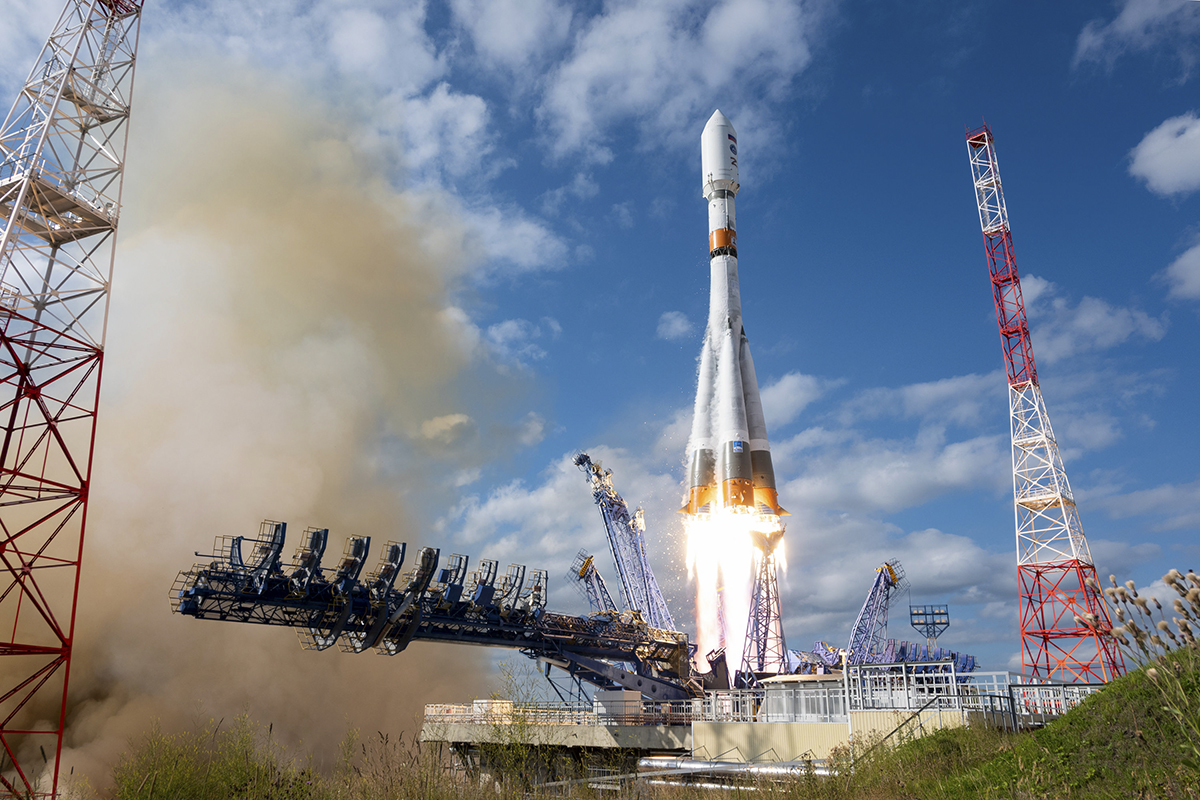
- A Soyuz‑2.1b rocket launches carrying a GLONASS-K2 satellite to orbit
- Function: Medium-lift launch vehicle
- Manufacturer: RKTs Progress
- Country of origin: Russia
- Cost per launch: US$35 million (2018, 2.1b without fourth stage)

Size
- Height: 46.3 m (152 ft)
- Diameter: 10.3 m (33 ft 10 in)
- Mass: 312,000 kg (688,000 lb)
- Stages: 3 or 4

Capacity

Payload to LEO
- Altitude: 240 km (150 mi)
- Orbital inclination: 51.6° from Baikonur and Vostochny; 72° from Plesetsk
- Mass: From Baikonur: A: 7,430 kg (16,380 lb); B: 8,670 kg (19,110 lb); From Plesetsk: A: 6,800 kg (15,000 lb); B: 7,730 kg (17,040 lb); From Vostochny: A: 7,460 kg (16,450 lb); B: 8,600 kg (19,000 lb)

Payload to Polar orbit
- Altitude: 240 km (150 mi)
- Orbital inclination: 98°
- Mass: From Baikonur: A: 5,830 kg (12,850 lb); B: 7,030 kg (15,500 lb); From Plesetsk: A: 6,130 kg (13,510 lb); B: 7,270 kg (16,030 lb); From Vostochny: A: 6,070 kg (13,380 lb); B: 7,260 kg (16,010 lb)

Payload to TLI (Note: with Fregat from Baikonur)
- Mass: B: 2,350 kg (5,180 lb)

Associated rockets
- Family: R-7 (Soyuz)
- Based on: Soyuz-FG
- Derivative work: Soyuz-ST; Soyuz-2.1v

Launch history
- Status: Active
- Launch sites: Baikonur, Site 31/6; Plesetsk, Sites 43/3 & 43/4; Vostochny, Site 1S
- Total launches: 172 (A: 82, B: 90)
- Success(es): 167 (A: 79, B: 88)
- Failure: 4 (A: 2, B: 2)
- Partial failure: 1 (A: 1, B: 0)
- First flight: A: 8 November 2004; B: 27 December 2006
- Last flight: A: 14 July 2026 (most recent); B: 14 November 2026 (most recent)
- Carries passengers or cargo: CoRoT; MetOp; GLONASS; Progress MS; Resurs-P; Arktika-M; Ionosfera-M; Meteor-M; Soyuz MS; OneWeb

Boosters (First stage) – Block B, V, G & D (Note: This is a transliteration of the second through fifth letters of the Cyrillic alphabet (Б, В, Г, Д). A sense-for-sense translation would correspond to the second through fifth letters of the Latin alphabet, 'Block B, C, D & E'.)
- No. boosters: 4
- Height: 19.6 m (64 ft 4 in)
- Diameter: 2.68 m (8 ft 10 in)
- Empty mass: 3,784 kg (8,342 lb)
- Gross mass: 44,413 kg (97,914 lb)
- Propellant mass: LOX: 27,900 kg (61,500 lb); RP-1: 11,260 kg (24,820 lb)
- Powered by: 1 × RD-107A
- Maximum thrust: SL: 838.5 kN (188,500 lb_{f}) vac: 1,021.3 kN (229,600 lb_{f})
- Specific impulse: SL: 262 s (2.57 km/s) vac: 319 s (3.13 km/s)
- Burn time: 118 seconds
- Propellant: LOX / RP-1

Second stage (core) – Block A
- Height: 27.1 m (88 ft 11 in)
- Diameter: 2.95 m (9 ft 8 in)
- Empty mass: 6,545 kg (14,429 lb)
- Gross mass: 99,765 kg (219,944 lb)
- Propellant mass: LOX: 63,800 kg (140,700 lb); RP-1: 26,300 kg (58,000 lb)
- Powered by: 1 × RD-108A
- Maximum thrust: SL: 792.5 kN (178,200 lb_{f}) vac: 990.2 kN (222,600 lb_{f})
- Specific impulse: SL: 255 s (2.50 km/s) vac: 319 s (3.13 km/s)
- Burn time: 286 seconds
- Propellant: LOX / RP-1

Third stage – Block I (Note: This is a transliteration of the tenth letter of the Cyrillic alphabet (И), which also carries the numerical value 10 in Cyrillic numerals. A sense-for-sense translation would use a Roman numeral, 'Block X'.)
- Height: 6.7 m (22 ft 0 in)
- Diameter: 2.66 m (8 ft 9 in)
- Empty mass: 2,355 kg (5,192 lb)
- Gross mass: 27,755 kg (61,189 lb)
- Propellant mass: LOX: 17,800 kg (39,200 lb); RP-1: 7,600 kg (16,800 lb)
- Powered by: A: 1 × RD-0110; B: 1 × RD-0124
- Maximum thrust: A: 298.03 kN (67,000 lb_{f}); B: 294.3 kN (66,200 lb_{f})
- Specific impulse: A: 325 s (3.19 km/s); B: 359 s (3.52 km/s)
- Burn time: A: 250 seconds B: 270 seconds
- Propellant: LOX / RP-1

Fourth stage (optional) – Fregat / Fregat-M
- Height: Fregat: 1.875 m (6 ft 1.8 in); Fregat-M: 1.945 m (6 ft 4.6 in)
- Diameter: Fregat: 3.44 m (11 ft 3 in); Fregat-M: 3.8 m (12 ft 6 in)
- Empty mass: Fregat: 945 kg (2,083 lb); Fregat-M: 1,035 kg (2,282 lb)
- Gross mass: Fregat: 6,235 kg (13,746 lb); Fregat-M: 7,640 kg (16,840 lb)
- Propellant mass: Fregat: 5,307 kg (11,700 lb); Fregat-M: 6,650 kg (14,660 lb)
- Powered by: 1 × S5.92
- Maximum thrust: 13.93–19.85 kN (3,130–4,460 lb_{f})
- Specific impulse: 320–333.2 s (3.14–3.27 km/s)
- Burn time: Up to 1,100 seconds (up to 7 starts)
- Propellant: N_{2}O_{4} / UDMH

Fourth stage (optional) – Volga
- Height: 1.025 m (3 ft 4.4 in)
- Diameter: 3.2 m (10 ft 6 in)
- Empty mass: 840 kg (1,850 lb)
- Propellant mass: 300–900 kg (660–1,980 lb)
- Powered by: 1 × 17D64
- Maximum thrust: 2.94 kN (660 lb_{f})
- Specific impulse: 307 s (3.01 km/s)
- Propellant: N_{2}O_{4} / UDMH

Soyuz‑2 (Russian: Союз‑2, lit. 'Union‑2', GRAU index: 14A14) is a series of Russian expendable medium-lift launch vehicles and the seventh major iteration of the Soyuz rocket family. Compared to its predecessors, Soyuz-2 features significant upgrades, including improved engines and a digital flight control system that enables launches from fixed platforms and supports larger payload fairings.

Developed and produced by the Progress Rocket Space Centre (RKTs Progress) in Samara, Soyuz-2 is used to place payloads into low Earth orbit in standard configuration but can also support missions to higher orbits using an additional upper stage, most commonly the Fregat, though the smaller Volga is available as a less expensive option. Since its introduction in 2004, Soyuz-2 has gradually replaced earlier Soyuz variants and is launched from the facilities of its R-7 derived predecessors: Site 31/6 at the Baikonur Cosmodrome in Kazakhstan and Sites 43/3 and 43/4 at the Plesetsk Cosmodrome in northwestern Russia, and, since 2016, Site 1S at the Vostochny Cosmodrome in eastern Russia.

The Soyuz‑2 family includes several variants. The base model, Soyuz‑2.1a, debuted on 8 November 2004, followed by the Soyuz‑2.1b, with a 15 percent more powerful third stage, on 27 December 2006. A derivative version, Soyuz‑ST, was introduced in 2011 with modifications for operation at the Guiana Space Centre, the European Space Agency's launch site in French Guiana. Launches from this site were suspended in 2022 following the Russian invasion of Ukraine.

== History ==
Development of the Soyuz-2 originated in the early 1990s as the "Rus" program led by RKTs Progress with support from the Government of Russia. Following the dissolution of the Soviet Union, the "Rus" program sought to consolidate Soyuz production within Russia, eliminate reliance on foreign-supplied components, and modernize the aging Soyuz-U and Molniya-M launch vehicles. These earlier rockets relied on a 1960s-era analog flight control system developed by the Ukrainian Polisvit Special Design Bureau.

Development of Soyuz-2 introduced a fully digital flight control system and upgraded engines. Work on the digital flight control system began in 1993 at NPO Avtomatiki in Yekaterinburg, incorporating triple-redundant computers and dual gyroscopes to improve reliability. The modernization program also included upgraded RD-107A and RD-108A engines for the boosters and core stage, featuring redesigned injectors that improved combustion efficiency and increased specific impulse by approximately 5 seconds (0.049 km/s), as well as the new RD-0124 third-stage engine employing an oxygen-rich staged combustion cycle. Together, these upgrades increased payload capacity by approximately 1,200 kilograms (2,600 lb).

Financial constraints during the late 1990s led to a phased implementation of the upgrades. The improved RD-107A and RD-108A engines were completed before the other planned improvements and entered service first on the transitional Soyuz-FG, while the new avionics and structural modifications debuted with Soyuz-2.1a. The RD-0124 engine was later introduced with Soyuz-2.1b.

Soyuz-2.1a made its maiden flight on 8 November 2004 from Plesetsk Cosmodrome on a suborbital test mission and entered operational service in October 2006 with the launch of MetOp-A. The first Soyuz-2.1b launched on 26 July 2008 from Plesetsk with a classified military payload. Between 2010 and 2019, the Soyuz-2 family gradually replaced the Molniya-M, Soyuz-U, and Soyuz-FG launch vehicles.

== Variants ==
=== Soyuz-2.1a ===
Soyuz-2.1a introduced the family's digital flight control system, replacing the analog system used on earlier Soyuz rockets. The new avionics were physically lighter, enabled in-flight trajectory adjustments, and supported larger payload fairings, permitting the launch of heavier commercial satellites. The variant also used the upgraded RD-107A and RD-108A engines. The third stage retained the RD-0110 engine used on earlier Soyuz family rockets, but adopted enlarged propellant tanks and a revised structure shared with Soyuz-2.1b. Together, these changes increased payload capacity by about 300 kilograms (660 lb).

=== Soyuz-2.1b ===
Soyuz-2.1b retains the upgrades introduced with the 2.1a and while replacing the third-stage RD-0110 with the more efficient RD-0124, an oxygen-rich staged-combustion engine, the engine increases specific impulse from 326 to 359 seconds (3.20 to 3.52 km/s). Although maximum thrust was slightly reduced from 298 to 294 kilonewtons (67,000 to 66,000 lb_{f}), extended burn time with the same propellant load improved overall performance. The enhanced third stage significantly increased payload capability. From the Baikonur Cosmodrome, payload capacity to low Earth orbit rose from approximately 7,430 kilograms (16,380 lb) for the 2.1a to 8,670 kilograms (19,110 lb) for the 2.1b.

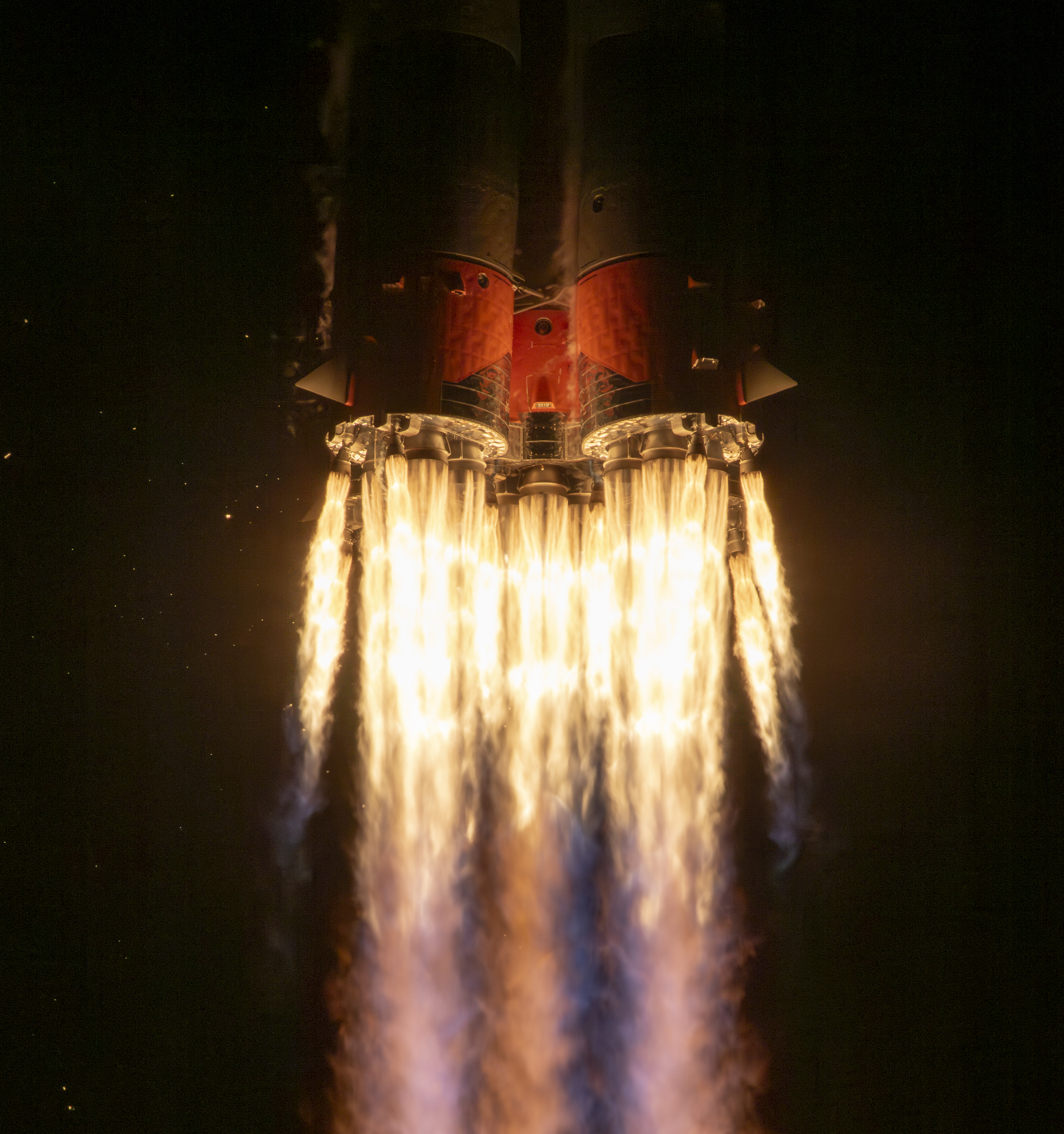
Closeup of booster and core stage engines of a Soyuz‑2.1a during launch

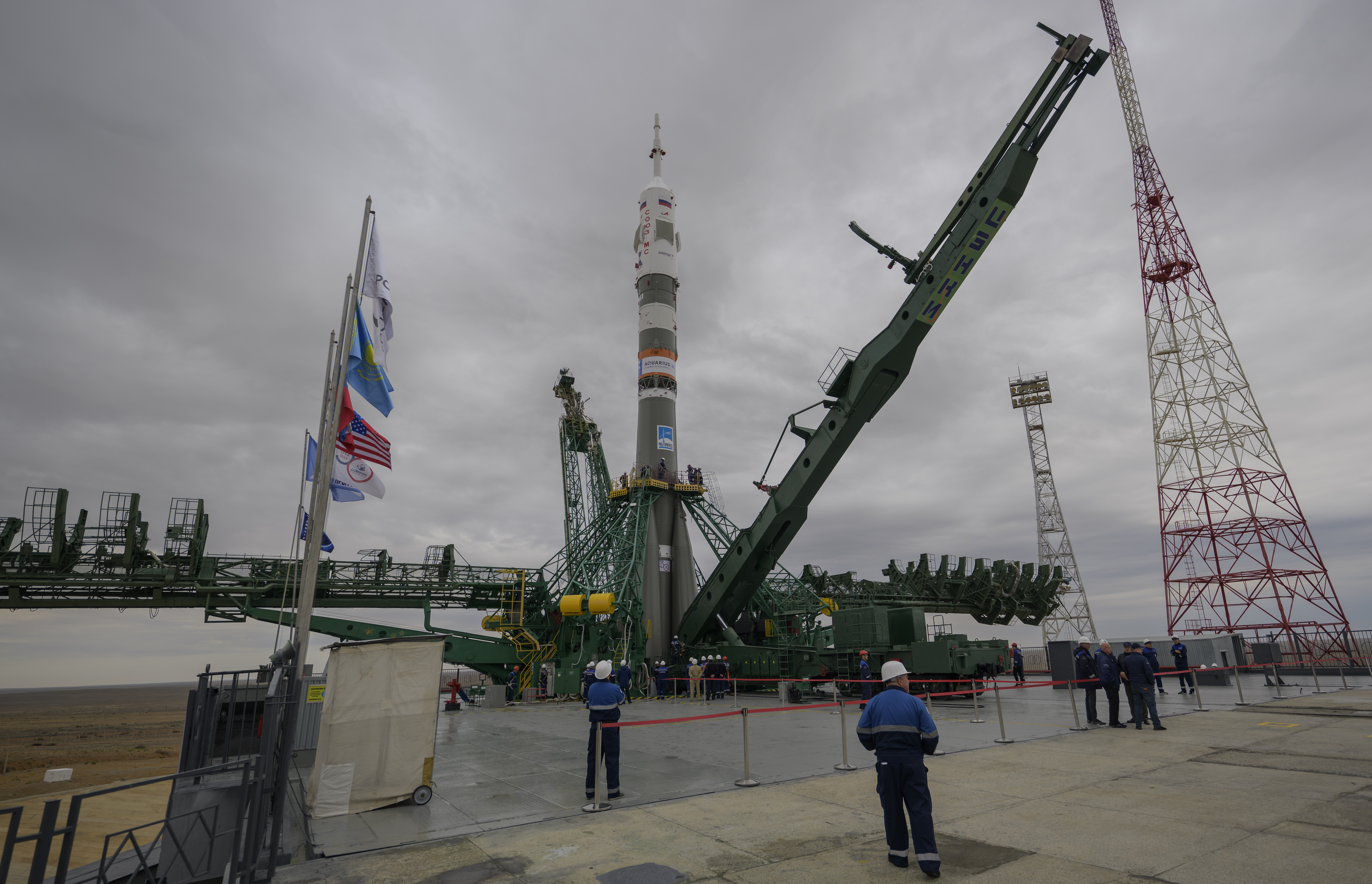
Soyuz‑2.1a prepared for Soyuz MS-26

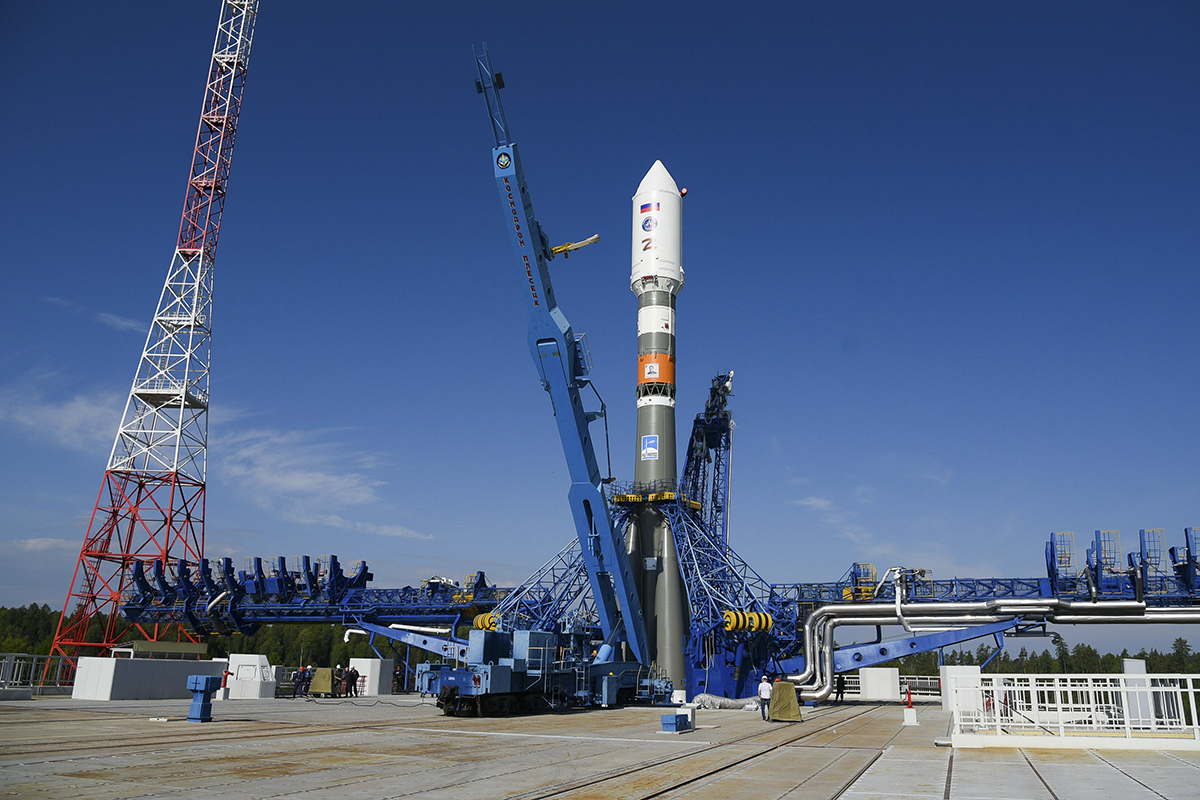
Soyuz‑2.1b prepared for GLONASS-K2 satellite launch

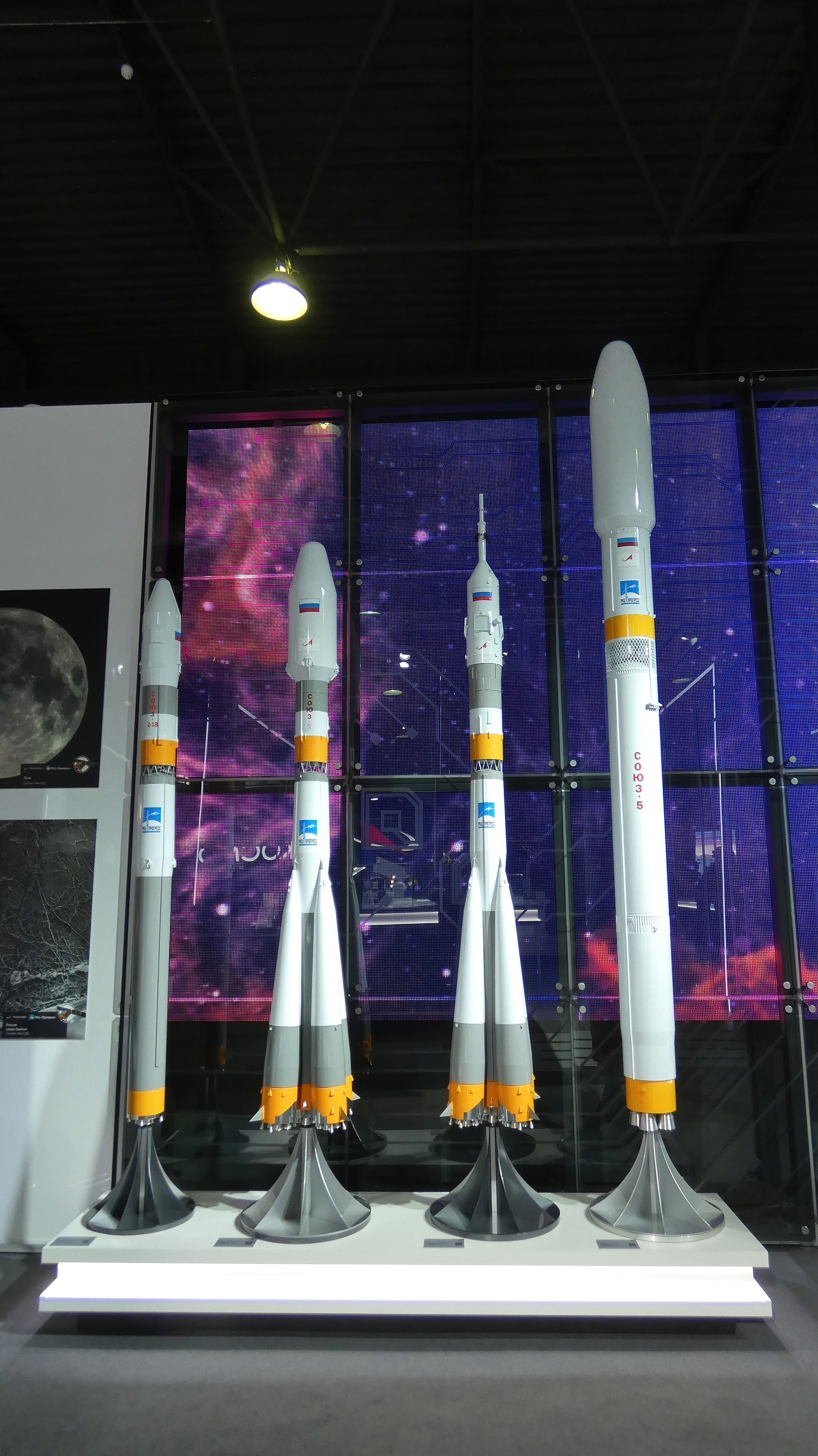
From left to right: Soyuz‑2.1v, Soyuz‑2.1b, Soyuz‑2.1a (crewed variant), and the proposed Soyuz‑5

=== Vostochny modifications ===
The Soyuz-2 family received specific modifications for operation from the Vostochny Cosmodrome, aimed at improving reliability, compatibility with ground infrastructure, and safety:

- The rocket was modified to remain fuelled on the launch pad for up to 100 hours and withstand transport over distances of up to 10,000 kilometres (6,200 mi) from the manufacturing site in Samara to the Russian Far East.
- Structural and piping modifications enable vertical payload integration and safely vent excess propellant outside the Mobile Service Tower, minimizing oxygen vapour buildup inside the gantry.
- Upgraded computer offering six times the performance, reduced weight, and simplified wiring through multiplexing and shared data buses.
- New nickel-cadmium batteries eliminate the need for a dedicated charging station.

On 1 October 2015, it was revealed that parts of the assembly complex at Vostochny had been incorrectly designed for a different rocket variant, with some structures too small to accommodate Soyuz-2. This issue cast doubt on the planned inaugural launch in December 2015. The first launch successfully took place on 28 April 2016.

== Notable missions ==
=== Suborbital test flight ===
On 8 November 2004, at 18:30 UTC, the first Soyuz‑2 rocket, in the Soyuz‑2.1a configuration, was launched from the Plesetsk Cosmodrome in Russia. The rocket followed a suborbital trajectory, with the third stage and Boilerplate landing in the Pacific Ocean.

=== Maiden launch ===
The first attempt at launching a Soyuz‑2 to orbit with the MetOp-A satellite occurred on 17 July 2006. It was scrubbed two hours before the launch by an automatic sequence after the onboard computer failed to check the launch azimuth. Fuelling of the rocket was underway at the time, and all launch complex equipment and onboard preliminary checks had proceeded without incident. The rocket was left fuelled on the launch pad for the next attempt on 18 July 2006. Launch was eventually conducted on 19 October 2006.

=== First crewed mission ===
The first crewed launch of Soyuz‑2 took place on 9 April 2020, carrying Soyuz MS-16 to the ISS.

=== Naphthyl fuel ===
Following successful ground testing, a naphthyl fuelled Soyuz‑2.1b launch took place on 22 October 2022 at Vostochny. Naphthyl is a fuel with fewer aromatic compounds than kerosene, which slightly improves engine performance. There are only minor differences in thermal properties, viscosity, and surface tension, so this did not require significant engine changes.

== Launch statistics ==
Since 2006, Soyuz‑2 rockets have accumulated a total of 172 launches, 167 of which were successful, yielding a 97% success rate.

For Soyuz flights for ESA/Arianespace from French Guiana see Soyuz-ST.

=== Launch outcomes ===
- Failure
- Partial failure
- Success
- Planned

=== Launch sites ===
- Baikonur
- Plesetsk
- Vostochny

== List of launches ==
Launch date Time (UTC)	Configuration	Launch site	Result	Payload	Mission type	Remarks
8 November 2004; 18:30	Soyuz‑2.1a	Plesetsk, Site 43	Success	Zenit-8 (boilerplate)	Suborbital flight test	
19 October 2006; 16:28	Soyuz‑2.1a / Fregat	Baikonur, Site 31	Success	MetOp-A	Weather satellite	
24 December 2006; 08:34	Soyuz‑2.1a / Fregat	Plesetsk, Site 43	Success	Meridian 1	Military communications satellite	
27 December 2006; 14:28	Soyuz‑2.1b / Fregat	Baikonur, Site 31	Success	CoRoT	Astronomy satellite	
26 July 2008; 18:31	Soyuz‑2.1b	Plesetsk, Site 43	Success	Kosmos 2441 (Persona No.1)	Reconnaissance satellite	Launch was successful, but the satellite failed after a few months of operations due to an electrical fault.
21 May 2009; 21:53	Soyuz‑2.1b / Fregat	Plesetsk, Site 43	Failure	Meridian 2	Military communications satellite	Bulging of third-stage combustion chamber led to fuel leak and automatic deactivation; satellite in unusable orbit after failed correction attempt.
17 September 2009; 15:55	Soyuz‑2.1b / Fregat	Baikonur, Site 31	Success	Meteor-M No.1: BLITS; IRIS; Sterkh-2; SumbandilaSat; UGATUSAT; Universitetsky-Tatyana-2	Weather satellite + 6 piggyback satellites	
19 October 2010; 17:11	Soyuz‑2.1a / Fregat‑M	Baikonur, Site 31	Success	Globalstar-2 F1 (6 satellites)	Communications satellite	
2 November 2010; 00:59	Soyuz‑2.1a / Fregat‑M	Plesetsk, Site 43	Success	Meridian 3	Military communications satellite	
26 February 2011; 03:07	Soyuz‑2.1b / Fregat‑M	Plesetsk, Site 43	Success	Kosmos 2471 (GLONASS-K 11L)	Navigation satellite	
4 May 2011; 17:41	Soyuz‑2.1a / Fregat‑M	Plesetsk, Site 43	Success	Meridian 4	Military communications satellite	
13 July 2011; 02:27	Soyuz‑2.1a / Fregat‑M	Baikonur, Site 31	Success	Globalstar-2 F2 (6 satellites)	Communications satellite	
2 October 2011; 20:15	Soyuz‑2.1b / Fregat‑M	Plesetsk, Site 43	Success	Kosmos 2474 (GLONASS-M 742)	Navigation satellite	
28 November 2011; 08:25	Soyuz‑2.1b / Fregat‑M	Plesetsk, Site 43	Success	Kosmos 2478 (GLONASS-M 746)	Navigation satellite	
23 December 2011; 12:08	Soyuz‑2.1b / Fregat‑M	Plesetsk, Site 43	Failure	Meridian 5	Military communications satellite	Third-stage engine shut down early and exploded, sending the rocket off course; satellite not deployed.
28 December 2011; 17:09	Soyuz‑2.1a / Fregat‑M	Baikonur, Site 31	Success	Globalstar-2 F3 (6 satellites)	Communications satellite	
17 September 2012; 16:28	Soyuz‑2.1a / Fregat	Baikonur, Site 31	Success	MetOp-B	Weather satellite	
14 November 2012; 11:42	Soyuz‑2.1a / Fregat‑M	Plesetsk, Site 43	Success	Meridian 6	Military communications satellite	
6 February 2013; 16:04:24	Soyuz‑2.1a / Fregat‑M	Baikonur, Site 31	Success	Globalstar-2 F4 (6 satellites)	Communications satellite	
19 April 2013; 10:00:00	Soyuz‑2.1a	Baikonur, Site 31	Success	Bion-M No.1: Aist 2; Beesat 2/3; Dove-2; OSSI-1; SOMP	Biological science satellite + 5 piggyback satellites	
26 April 2013; 05:23:46	Soyuz‑2.1b / Fregat‑M	Plesetsk, Site 43	Success	Kosmos 2485 (GLONASS-M 747)	Navigation satellite	
7 June 2013; 18:37:59	Soyuz‑2.1b	Plesetsk, Site 43	Success	Kosmos 2486 (Persona No.2)	Reconnaissance satellite	
25 June 2013; 17:28:48	Soyuz‑2.1b	Baikonur, Site 31	Success	Resurs-P No.1	Earth observation satellite	
23 March 2014; 22:54:03	Soyuz‑2.1b / Fregat‑M	Plesetsk, Site 43	Success	Kosmos 2494 (GLONASS-M 754)	Navigation satellite	
6 May 2014; 13:49:35	Soyuz‑2.1a	Plesetsk, Site 43	Success	Kosmos 2495 (Kobalt-M)	Reconnaissance satellite	
14 June 2014; 17:16:48	Soyuz‑2.1b / Fregat‑M	Plesetsk, Site 43	Success	Kosmos 2500 (GLONASS-M 755)	Navigation satellite	
8 July 2014; 15:58:28	Soyuz‑2.1b / Fregat‑M	Baikonur, Site 31	Success	Meteor-M No.2: AISSat-2; DX-1; Relek (MKA-FKI (PN2)); SkySat 2; TechDemoSAT-1; UKube-1	Weather satellite + 6 piggyback satellites	
18 July 2014; 20:50:00	Soyuz‑2.1a	Baikonur, Site 31	Success	Foton-M No.4	Microgravity and biology research satellite	
29 October 2014; 07:09:43	Soyuz‑2.1a	Baikonur, Site 31	Success	Progress M-25M	ISS cargo spacecraft. This was the first time Soyuz 2.1a rocket was used for an ISS mission launch.	
30 October 2014; 01:42:52	Soyuz‑2.1a / Fregat‑M	Plesetsk, Site 43	Success	Meridian 7	Military communications satellite	
30 November 2014; 21:52:26	Soyuz‑2.1b / Fregat‑M	Plesetsk, Site 43	Success	Kosmos 2501 (GLONASS-K 12L)	Navigation satellite	
25 December 2014; 03:01:13	Soyuz‑2.1b	Plesetsk, Site 43	Success	Kosmos 2502 (Lotos-S1 No.1)	ELINT	
26 December 2014; 18:55:50	Soyuz‑2.1b	Baikonur, Site 31	Success	Resurs-P No.2	Earth observation satellite	
27 February 2015; 11:01:35	Soyuz‑2.1a	Plesetsk, Site 43	Success	Kosmos 2503 (Bars-M 1L)	Reconnaissance	
28 April 2015; 07:09:50	Soyuz‑2.1a	Baikonur, Site 31	Failure	Progress M-27M	ISS logistics	The spacecraft lost attitude control and communications after launch vibrations caused damage. ISS docking was canceled, and the mission was declared a total loss.
5 June 2015; 15:23:54	Soyuz‑2.1a	Plesetsk, Site 43	Success	Kosmos 2505 (Kobalt-M)	Reconnaissance	
23 June 2015; 16:44:00	Soyuz‑2.1b	Plesetsk, Site 43	Success	Kosmos 2506 (Persona No.3)	Reconnaissance	
17 November 2015; 06:33:41	Soyuz‑2.1b	Plesetsk, Site 43	Success	Kosmos 2510 (EKS)	Missile early warning	
21 December 2015; 08:44:39	Soyuz‑2.1a	Baikonur, Site 31	Success	Progress MS-01	ISS logistics	
7 February 2016; 00:21:07	Soyuz‑2.1b / Fregat‑M	Plesetsk, Site 43	Success	Kosmos 2514 (GLONASS-M 751)	Navigation	
13 March 2016; 18:56:00	Soyuz‑2.1b	Baikonur, Site 31	Success	Resurs-P No.3	Earth observation	
24 March 2016; 09:42	Soyuz‑2.1a	Plesetsk, Site 43	Success	Kosmos 2515 (Bars-M 2L)	Reconnaissance	
31 March 2016; 16:23:57	Soyuz‑2.1a	Baikonur, Site 31	Success	Progress MS-02	ISS logistics	
28 April 2016; 02:01:21	Soyuz‑2.1a / Volga	Vostochny, Site 1S	Success	Mikhailo Lomonosov: Aist-2D; SamSat 218	Gamma-ray astronomy Technology demonstrations	
29 May 2016; 08:44:37	Soyuz‑2.1b / Fregat‑M	Plesetsk, Site 43	Success	Kosmos 2516 (GLONASS-M 760)	Navigation	The third stage shut down early, but Fregat compensated with a longer burn, placing the satellite in the correct orbit.
25 May 2017; 06:33	Soyuz‑2.1b / Fregat‑M	Plesetsk, Site 43	Success	EKS-2	Missile early warning	
14 June 2017; 09:20	Soyuz‑2.1a	Baikonur, Site 31	Success	Progress MS-06	ISS logistics	
14 July 2017; 06:36:49	Soyuz‑2.1a / Fregat‑M	Baikonur, Site 31	Partial failure	Kanopus-V-IK; Many cubesats	Earth observation Heliophysics	At least 9 of 72 CubeSats failed, due to a Fregat-M upper stage failure.
22 September 2017; 00:02:32	Soyuz‑2.1b / Fregat‑M	Plesetsk, Site 43	Success	Kosmos 2522 (GLONASS-M 752)	Navigation	
14 October 2017; 08:46:53	Soyuz‑2.1a	Baikonur, Site 31	Success	Progress MS-07	ISS logistics	
28 November 2017; 05:41:46	Soyuz‑2.1b / Fregat‑M	Vostochny, Site 1S	Failure	Meteor-M No.2-1; Ionosfera; Baumanets; Several cubesats	Weather; Ionospheric research	Orbital insertion burn fired while the upper stage was oriented in the wrong direction, causing it to re-enter the atmosphere. Roscosmos found 20 years earlier Baikonur coordinates had been mistakenly hardcoded into a Fregat subroutine, and the error only surfaced due to the launch from Vostochny. Critics say the explanation avoids assigning personal blame.
2 December 2017; 10:43:26	Soyuz‑2.1b	Plesetsk, Site 43	Success	Kosmos 2524 (Lotos S1 No.2)	ELINT	
1 February 2018; 02:07:18	Soyuz‑2.1a / Fregat‑M	Vostochny, Site 1S	Success	Kanopus-V No.3, No.4; Lemur-2 74, 75, 76, 77; S-Net 1, 2, 3, 4 D-Star One v.1.1	Earth observation Technology demonstrations	
13 February 2018; 08:13:33	Soyuz‑2.1a	Baikonur, Site 31	Success	Progress MS-08	ISS logistics	
16 June 2018; 21:30	Soyuz‑2.1b / Fregat‑M	Plesetsk, Site 43	Success	Kosmos 2527 (GLONASS-M 756)	Navigation	
9 July 2018; 21:51	Soyuz‑2.1a	Baikonur, Site 31	Success	Progress MS-09	ISS logistics	
25 October 2018; 00:15	Soyuz‑2.1b	Plesetsk, Site 43	Success	Kosmos 2528 (Lotos-S1 No.3)	ELINT	
3 November 2018; 20:17	Soyuz‑2.1b / Fregat‑M	Plesetsk, Site 43	Success	Kosmos 2529 (GLONASS-M 757)	Navigation	
27 December 2018; 02:07	Soyuz‑2.1a / Fregat‑M	Vostochny, Site 1S	Success	Kanopus-V No.5 and Kanopus-V No.6; Dove Flock-w × 12	Earth observation satellites.	
21 February 2019; 19:47	Soyuz‑2.1b / Fregat‑M	Baikonur, Site 31	Success	EgyptSat A	Earth observation	
4 April 2019; 11:01	Soyuz‑2.1a	Baikonur, Site 31	Success	Progress MS-11	ISS logistics	
27 May 2019; 09:23	Soyuz‑2.1b / Fregat‑M	Plesetsk, Site 43	Success	GLONASS-M 758	Navigation.	Lightning struck the rocket 14 seconds after launch without affecting its performance.
5 July 2019; 05:41	Soyuz‑2.1b / Fregat‑M	Vostochny, Site 1S	Success	Meteor-M No.2-2 Microsputnik	Weather	
30 July 2019; 05:56	Soyuz‑2.1a / Fregat‑M	Plesetsk, Site 43	Success	Meridian 8	Communications	
31 July 2019; 12:10	Soyuz‑2.1a	Baikonur, Site 31	Success	Progress MS-12	ISS logistics	
22 August 2019; 03:38	Soyuz‑2.1a	Baikonur, Site 31	Success	Soyuz MS-14 (uncrewed flight test)	ISS crew transport	
26 September 2019; 07:46	Soyuz‑2.1b / Fregat‑M	Plesetsk, Site 43	Success	Kosmos 2541	Military reconnaissance	
6 December 2019; 09:34	Soyuz‑2.1a	Baikonur, Site 31/6	Success	Progress MS-13 / 74P	ISS logistics	
11 December 2019	Soyuz‑2.1b / Fregat‑M	Plesetsk, Site 43/4	Success	GLONASS-M 759	Navigation	
6 February 2020; 21:42:41	Soyuz‑2.1b / Fregat‑M	Baikonur, Site 31/6	Success	OneWeb-2 (34 satellites) (Baikonur flight 1)	Communications	
20 February 2020; 08:24:54	Soyuz‑2.1a / Fregat‑M	Plesetsk, Site 43/3	Success	Meridian M-9 (19L)	Military comsat	
16 March 2020; 18:28:00	Soyuz‑2.1b / Fregat‑M	Plesetsk, Site 43/3	Success	GLONASS-M No.760 (Kosmos 2545)	Navigation	
21 March 2020; 17:06:58	Soyuz‑2.1b / Fregat‑M	Baikonur, Site 31/6	Success	OneWeb-3 (34 satellites) (Baikonur flight 2)	Communications	
9 April 2020; 08:05:06	Soyuz‑2.1a	Baikonur, Site 31/6	Success	Soyuz MS-16	ISS crew transport	
25 April 2020; 01:51:41	Soyuz‑2.1a	Baikonur, Site 31/6	Success	Progress MS-14	ISS logistics	
22 May 2020; 06:45	Soyuz‑2.1b / Fregat‑M	Plesetsk, Site 43	Success	EKS-4 (Tundra 14L)	Early warning	
23 July 2020; 14:26:22	Soyuz‑2.1a	Baikonur, Site 31/6	Success	Progress MS-15	ISS logistics	
28 September 2020; 11:20:00	Soyuz‑2.1b / Fregat‑M	Plesetsk, Site 43/4	Success	Gonets-M (17/18/19); GEN-1 (Antilles and Amidala) (Canada), Lemur-2 (4) (United States), MeznSat (United Arab Emirates), SALSAT (Germany), NetSat-1 to 4 (Germany), ICEYE-X6 and X7 (Finland), LacunaSat-3 (Lithuania), Yarilo-1 and 2 (Russia), Norbi (Russia) and Dekart (Descartes) (Russia)	Communications	
14 October 2020; 05:45:04	Soyuz‑2.1a	Baikonur, Site 31/6	Success	Soyuz MS-17	ISS crew transport	
25 October 2020; 19:08:42	Soyuz‑2.1b / Fregat‑M	Plesetsk, Site 43/4	Success	Kosmos 2547 (GLONASS-K 15L)	Navigation	
3 December 2020; 01:14	Soyuz‑2.1b / Fregat	Plesetsk, Site 43/3	Success	Gonets-M 20/21/22; ERA-1 (Kosmos-2548) (nanosatellite)	Communication; Technology – Russian Ministry of Defense	
18 December 2020; 12:26:26	Soyuz‑2.1b / Fregat	Vostochny, Site 1S	Success	OneWeb-4 (36 satellites) (Vostochny flight 1)	Communications	
2 February 2021; 20:45:28	Soyuz‑2.1b	Plesetsk, Site 43/4	Success	Kosmos 2549 (Lotos-S1 No.4)	ELINT	
15 February 2021; 04:45:05	Soyuz‑2.1a	Baikonur, Site 31/6	Success	Progress MS-16	ISS logistics	
28 February 2021; 06:55:01	Soyuz‑2.1b / Fregat‑M	Baikonur, Site 31/6	Success	Arktika-M No.1	Weather satellite	
22 March 2021; 06:07:12	Soyuz‑2.1a / Fregat‑M	Baikonur, Site 31/6	Success	CAS500-1; A cluster of secondary commercial payloads (+37 satellites).	Earth observation	
25 March 2021; 02:47:33	Soyuz‑2.1b / Fregat	Vostochny, Site 1S	Success	OneWeb-5 (36 satellites) (Vostochny flight 2)	Communications	
9 April 2021; 07:42:40	Soyuz‑2.1a	Baikonur, Site 31/6	Success	Soyuz MS-18	ISS crew transport	
25 April 2021; 22:14:08	Soyuz‑2.1b / Fregat	Vostochny, Site 1S	Success	OneWeb-6 (36 satellites) (Vostochny flight 3)	Communications	
28 May 2021; 17:38:39	Soyuz‑2.1b / Fregat	Vostochny, Site 1S	Success	OneWeb-7 (36 satellites) (Vostochny flight 4)	Communications	
25 June 2021; 19:50:00	Soyuz‑2.1b	Plesetsk, Site 43/4	Success	Kosmos 2550 (Pion-NKS No.1)	SIGINT	
29 June 2021; 23:27:20	Soyuz‑2.1a	Baikonur, Site 31/6	Success	Progress MS-17	ISS logistics	
1 July 2021; 12:48:33	Soyuz‑2.1b / Fregat	Vostochny, Site 1S	Success	OneWeb-8 (36 satellites) (Vostochny flight 5)	Communications	
21 August 2021; 22:13:40	Soyuz‑2.1b / Fregat	Baikonur, Site 31/6	Success	OneWeb-9 (34 satellites) (Baikonur flight 3)	Communications	
14 September 2021; 18:07:19	Soyuz‑2.1b / Fregat	Baikonur, Site 31/6	Success	OneWeb-10 (34 satellites) (Baikonur flight 4)	Communications	
5 October 2021; 08:55:02	Soyuz‑2.1a	Baikonur, Site 31/6	Success	Soyuz MS-19	ISS crew transport	
14 October 2021; 09:40:10	Soyuz‑2.1b / Fregat	Vostochny, Site 1S	Success	OneWeb (36 satellites) (Vostochny flight 6)	Communications	
28 October 2021; 00:00:32	Soyuz‑2.1a	Baikonur, Site 31/6	Success	Progress MS-18	ISS logistics	
24 November 2021; 13:06:35	Soyuz‑2.1b	Baikonur, Site 31/6	Success	Prichal	ISS assembly	
25 November 2021; 01:09:13	Soyuz‑2.1b / Fregat	Plesetsk, Site 43/4	Success	Kosmos 2552 (EKS-5, Tundra 15L)	Early warning	
8 December 2021; 07:38:15	Soyuz‑2.1a	Baikonur, Site 31/6	Success	Soyuz MS-20	ISS crew transport and space tourism	
27 December 2021; 13:10:37	Soyuz‑2.1b / Fregat	Baikonur, Site 31/6	Success	OneWeb (36 satellites) (Baikonur flight 5)	Communications	
5 February 2022; 07:00:00	Soyuz‑2.1a / Fregat	Plesetsk, Site 43/4	Success	Kosmos 2553	Military	
15 February 2022; 04:25:39	Soyuz‑2.1a	Baikonur, Site 31/6	Success	Progress MS-19	ISS logistics	
18 March 2022; 15:55:18	Soyuz‑2.1a	Baikonur, Site 31/6	Success	Soyuz MS-21	ISS crew transport	
22 March 2022; 12:48:22	Soyuz‑2.1a / Fregat	Plesetsk, Site 43/4	Success	Meridian-M 10 (20L)	Military communications	
7 April 2022; 11:20:18	Soyuz‑2.1b	Plesetsk, Site 43/3	Success	Kosmos 2554 (Lotos-S1 No.5)	ELINT	
19 May 2022; 08:03:32	Soyuz‑2.1a	Plesetsk, Site 43/4	Success	Kosmos 2556 (Bars-M 3L)	Reconnaissance	
3 June 2022; 09:32:16	Soyuz‑2.1a	Baikonur, Site 31/6	Success	Progress MS-20	ISS logistics	
7 July 2022; 09:18:06	Soyuz‑2.1b / Fregat‑M	Plesetsk, Site 43/4	Success	Kosmos 2557 (GLONASS-K 16L)	Navigation	
9 August 2022; 05:52:38	Soyuz‑2.1b / Fregat‑M	Baikonur, Site 31/6	Success	Khayyam; 16 rideshare cubesats	Earth observation	
21 September 2022; 13:54:49	Soyuz‑2.1a	Baikonur, Site 31/6	Success	Soyuz MS-22	ISS crew transport	
10 October 2022; 02:52:32	Soyuz‑2.1b / Fregat‑M	Plesetsk, Site 43/3	Success	Kosmos 2559 (GLONASS-K 17L)	Navigation	
22 October 2022; 19:57:09	Soyuz‑2.1b / Fregat‑M	Vostochny, Site 1S	Success	Gonets-M 23/24/25 (33L/34L/35L), Skif-D	Communications	
26 October 2022; 00:20:09	Soyuz‑2.1a	Baikonur Site 31/6	Success	Progress MS-21	ISS logistics	
2 November 2022; 06:47:48	Soyuz‑2.1b / Fregat‑M	Plesetsk, Site 43/4	Success	Kosmos 2563 (EKS-6, Tundra 16L)	Early warning	
28 November 2022; 15:13:50	Soyuz‑2.1b / Fregat‑M	Plesetsk, Site 43/3	Success	Kosmos 2564 (GLONASS-M 761)	Navigation	
30 November 2022; 21:10:25	Soyuz‑2.1b	Plesetsk, Site 43/4	Success	Kosmos 2565 (Lotos-S1 No.6); Kosmos 2566	ELINT	
9 February 2023; 06:15:36	Soyuz‑2.1a	Baikonur, Site 31/6	Success	Progress MS-22	ISS logistics	
24 February 2023; 00:24:29	Soyuz‑2.1a	Baikonur, Site 31/6	Success	Soyuz MS-23	ISS crew transport	
23 March 2023; 06:40:11	Soyuz‑2.1a	Plesetsk, Site 43/3	Success	Kosmos 2567 (Bars-M 4L)	Reconnaissance	
24 May 2023 12:56:07	Soyuz‑2.1a	Baikonur, Site 31/6	Success	Progress MS-23	ISS logistics	
26 May 2023 21:14:51	Soyuz‑2.1a / Fregat‑M	Vostochny, Site 1S	Success	Kondor-FKA No.1	Reconnaissance	
27 June 2023 11:34:49	Soyuz‑2.1b / Fregat‑M	Vostochny, Site 1S	Success	Meteor-M No.2-3; 42 rideshare satellites	Weather; Various uses	
7 August 2023 13:19:25	Soyuz‑2.1b / Fregat‑M	Plesetsk, Site 43/3	Success	Kosmos 2569 (GLONASS-K2 13L)	Navigation	
10 August 2023 23:10:57	Soyuz‑2.1b / Fregat‑M	Vostochny, Site 1S	Success	Luna 25 (Luna-Glob lander)	Lunar exploration	
23 August 2023 01:08:10	Soyuz‑2.1a	Baikonur, Site 31/6	Success	Progress MS-24	ISS logistics	
15 September 2023 15:44:35	Soyuz‑2.1a	Baikonur, Site 31/6	Success	Soyuz MS-24	ISS crew transport	
27 October 2023 06:04:43	Soyuz‑2.1b	Plesetsk, Site 43/3	Success	Kosmos 2570 (Lotos-S1 No.7); Kosmos 2571	ELINT	
25 November 2023 20:58:06	Soyuz‑2.1b	Plesetsk, Site 43/4	Success	Kosmos 2572 (Razdan 1)	Reconnaissance	
1 December 2023 09:25:11	Soyuz‑2.1a	Baikonur, Site 31/6	Success	Progress MS-25	ISS logistics	
16 December 2023 09:17:48	Soyuz‑2.1b / Fregat‑M	Baikonur, Site 31/6	Success	Arktika-M No.2	Meteorology	
21 December 2023 08:48:39	Soyuz‑2.1b	Plesetsk, Site 43/4	Success	Kosmos 2573 (Bars-M 5L)	Reconnaissance	
15 February 2024 03:25:05	Soyuz‑2.1a	Baikonur, Site 31/6	Success	Progress MS-26	ISS logistics	
29 February 2024 05:43:26	Soyuz‑2.1b / Fregat‑M	Vostochny, Site 1S	Success	Meteor-M No.2-4; 18 rideshare satellites	Weather; Various uses	
23 March 2024 12:36:10	Soyuz‑2.1a	Baikonur, Site 31/6	Success	Soyuz MS-25	ISS crew transport	
31 March 2024 09:36:45	Soyuz‑2.1b	Baikonur, Site 31/6	Success	Resurs-P No.4	Earth observation	
16 May 2024 21:21:29	Soyuz‑2.1b / Fregat‑M	Plesetsk, Site 43/4	Success	Kosmos 2576 (Nivelir-L No.4); 9 rideshare satellites	Reconnaissance; Various uses	
30 May 2024 09:42:59	Soyuz‑2.1a	Baikonur, Site 31/6	Success	Progress MS-27	ISS logistics	
15 August 2024 03:20:18	Soyuz‑2.1a	Baikonur, Site 31/6	Success	Progress MS-28	ISS logistics	
11 September 2024 16:23:12	Soyuz‑2.1a	Baikonur, Site 31/6	Success	Soyuz MS-26	ISS crew transport	
31 October 2024 07:51:31	Soyuz‑2.1a	Plesetsk, Site 43/4	Success	Kosmos 2579 (Bars-M 6L)	Reconnaissance	
4 November 2024 23:18:40	Soyuz‑2.1b / Fregat‑M	Vostochny, Site 1S	Success	Ionosfera-M No.1; Ionosfera-M No.2; 53 rideshare satellites	Ionospheric research Various uses	
21 November 2024 12:22:23	Soyuz‑2.1a	Baikonur, Site 31/6	Success	Progress MS-29	ISS logistics	
29 November 2024 21:50:25	Soyuz‑2.1a / Fregat‑M	Vostochny, Site 1S	Success	Kondor-FKA No.2	Reconnaissance	
4 December 2024 18:03:13	Soyuz‑2.1b	Plesetsk, Site 43/4	Success	Kosmos 2580 (Lotos-S1 No.8)	ELINT	
25 December 2024 07:45:42	Soyuz‑2.1b	Baikonur, Site 31/6	Success	Resurs-P No.5	Earth observation	2,000th R-7 family rocket launched.
27 February 2025 21:24:27	Soyuz‑2.1a	Baikonur, Site 31/6	Success	Progress MS-30	ISS logistics	
2 March 2025 22:22:16	Soyuz‑2.1b / Fregat‑M	Plesetsk, Site 43/3	Success	Kosmos 2584 (GLONASS-K2 No. 14L (K2 No.2))	Navigation	
8 April 2025 05:47:15	Soyuz‑2.1a	Baikonur, Site 31/6	Success	Soyuz MS-27	ISS crew transport	
23 May 2025 08:36	Soyuz‑2.1b / Fregat‑M	Plesetsk, Site 43/4	Success	Kosmos 2588 (Nivelir-L No.5)	Reconnaissance	
3 July 2025 19:32:40	Soyuz‑2.1a	Baikonur, Site 31/6	Success	Progress MS-31	ISS logistics	
25 July 2025 05:54:04	Soyuz‑2.1b / Fregat‑M	Vostochny, Site 1S	Success	Ionosfera-M No.3; Ionosfera-M No.4; 18 rideshare satellites	Ionospheric research Various uses	
20 August 2025 17:13:10	Soyuz‑2.1b	Baikonur, Site 31/6	Success	Bion-M No.2	Biological science	
11 September 2025 15:54:06	Soyuz‑2.1a	Baikonur, Site 31/6	Success	Progress MS-32	ISS logistics	
13 September 2025 02:10:00	Soyuz‑2.1b / Fregat‑M	Plesetsk, Site 43/3	Success	Kosmos 2595 (GLONASS-K No. 18L); Kosmos 2596 (Mozhayets-6)	Navigation & Small experimental satellite	
27 November 2025 09:27:57	Soyuz‑2.1a	Baikonur, Site 31/6	Success	Soyuz MS-28	ISS crew transport	pad structure damaged during launch
25 December 2025 14:11	Soyuz‑2.1a	Plesetsk, Site 43/4	Success	Obzor-R No.1	Earth observation	
28 December 2025 13:18:05	Soyuz‑2.1b / Fregat‑M	Vostochny, Site 1S	Success	Aist-2T No.1; Aist-2T No.2; 50 rideshares	Earth observation Various uses	
5 February 2026 18:59	Soyuz‑2.1b / Fregat‑M	Plesetsk, Site 43/4	Success	Kosmos 2600 to Kosmos 2608	9 Military payloads	
22 March 2026 11:59:51	Soyuz‑2.1a	Baikonur, Site 31/6	Success	Progress MS-33	ISS logistics	
23 March 2026 17:24	Soyuz‑2.1b	Plesetsk, Site 43/4	Success	16 × Rassvet-3	Internet constellation	First batch of Rassvet-3 satellites for the Byuro-1440 internet constellation.
3 April 2026 06:28	Soyuz‑2.1a / Fregat	Plesetsk, Site 43/3	Success	Meridian-M 11 (21L)	Military communications	
16 April 2026 23:18	Soyuz‑2.1b / Volga	Plesetsk, Site 43/4	Success	Kosmos 2609 to Kosmos 2614	6 Military payloads	This is the second time the Soyuz has used the Volga upper stage, the first time was in 2016 with the launch of Vostochny.
25 April 2026 22:21:47	Soyuz‑2.1a	Baikonur, Site 31/6	Success	Progress MS-34	ISS logistics	
14 July 2026 14:47:43	Soyuz‑2.1a	Baikonur, Site 31/6	Success	Soyuz MS-29	ISS crew transport	
19 July 2026 17:51	Soyuz‑2.1b	Plesetsk, Site 43/4	Success	16 × Rassvet-3	Internet constellation	Second batch of Rassvet-3 satellites for the Byuro-1440 internet constellation.
24 August 2026 02:40:00	Soyuz‑2.1b / Fregat‑M	Plesetsk, Site 43/3	Success	(GLONASS-K No. 19L)	Navigation	
16 September 2026 13:33:54	Soyuz‑2.1b	Baikonur, Site 31/6	Success	Progress MS-35	ISS logistics	This is the First time Progress is using version 2.1b.
17 September 2026 16:50	Soyuz‑2.1b / Fregat‑M	Plesetsk, Site 43/3	Success	(GLONASS-K No. 20L)	Navigation	
7 November 2026 13:30	Soyuz‑2.1b / Fregat‑M	Plesetsk, Site 43/3	Success	(GLONASS-K No. 21L)	Navigation	
14 November 2026 01:16	Soyuz‑2.1b / Fregat‑M	Vostochny, Site 1S	Success	MKA Kinosputnik, KOEN and others	Earth observation & others	

=== Planned launches ===
Launch date Time (UTC)	Configuration	Launch site	Payload	Mission type	Remarks
24 November 2026	Soyuz‑2.1b	Baikonur, Site 31/6	Progress MS-36	ISS logistics	
2026	Soyuz‑2.1a / Fregat	Vostochny, Site 1S	Meteor-M No.2-5	Weather	
2026	Soyuz‑2.1b	Vostochny, Site 1S	Resurs-PM No.1	Earth observation	
2026	Soyuz‑2.1a / Fregat	Vostochny, Site 1S	Kondor-FKA-M No.1	Reconnaissance	
2026	Soyuz‑2.1a / Fregat	Vostochny, Site 1S	Meteor-M No.2-6	Weather	
2026	Soyuz‑2.1b	Vostochny, Site 1S	Resurs-PM No.2	Earth observation	
2026	Soyuz‑2.1a	Baikonur, Site 31	Soyuz MS-30	ISS crew transport	
October 2026	Soyuz‑2.1a	Baikonur, Site 31/6	Progress MS-37	ISS logistics	
2027	Soyuz‑2.1b / Fregat	Vostochny, Site 1S	Luna 26	Lunar orbiter	
2028	Soyuz‑2.1b / Fregat	Baikonur, Site 31/6	Universal Node Module (UUM)	Space station module	
2030	Soyuz‑2.1b / Fregat	Baikonur, Site 31/6	Gateway/Airlock Module (ShM)	Space station module	

== See also ==
- Soyuz programme
- List of R-7 launches
- Medium-lift launch vehicle
