= Meridian (satellite) =

Family of communication satellites

Meridian (Russian: Меридиан) is a family of telecommunications satellites for civil and military use developed by Russia in the 2000s, placed in a Molniya orbit, and intended to replace the two last series of Molniya satellites still in activity, as well as the old Parus satellites. The first launch took place on 24 December 2006, aboard a Soyuz 2.1a. Seven satellites were launched between 2006 and 2014, six of which reached orbit. A second generation of satellite, Meridian-M, was ordered, and the first unit was launched on 30 July 2019.

== Technical characteristics ==
This family of satellites was developed in the mid-2000s by the main Russian satellite manufacturer, ISS Reshetnev, who had already built the Molniya satellites. According to unofficial sources, the satellite uses 3 axes stabilized pressurized platform. Certain components, like the on-board computer and the propulsion, would be common with the Uragan-M satellites of the Glonass satellite navigation system. The manufacturer indicated that the satellites of the series have a mass of approximately 2000 kg, have orientable solar arrays, and carry three transponders designed to work with the Raduga satellites. The lifespan announced by the manufacturer was 7 years.

== Orbit and use ==
Like its predecessors, the Meridian satellites are placed in a very elliptical Molniya orbit of 900 × 39000 km x 63°, which allows them to remain during a large part of their orbit visible from Arctic areas poorly served by geostationary telecommunications orbits. The launcher used is a Soyuz 2.1a with a Fregat upper stage, which is launched from the Plesetsk cosmodrome. The satellite is for mixed civil and military use. Given their orbit, they are mainly intended to provide links with ships and planes operating in the Arctic Ocean, as well as with stations based in the Far East and Siberia.

== List of satellites launched ==
The first satellite in the series quickly fell victim to space debris, according to the Russian authorities.

The numbering of the satellites is quite specific. The manufacturer ISS Rechetnev begins numbering its satellites at 11, the first numbers being reserved for test specimens. The letter L is attached to the number to indicate that it is a flying copy (лётный in Russian). Thus, the first satellite is called Meridian n°11L. Other sources, such as the NASA Space Science Data Coordinated Archive, list them as simply Meridian 1, Meridian 2, etc.

Last update: 22 December 2023

Satellite	Launcher/ Upper Stage	Launch time (UTC)	Launch base	Success	COSPAR ID	Notes
Meridian n°11L (1)	Soyuz 2.1a Fregat	24 December 2006 08:34	Site 43/4 Plesetsk	✓	2006-061A	Hit by space debris First Meridian satellite in orbit.
Meridian n°12L (2)	Soyuz 2.1a Fregat	21 May 2009 21:53	Site 43/4 Plesetsk	~	2009-029A	Partial Success : Perigee lower than planned.
Meridian n°13L (3)	Soyuz 2.1a Fregat-M	2 November 2010 03:01	Site 43/4 Plesetsk	✓	2010-058A
Meridian n°14L (4)	Soyuz 2.1a Fregat-M	4 May 2011 17:41	Site 43/4 Plesetsk	✓	2011-018A
Meridian n°15L (5)	Soyuz 2.1a Fregat-M	23 December 2011 12:08	Site 43/4 Plesetsk	✕	–	Failure : Launch failed, debris from the launch fell over the Ordynsky District, Novosibirsk Oblast.
Meridian n°16L (6)	Soyuz 2.1a Fregat-M	14 November 2012 11:43	Site 43/4 Plesetsk	✓	2012-063A
Meridian n°17L (7)	Soyuz 2.1a Fregat-M	30 October 2014 01:43	Site 43/4 Plesetsk	✓	2014-069A	Last flight of a first generation satellite.
Meridian-M n°18L (8)	Soyuz 2.1a Fregat-M	30 July 2019 05:56	Site 43/4 Plesetsk	✓	2019-046A	First flight of the modernized Meridian-M version.
Meridian-M n°19L (9)	Soyuz 2.1a Fregat-M	20 February 2020 08:24	Site 43/3 Plesetsk	✓	2020-015A	First flight from Site 43/3.
Meridian-M n°20L (10)	Soyuz 2.1a Fregat-M	22 March 2022 12:48	Site 43/4 Plesetsk	✓	2022-030A
Meridian-M n°21L (11)	Soyuz 2.1a Fregat-M	2024	Site 43 Plesetsk	✓	–
Meridian-M n°22L	Soyuz 2.1a Fregat-M	2025	Site 43 Plesetsk	-	–
Meridian-M n°23L	Soyuz 2.1a Fregat-M	2025	Site 43 Plesetsk	-	–	Last Meridian-M ordered.
