= Meridian 1 =

- Mission type: Communications
- Operator: VKS
- COSPAR ID: 2006-061A
- SATCAT no.: 29668
- Mission duration: less than 2 years and 5 months

Spacecraft properties
- Manufacturer: ISS Reshetnev

Start of mission
- Launch date: 24 December 2006, 08:34:44 UTC
- Rocket: Soyuz-2.1a/Fregat
- Launch site: Plesetsk 43/4
- Entered service: 1 February 2007

End of mission
- Disposal: Re-entered
- Last contact: before May 2009
- Decay date: 6 July 2021, 12:20 UTC

Orbital parameters
- Reference system: Geocentric
- Regime: Molniya
- Perigee altitude: 2,473 kilometres (1,537 mi)
- Apogee altitude: 37,882 kilometres (23,539 mi)
- Inclination: 65 degrees
- Period: 717 minutes
- Epoch: 6 July 2014

Meridian 1 (Russian: Меридиан-1), also known as Meridian No.11L, was a Russian communications satellite. It was the first satellite to be launched as part of the Meridian system to replace the older Molniya series.

Meridian 1 was the first Russian Government satellite to be launched by a Soyuz-2 rocket. The Soyuz-2.1a configuration was used, along with a Fregat upper stage. The launch occurred from Site 43/4 at the Plesetsk Cosmodrome at 08:34:44 GMT on 24 December 2006.

It was constructed by ISS Reshetnev (at the time known as NPO-PM) and was believed to be based on the Uragan-M satellite bus, which has also been used for GLONASS navigation satellites. It operated in a Molniya orbit with a perigee of 900 kilometres (560 mi), an apogee of 39,000 kilometres (24,000 mi), and 65° inclination.

The satellite entered service on 1 February 2007. By May 2009 it had failed, before the end of its projected lifespan. NPO-PM reported that an impact with a piece of debris had caused the spacecraft to malfunction.

Meridian 1 re-entered on 6 July 2021, around 12:20 UTC.
