= Orbital inclination change =

Spaceflight maneuver

Orbital inclination change is an orbital maneuver aimed at changing the inclination of an orbiting body's orbit. This maneuver is also known as an orbital plane change as the plane of the orbit is tipped. This maneuver requires a change in the orbital velocity vector (delta-v) at the orbital nodes (i.e. the point where the initial and desired orbits intersect, the line of orbital nodes is defined by the intersection of the two orbital planes).

In general, inclination changes can take a very large amount of delta-v to perform, and most mission planners try to avoid them whenever possible to conserve fuel. This is typically achieved by launching a spacecraft directly into the desired inclination, or as close to it as possible so as to minimize any inclination change required over the duration of the spacecraft life. Planetary flybys are the most efficient way to achieve large inclination changes, but they are only effective for interplanetary missions.

== Efficiency ==
The simplest way to perform a plane change is to perform a burn around one of the two crossing points of the initial and final planes. The delta-v required is the vector change in velocity between the two planes at that point.

However, maximum efficiency of inclination changes are achieved at apoapsis, (or apogee), where orbital velocity $v$ is the lowest. In some cases, it can require less total delta-v to raise the satellite into a higher orbit, change the orbit plane at the higher apogee, and then lower the satellite to its original altitude.

For the most efficient example mentioned above, targeting an inclination at apoapsis also changes the argument of periapsis. However, targeting in this manner limits the mission designer to changing the plane only along the line of apsides.

For Hohmann transfer orbits, the initial orbit and the final orbit are 180 degrees apart. Because the transfer orbital plane has to include the central body, such as the Sun, and the initial and final nodes, this can require two 90 degree plane changes to reach and leave the transfer plane. In such cases it is often more efficient to use a broken plane maneuver where an additional burn is done so that plane change only occurs at the intersection of the initial and final orbital planes, rather than at the ends.

== Inclination entangled with other orbital elements ==
An important subtlety of performing an inclination change is that Keplerian orbital inclination is defined by the angle between ecliptic North and the vector normal to the orbit plane, (i.e. the angular momentum vector). This means that inclination is always positive and is entangled with other orbital elements primarily the argument of periapsis which is in turn connected to the longitude of the ascending node. This can result in two very different orbits with precisely the same inclination.

== Calculation ==
In a pure inclination change, only the inclination of the orbit is changed while all other orbital characteristics (radius, shape, etc.) remains the same as before. Delta-v ($\Delta v_i$) required for an inclination change ($\Delta i$) can be calculated as follows:
$$\Delta v_i = {2\sin(\frac{\Delta{i}}{2})(1+e\cos(f))na \over {\sqrt{1-e^2}\cos(\omega+f)}}$$
where:

- $e\,$ is the orbital eccentricity
- $\omega\,$ is the argument of periapsis
- $f\,$ is the true anomaly
- $n\,$ is the mean motion
- $a\,$ is the semi-major axis

For more complicated maneuvers which may involve a combination of change in inclination and orbital radius, the delta-v is the vector difference between the velocity vectors of the initial orbit and the desired orbit at the transfer point. These types of combined maneuvers are commonplace, as it is more efficient to perform multiple orbital maneuvers at the same time if these maneuvers have to be done at the same location.

According to the law of cosines, the minimum Delta-v ($\Delta{v}\,$) required for any such combined maneuver can be calculated with the following equation
$$\Delta v = \sqrt{V_1^2 + V_2^2 - 2 V_1 V_2 cos(\Delta i)}$$

Here $V_1$ and $V_2$ are the initial and target velocities.

== Circular orbit inclination change ==
Where both orbits are circular (i.e. $e = 0$) and have the same radius the Delta-v ($\Delta v_i$) required for an inclination change ($\Delta i$) can be calculated using:
$$\Delta v_i = {2v\, \sin \left(\frac{\Delta{i}}{2} \right)}$$
where $v$ is the orbital velocity and has the same units as $\Delta v_i$.

== Other ways to change inclination ==
Some other ways to change inclination that do not require burning propellant (or help reduce the amount of propellant required) include

- aerodynamic lift (for bodies within an atmosphere, such as the Earth)
- solar sails

Transits of other bodies such as the Moon can also be done.

None of these methods will change the delta-V required, they are simply alternate means of achieving the same end result and, ideally, will reduce propellant usage.

== See also ==
- Orbital inclination
- Orbital maneuver
