= Persona (satellite) =

Class of Russian reconnaissance satellites

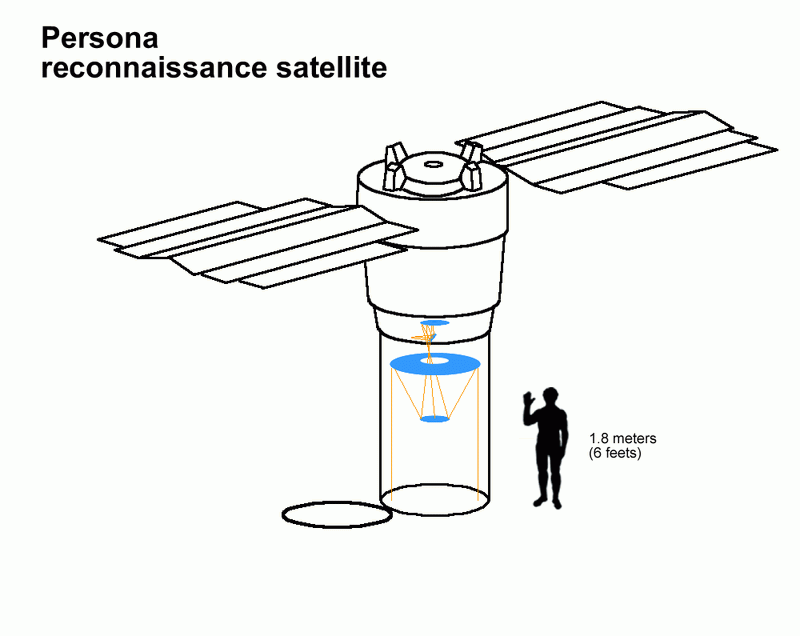
- Artist's impression of a Persona satellite
- Manufacturer: TsSKB Progress; LOMO; Vavilov State Optical Institute; NPO Opteks
- Country of origin: Russia
- Operator: VKS (2008-2011); VKO (2011-)
- Applications: Optical imaging

Specifications
- Launch mass: 7,000 kilograms (15,000 lb)
- Regime: Sun-synchronous
- Design life: 3-5 years

Production
- Status: In production
- Built: 3
- Launched: 3
- Operational: 2
- Failed: 1
- Maiden launch: Kosmos 2441; 26 July 2008

Related spacecraft
- Derived from: Yantar

Persona is a class of Russian reconnaissance satellites, derived from the Resurs DK class of remote sensing satellite, in turn derived from the Soviet Yantar reconnaissance satellites. The satellites are built by TsSKB-Progress, and the optics by LOMO and the Vavilov State Optical Institute.

== Satellite ==
The first satellite, identified as Kosmos 2441, was launched into a 750 km Sun-synchronous orbit on 26 July 2008, atop a Soyuz-2.1b carrier rocket from LC-43/4 at the Plesetsk Cosmodrome. It reportedly failed to return useful imagery due to an electrical malfunction.

A second satellite, Kosmos 2486, was launched on 7 June 2013 and after some initial technical problems, it was apparently operational in Summer 2014.

The third satellite, Kosmos 2506, was successfully launched on 23 June 2015.

== Details ==
The satellites had a mass of 6,500 kilograms (14,300 lb), are 7 metres (23 ft) long, and 2.7 metres (8.9 ft) in diameter.

The satellites' optical subsystems are believed to be based on a 3-mirror Korsch type telescope with a primary mirror diameter of 1.5 metres (4.9 ft) and focal length of 20 metres (66 ft).

The Korsch optics of the Persona satellite.

The CCD sensor is probably ELCT1080v1U with a pixel size of 9 μm. The CCD is produced by ELAR, previously known as ELECTRON-OPTRONIC.

The focal plane unit is manufactured by NPO Opteks.

The satellites had a nadir image spatial resolution of 33 centimetres (13 in), using panchromatic imagery. They are planned to operate for seven years.

== Satellites ==
Satellite Name	Russian name	Launch Date	Flight Number	SCN	Status
Cosmos-2441	Персона No. 1	26 July 2008	2008-037A	33272	Decommissioned, unable to transmit images seven months after launch
Cosmos-2486	Персона No. 2	7 June 2013	2013-028A	39177	
Cosmos-2506	Персона No. 3	23 June 2015	2015-029A	40699	

=== Persona Number 1 ===
The launch of the first Persona satellite was planned to be launched in 2004, however technical issues in 2002 pushed the launch date to 2006. Project delays and cost overruns led Russia's two other leading spacecraft developers, NPO Lavochkin and RKK Energia, to propose the launch of a third Araks satellite as a stop-gap measure. The Russian government held to their original plan to launch the Persona satellite delaying the launch until 2007, then January 2008. At the time of the launch, the price tag had reached 5 billion rubles. Despite shipment to the launch site to meet an announced government milestone, the craft was still far from readiness and launch was delayed until the end of the July 2008. Reportedly a botched test in the Spring damaged components.

After an additional delay for technical problems the satellite was launched on 26 July 2008. In February 2009, Rossiskaya Gazeta reported that the first Persona satellite had failed due to issues with onboard electronics. Other theories for the failures include an improperly chosen orbit that place the spacecraft too close to Earth's radiation belt or that imported, low-cost electronics led to a critical failure in aviation components. Consequently, the satellite became unable to transmit images.
