= Resurs-DK No.1 =

Russian Earth observation satellite

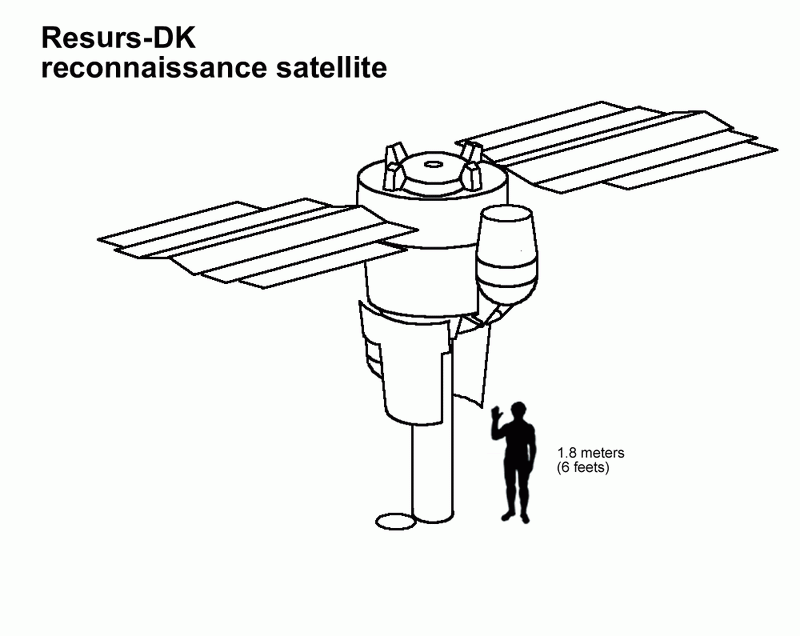
- Names: Resurs-DK1
- Mission type: Earth observation
- Operator: NTs OMZ
- COSPAR ID: 2006-021A
- SATCAT no.: 29228
- Website: eng.ntsomz.ru/ks_dzz/satellites/resurs_dk1
- Mission duration: 3 years (planned); 9 years, 7 months, 22 days (achieved)

Spacecraft properties
- Bus: Yantar
- Manufacturer: TsSKB-Progress
- Launch mass: 6,570 kg (14,480 lb)
- Payload mass: 1,200 kg (2,600 lb)
- Dimensions: 7.93 × 2.72 m (26.0 × 8.9 ft)

Start of mission
- Launch date: 15 June 2006, 08:00:00 UTC
- Rocket: Soyuz-U
- Launch site: Baikonur, Site 1/5
- Contractor: TsSKV-Progress

End of mission
- Disposal: Decommissioned
- Deactivated: 7 February 2016

Orbital parameters
- Reference system: Geocentric orbit
- Regime: Low Earth orbit
- Perigee altitude: 555.74 km (345.32 mi)
- Apogee altitude: 566.46 km (351.98 mi)
- Inclination: 69.94°
- Period: 95.88 minutes

Instruments
- Geoton-1; PAMELA; ARINA
- Russian Earth observation

Resurs-DK No.1, also called Resurs-DK1, was a commercial Earth observation satellite capable of transmitting high-resolution imagery (up to 0.9 m) to the ground stations as it passed overhead. The spacecraft was operated by NTs OMZ, the Russian Research Center for Earth Operative Monitoring.

The satellite was designed for multi-spectral remote sensing of the Earth's surface aimed at acquiring high-quality visible images in near real-time as well as on-line data delivery via radio link and providing a wide range of consumers with value-added processed data.

The Russian space tracking service, ASPOS OKP, reported that the spacecraft's onboard systems and attitude control had been terminated in February 2016. Tracking of the satellite was discontinued on 1 March 2016.

== Spacecraft ==
The Resurs-DK spacecraft was built by the Russian space company TsSKB-Progress in Samara, Russia. It was a modified version of the military reconnaissance satellite Yantar-4KS1 (Terilen). The spacecraft was three-axis stabilized. The design lifetime was no less than three years, with an expected lifetime of five years. Ground location accuracy was 100 m (330 ft). Onboard storage was 768 gigabits. Data link speed to the ground station was 300 Mbit/s. Maximum daily productivity was 1,000,000 km^{2} (390,000 sq mi).

Resurs is Russian for "Resource". The letters DK are the initials of Dmitry Kozlov, chief designer of the first satellite of the Yantar-2K class.

== Optical subsystem ==
- Type: apochromatic telephoto
- Focal length: 4000 mm
- Objective diameter: 500 mm
- Spectral range: 0.5–0.9 μm
- Mass: 310 kg

Made by Vavilov State Optical Institute, Russia.

== Spectral resolution ==
- 0.58–0.8 μm panchromatic
- 0.5–0.6 μm green
- 0.6–0.7 μm red
- 0.7–0.8 μm visible and near infrared

It was not possible to represent an image in true-color because there was no blue band (0.4–0.5 μm). However, it was possible to combine red, green and near infrared in such way that the appearance of the displayed image resembles a visible colour photograph, i.e. vegetation in green, water in blue, soil in brown. This was not always possible because two similarly coloured objects can have completely different reactions to near IR light.

Green, red and near IR are typically combined to make a traditional false color composite where the near IR is displayed in red, the red is displayed in green, and the green is displayed in blue. This combination is favoured by scientists because near IR is useful for detection of numerous vegetation types. Vegetation appear as redtones, the brighter the red, the healthier the vegetation. Soils with no or sparse vegetation range from white (sand, salt) to greens or browns depending on moisture and organic matter content. Water appears blue, clear water is dark blue to black while shallow waters or waters with high sediment concentrations are lighter blue. Urban areas will appear blue towards gray. Clouds and snow are white.

== Focal Plane Unit ==
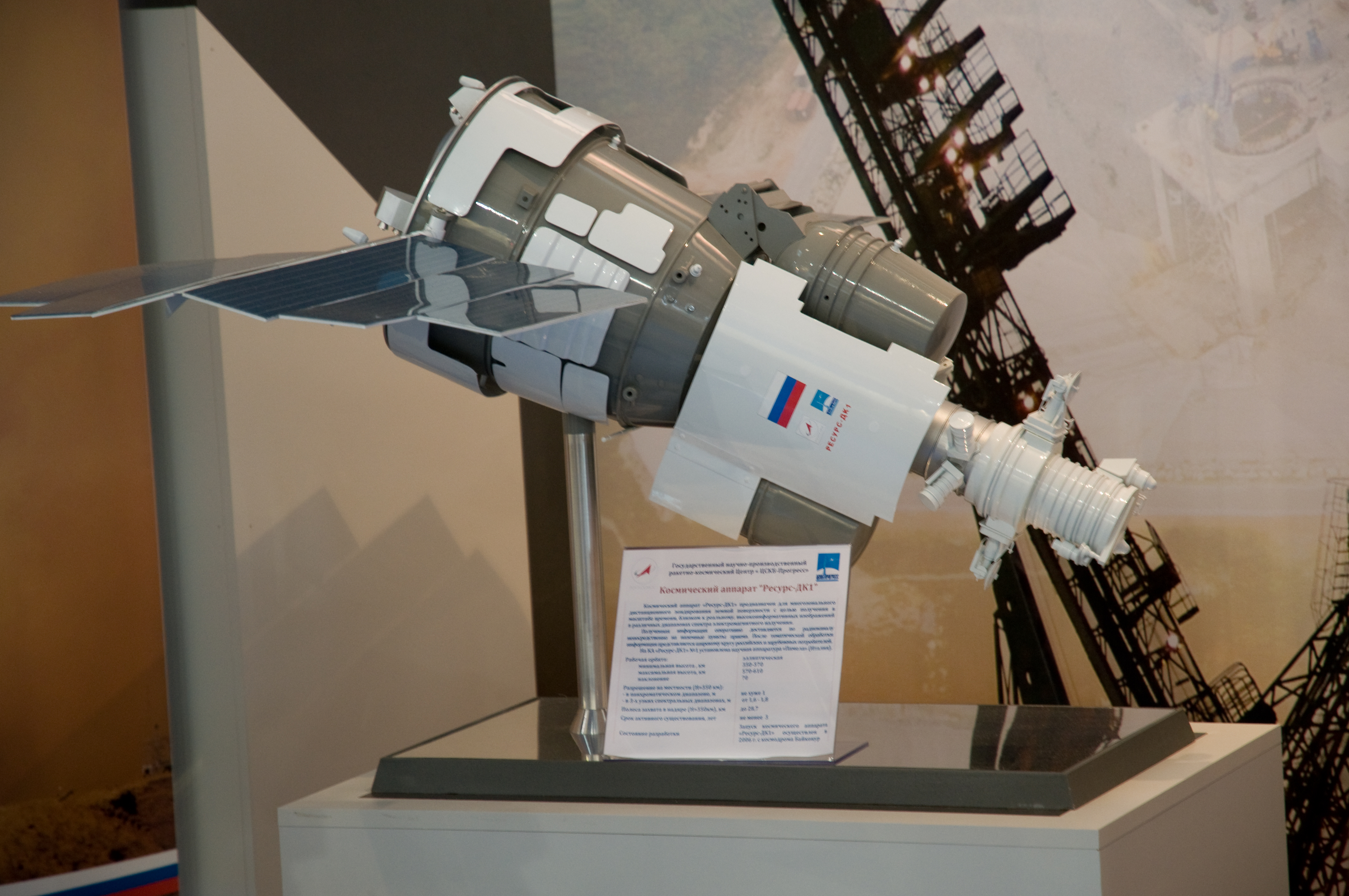

Unit featured 4 TDI (Time Delay and Integration) sensor arrays, one panchromatic and three multispectral. Each sensor array was composed of 36 "Kruiz" CCD chips. Effective length of the single array was about 36000 pixels. Arrays were grouped in 3 separated lines:

- near infrared
- panchromatic and red
- green

This separation was causing a time delay of the colour images combined from green, red and near infrared, so fast-moving objects were shown in triplets. Moving object speed and direction could be calculated. All 4 arrays could work simultaneously, so it was possible to combine panchromatic and 3 multispectral images in one pansharpened color composite.

The system used 10-bit analog-to-digital converters.

Focal Plane Unit was made by NPO Opteks, Russia .

=== CCD ===
The CCD "Kruiz" was a 1024 pixel x 128 line, high speed TDI sensor. The active imaging area was organized as 1024 vertical columns and 128 horizontal TDI rows.

- Pixel size: 9 x 9 μm
- Number of TDI stages electronically selectable: 128, 64, 32, 16, 8
- Two readout shift registers and two output amplifiers allowing twice faster readout
- Selftest without illumination
- Full well capacity: 120 000 electrons
- Dynamic range: 2500
- Charge transfer efficiency in any direction: more than 0.99998 per transfer
- Maximum quantum efficiency: 0.33 (at 0.72 μm).

== Spatial resolution ==
=== Panchromatic ===
At the altitude of 360 km:

- Nadir: 0.9 m
- 30° tilt: 1.0 m

At the altitude of 604 km:

- Nadir: 1.5 m
- 30° tilt: 1.7 m

=== Multispectral ===
1.5–2.0 m

== Temporal resolution ==
The revisit rate was 5 to 7 days off-nadir.

== Swath ==
Swath width at the altitude of 350 km:

- 4.7–28.3 km (at nadir)
- 40 km (at ± 30°)

== ARINA ==
Russian research hardware for detection of high-energy electrons and protons, their identification, detection of high-energy particle bursts – earthquake signs.

- Mass: 9 kg

== PAMELA ==
PAMELA, Payload for Antimatter Matter Exploration and Light-nuclei Astrophysics was an attached module built by Italian researchers with international partners. Its purpose was basic physics research of primary cosmic rays.

- Mass: 470 kg

== Major tasks ==
- Data supply for resource management and economical activity (inventory of natural resources, topographic and thematic mapping).
- Monitoring of pollution sources of the atmosphere, water and soil with the view of providing Federal and regional environmental authorities with the relevant information to make management decisions.
- On-line monitoring of man-caused and natural emergencies for the purpose of effective planning and timely performing of measures to eliminate damages.
- Supplying home and foreign consumers on a commercial basis.
- Research activities (PAMELA and ARINA experiments).

== Major orbit change ==
The satellite was initially placed in a 355 km × 573 km (221 mi × 356 mi) orbit in 2006. On 10 September 2010, its orbit was circularised to 567 km × 573 km (352 mi × 356 mi), with an inclination of 69.9°.

== See also ==
- Persona (satellite)
