= Molniya (satellite) =

Soviet military surveillance and communications satellites

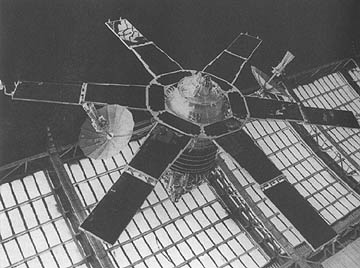
- Molniya 1
- Manufacturer: Experimental Design Bureau (OKB-1)
- Country of origin: USSR
- Operator: Experimental Design Bureau (OKB-1)
- Applications: Communications and surveillance

Specifications
- Bus: KAUR-2
- Launch mass: 1,600 kg (3,500 lb)
- Dimensions: 4.4 m tall, 1.4 m base diameter
- Power: 6 solar panels + batteries
- Regime: Molniya orbit
- Design life: 1.5 to 5 years

Production
- Status: Retired
- Launched: 164
- Maiden launch: Molniya 1-1, 23 April 1965
- Last launch: Molniya 1-93, 18 February 2004

The Molniya (Russian: Молния, IPA: [ˈmolnʲɪjə], "Lightning") series satellites were military and communications satellites launched by the Soviet Union from 1965 to 1991, and by the Russian Federation from 1991 to 2004. These satellites used highly eccentric elliptical orbits known as Molniya orbits, which have a long dwell time over high latitudes. They are suited for communications purposes in polar regions, in the same way that geostationary satellites are used for equatorial regions.

There were 164 Molniya satellites launched, all in Molniya orbits with the exception of Molniya 1S which was launched into geostationary orbit for testing purposes.

== History ==
In the early 1960s, when Europe and America were establishing geostationary communication satellites, the Russians found these orbits unsuitable. They were limited in the amount of rocket power available and it is extremely energy intensive to both launch a satellite to 40,000 km, and change its inclination to be over the equator, especially when launched from Russia. Additionally geostationary satellites give poor coverage in polar regions. A large portion of Russian territory consists of polar regions, making this arrangement even less favorable to Russian interests. As a result, OKB-1 sought an optimal orbit for the satellite. Studies found that this could be achieved using a large elliptical orbit, with an apogee over Russian territory. The satellite's name, "quick as lightning", is in reference to the speed with which it passes through the perigee.

Molniya series satellites were replaced (succeeded) by the Meridian series, with the first launch in 2006. As of 2023, there are currently 36 Molniya satellites left in orbit.

== Molniya 1 ==
The Molniya programme was authorized on 30 October 1961 and design was handled by OKB-1. They were based on the KAUR-2 satellite bus, with design finishing in 1963. The first launch took place on 4 June 1964 and ended in failure when the 8K78 booster core stage lost thrust 287 seconds into launch due to a jammed servo motor. The next attempt was on 22 August 1964 and reached orbit successfully, but the parabolic communications antennas did not properly deploy due to a design flaw in the release mechanism. Publicly referred to as Kosmos 41, it nonetheless operated for nine months. The first operational satellite, Molniya 1-1, was successfully launched on 23 April 1965. By 30 May 1966, the third Molniya 1 had taken the first images of the whole Earth in history.

The early Molniya-1 satellites were designed for television, telegraph and telephone across Russia, but they were also fitted with cameras used for weather monitoring, and possibly for assessing clear areas for Zenit spy satellites. The system was operational by 1967, with the construction of the Orbita groundstations.

They had a lifespan of approximately 1.5 years, as their orbits were disrupted by perturbations, as well as deteriorating solar arrays and they had to be constantly replaced.

By the 1970s, the Molniya 1 series (and the upgrade Molniya 1T) was mostly used for military communications, with civilian communications moving to Molniya 2.

In total 94 Molniya 1 series satellites were launched, with the last going up in 2004.

== Molniya 2 ==
The first Molniya 2 satellites were tested from 1971 with the first operational satellite launching in 1974 from Plesetsk. The used the same satellite bus and basic design as later model Molniya 1 satellites, but with an expanded number of users under the military's Unified System of Satellite Communications (YeSSS) program. Development was difficult because the final satellite bus was unpressurized, changing their selection of radios.

These satellites were used in the Soviet national Orbita television network, which had been established a few years earlier in 1967.

Only seventeen Molniya 2 series satellite were launched, as they were soon superseded by the Molniya 3.

== Molniya 3 ==
Originally called the Molniya-2M, their development began in 1972, with launches from 1974. They were also based on the KAUR-2 bus, launching solely from Plesetsk. Earlier models were used for civilian communications in a similar orbit, but different purpose, to the military-only Molniya-1 satellites. From 1980s they were used by the military, and by the 1990s they were operated in the same manner as the Molniya 1 satellites.

A total of 53 Molniya 3 series satellites were launched, with the last one going up in 2003.

== Orbital Properties ==
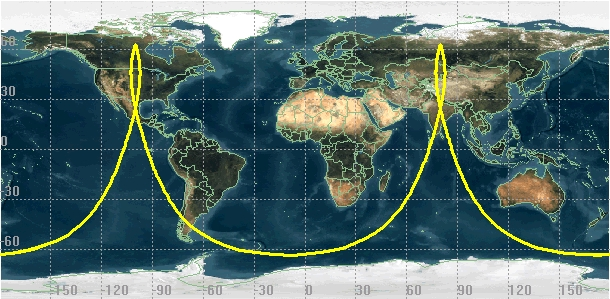
Groundtrack of Molniya orbit. In the operational part of the orbit (4 hours on each side of apogee), the satellite is north of 55.5° N (latitude of for example central Scotland, Moscow and southern part of Hudson Bay). A satellite in this orbits spends most of its time in the northern hemisphere and passes quickly over the southern hemisphere.

A typical Molniya series satellite, has:

- Semi-major axis: 26,600 km
- Eccentricity: 0.74
- Inclination: 63.4°
- Argument of perigee: 270°
- Period: 718 minutes

=== Inclination ===
In general, the oblateness of the Earth perturbs the argument of perigee ($\omega$), so that even if the apogee started near the north pole, it would gradually move unless constantly corrected with station-keeping thruster burns. Keeping the dwell point over Russia, and useful for communications necessitated without excessive fuel use meant that the satellites needed an inclination of 63.4°, for which these perturbations are zero.

=== Period ===
Similarly, to ensure the ground track repeats every 24 hours the nodal period needed to be half a sidereal day.

=== Eccentricity ===
To maximise the dwell time the eccentricity, the differences in altitudes of the apogee and perigee, had to be large.

However, the perigee needed to be far enough above the atmosphere to avoid drag, and the orbital period needed to be approximately half a sidereal day. These two factors constrained the eccentricity to become approximately 0.737.
