= 2011 in spaceflight =

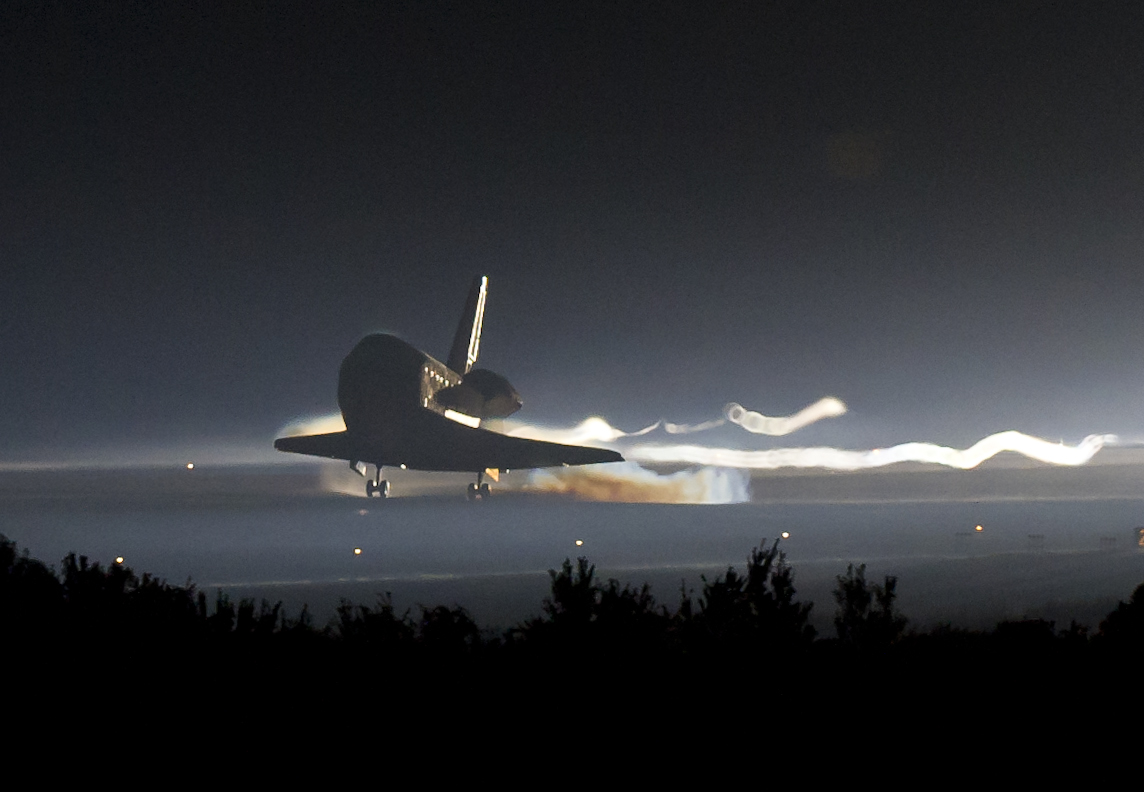
- Space Shuttle Atlantis lands at the Shuttle Landing Facility on 21 July 2011, completing the final mission of the Space Shuttle programme.

Orbital launches
- First: 20 January
- Last: 28 December
- Total: 84
- Successes: 78
- Failures: 6
- Catalogued: 80

National firsts
- Satellite: Isle of Man

Rockets
- Maiden flights: Zenit-3F; Long March 2F/G; Atlas V 541
- Retirements: Space Shuttle; Delta II Heavy

Crewed flights
- Orbital: 7
- Total travellers: 28
- EVAs: 10

2011 in spaceflight

The year 2011 saw a number of significant events in spaceflight, including the retirement of NASA's Space Shuttle after its final flight in July 2011, and the launch of China's first space station module, Tiangong-1, in September. A total of 84 orbital launches were conducted over the course of the year, of which 78 were successful. Russia, China and the United States conducted the majority of the year's orbital launches, with 35, 19 and 18 launches respectively; 2011 marked the first year that China conducted more successful launches than the United States. Seven crewed missions were launched into orbit during 2011, carrying a total of 28 astronauts to the International Space Station. Additionally, the Zenit-3F and Long March 2F/G carrier rockets made their maiden flights in 2011, while the Delta II Heavy made its last.

== Overview of orbital spaceflight ==
A total of 84 orbital launches were attempted in 2011, with 78 being reported as successful; 80 launches reached orbit. 35 launches were conducted using Russian and former Soviet rockets, whilst China launched 19 rockets, and the United States launched 18. Europe conducted five launches, India and Japan launched three rockets each, and Iran conducted one launch.

=== Crewed launches ===
Seven crewed spaceflights – four Soyuz and three Space Shuttle missions – were launched in 2011, carrying a total of 28 astronauts and cosmonauts into orbit. At the beginning of the year, the Expedition 26 crew was aboard the International Space Station (ISS). The first crewed flight of 2011 was STS-133, the final flight of the Space Shuttle Discovery, which launched from the Kennedy Space Center on 24 February. STS-133 carried Leonardo, the final American pressurised module of the ISS, for installation. Discovery returned to Earth on 9 March.

On 16 March, Expedition 27 began aboard the ISS with the departure of the Soyuz TMA-01M spacecraft, which had been docked since October 2010. On 4 April, Soyuz TMA-21 launched to the space station, delivering a further three crewmembers. On 16 May, Space Shuttle Space Shuttle Endeavour launched to the station on its final mission, STS-134, delivering and installing the Alpha Magnetic Spectrometer, before returning to Earth on 1 June. Expedition 28 began aboard the ISS on 23 May with the departure of Soyuz TMA-20, which had been launched in December 2010, and landed in the early morning of 24 May. Three more crewmembers were launched to the space station aboard Soyuz TMA-02M on 7 June.

The final Space Shuttle mission, STS-135, began on 8 July with the launch of Space Shuttle Atlantis, carrying supplies for the ISS aboard the Raffaello Multi-Purpose Logistics Module (MPLM). After resupplying the space station, Atlantis returned to Earth, landing at Kennedy Space Center's Shuttle Landing Facility at 09:57 UTC on 21 July, and concluding thirty years of Space Shuttle operations. Two days before landing, Atlantis deployed PSSC-2, the last satellite to be launched from a Space Shuttle.

On 29 September, China launched its first space station module, Tiangong-1, which was placed into orbit by a Long March 2F/G carrier rocket flying from the Jiuquan Satellite Launch Centre. Although no crewed missions to Tiangong-1 were conducted in 2011, the uncrewed Shenzhou 8 spacecraft, which was launched on 31 October, docked twice with the module to test its systems in preparation for a successful 2012 crewed docking.

ISS Expedition 28 ended, and Expedition 29 began, with the undocking of Soyuz TMA-21 on 16 September. The launch of Soyuz TMA-22 did not take place until 14 November, having been delayed by reliability concerns surrounding the Soyuz rocket after an uncrewed launch failure in August. A week later, Soyuz TMA-02M undocked, beginning Expedition 30, with the Soyuz spacecraft landing on 22 November. The final crewed launch of the year took place on 21 December, when Soyuz TMA-03M was launched to bring a further three crewmembers to the ISS.

Ten spacewalks were conducted in 2011, all of them by ISS or Space Shuttle astronauts. The final spacewalk by a Space Shuttle crew was conducted on 27 May, during the STS-134 mission.

=== Robotic exploration ===
Numerous scientific exploration missions were begun in 2011. In March 2011, the MESSENGER probe became the first artificial satellite of the planet Mercury. In July, the Dawn spacecraft became the first artificial satellite of the asteroid 4 Vesta. The Mars Science Laboratory – at the time, the largest Mars rover ever constructed – was launched in November, conducting a successful landing on Mars in August 2012.

=== Launch failures ===
Six orbital launches failed in 2011, four of which failed to achieve orbit and the remaining two reached lower orbits than expected. The first failure occurred on 1 February, when a Rokot with a Briz-KM upper stage placed Kosmos 2470 into a useless orbit, from which it could not recover. The failure was later traced to a software problem on the Briz-KM.

The next failure occurred on 4 March, when the payload fairing of a Taurus-XL failed to separate, resulting in the rocket being too heavy to reach orbit. The Glory climate research satellite was lost in the failure, along with the KySat-1, Hermes and Explorer-1 [PRIME] CubeSats. The previous Taurus-XL launch, carrying the Orbiting Carbon Observatory in February 2009, also failed due to the fairing not separating.

No more launch failures occurred until mid-August when, over the space of a week, three consecutive orbital launches failed. On 17 August, a Proton-M/Briz-M launched from the Baikonur Cosmodrome, carrying the Ekspress-AM4 communications satellite. In the morning of 18 August, the rocket's upper stage failed to conduct the fourth of five planned burns due to an attitude control system malfunction, leaving the spacecraft in a parking orbit. Later that same day, a Long March 2C launched from Jiuquan carrying the Shijian XI-04 satellite. The second stage vernier engine's mounting suffered a structural failure, resulting in a loss of control, and the rocket failed to reach orbit. Finally, on 24 August, a Soyuz-U carrying the Progress M-12M cargo spacecraft to the International Space Station suffered a third-stage engine failure and also failed to attain orbit.

The final launch failure of 2011 occurred on 23 December, when a Soyuz-2-1b/Fregat carrying the Meridian 5 satellite failed to achieve orbit due to a third-stage malfunction. Debris fell over Novosibirsk Oblast, with one piece hitting a house; however, no casualties were reported.

In November 2011, Russia's Fobos-Grunt Martian sample return probe launched successfully, but experienced a malfunction post-launch and became stranded in orbit. The spacecraft, which was Russia's first attempt at an interplanetary mission since the 1996 Mars 96 mission, disintegrated over the Pacific Ocean on 15 January 2012. China's first Mars probe, Yinghuo-1, which was being carried by the same rocket as Fobos-Grunt, was also lost in the incident.

== Orbital launches ==
- ← Jan
- Feb
- Mar
- Apr
- May
- Jun
- Jul
- Aug
- Sep
- Oct
- Nov
- Dec →

Date and time (UTC)	Rocket	Flight number	Launch site		LSP	
Date and time (UTC)	Payload (⚀ = CubeSat)	Operator	Orbit	Function	Decay (UTC)	Outcome
Date and time (UTC)	Remarks					
=== January ===
20 January; 12:29:01	(Ukraine) Zenit-3F		(Kazakhstan) Baikonur Site 45/1		(Russia) Roscosmos	
20 January; 12:29:01	(Russia) Elektro-L No.1	Roscosmos	Geostationary	Meteorology	In orbit	Operational
20 January; 12:29:01	Maiden flight of Zenit-3F.					
20 January; 21:10	(United States) Delta IV-H		(United States) Vandenberg SLC-6		(United States) United Launch Alliance	
20 January; 21:10	(United States) USA-224 (KH-11)	NRO	Low Earth	Earth observation	In orbit	Operational
20 January; 21:10	NRO Launch 49, first Delta IV Heavy launch from Vandenberg.					
22 January; 05:37:57	(Japan) H-IIB		(Japan) Tanegashima LA-Y2		(Japan) JAXA	
22 January; 05:37:57	(Japan) Kounotori 2 (HTV-2)	JAXA	Low Earth (ISS)	ISS logistics	30 March	Successful
28 January; 01:31:41	(Russia) Soyuz-U		(Kazakhstan) Baikonur Site 1/5		(Russia) Roscosmos	
28 January; 01:31:41	(Russia) Progress M-09M / 41P	Roscosmos	Low Earth (ISS)	ISS logistics	26 April; 13:22:53	Successful
28 January; 01:31:41	(Russia) Kedr	RKK Energia	Low Earth	Amateur radio	4 January 2012	Successful
← Jan; Feb; Mar; Apr; May; Jun; Jul; Aug; Sep; Oct; Nov; Dec →; === February ===
1 February; 14:00	(Russia) Rokot / Briz-KM		(Russia) Plesetsk Site 133/3		(Russia) VKS	
1 February; 14:00	(Russia) Kosmos 2470 (Geo-IK-2 No.11)	VKS	Low Earth	Geodesy	15 July 2013	Launch failure
1 February; 14:00	Upper stage malfunctioned due to problems with the flight software, reached lower orbit than planned.					
6 February; 12:26	(United States) Minotaur I		(United States) Vandenberg SLC-8		(United States) Orbital Sciences	
6 February; 12:26	(United States) USA-225 (RPP)	NRO	Low Earth	Technology demonstration	In orbit	Operational
6 February; 12:26	NRO Launch 66					
16 February; 21:50	(France) Ariane 5 ES		(France) Kourou ELA-3		(France) Arianespace	
16 February; 21:50	Johannes Kepler ATV	ESA	Low Earth (ISS)	ISS logistics	21 June	Successful
24 February; 21:53:24	(United States) Space Shuttle Discovery		(United States) Kennedy LC-39A		(United States) United Space Alliance	
24 February; 21:53:24	(United States) STS-133	NASA	Low Earth (ISS)	ISS logistics	9 March; 16:57:17	Successful
24 February; 21:53:24	(United Nations) Leonardo (PMM)	ASI / NASA	Low Earth (ISS)	ISS assembly	In orbit	Operational
24 February; 21:53:24	(United Nations) ExPRESS-4	NASA	Low Earth (ISS)	ISS logistics	In orbit	Operational
24 February; 21:53:24	Crewed flight, final flight of Discovery.					
26 February; 03:07	(Russia) Soyuz-2.1b / Fregat		(Russia) Plesetsk Site 43/4		(Russia) RVSN RF	
26 February; 03:07	(Russia) Kosmos 2471 (Glonass-K 701)	VKS	Medium Earth	Navigation	12 November 2021	Successful
← Jan; Feb; Mar; Apr; May; Jun; Jul; Aug; Sep; Oct; Nov; Dec →; === March ===
4 March; 10:09:43	(United States) Taurus-XL 3110		(United States) Vandenberg LC-576E		(United States) Orbital Sciences	
4 March; 10:09:43	(United States) Glory	NASA	Intended: Low Earth (SSO)	Climatology	4 March	Launch failure
4 March; 10:09:43	⚀ (United States) KySat-1	Kentucky Space	Intended: Low Earth	Technology demonstration	4 March	Launch failure
4 March; 10:09:43	⚀ (United States) Hermes	Colorado	Intended: Low Earth	Technology demonstration	4 March	Launch failure
4 March; 10:09:43	⚀ (United States) Explorer-1 [PRIME]	Montana State	Intended: Low Earth	Radiation	4 March	Launch failure
4 March; 10:09:43	All payloads CubeSats except Glory, which would have been part of the A-train constellation. Fairing failed to separate.					
5 March; 22:46	(United States) Atlas V 501		(United States) Cape Canaveral SLC-41		(United States) United Launch Alliance	
5 March; 22:46	(United States) USA-226 (X-37B FLT-2)	U.S. Air Force	Low Earth	Technology demonstration	16 June 2012; 12:48	Successful
11 March; 23:38	(United States) Delta IV-M+ (4,2)		(United States) Cape Canaveral SLC-37B		(United States) United Launch Alliance	
11 March; 23:38	(United States) USA-227 (SDS-3)	NRO	Geosynchronous	Communications	In orbit	Operational
11 March; 23:38	NRO Launch 27					
← Jan; Feb; Mar; Apr; May; Jun; Jul; Aug; Sep; Oct; Nov; Dec →; === April ===
4 April; 22:18:20	(Russia) Soyuz-FG		(Kazakhstan) Baikonur Site 1/5		(Russia) Roscosmos	
4 April; 22:18:20	(Russia) Soyuz TMA-21	Roscosmos	Low Earth (ISS)	Expedition 27/28	16 September; 03:59:39	Successful
9 April; 20:47:04	(China) Long March 3A		(China) Xichang LC-3		(China) CNSA	
9 April; 20:47:04	(China) Compass-IGSO3	CNSA	IGSO	Navigation	In orbit	Operational
14 April; 04:24	(United States) Atlas V 411		(United States) Vandenberg SLC-3E		(United States) United Launch Alliance	
14 April; 04:24	(United States) USA-229 (NOSS)	NRO	Low Earth	ELINT	In orbit	Operational
14 April; 04:24	(United States) USA-229 (NOSS)	NRO	Low Earth	ELINT	In orbit	Operational
14 April; 04:24	NRO Launch 34					
20 April; 04:42	(India) PSLV		(India) Satish Dhawan FLP		(India) ISRO	
20 April; 04:42	(India) Resourcesat-2	ISRO	Low Earth (SSO)	Earth observation	In orbit	Operational
20 April; 04:42	(India) (Russia) YouthSat	ISRO / MGU	Low Earth (SSO)	Education	In orbit	Operational
20 April; 04:42	(Singapore) X-Sat	CREST	Low Earth (SSO)	Technology demonstration	In orbit	Operational
22 April; 21:37	(France) Ariane 5 ECA		(France) Kourou ELA-3		(France) Arianespace	
22 April; 21:37	(United Arab Emirates) Yahsat 1A	Yahsat	Geosynchronous	Communications	In orbit	Operational
22 April; 21:37	(United Nations) New Dawn	Intelsat	Geosynchronous	Communications	In orbit	Partial spacecraft failure
22 April; 21:37	New Dawn's C-Band antenna failed to deploy.					
27 April; 13:05:21	(Russia) Soyuz-U		(Kazakhstan) Baikonur Site 1/5		(Russia) Roscosmos	
27 April; 13:05:21	(Russia) Progress M-10M / 42P	Roscosmos	Low Earth (ISS)	ISS logistics	29 October; 13:00:31	Successful
← Jan; Feb; Mar; Apr; May; Jun; Jul; Aug; Sep; Oct; Nov; Dec →; === May ===
4 May; 17:41:33	(Russia) Soyuz-2.1a / Fregat		(Russia) Plesetsk Site 43/4		(Russia) RVSN RF	
4 May; 17:41:33	(Russia) Meridian 4	VKS	Medium Earth	Communications	In orbit	Operational
7 May; 18:10	(United States) Atlas V 401		(United States) Cape Canaveral SLC-41		(United States) United Launch Alliance	
7 May; 18:10	(United States) USA-230 (SBIRS-GEO 1)	U.S. Air Force	Geosynchronous	Missile defense	In orbit	Operational
16 May; 12:56	(United States) Space Shuttle Endeavour		(United States) Kennedy LC-39A		(United States) United Space Alliance	
16 May; 12:56	(United States) STS-134	NASA	Low Earth (ISS)	ISS logistics	1 June; 06:35	Successful
16 May; 12:56	(United Nations) AMS-02	NASA	Low Earth (ISS)	Cosmic-ray observatory	In orbit	Operational
16 May; 12:56	(United Nations) ExPRESS-3	NASA	Low Earth (ISS)	ISS logistics	In orbit	Operational
16 May; 12:56	Crewed flight, final flight of Endeavour.					
20 May; 19:15	(Russia) Proton-M/Briz-M Enhanced		(Kazakhstan) Baikonur Site 200/39		(Russia) (United States) International Launch Services	
20 May; 19:15	(Canada) Telstar 14R	Telesat	Geosynchronous	Communications	In orbit	Partial spacecraft failure
20 May; 19:15	Second solar panel failed to deploy due to tangled cable					
20 May; 20:38	(France) Ariane 5 ECA		(France) Kourou ELA-3		(France) Arianespace	
20 May; 20:38	(Singapore) (Taiwan) ST-2	SingTel / Chunghwa	Geosynchronous	Communications	In orbit	Operational
20 May; 20:38	(India) INSAT-4G/GSAT-8	ISRO	Geosynchronous	Communications	In orbit	Operational
← Jan; Feb; Mar; Apr; May; Jun; Jul; Aug; Sep; Oct; Nov; Dec →; === June ===
7 June; 20:12:45	(Russia) Soyuz-FG		(Kazakhstan) Baikonur Site 1/5		(Russia) Roscosmos	
7 June; 20:12:45	(Russia) Soyuz TMA-02M	Roscosmos	Low Earth (ISS)	Expedition 28/29	22 November; 02:26	Successful
10 June; 14:20	(United States) Delta II 7320		(United States) Vandenberg SLC-2W		(United States) United Launch Alliance	
10 June; 14:20	(Argentina) (United States) SAC-D	CONAE / NASA	Low Earth (SSO)	Oceanography	In orbit	Operational
10 June; 14:20	Final scheduled flight of Delta II 7300 series; spacecraft carrying NASA's Aquarius instrument.					
15 June; 09:14	(Iran) Safir-1A	UIS.0001	(Iran) Semnan LP-1		(Iran) ISA	
15 June; 09:14	(Iran) Rasad 1	ISA	Low Earth	Earth observation	6 July 2011	Successful
20 June; 16:13	(China) Long March 3B		(China) Xichang LC-2		(China) CNSA	
20 June; 16:13	(China) ChinaSat 10	China Satellite Communications	Geosynchronous	Communications	In orbit	Operational
21 June; 14:38	(Russia) Soyuz-U		(Kazakhstan) Baikonur Site 1/5		(Russia) Roscosmos	
21 June; 14:38	(Russia) Progress M-11M / 43P	Roscosmos	Low Earth (ISS)	ISS logistics	1 September; 10:21:41	Successful
27 June; 16:00	(Russia) Soyuz-U		(Russia) Plesetsk Site 16/2		(Russia) VKS	
27 June; 16:00	(Russia) Kosmos 2472 (Kobalt-M No.7)	VKS	Low Earth	Reconnaissance	24 October	Successful
30 June; 03:09	(United States) Minotaur I		(United States) MARS LP-0B		(United States) Orbital Sciences	
30 June; 03:09	(United States) USA-231 (ORS-1)	ORSO	Low Earth	Reconnaissance	12 March 2018	Successful
← Jan; Feb; Mar; Apr; May; Jun; Jul; Aug; Sep; Oct; Nov; Dec →; === July ===
6 July; 04:28	(China) Long March 2C		(China) Jiuquan SLS-2		(China) CNSA	
6 July; 04:28	(China) Shijian 11-03	CNSA	Low Earth (SSO)	Technology demonstration	In orbit	Operational
8 July; 15:29	(United States) Space Shuttle Atlantis		(United States) Kennedy LC-39A		(United States) United Space Alliance	
8 July; 15:29	(United States) STS-135	NASA	Low Earth (ISS)	ISS logistics	21 July 2011; 09:57	Successful
8 July; 15:29	(Italy) (United States) Raffaelo MPLM	NASA	Low Earth (ISS)	ISS logistics	21 July 2011; 09:57	Successful
8 July; 15:29	(United States) PSSC-2	U.S. Air Force	Low Earth	Technology demonstration	8 December	Successful
8 July; 15:29	Crewed flight, final flight of Atlantis and of Space Shuttle programme.					
11 July; 15:41	(China) Long March 3C		(China) Xichang LC-2		(China) CNSA	
11 July; 15:41	(China) Tianlian I-02 (1B)	CNSA	Geosynchronous	Communications	In orbit	Operational
13 July; 02:27	(Russia) Soyuz-2.1a / Fregat		(Kazakhstan) Baikonur Site 31/6		(France) (Russia) Starsem	
13 July; 02:27	(United States) Globalstar M081	Globalstar	Low Earth	Communications	In orbit	Operational
13 July; 02:27	(United States) Globalstar M083	Globalstar	Low Earth	Communications	In orbit	Operational
13 July; 02:27	(United States) Globalstar M085	Globalstar	Low Earth	Communications	In orbit	Operational
13 July; 02:27	(United States) Globalstar M088	Globalstar	Low Earth	Communications	In orbit	Operational
13 July; 02:27	(United States) Globalstar M089	Globalstar	Low Earth	Communications	In orbit	Operational
13 July; 02:27	(United States) Globalstar M091	Globalstar	Low Earth	Communications	In orbit	Operational
15 July; 11:18	(India) PSLV-XL		(India) Satish Dhawan FLP		(India) ISRO	
15 July; 11:18	(India) GSAT-12	ISRO	Geosynchronous	Communications	In orbit	Operational
15 July; 23:16	(Russia) Proton-M / Briz-M Enhanced		(Kazakhstan) Baikonur Site 200/39		(Russia) (United States) International Launch Services	
15 July; 23:16	(Netherlands) SES-3	SES World Skies (July–September); SES S.A. (September—)	Geosynchronous	Communications	In orbit	Operational
15 July; 23:16	(Kazakhstan) KazSat-2	JSC KazSat	Geosynchronous	Communications	In orbit	Operational
16 July; 06:41	(United States) Delta IV-M+ (4,2)		(United States) Cape Canaveral SLC-37B		(United States) United Launch Alliance	
16 July; 06:41	(United States) USA-232 (GPS-IIF-2)	U.S. Air Force	Medium Earth	Navigation	In orbit	Operational
16 July; 06:41	Named after Star Sirius.					
18 July; 02:31	(Ukraine) (Russia) Zenit-3F		(Kazakhstan) Baikonur Site 45/1		(Russia) Roscosmos	
18 July; 02:31	(Russia) Spektr-R (RadioAstron)	Roscosmos	High Earth	Radio astronomy	30 May 2019	Successful
18 July; 02:31	Russian scientific satellite with a 10 m (33 ft) radio telescope on board. Together with some of the largest ground-based radio telescopes, the Spektr-R formed interferometric baselines extending up to 350,000 km (220,000 mi).					
26 July; 21:44	(China) Long March 3A		(China) Xichang LC-3		(China) CNSA	
26 July; 21:44	(China) Compass-IGSO4	CNSA	IGSO	Navigation	In orbit	Operational
29 July; 07:42	(China) Long March 2C		(China) Jiuquan SLS-2		(China) CNSA	
29 July; 07:42	(China) Shijian 11-02	CNSA	Low Earth (SSO)	Technology demonstration	In orbit	Operational
← Jan; Feb; Mar; Apr; May; Jun; Jul; Aug; Sep; Oct; Nov; Dec →; === August ===
5 August; 16:25	(United States) Atlas V 551		(United States) Cape Canaveral SLC-41		(United States) United Launch Alliance	
5 August; 16:25	(United States) Juno	NASA	Jovicentric	Jupiter orbiter	In orbit	Operational
6 August; 22:52	(France) Ariane 5 ECA		(France) Kourou ELA-3		(France) Arianespace	
6 August; 22:52	(Luxembourg) Astra 1N	SES Astra (August–September); SES S.A. (September—)	Geosynchronous	Communications	In orbit	Operational
6 August; 22:52	(Japan) BSAT-3c / JCSAT-110R	BSAT / JSAT	Geosynchronous	Communications	In orbit	Operational
11 August; 16:15	(China) Long March 3B/E		(China) Xichang LC-2		(China) CNSA	
11 August; 16:15	(Pakistan) Paksat-1R	SUPARCO	Geosynchronous	Communications	In orbit	Operational
15 August; 22:57	(China) Long March 4B		(China) Taiyuan LC-2		(China) CNSA	
15 August; 22:57	(China) Hai Yang 2A	CAST	Low Earth (SSO)	Oceanography	In orbit	Operational
17 August; 07:12	(Ukraine) Dnepr		(Russia) Dombarovsky Site 13		(Russia) ISC Kosmotras	
17 August; 07:12	(Ukraine) Sich-2	NKAU	Low Earth (SSO)	Earth observation	In orbit	Operational
17 August; 07:12	(Nigeria) NigeriaSat-2	NASRDA	Low Earth (SSO)	Earth observation	In orbit	Operational
17 August; 07:12	(Nigeria) NigeriaSat-X	NASRDA	Low Earth (SSO)	Technology demonstration	In orbit	Operational
17 August; 07:12	(Turkey) RASAT	TÜBİTAK	Low Earth (SSO)	Earth observation	In orbit	Successful
17 August; 07:12	(Italy) EduSAT	GAUSS Srl	Low Earth (SSO)	Technology demonstration	In orbit	Operational
17 August; 07:12	(Canada) AprizeSat-5	exactEarth	Low Earth (SSO)	Communications	In orbit	Operational
17 August; 07:12	(Canada) AprizeSat-6	exactEarth	Low Earth (SSO)	Communications	In orbit	Operational
17 August; 07:12	(Ukraine) BPA-2	Hartron-Arkos	Low Earth (SSO)	Technology demonstration	In orbit	Successful
17 August; 21:25	(Russia) Proton-M / Briz-M Enhanced		(Kazakhstan) Baikonur Site 200/39		(Russia) Khrunichev	
17 August; 21:25	(Russia) Ekspress AM-4	RSCC	Intended: Geosynchronous; Achieved: GTO	Communications	25 March 2012	Launch failure
17 August; 21:25	Briz-M upper stage failed before the planned fourth burn. An insufficient time slot was allocated for re-setting the gyroscopes of the upper stage control system before launch, which led to loss of adequate attitude control in flight.					
18 August; 09:28	(China) Long March 2C		(China) Jiuquan SLS-2		(China) CNSA	
18 August; 09:28	(China) Shijian 11-04	CNSA	Intended: Low Earth (SSO)	Technology demonstration	18 August	Launch failure
18 August; 09:28	Failed to reach orbit. Second stage's vernier engine support structure failed in flight, led to loss of attitude control.					
24 August; 13:00	(Russia) Soyuz-U		(Kazakhstan) Baikonur Site 1/5		(Russia) Roscosmos	
24 August; 13:00	(Russia) Progress M-12M / 44P	Roscosmos	Intended: Low Earth (ISS)	ISS logistics	24 August	Launch failure
24 August; 13:00	Third stage engine failure 325 seconds after launch due to the gas generator fuel supply pipeline being blocked by contaminants.					
← Jan; Feb; Mar; Apr; May; Jun; Jul; Aug; Sep; Oct; Nov; Dec →; === September ===
10 September; 13:08:52	(United States) Delta II 7920H		(United States) Cape Canaveral SLC-17B		(United States) United Launch Alliance	
10 September; 13:08:52	(United States) GRAIL-A (Ebb)	NASA	Selenocentric	Lunar orbiter	17 December 2012; 22:28:51	Successful
10 September; 13:08:52	(United States) GRAIL-B (Flow)	NASA	Selenocentric	Lunar orbiter	17 December 2012; 22:29:21	Successful
10 September; 13:08:52	Final launch of Delta II Heavy, final Delta II launch from Cape Canaveral, and last launch from SLC-17.					
18 September; 16:33	(China) Long March 3B/E		(China) Xichang LC-2		(China) CNSA	
18 September; 16:33	(China) Chinasat-1A	China Satcom	Geosynchronous	Communications	In orbit	Operational
20 September; 22:47	(Russia) Proton-M / Briz-M		(Kazakhstan) Baikonur Site 81/24		(Russia) Khrunichev	
20 September; 22:47	(Russia) Kosmos 2473 (Garpun #1)	VKS	Geosynchronous	Communications	In orbit	Operational
21 September; 21:38	(France) Ariane 5 ECA		(France) Kourou ELA-3		(France) Arianespace	
21 September; 21:38	(Saudi Arabia) Arabsat 5C	Arabsat	Geosynchronous	Communications	In orbit	Operational
21 September; 21:38	(Netherlands) SES-2	SES S.A.	Geosynchronous	Communications	In orbit	Operational
23 September; 04:36:50	(Japan) H-IIA		(Japan) Tanegashima LA-Y1		(Japan) MHI	
23 September; 04:36:50	(Japan) IGS Optical 4	CSICE	Low Earth (SSO)	Reconnaissance	In orbit	Successful
24 September; 20:18	(Ukraine) Zenit-3SL		(Norway) Ocean Odyssey		(United Nations) Sea Launch	
24 September; 20:18	(United States) Atlantic Bird 7	Eutelsat	Geosynchronous	Communications	In orbit	Operational
27 September; 15:49	(United States) Minotaur IV+		(United States) Kodiak LP-1		(United States) Orbital Sciences	
27 September; 15:49	(United States) TacSat-4	U.S. Air Force	Highly elliptical	Technology demonstration	In orbit	Operational
29 September; 13:16:03	(China) Long March 2F/G	T1	(China) Jiuquan SLS-1		(China) CNSA	
29 September; 13:16:03	(China) Tiangong-1	CMSA	Low Earth	Space station	2 April 2018; 00:16	Successful
29 September; 13:16:03	Maiden flight of Long March 2F/G, first Chinese space station prototype.					
29 September; 18:32	(Russia) Proton-M / Briz-M Enhanced		(Kazakhstan) Baikonur Site 200/39		(Russia) (United States) International Launch Services	
29 September; 18:32	(Isle of Man) QuetzSat 1	SES Satellite Leasing	Geosynchronous	Communications	In orbit	Operational
29 September; 18:32	Intended for lease to QuetzSat.					
← Jan; Feb; Mar; Apr; May; Jun; Jul; Aug; Sep; Oct; Nov; Dec →; === October ===
2 October; 20:15	(Russia) Soyuz-2.1b / Fregat		(Russia) Plesetsk Site 43/4		(Russia) RVSN RF	
2 October; 20:15	(Russia) Kosmos 2474 (Glonass-M 742)	VKS	Medium Earth	Navigation	In orbit	Operational
5 October; 21:00	(Ukraine) Zenit-3SLB		(Kazakhstan) Baikonur Site 45/1		(United Nations) Land Launch	
5 October; 21:00	(United Nations) Intelsat 18	Intelsat	Geosynchronous	Communications	In orbit	Operational
7 October; 08:21	(China) Long March 3B/E		(China) Xichang LC-2		(China) CNSA	
7 October; 08:21	(France) Eutelsat W3C	Eutelsat	Geosynchronous	Communications	In orbit	Operational
12 October; 05:31	(India) PSLV-CA		(India) Satish Dhawan FLP		(India) ISRO	
12 October; 05:31	(India) (France) Megha-Tropiques	ISRO / CNES	Low Earth	Climatology	7 March 2023	Successful
12 October; 05:31	(India) SRMSAT	SRM	Low Earth	Climatology	In orbit	Operational
12 October; 05:31	(Luxembourg) VesselSat-1	Luxspace	Low Earth	Communications	In orbit	Operational
12 October; 05:31	⚀ (India) Jugnu	IITK	Low Earth	Earth observation	In orbit	Operational
19 October; 18:48	(Russia) Proton-M / Briz-M Enhanced		(Kazakhstan) Baikonur Site 200/39		(Russia) (United States) International Launch Services	
19 October; 18:48	(Isle of Man) ViaSat-1	ViaSat-IOM / ManSat	Geosynchronous	Communications	In orbit	Operational
21 October; 10:30	(Russia) Soyuz ST-B / Fregat-MT		(France) Kourou ELS		(France) Arianespace	
21 October; 10:30	Galileo IOV 1	ESA	Medium Earth	Navigation / Technology demonstration	In orbit	Operational
21 October; 10:30	Galileo IOV 2	ESA	Medium Earth	Navigation / Technology demonstration	In orbit	Operational
21 October; 10:30	First Soyuz launch from Kourou.					
28 October; 09:48:01	(United States) Delta II 7920-10		(United States) Vandenberg SLC-2W		(United States) United Launch Alliance	
28 October; 09:48:01	(United States) NPP	NASA / NOAA	Low Earth	Meteorology	In orbit	Operational
28 October; 09:48:01	⚀ (United States) AubieSat 1	Auburn University	Low Earth	Technology demonstration	In orbit	Operational
28 October; 09:48:01	⚀ (United States) DICE-1	Space Dynamics Laboratory	Low Earth	Magnetospheric research	In orbit	Operational
28 October; 09:48:01	⚀ (United States) DICE-2	Space Dynamics Laboratory	Low Earth	Magnetospheric research	In orbit	Operational
28 October; 09:48:01	⚀ (United States) E1P-U2	Montana State	Low Earth	Radiation	In orbit	Operational
28 October; 09:48:01	⚀ (United States) M-Cubed	University of Michigan	Low Earth	Technology demonstration	In orbit	Operational
28 October; 09:48:01	⚀ (United States) RAX-2	University of Michigan	Low Earth	Auroral	In orbit	Operational
30 October; 10:11	(Russia) Soyuz-U		(Kazakhstan) Baikonur Site 1/5		(Russia) Roscosmos	
30 October; 10:11	(Russia) Progress M-13M / 45P	Roscosmos	Low Earth (ISS)	ISS logistics	25 January 2012	Successful
30 October; 10:11	(Russia) Chibis-M (RS-39)	IKI	Low Earth	Ionospheric research	15 October 2014	Successful
31 October; 21:58:10	(China) Long March 2F	Y8	(China) Jiuquan SLS-1		(China) CNSA	
31 October; 21:58:10	(China) Shenzhou 8	CMSA	Low Earth (Tiangong-1)	Technology demonstration	17 November; 11:36	Successful
31 October; 21:58:10	(China) Shenzhou-8-GC	CMSA	Low Earth (Tiangong-1)	Technology demonstration	2 April 2012	Successful
31 October; 21:58:10	Uncrewed flight, first Chinese orbital docking.					
← Jan; Feb; Mar; Apr; May; Jun; Jul; Aug; Sep; Oct; Nov; Dec →; === November ===
4 November; 12:51:41	(Russia) Proton-M / Briz-M		(Kazakhstan) Baikonur Site 81/24		(Russia) Khrunichev	
4 November; 12:51:41	(Russia) Kosmos 2475 (Glonass-M 743)	VKS	Medium Earth	Navigation	In orbit	Operational
4 November; 12:51:41	(Russia) Kosmos 2476 (Glonass-M 744)	VKS	Medium Earth	Navigation	In orbit	Operational
4 November; 12:51:41	(Russia) Kosmos 2477 (Glonass-M 745)	VKS	Medium Earth	Navigation	In orbit	Operational
8 November; 20:16	(Ukraine) Zenit-2M		(Kazakhstan) Baikonur Site 45/1		(Russia) Roscosmos	
8 November; 20:16	(Russia) Fobos-Grunt	Roscosmos	Intended: Areocentric; Achieved: Low Earth	Phobos sample return	15 January 2012	Spacecraft failure
8 November; 20:16	(China) Yinghuo-1	CNSA	Intended: Areocentric; Achieved: Low Earth	Mars orbiter	15 January 2012	Spacecraft failure
8 November; 20:16	First Russian attempt at an interplanetary mission since 1996. First Chinese Mars probe Spacecraft stranded in low Earth orbit, as telemetry was lost soon after launch and the two trans-Martian injection burns by the payload did not take place					
9 November; 03:21	(China) Long March 4B		(China) Taiyuan LC-2		(China) CNSA	
9 November; 03:21	(China) Yaogan 12	CNSA	Low Earth (SSO)	Reconnaissance	In orbit	Operational
9 November; 03:21	(China) Tian Xun 1	Nanjing University of Aeronautics and Astronautics	Low Earth (SSO)	Technology demonstration	7 February 2016	Successful
14 November; 04:14	(Russia) Soyuz-FG		(Kazakhstan) Baikonur Site 1/5		(Russia) Roscosmos	
14 November; 04:14	(Russia) Soyuz TMA-22	Roscosmos	Low Earth (ISS)	Expedition 29/30	27 April 2012	Successful
20 November; 00:15	(China) Long March 2D		(China) Jiuquan SLS-2		(China) CNSA	
20 November; 00:15	(China) Shiyan 4	CNSA	Low Earth (SSO)	Technology demonstration	In orbit	Operational
20 November; 00:15	(China) Chuang Xin 1C	CNSA	Low Earth (SSO)	Technology demonstration	In orbit	Operational
25 November; 19:10:34	(Russia) Proton-M / Briz-M Enhanced		(Kazakhstan) Baikonur Site 200/39		(Russia) (United States) International Launch Services	
25 November; 19:10:34	(China) AsiaSat 7	AsiaSat	Geosynchronous	Communications	In orbit	Operational
26 November; 15:02	(United States) Atlas V 541		(United States) Cape Canaveral SLC-41		(United States) United Launch Alliance	
26 November; 15:02	(United States) Mars Science Laboratory (Curiosity)	NASA	TMI to Martian Surface	Mars rover	6 August 2012; 05:18	Successful
26 November; 15:02	Maiden flight of Atlas V 541, largest Mars rover yet launched.					
28 November; 08:25:57	(Russia) Soyuz-2.1b / Fregat		(Russia) Plesetsk Site 43/4		(Russia) RVSN RF	
28 November; 08:25:57	(Russia) Kosmos 2478 (Glonass-M 746)	VKS	Medium Earth	Navigation	In orbit	Operational
29 November; 18:50	(China) Long March 2C		(China) Taiyuan LC-2		(China) CNSA	
29 November; 18:50	(China) Yaogan 13	CNSA	Low Earth (SSO)	Reconnaissance	In orbit	Operational
← Jan; Feb; Mar; Apr; May; Jun; Jul; Aug; Sep; Oct; Nov; Dec →; === December ===
1 December; 21:07	(China) Long March 3A		(China) Xichang LC-3		(China) CNSA	
1 December; 21:07	(China) Compass-IGSO5	CNSA	IGSO	Navigation	In orbit	Operational
11 December; 11:17	(Russia) Proton-M / Briz-M Enhanced		(Kazakhstan) Baikonur Site 81/24		(Russia) Roscosmos	
11 December; 11:17	(Russia) Luch 5A	Gonets Satellite System	Geosynchronous	Communications	In orbit	Operational
11 December; 11:17	(Israel) Amos-5	SCL	Geosynchronous	Communications	In orbit	Operational
12 December; 01:21	(Japan) H-IIA		(Japan) Tanegashima LA-Y1		(Japan) MHI	
12 December; 01:21	(Japan) IGS Radar 3	CSICE	Low Earth (SSO)	Reconnaissance (radar)	In orbit	Operational
17 December; 02:03:08	(Russia) Soyuz ST-A / Fregat		(France) Kourou ELS		(France) Arianespace	
17 December; 02:03:08	(France) Pléiades-HR 1A	CNES	Low Earth (SSO)	Earth observation/Reconnaissance	In orbit	Operational
17 December; 02:03:08	(Chile) FASat-Charlie (SSOT)	MDN	Low Earth (SSO)	Earth observation/Reconnaissance	In orbit	Operational
17 December; 02:03:08	(France) ELISA 1	CNES / DGA	Low Earth (SSO)	ELINT	In orbit	Operational
17 December; 02:03:08	(France) ELISA 2	CNES / DGA	Low Earth (SSO)	ELINT	In orbit	Operational
17 December; 02:03:08	(France) ELISA 3	CNES / DGA	Low Earth (SSO)	ELINT	In orbit	Operational
17 December; 02:03:08	(France) ELISA 4	CNES / DGA	Low Earth (SSO)	ELINT	In orbit	Operational
19 December; 16:41	(China) Long March 3B/E		(China) Xichang LC-2		(China) CNSA	
19 December; 16:41	(Nigeria) NigComSat-1R	NIGCOMSAT / NASRDA	Geosynchronous	Communications	In orbit	Operational
21 December; 13:16	(Russia) Soyuz-FG		(Kazakhstan) Baikonur Site 1/5		(Russia) Roscosmos	
21 December; 13:16	(Russia) Soyuz TMA-03M	Roscosmos	Low Earth (ISS)	Expedition 30/31	1 July 2012; 08:14	Successful
22 December; 03:26	(China) Long March 4B		(China) Taiyuan LC-2		(China) CNSA	
22 December; 03:26	(China) Ziyuan 1-02C	CNSA	Low Earth (SSO)	Earth observation	In orbit	Operational
23 December; 12:08	(Russia) Soyuz-2.1b / Fregat		(Russia) Plesetsk Site 43/4		(Russia) VKO	
23 December; 12:08	(Russia) Meridian 5	VKO	Intended: Molniya	Communications	23 December	Launch failure
23 December; 12:08	Third stage engine malfunctioned 421 seconds after launch, failed to reach orbit; first launch conducted by the Russian Aerospace Defence Forces					
28 December; 17:09	(Russia) Soyuz-2.1a / Fregat		(Kazakhstan) Baikonur Site 31/6		(France) (Russia) Starsem	
28 December; 17:09	(United States) Globalstar M080	Globalstar	Low Earth	Communications	In orbit	Operational
28 December; 17:09	(United States) Globalstar M082	Globalstar	Low Earth	Communications	In orbit	Operational
28 December; 17:09	(United States) Globalstar M084	Globalstar	Low Earth	Communications	In orbit	Operational
28 December; 17:09	(United States) Globalstar M086	Globalstar	Low Earth	Communications	In orbit	Operational
28 December; 17:09	(United States) Globalstar M090	Globalstar	Low Earth	Communications	In orbit	Operational
28 December; 17:09	(United States) Globalstar M092	Globalstar	Low Earth	Communications	In orbit	Operational

- ← Jan
- Feb
- Mar
- Apr
- May
- Jun
- Jul
- Aug
- Sep
- Oct
- Nov
- Dec →

== Suborbital flights ==
Date and time (UTC)	Rocket	Flight number	Launch site		LSP	
Date and time (UTC)	Payload (⚀ = CubeSat)	Operator	Orbit	Function	Decay (UTC)	Outcome
Date and time (UTC)	Remarks					
22 January; 06:10	(United States) Terrier-Oriole		(United States) Wallops Island		(United States) MDA	
22 January; 06:10	(United States) Aegis Radar Test	MDA	Suborbital	Radar target	22 January	Successful
22 January; 06:10	Aegis Radar target, not intercepted, Apogee: 100 kilometres (62 mi)					
28 January; 10:46:00	(Canada) Black Brant IX		(United States) Poker Flat		(United States) NASA	
28 January; 10:46:00	(United States) FIRE	Colorado	Suborbital	Astronomy	28 January	Spacecraft failure
5 February; 08:11:11	(Canada) Black Brant IX		(United States) Poker Flat		(United States) NASA	
5 February; 08:11:11	(United States) Polar NOx	VPI	Suborbital	Geospace	5 February	Spacecraft failure
February	(Iran) Shahab-3		(Iran)		(Iran) IRGC	
February		IGRC	Suborbital	Missile test	February	Successful
February	Two missiles with a range of 1,900 kilometres were fired into the Indian Ocean prior to 19 February					
February	(Iran) Sejjil-2		(Iran)		(Iran) IRGC	
February		IGRC	Suborbital	Missile test	February	Successful
February	Two missiles with a range of 1,900 kilometres were fired into the Indian Ocean prior to 19 February					
1 March; 21:00	(United States) UGM-133 Trident II D5		(United States) USS Nevada, Pacific Ocean		(United States) US Navy	
1 March; 21:00		US Navy	Suborbital	Missile test	1 March	Successful
1 March; 21:00	Demonstration and Shakedown Operation 22 (DASO-22)					
2 March; 13:40	(United States) Juno		(United States) Fort Wingate LC-96		(United States) U.S. Army	
2 March; 13:40		U.S. Army	Suborbital	Target	2 March	Successful
2 March; 13:40	Target for MIM-104 Patriot PAC-3 MSE test, successfully intercepted					
9 March	(United States) Terrier-Oriole		(United States) Kauai		(United States) MDA	
9 March	(United States) ARAV-B	MDA	Suborbital	Radar target	9 March	Successful
9 March	Tracked by STSS satellites					
11 March	(India) Dhanush		(India) Sea launch from Indian Ocean		(India) DRDO	
11 March		DRDO	Suborbital	Target	11 March	Successful
11 March	Apogee: 100 kilometres (62 mi)					
11 March	(India) Prithvi II		(India) Integrated Test Range IC-3		(India) DRDO	
11 March		DRDO	Suborbital	Missile test	11 March	Successful
11 March	Apogee: 100 kilometres (62 mi)					
15 March	(Iran) Kavoshgar (Zelzal-based)		(Iran) Semnan Space Center		(Iran) ISA	
15 March	(Iran) Kavoshgar-4	ISA	Suborbital	Test flight	15 March	Successful
15 March	Test of biological capsule. Apogee: 120 kilometres (75 mi)					
16 March	(United States) Terrier-Oriole		(United States) Kauai		(United States) MDA	
16 March	(United States) ARAV-B	MDA	Suborbital	Radar target	16 March	Successful
16 March	Tracked by both STSS Demo satellites					
23 March; 18:50:00	(Canada) Black Brant IX		(United States) White Sands		(United States) NASA	
23 March; 18:50:00	(United States) EVE	CU Boulder	Suborbital	SDO calibration	23 March	Successful
29 March; 04:01	(Brazil) VSB-30		(Sweden) Esrange		EuroLaunch	
29 March; 04:01	(Germany) TEXUS-49	DLR/ESA	Suborbital	Microgravity	29 March	Successful
29 March; 04:01	Apogee: 268 kilometres (167 mi)					
15 April; 06:52	(United States) UGM-96 Trident I C4 (LV-2)	FTM-15	(Marshall Islands) Meck		(United States) MDA	
15 April; 06:52		MDA	Suborbital	ABM target	15 April	Successful
15 April; 07:03	(United States) RIM-161 Standard Missile 3	FTM-15	(United States) USS O'Kane, Pacific Ocean		(United States) US Navy	
15 April; 07:03	(United States) FTM-15	US Navy	Suborbital	ABM test	15 April	Successful
15 April; 07:03	First intercept of an IRBM by an SM-3 (FTM-15 Stellar Charon)					
26 April	(Russia) R-29RMU Sineva		(Russia) K-84 Ekaterinburg, Barents Sea		(Russia) VMF	
26 April		VMF	Suborbital	Missile test	26 April	Successful
27 April; 08:00:00	(Canada) Black Brant IX		(United States) Poker Flat		(United States) NASA	
27 April; 08:00:00	(United States)	WFF	Suborbital	Test flight	27 April	Successful
6 May; 23:02	(China) Tianying 3C		(China) Hainan		(China) CNSA	
6 May; 23:02	(China) Kunpeng-1	CSSAR	Suborbital	Environment monitoring	23:09	Successful
6 May; 23:02	Apogee: 196.6 kilometres (122.2 mi).					
11 May; 18:00	(United States) Improved Orion		(Brazil) Barreira do Inferno		(Brazil) AEB	
11 May; 18:00		INPE	Suborbital	Microgravity	11 May	Successful
20 May; 13:21	(United States) SpaceLoft XL		(United States) Spaceport America		(United States) UP Aerospace	
20 May; 13:21			Suborbital	Technology demonstration	20 May	Successful
20 May; 13:21	(United States) Goddard	Celestis	Suborbital	Space burial	20 May	Successful
20 May; 13:21	Apogee: 118.3 kilometres (73.5 mi), successfully recovered.					
20 May; 14:50	(Russia) R-29RMU2.1 Layner		(Russia) K-84 Ekaterinburg, Barents Sea		(Russia) VMF	
20 May; 14:50		VMF	Suborbital	Missile test	20 May	Successful
20 May; 14:50	Maiden flight of Layner missile					
10 June; 11:11:16	(United States) Terrier-Orion		(United States) Wallops Island		(United States) NASA	
10 June; 11:11:16	(United States) SubTec IV	GSFC	Suborbital	Technology demonstration	10 June	Successful
22 June; 13:35	(United States) LGM-30G Minuteman III		(United States) Vandenberg LF-10		(United States) U.S. Air Force	
22 June; 13:35		U.S. Air Force	Suborbital	Test flight	22 June	Successful
23 June; 10:18:00	(United States) Terrier-Orion		(United States) Wallops Island		(United States) NASA	
23 June; 10:18:00	(United States) RockOn	Colorado	Suborbital	Student experiments	23 June	Successful
28 June; 11:55	(Russia) RSM-56 Bulava		(Russia) K-535 Yuri Dolgorukiy, White Sea		(Russia) VMF	
28 June; 11:55		VMF	Suborbital	Missile test	28 June	Successful
28 June	(Iran) Shahab-1		Iran		(Iran) IRGC	
28 June		IGRC	Suborbital	Missile test	28 June	Successful
28 June	Part of an exercise with 14 missile launches, apogee: 100 kilometres (62 mi)					
28 June	(Iran) Shahab-1		Iran		(Iran) IGRC	
28 June		IRGC	Suborbital	Missile test	28 June	Successful
28 June	Part of an exercise with 14 missile launches, apogee: 100 kilometres (62 mi)					
28 June	(Iran) Shahab-2		Iran		(Iran) IRGC	
28 June		IRGC	Suborbital	Missile test	28 June	Successful
28 June	Part of an exercise with 14 missile launches, apogee: 100 kilometres (62 mi)					
28 June	(Iran) Shahab-2		Iran		(Iran) IRGC	
28 June		IRGC	Suborbital	Missile test	28 June	Successful
28 June	Part of an exercise with 14 missile launches, apogee: 100 kilometres (62 mi)					
28 June	(Iran) Ghadr-1		Iran		(Iran) IRGC	
28 June		IRGC	Suborbital	Missile test	28 June	Successful
28 June	Part of an exercise with 14 missile launches, apogee: 500 kilometres (310 mi)					
9 July; 02:04	(United States) SRALT		(United States) C-17, Pacific Ocean		(United States) MDA	
9 July; 02:04	(United States) FTX-17	MDA	Suborbital	Radar target	9 July	Successful
9 July; 02:04	Tracked by STSS Demo satellites					
9 July; 09:00:00	(Canada) Black Brant VB		(United States) Wallops LA-2		(United States) NASA	
9 July; 09:00:00	(United States) Daytime Dynamo	NASA	Suborbital	Geospace	9 July	Successful
9 July; 09:00:15	(United States) Terrier-Orion		(United States) Wallops LA-2		(United States) NASA	
9 July; 09:00:15	(United States) Daytime Dynamo	NASA	Suborbital	Geospace	9 July	Successful
11 July; 15:35	(Argentina) Gradicom II		(Argentina) Chamical		(Argentina) CITEFA	
11 July; 15:35		CITEFA	Suborbital	Test flight	11 July	Successful
11 July; 15:35	Apogee: 100 kilometres (62 mi)					
21 July; 07:00	(United States) Nike-Improved Orion		(Sweden) Esrange		EuroLaunch	
21 July; 07:00	(Sweden) PHOCUS	Stockholm/SSC	Suborbital	Atmospheric	21 July	Successful
21 July; 11:58:00	(United States) Terrier-Orion		(United States) Wallops Island		(United States) NASA	
21 July; 11:58:00	(United States) RockSat-X	Wallops Flight Facility	Suborbital	Student experiments	21 July	Successful
27 July; 10:01	(United States) LGM-30G Minuteman III		(United States) Vandenberg LF-04		(United States) U.S. Air Force	
27 July; 10:01		U.S. Air Force	Suborbital	Test flight	27 July	Launch failure
27 July; 10:01	An anomaly was detected five minutes after launch and the flight was terminated.					
27 July	(Russia) R-29RMU Sineva		(Russia) K-84 Ekaterinburg, Barents Sea		(Russia) VMF	
27 July		VMF	Suborbital	Missile test	27 July	Successful
11 August; 14:45	(United States) Minotaur IV Lite		(United States) Vandenberg SLC-8		(United States) Orbital	
11 August; 14:45	(United States) HTV-2b	U.S. Air Force	Suborbital	Technology demonstration	11 August	Spacecraft failure
11 August; 14:45	Second flight of the HTV-2, loss of contact approximately 20 minutes after launch at Mach 20.					
27 August; 03:20	(Russia) RSM-56 Bulava		(Russia) K-535 Yuri Dolgorukiy, White Sea		(Russia) VMF	
27 August; 03:20		VMF	Suborbital	Missile test	27 August	Successful
1 September; 13:53	(United States) Terrier-Oriole	FTM-16 E2	(United States) Kauai		(United States) MDA	
1 September; 13:53		MDA	Suborbital	ABM target	1 September	Successful
1 September; 13:53	SM-3 Block 1B target					
1 September; 13:54	(United States) RIM-161C SM-3 Block 1B	FTM-16 E2	(United States) USS Lake Erie, Pacific Ocean		(United States) US Navy	
1 September; 13:54		US Navy	Suborbital	ABM test	1 September	Spacecraft failure
1 September; 13:54	First launch of SM-3 Block 1B, intercept failed					
3 September; 09:46	(Russia) RS-12M Topol		(Russia) Plesetsk		(Russia) RVSN	
3 September; 09:46		RVSN	Suborbital	Missile test	3 September	Successful
15 September	(Iran) Kavoshgar (Zelzal-based)		(Iran) Semnan		(Iran) ISA	
15 September	(Iran) Kavoshgar-5	ISA	Suborbital	Biological	15 September	Launch failure
15 September	First Iranian attempt to launch a monkey into space; failed, resulting in death of the monkey					
26 September; 03:20	(India) Prithvi II		(India) Integrated Test Range IC-3		(India) DRDO	
26 September; 03:20		DRDO	Suborbital	Missile test	27 September	Successful
27 September; 07:08	(Russia) RS-26 Rubezh		(Russia) Plesetsk		(Russia) RVSN	
27 September; 07:08		RVSN	Suborbital	Missile test	27 September	Launch failure
29 September	(Russia) R-29RMU2.1 Layner		(Russia) K-114 Tula, Barents Sea		(Russia) VMF	
29 September		VMF	Suborbital	Missile test	30 September	Successful
30 September; 04:02	(India) Agni-II		(India) ITR IC-4		(India) Indian Army	
30 September; 04:02		Indian Army	Suborbital	Missile test	30 September	Successful
30 September; 04:02	Travelled 2,500 kilometres (1,600 mi) downrange					
5 October; 05:56	(United States) SRALT	FTT-12	(United States) C-17, Pacific Ocean		(United States) MDA	
5 October; 05:56		U.S. Army / MDA	Suborbital	ABM target	5 October	Successful
5 October; 05:56	Intercepted by THAAD missile					
5 October; 05:56	(Russia) R-17 Elbrus	FTT-12	(United States) MLP, Barking Sands		(United States) U.S. Army	
5 October; 05:56		U.S. Army / MDA	Suborbital	ABM target	5 October	Successful
5 October; 05:56	Intercepted by THAAD missile					
5 October; 06:00	(United States) THAAD	FTT-12	(United States) Barking Sands		(United States) U.S. Army	
5 October; 06:00		U.S. Army / MDA	Suborbital	ABM test	5 October	Successful
5 October; 06:00	Intercepted target missile					
5 October; 06:00	(United States) THAAD	FTT-12	(United States) Barking Sands		(United States) U.S. Army	
5 October; 06:00		U.S. Army / MDA	Suborbital	ABM test	5 October	Successful
5 October; 06:00	Intercepted target missile					
8 October; 10:25:01	(Canada) Black Brant IX		(United States) White Sands		(United States) NASA	
8 October; 10:25:01	(United States) PICTURE	Boston	Suborbital	Astronomy	8 October	Spacecraft failure
11 October; 21:15:00	(United States) Terrier-Orion		(Norway) Andøya		(United States) NASA	
11 October; 21:15:00	(United States) CHAMPS	Colorado	Suborbital	Geospace	11 October	Successful
13 October; 13:50:00	(United States) Terrier-Orion		(Norway) Andøya		(United States) NASA	
13 October; 13:50:00	(United States) CHAMPS	Colorado	Suborbital	Geospace	13 October	Successful
28 October; 03:40	(Russia) RSM-56 Bulava		(Russia) K-535 Yuri Dolgorukiy, White Sea		(Russia) VMF	
28 October; 03:40		VMF	Suborbital	Missile test	28 October	Successful
2 November; 07:50	(Israel) Jericho III		(Israel) Palmachim		(Israel) Israeli Air Force	
2 November; 07:50		Israeli Air Force	Suborbital	Missile test	2 November	Successful
3 November; 06:45	(Russia) RS-12M Topol		(Russia) Plesetsk		(Russia) RVSN	
3 November; 06:45		RVSN	Suborbital	Missile test	3 November	Successful
6 November; 07:00	(Canada) Black Brant IX		(United States) White Sands		(United States) NASA	
6 November; 07:00	XQC F5	Wisconsin	Suborbital	Astronomy	6 November	Successful
15 November; 03:30	(India) Agni IV		(India) Integrated Test Range IC-4		(India) DRDO	
15 November; 03:30		Indian Army	Suborbital	Missile test	15 November	Successful
17 November; 11:30	(United States) UGM-27 Polaris (STARS)		(United States) Barking Sands LC-42		(United States) U.S. Air Force	
17 November; 11:30	(United States) AHW Flight 1A	U.S. Army	Suborbital	Technology demonstration	17 November	Successful
25 November; 23:00	(United States) Improved Orion		(Brazil) Barreira do Inferno		(Brazil) AEB	
25 November; 23:00		INPE	Suborbital	Microgravity	25 November	Successful
27 November; 09:10	(Brazil) VSB-30		(Sweden) Esrange		EuroLaunch	
27 November; 09:10	(Germany) / TEXUS-48	DLR/ESA	Suborbital	Microgravity	27 November	Successful
2 December; 22:00	(Brazil) VS-30		(Brazil) Barreira do Inferno		(Brazil) AEB	
2 December; 22:00	(Brazil) Brasil-Alemanha	INPE	Suborbital	Microgravity	2 December	Successful
3 December; 07:21:31	(Brazil) VS-30/Improved Orion		(Norway) Ny-Ålesund		(Norway) Andøya	
3 December; 07:21:31	(Sweden) (Norway) ICI-3 (CanoRock 4)	Oslo/Andøya	Suborbital	Atmospheric	3 December	Successful
10 December; 10:30:00	(Canada) Black Brant IX		(United States) White Sands		(United States) NASA	
10 December; 10:30:00		Colorado	Suborbital	Astronomy	10 December	Successful
19 December; 14:48	(Japan) S-310		(Japan) Uchinoura		(Japan) JAXA	
19 December; 14:48		JAXA/TPU/TU	Suborbital	Ionospheric	19 December	Successful
19 December	(Russia) MN-300		(Russia) Kapustin Yar		(Russia) Roshydromet	
19 December	(Russia) MR-30	Roshydromet	Suborbital	Meteorology; Test flight	19 December	Successful
19 December	Maiden flight of MN-300					
23 December	(Russia) RSM-56 Bulava		(Russia) K-535 Yuri Dolgorukiy, White Sea		(Russia) VMF	
23 December		VMF	Suborbital	Missile test	23 December	Successful
23 December	(Russia) RSM-56 Bulava		(Russia) K-535 Yuri Dolgorukiy, White Sea		(Russia) VMF	
23 December		VMF	Suborbital	Missile test	23 December	Successful
27 December; 12:00	(Russia) RS-18 UR-100N		(Kazakhstan) Baikonur		(Russia) RVSN	
27 December; 12:00		RVSN	Suborbital	Missile test	27 December	Successful
?	(United States) UGM-133 Trident II D5		(United States) USS ?, Pacific Ocean		(United States) US Navy	
?		US Navy	Suborbital	Missile test	?	Successful
?	Follow-on Commander's Evaluation Test 44					
?	(United States) UGM-133 Trident II D5		(United States) USS ?, Pacific Ocean		(United States) US Navy	
?		US Navy	Suborbital	Missile test	?	Launch failure
?	Follow-on Commander's Evaluation Test 44 ?					

== Deep space rendezvous ==
Date (UTC)	Spacecraft	Event	Remarks
9 January	Mars Express	Flyby of Phobos	Closest approach: 100 kilometres (62 mi). Mars Express made a total of 8 flybys of Phobos at a distance of less than 1,400 kilometres (870 mi) between 20 December and 16 January.
9 January	Artemis P1	Spacecraft left LL2 orbit and joined Artemis P2 in LL1 orbit	
11 January	Cassini	3rd flyby of Rhea	Closest approach: 76 kilometres (47 mi)
15 February	Stardust (NExT)	Flyby of Tempel 1	Closest approach: 181 kilometres (112 mi). Observed changes since Deep Impact flyby and imaged crater created by Deep Impact impactor, as well as new terrain.
18 February	Cassini	74th flyby of Titan	Closest approach: 3,651 kilometres (2,269 mi)
18 March	MESSENGER	Hermocentric orbit injection	First artificial satellite of Mercury; elliptical orbit with a periapsis of 200 kilometers (120 mi) and an apoapsis of 15,000 km (9,300 mi).
19 April	Cassini	75th flyby of Titan	Closest approach: 10,053 kilometres (6,247 mi)
8 May	Cassini	76th flyby of Titan	Closest approach: 1,873 kilometres (1,164 mi)
8 June	Chang'e 2	Departed lunar orbit	Travelled to L2 Lagrangian point, which it reached in August 2011.
20 June	Cassini	77th flyby of Titan	Closest approach: 1,359 kilometres (844 mi)
27 June	Artemis P1	Lunar orbit insertion	Initial orbital parameters were: apogee 3,543 kilometres (2,202 mi), perigee 27,000 kilometres (17,000 mi). Over the following three months, the orbit was lowered to an apogee of 97 kilometres (60 mi) and a perigee of 18,000 kilometres (11,000 mi), with an inclination of 20 degrees; retrograde orbit.
16 July	Dawn	Vestiocentric orbit injection	First artificial satellite of 4 Vesta. Initial orbit was 16,000 kilometres (9,900 mi) high and was reduced to 2,700 kilometres (1,700 mi) until 11 August.
17 July	Artemis P2	Lunar orbit insertion	Initial orbital parameters were similar to Artemis P1. Over the following three months the orbit was lowered to an apogee of 97 kilometres (60 mi) and a perigee of 18,000 kilometres (11,000 mi), with an inclination of 20 degrees; prograde orbit.
25 August	Cassini	Second-closest flyby of Hyperion	Closest approach: 25,000 kilometres (16,000 mi)
12 September	Cassini	78th flyby of Titan	Closest approach: 5,821 kilometres (3,617 mi)
16 September	Cassini	Flyby of Hyperion	Closest approach: 58,000 kilometres (36,000 mi)
1 October	Cassini	14th flyby of Enceladus	Closest approach: 99 kilometres (62 mi)
19 October	Cassini	15th flyby of Enceladus	Closest approach: 1,231 kilometres (765 mi)
6 November	Cassini	16th flyby of Enceladus	Closest approach: 496 kilometres (308 mi)
12 December	Cassini	3rd flyby of Dione	Closest approach: 99 kilometres (62 mi)
13 December	Cassini	79th flyby of Titan	Closest approach: 3,586 kilometres (2,228 mi)
31 December	GRAIL-A	Lunar orbit insertion	Twin satellite Grail-B's insertion occurred a day later, on 1 January 2012.

== EVAs ==
Start date/time	Duration	End time	Spacecraft	Crew	Remarks
21 January; 10:05	5 hours 23 minutes	15:49	Expedition 26; ISS Pirs	(Russia) Dmitri Kondratyev (Russia) Oleg Skripochka	Prepared the ISS Poisk module for future dockings.
16 February; 13:15	6 hours 23 minutes	18:15	Expedition 26; ISS Pirs	(Russia) Dmitri Kondratyev (Russia) Oleg Skripochka	Installed a radio antenna, deployed a nanosatellite, installed two experiments and retrieved two exposure panels on a third experiment.
28 February; 15:46	6 hours 34 minutes	22:20	STS-133; ISS Quest	(United States) Stephen Bowen (United States) Alvin Drew	Removed a failed coolant pump and routed a power extension cable.
2 March; 15:41	6 hours 14 minutes	21:55	STS-133; ISS Quest	(United States) Stephen Bowen (United States) Alvin Drew	Removed or repaired thermal insulation, swapped out an attachment bracket on the Columbus module, installed a camera assembly on Dextre and installed a light on a cargo cart.
20 May; 07:10	6 hours 19 minutes	13:29	STS-134; ISS Quest	(United States) Andrew Feustel (United States) Gregory Chamitoff	Completed installation of a new set of MISSE experiments, started installing a new wireless video system, installed an ammonia jumper, a new light on the CETA cart on the S3 truss segment, and a cover on the starboard SARJ.
22 May; 06:05	8 hours 07 minutes	14:12	STS-134; ISS Quest	(United States) Andrew Feustel (United States) Michael Fincke	Hooked up a jumper to transfer ammonia to the Port 6 PVTCS, lubricated the SARJ and one of the "hands" on Dextre, and installed a stowage beam on the S1 truss.
25 May; 05:43	6 hours 54 minutes	12:37	STS-134; ISS Quest	(United States) Andrew Feustel (United States) Michael Fincke	Installed PDGF (except for data cable), routed power cables from Unity to Zarya, finished installation of wireless video system, took pictures of Zarya's thrusters and captured infrared video of an experiment in ELC 3.
27 May; 04:15	7 hours 24 minutes	11:39	STS-134; ISS Quest	(United States) Gregory Chamitoff (United States) Mike Fincke	Installed OBSS on S1 truss, removed the EFGF and replaced it with a spare PDGF, and released some torque on the bolts that were holding the spare arm for Dextre down against ELC 3. Final shuttle spacewalk.
12 July; 13:22	6 hours 31 minutes	19:53	Expedition 28; ISS Quest	(United States) Ronald Garan (United States) Michael Fossum	Moved a failed cooling pump from the station to the shuttle Atlantis, transferred a robotic refuelling apparatus from the shuttle to the ISS, installed a materials science experiment on the station's truss, serviced a robot arm attachment fitting, installed a thermal cover over the unused docking port PMA-3, and fixed a protruding wire on a grapple fixture on the Zarya module.
3 August; 14:51	6 hours 22 minutes	21:22	Expedition 28; ISS Pirs	(Russia) Sergei Volkov (Russia) Aleksandr Samokutyayev	Launched Kedr satellite, installed BIORISK experiment outside Pirs, and installed laser communication equipment to transmit scientific data from the Russian Orbital Segment.

== Orbital launch statistics ==
=== By country ===
For the purposes of this section, the yearly tally of orbital launches by country assigns each flight to the country of origin of the rocket, not to the launch services provider or the spaceport. For example, Soyuz launches by Arianespace in Kourou are counted under Russia because Soyuz-2 is a Russian rocket.

Country	Launches	Successes	Failures	Partial failures
China	19	18	1	0
France	5	5	0	0
India	3	3	0	0
Iran	1	1	0	0
Japan	3	3	0	0
Russia	29 (Note: Includes two European Soyuz launches from Kourou, French Guiana by Arianespace. Fobos-Grunt launched successfully, but failed while on its parking orbit.)	25	4	0
Ukraine	6 (Note: Includes one Zenit from Sea Launch and one from Land Launch.)	6	0	0
United States	18	17	1	0
World	84	78	6	0

=== By rocket ===
- Ariane 5
- Atlas V
- Delta II
- Delta IV
- Delta IV Heavy
- H-IIA
- H-IIB
- Long March 2
- Long March 3
- Long March 4
- Minotaur I
- Minotaur IV
- Taurus
- PSLV
- Soyuz-U
- Soyuz-FG
- Soyuz-2 (Russia)
- Soyuz ST (Europe)
- Space Shuttle
- Proton-K
- Proton-M
- Rokot
- Zenit-2M
- Zenit-3F
- Zenit-3SL/SLB
- Others

==== By family ====
Family	Country	Launches	Successes	Failures	Partial failures	Remarks
Ariane	France	5	5	0	0	
Atlas	United States	5	5	0	0	
Delta	United States	6	6	0	0	
H-II	Japan	3	3	0	0	
Long March	China	19	18	1	0	
Minotaur	United States	4	3	1	0	
PSLV	India	3	3	0	0	
R-7	Russia	19	17	2	0	
R-36	Ukraine	1	1	0	0	
Safir	Iran	1	1	0	0	
Space Shuttle	United States	3	3	0	0	Final flight
Universal Rocket	Russia	10	8	2	0	
Zenit	Ukraine	5	5	0	0	

==== By type ====
Rocket	Country	Family	Launches	Successes	Failures	Partial failures	Remarks
Ariane 5	France	Ariane	5	5	0	0	
Atlas V	United States	Atlas	5	5	0	0	
Delta II	United States	Delta	3	3	0	0	
Delta IV	United States	Delta	3	3	0	0	
Dnepr	Ukraine	R-36	1	1	0	0	
H-IIA	Japan	H-II	2	2	0	0	
H-IIB	Japan	H-II	1	1	0	0	
Long March 2	China	Long March	7	6	1	0	
Long March 3	China	Long March	9	9	0	0	
Long March 4	China	Long March	3	3	0	0	
Minotaur I	United States	Minotaur	2	2	0	0	
Minotaur IV	United States	Minotaur	1	1	0	0	
PSLV	India	PSLV	3	3	0	0	
Proton	Russia	Universal Rocket	9	8	1	0	
Safir	Iran	Safir	1	1	0	0	
Soyuz	Russia	R-7	10	9	1	0	
Soyuz-2	Russia	R-7	9	8	1	0	
Space Shuttle	United States	Space Shuttle	3	3	0	0	Final flight
UR-100	Russia	Universal Rocket	1	0	1	0	
Taurus	United States	Minotaur	1	0	1	0	
Zenit	Ukraine	Zenit	5	5	0	0	

==== By configuration ====
Rocket	Country	Type	Launches	Successes	Failures	Partial failures	Remarks
Ariane 5 ECA	France	Ariane 5	4	4	0	0	
Ariane 5 ES	France	Ariane 5	1	1	0	0	
Atlas V 401	United States	Atlas V	1	1	0	0	
Atlas V 411	United States	Atlas V	1	1	0	0	
Atlas V 501	United States	Atlas V	1	1	0	0	
Atlas V 541	United States	Atlas V	1	1	0	0	
Atlas V 551	United States	Atlas V	1	1	0	0	
Delta II 7320	United States	Delta II	1	1	0	0	
Delta II 7920	United States	Delta II	1	1	0	0	
Delta II 7920H	United States	Delta II	1	1	0	0	Final flight
Delta IV Medium+ (4,2)	United States	Delta IV	2	2	0	0	
Delta IV Heavy	United States	Delta IV	1	1	0	0	
Dnepr	Ukraine	Dnepr	1	1	0	0	
H-IIA 202	Japan	H-IIA	2	2	0	0	
H-IIB	Japan	H-IIB	1	1	0	0	
Long March 2C	China	Long March 2	4	3	1	0	
Long March 2D	China	Long March 2	1	1	0	0	
Long March 2F	China	Long March 2	1	1	0	0	
Long March 2F/G	China	Long March 2	1	1	0	0	Maiden flight
Long March 3A	China	Long March 3	3	3	0	0	
Long March 3B	China	Long March 3	5	5	0	0	
Long March 3C	China	Long March 3	1	1	0	0	
Long March 4B	China	Long March 4	3	3	0	0	
Minotaur I	United States	Minotaur I	2	2	0	0	
Minotaur IV+	United States	Minotaur IV	1	1	0	0	
PSLV-G	India	PSLV	1	1	0	0	
PSLV-CA	India	PSLV	1	1	0	0	
PSLV-XL	India	PSLV	1	1	0	0	
Proton-M / Briz-M	Russia	Proton	9	8	1	0	
Rokot / Briz-KM	Russia	UR-100	1	0	1	0	
Safir-B	Iran	Safir	1	1	0	0	
Soyuz-2.1a / Fregat-M	Russia	Soyuz-2	3	3	0	0	
Soyuz ST-A / Fregat	Russia	Soyuz-2	1	1	0	0	
Soyuz-2.1b / Fregat-M	Russia	Soyuz-2	4	3	1	0	
Soyuz ST-B / Fregat-MT	Russia	Soyuz-2	1	1	0	0	
Soyuz-FG	Russia	Soyuz	4	4	0	0	
Soyuz-U	Russia	Soyuz	6	5	1	0	
Space Shuttle	United States	Space Shuttle	3	3	0	0	Final flight
Taurus-XL	United States	Taurus	1	0	1	0	
Zenit-2M	Ukraine	Zenit	1	1	0	0	
Zenit-3F	Ukraine	Zenit	2	2	0	0	Maiden flight
Zenit-3SL	Ukraine	Zenit	1	1	0	0	
Zenit-3SLB	Ukraine	Zenit	1	1	0	0	

=== By spaceport ===
- Jiuquan
- Taiyuan
- Xichang
- Kourou
- Satish Dhawan
- Ocean Odyssey
- Semnan
- Tanegashima
- Baikonur
- Dombarovsky
- Plesetsk
- Cape Canaveral
- Kennedy
- Kodiak
- MARS
- Vandenberg

Site	Country	Launches	Successes	Failures	Partial failures	Remarks
Baikonur	Kazakhstan	25	23	2	0	
Cape Canaveral	United States	7	7	0	0	
Dombarovsky	Russia	1	1	0	0	
Kourou	France	7	7	0	0	
Jiuquan	China	6	5	1	0	
Kennedy Space Center	United States	3	3	0	0	
Kodiak	United States	1	1	0	0	
MARS	United States	1	1	0	0	
Ocean Odyssey	(United Nations) International waters	1	1	0	0	
Plesetsk	Russia	6	4	2	0	
Satish Dhawan	India	3	3	0	0	
Semnan	Iran	1	1	0	0	
Tanegashima	Japan	3	3	0	0	
Taiyuan	China	4	4	0	0	
Vandenberg	United States	6	5	1	0	
Xichang	China	9	9	0	0	
Total		84	78	6	0	

=== By orbit ===
- Transatmospheric
- Low Earth
- Low Earth (ISS)
- Low Earth (SSO)
- Low Earth (retrograde)
- Medium Earth
- Geosychronous
  (transfer)
- Inclined GSO
- High Earth
- Heliocentric

Orbital regime	Launches	Successes	Failures	Accidentally achieved	Remarks
Transatmospheric	0	0	0	0	
Low Earth	44	40	4	0	14 to ISS, 1 to Tiangong-1
Medium Earth / Molniya	8	7	1	0	
Geosynchronous / GTO	27	26	1	1	
High Earth / Lunar transfer	3	3	0	0	
Heliocentric / Planetary transfer	2	2	0	0	
Total	84	78	6	1	

== See also ==
- 2011 in science
- List of human spaceflights, 2011–2020
- Timeline of spaceflight
