= Dynamic Ionosphere CubeSat Experiment =

Cubesats studying space weather

The Dynamic Ionosphere CubeSat Experiment (DICE) is a scientific mission consisting of two Miniaturized Satellites DICE-1 and DICE-2 flying in formation. The satellites are an unusual 1.5U variant of the CubeSat design for microsatellites. Both satellites were launched from Vandenberg Air Force Base in October 2011 atop a Delta II rocket. This was a multi-payload mission with four other CubeSats, AubieSat-1, M-Cubed, Explorer-1_Prime and RAX-2.

The satellites are intended to map changes in the Earth's Plasmasphere caused by Geomagnetic storms.

On board control is provided by a Pumpkin FM430 flight control module containing a Texas Instruments MPS430 microcontroller. Communications are provided by a half-duplex UHF modem with a 1.5 Mbit/s downlink (465 MHz) and 19.2 kbit/s uplink (450 MHz). The satellites carry four Electric Field Probe sensors on telescopic booms, two DC Langmuir probes for detection of ions and a three-axis magnetometer for measuring magnetic fields.
