= KySat-1 =

American satellite

- Mission type: Technology
- Operator: Kentucky Space
- Mission duration: 18-24 months (planned); Failed to orbit

Spacecraft properties
- Spacecraft: CubeSat
- Spacecraft type: 1U CubeSat
- Manufacturer: Kentucky Space
- Launch mass: 1 kg (2.2 lb)
- Dimensions: 10 cm × 10 cm × 10 cm (3.9 in × 3.9 in × 3.9 in)
- Power: Solar cells and batteries

Start of mission
- Launch date: 4 March 2011, 10:09:43 UTC
- Rocket: Taurus-XL 3110
- Launch site: Vandenberg, LC-576E
- Contractor: Orbital Sciences Corporation
- Entered service: Failed to orbit

Orbital parameters
- Reference system: Geocentric orbit (planned)
- Regime: Low Earth orbit

KySat-1 was an American satellite which was to have been operated by Kentucky Space. Designed to operate for eighteen to twenty four months, it was lost in a launch failure in March 2011 after the Taurus launch vehicle carrying it failed to achieve orbit.

== Spacecraft description ==
KySat-1 was a single-unit CubeSat picosatellite which was built as part of a programme to involve and interest schoolchildren in spaceflight. Children would have been given access to the satellite; uploading and downloading data and using a camera aboard the spacecraft to produce images of the Earth. The satellite also carried a secondary technology demonstration payload; investigating the use of S-band communication at high bandwidths.

== Launch ==
KySat-1 was launched by Orbital Sciences Corporation using a Taurus-XL 3110 launch vehicle flying from Launch Complex 576E at the Vandenberg Air Force Base in California. It was a secondary payload on the launch, with the primary payload being the NASA Glory spacecraft. Hermes and Explorer-1 Prime were launched aboard the same rocket. The launch took place at 10:09:43 UTC on 4 March 2011, and ended in failure after the payload fairing failed to separate from around the spacecraft just under three minutes after launch. With the fairing still attached, the launch vehicle had too much mass to achieve orbit, and reentered over the southern Pacific Ocean or the Antarctic. It was the second consecutive failure of a Taurus launch vehicle, following the loss of the Orbiting Carbon Observatory in 2009.
