= Kentucky Space Grant Consortium =

Non-profit organizations based in Kentucky

The Kentucky Space Grant Consortium (KSGC) is a partnership between Kentucky and NASA. Projects include the University of Kentucky's Big Blue, Kentucky Space, and Northern Kentucky University's Moon Buggy Project.

== See also ==
- National Space Grant College and Fellowship Program
