= AubieSat-1 =

American university CubeSat

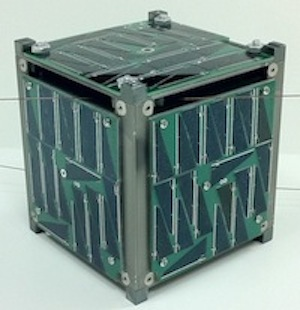
- AubieSat-1
- Mission type: Technology
- Operator: Auburn University
- COSPAR ID: 2011-061E
- SATCAT no.: 37854

Spacecraft properties
- Manufacturer: Auburn University

Start of mission
- Launch date: October 28, 2011, 09:48:02 UTC
- Rocket: Delta II 7920-10C
- Launch site: Vandenberg SLC-2W
- Contractor: United Launch Alliance

Orbital parameters
- Reference system: Geocentric
- Regime: Low Earth
- Perigee altitude: 452 kilometers (281 mi)
- Apogee altitude: 750 kilometers (470 mi)
- Inclination: 101.71 degrees
- Period: 96.58 minutes
- Epoch: July 6, 2014, 01:17:55 UTC

AubieSat-1 (OSCAR-71) is a CubeSat designed, built, and tested by undergraduate students at Auburn University. It was launched from Vandenberg Air Force Base October 28, 2011 atop a Delta II rocket. This was a multi-payload mission with five other CubeSats, M-Cubed, DICE-1, DICE-2, Explorer-1_Prime and RAX-2.

== Purpose ==
The purpose of AubieSat-1 was to accomplish several things:

- Establish Auburn University as a university capable of developing satellites.
- Provide workforce applicable experience for students.
- Study and compare the effects of solar cell coatings.
- Demonstrate a system bus that could be used at the baseline design for additional satellites later developed by the program.

== Launch ==
The satellite was launched on 28 October 2011 with a Delta-II rocket at the Vandenberg Air Force Base. Because the satellite communicates in the amateur radio frequency range, it was assigned the OSCAR number 71 after its successful launch.

Initially, communication problems arose after launch, apparently because one of the satellite's antennas failed to deploy. This issue was resolved by using a more powerful transmitter at the ground station. Aubiesat-1 transmitted solar cell voltage readings for several months.

The satellite transmitted telemetry data in Morse code on the 437.475 MHz frequency as an amateur radio satellite, using the call sign KI4NQO. Its COSPAR designation is 2011-061E.
