= Magnetorquer =

Satellite system

A magnetorquer or magnetic torquer (also known as a torque rod) is a satellite system for attitude control, detumbling, and stabilization built from electromagnetic coils. The magnetorquer creates a magnetic dipole that interfaces with an ambient magnetic field, usually Earth's, so that the counter-forces produced provide useful torque.

== Functional principle ==
Magnetorquers are sets of electromagnets arranged to yield a rotationally asymmetric (anisotropic) magnetic field over an extended area. That field is controlled by switching current flow through the coils on or off, usually under computerized feedback control. The magnets themselves are mechanically anchored to the craft, so that any magnetic force they exert on the surrounding magnetic field will lead to a magnetic reverse force and result in mechanical torque about the vessel's center of gravity. This makes it possible to freely pivot the craft around in a known local gradient of the magnetic field by only using electrical energy.

The magnetic dipole generated by the magnetorquer is expressed by the formula

$$\mathbf{m} = n I \mathbf{A},$$

where n is the number of turns of the wire, I is the current provided, and A is the vector area of the coil. The dipole interacts with the magnetic field generating a torque

$$\boldsymbol{\tau} = \mathbf{m} \times \mathbf{B},$$

where m is the magnetic dipole vector, B the magnetic field vector (for a spacecraft it is the Earth magnetic field vector), and τ is the generated torque vector.

== Construction ==
The construction of a magnetorquer is based on the realization of a coil with a defined area and number of turns according to the required performances. However, there are different ways to obtain the coil; thus, depending on the construction strategy, it is possible to find three types of magnetorquer, apparently very different from each other but based on the same concept:

Air-core magnetorquer
This comprises the basic concept of magnetorquer, a conductive wire wrapped around a non-conductive support anchored to the satellite. This kind of magnetorquer can provide a consistent magnetic dipole with an acceptable mass and encumbrance.
Embedded coil
This is constructed creating a spiral trace inside the PCBs of solar panels which generates the effect of the coil. This solution is the one with the least impact on the satellite as it is entirely contained within the solar panels. However, due to the physical limit in the board thickness and the presence of other circuits and electronic components, it is not possible to reach a high value of the magnetic dipole.

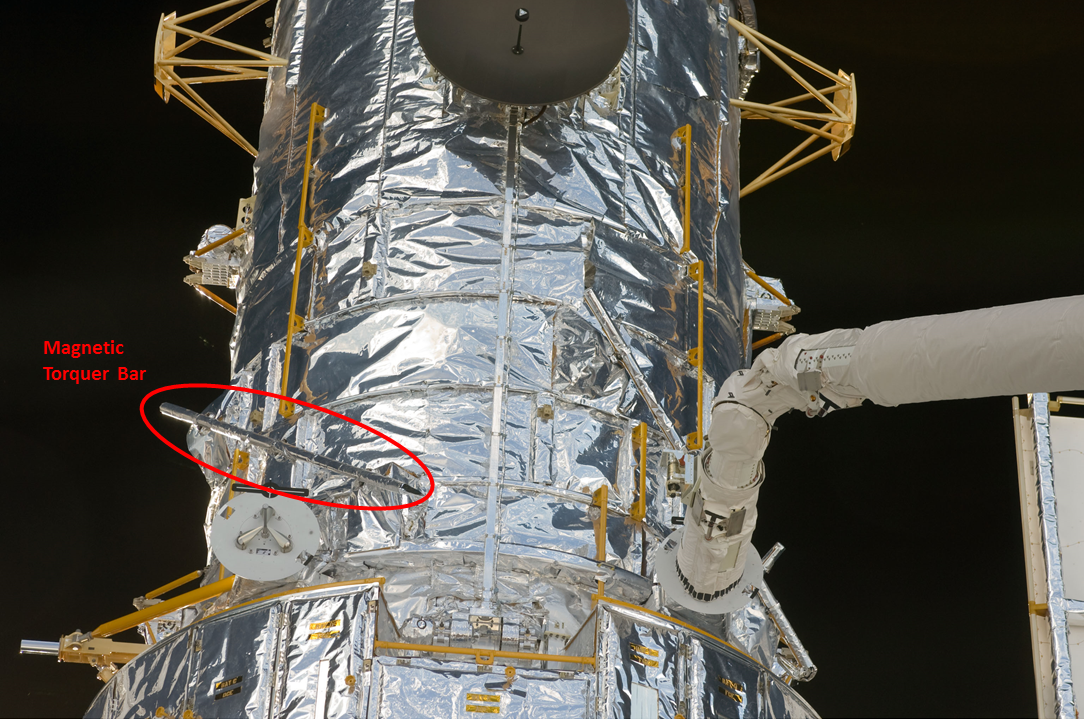
The Hubble Space Telescope uses four 8 feet (2.4 m) iron torque rods as part of its pointing control system.

Torque rod
This is the most efficient solution. A conductive wire is wrapped around a ferromagnetic core which is magnetized when excited by the coil, thus generating a dipole considerably higher than the other solutions. However, the disadvantage is the presence of a residual magnetic dipole that remains even when the coil is turned off because of the hysteresis in the magnetization curve of the core. It is therefore necessary to demagnetize the core with a proper demagnetizing procedure. Normally, the presence of the core (generally consisting of heavy metal) increases the mass of the system.

Typically three coils are used, although reduced configurations of two or even one magnet can suffice where full attitude control is not needed or external forces like asymmetric drag allow underactuated control. The three coil assembly usually takes the form of three perpendicular coils, because this setup equalizes the rotational symmetry of the fields which can be generated; no matter how the external field and the craft are placed with respect to each other, approximately the same torque can always be generated simply by using different amounts of current on the three different coils.

As long as current is passing through the coils and the spacecraft has not yet been stabilized in a fixed orientation with respect to the external field, the craft's spinning will continue.

== Advantages ==
Magnetorquers are lightweight, reliable, and energy-efficient. Unlike thrusters, they do not require expendable propellant, so they could in theory work indefinitely as long as sufficient power is available to match the resistive load of the coils. In Earth orbit, sunlight is one such practically inexhaustible energy source, using solar panels.

Another advantage over momentum wheels and control moment gyroscopes is the absence of moving parts, hence significantly higher reliability.

== Disadvantages ==
The main disadvantage of magnetorquers is that very high magnetic flux densities are needed if large craft have to be turned quickly. This either necessitates a very high current in the coils, or much higher ambient flux densities than are available in Earth orbit. Consequently, the torques provided are very limited and only serve to accelerate or decelerate the change in a spacecraft's attitude by small amounts. Over time, active control can produce fast spinning even on Earth, but for accurate attitude control and stabilization the torques provided are often insufficient. To overcome this, magnetorquer are often combined with reaction wheels.

A broader disadvantage is the dependence on Earth's magnetic field strength, making this approach unsuitable for deep space missions, and also more suitable for low Earth orbits as opposed to higher ones such as geosynchronous. The dependence on the highly variable intensity of Earth's magnetic field is problematic because then the attitude control problem becomes highly nonlinear. It is also impossible to control attitude in all three axes even if the full three coils are used, because the torque can be generated only perpendicular to the Earth's magnetic field vector.

Any spinning satellite made of a conductive material will lose rotational momentum in Earth's magnetic field due to generation of eddy currents in its body and the corresponding braking force proportional to its spin rate. Aerodynamic friction losses can also play a part. This means that the magnetorquer will have to be continuously operated, and at a power level which is enough to counter the resistive forces present. This is not always possible within the energy constraints of the vessel.

The Michigan Exploration Laboratory (MXL) suspects that the M-Cubed CubeSat, a joint project run by MXL and JPL, became magnetically conjoined to Explorer-1 Prime, a second CubeSat released at the same time, via strong onboard magnets used for passive attitude control, after deploying on October 28, 2011. This is the first non-destructive latching of two satellites.

== See also ==
- Gravity-gradient stabilization, a passive stabilization technique
