= M-Cubed =

Satellite

- Mission type: Technology/Education
- Operator: University of Michigan
- COSPAR ID: 2011-061F
- SATCAT no.: 37855
- Mission duration: 13 years, 6 months and 16 days (elapsed)

Spacecraft properties
- Spacecraft type: CubeSat

Start of mission
- Launch date: 28 October 2011
- Rocket: Delta II 7920-10C
- Launch site: Vandenberg, SLC-2W

Orbital parameters
- Reference system: Geocentric orbit
- Regime: Low Earth orbit
- Eccentricity: 0.0215612
- Inclination: 101.7178°
- RAAN: 229.4521°
- Argument of perigee: 355.7858°
- Mean anomaly: 120.6105°
- Mean motion: 14.90323087 orbits/day
- Epoch: 7 July 2014

M-Cubed is a miniaturized satellite built by students at the University of Michigan in a joint project run by the Michigan Exploration Laboratory (MXL) and Jet Propulsion Laboratory (JPL). It is an example of the popular CubeSat design for amateur satellites. It was launched from Vandenberg Air Force Base on 28 October 2011 atop a Delta II rocket. M-Cubed was launched as a secondary payload to the Suomi NPP satellite, along with AubieSat-1, DICE-1, DICE-2, Explorer-1 Prime and RAX-2.

M-Cubed, short for Michigan Multipurpose Minisat, was designed as a technology demonstrator for a new FPGA-based image processing system intended for a future NASA mission, Plankton, Aerosol, Cloud, ocean Ecosystem (PACE), recommended by the Earth Science Decadal Survey. The mission was also intended to validate the satellite bus design for use in future CubeSat missions. The satellite uses a passive magnetorquer for attitude control, consisting of a large permanent magnet that aligns the satellite with the Earth's magnetic field. On-board control is provided by a Taskit Stamp9G20 microcontroller running RTLinux.

Following the launch, MXL was unable to command M-Cubed and observed anomalies in its transmitted data. MXL concluded that the M-Cubed CubeSat became magnetically conjoined to Explorer-1 [Prime], a second CubeSat released at the same time, via both satellites' attitude control magnets. This is the first recorded instance of two satellites unintentionally and non-destructively latching together. As a result of this incident, M-Cubed was unable to complete its mission.

The M-Cubed mission was successfully re-flown as MCubed-2, launched on 6 December 2013.
