= Hermes (satellite) =

Lost American 1U CubeSat

- Mission type: Technology
- Operator: COSGC
- Mission duration: Failed to orbit

Spacecraft properties
- Spacecraft type: 1U CubeSat
- Launch mass: 1 kilogram (2.2 lb)

Start of mission
- Launch date: 4 March 2011, 10:09:43 UTC
- Rocket: Taurus-XL 3110 T9
- Launch site: Vandenberg LC-576E
- Contractor: Orbital

Orbital parameters
- Reference system: Geocentric
- Regime: Low Earth

Hermes was an American satellite which was to have been operated by the Colorado Space Grant Consortium. Intended to perform technology demonstration experiments in low Earth orbit, it was lost during launch in March 2011 when the rocket that was carrying it failed to achieve orbit.

Hermes was a single-unit CubeSat picosatellite which was primarily designed to test communications systems for future satellites. It was intended to test a new system which would allow data to be transferred at a higher rate than on previous satellites, thereby enabling future missions to return more data from scientific experiments or images. A secondary objective was to have seen tests performed upon the satellite bus, which was to have served as the basis for future COSGC missions. The satellite would also have returned data on the temperature and magnetic field of its surroundings.

Hermes was launched by Orbital Sciences Corporation using a Taurus-XL 3110 carrier rocket flying from Launch Complex 576E at the Vandenberg Air Force Base in California. It was a secondary payload on the launch, with the primary payload being the NASA Glory spacecraft. The KySat-1 and Explorer-1 [Prime] satellites were launched aboard the same rocket. The launch took place at 10:09:43 UTC on 4 March 2011, and ended in failure after the payload fairing failed to separate from around the spacecraft just under three minutes after launch. With the fairing still attached the rocket had too much mass to achieve orbit, and reentered over the southern Pacific Ocean or the Antarctic. It was the second consecutive failure of a Taurus rocket, following the loss of the Orbiting Carbon Observatory in 2009.
