= PSSC-2 =

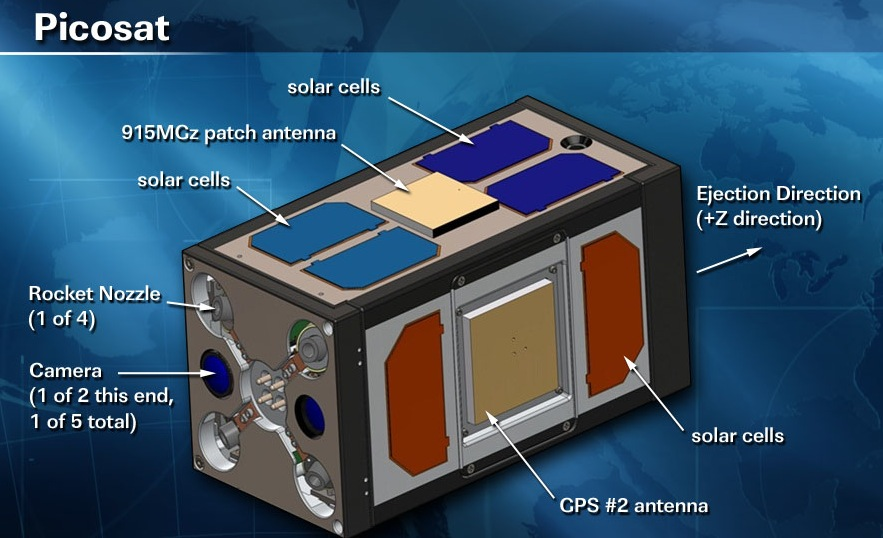
- Diagram of PSSC-2
- Mission type: Technology
- Operator: US Air Force
- COSPAR ID: 2011-031B
- SATCAT no.: 37752

Spacecraft properties
- Manufacturer: Aerospace Corporation
- Launch mass: 3.7 kilograms (8.2 lb)

Start of mission
- Launch date: 8 July 2011, 15:29 UTC
- Rocket: Space Shuttle Atlantis STS-135
- Launch site: Kennedy LC-39A

End of mission
- Decay date: 8 December 2011

Orbital parameters
- Reference system: Geocentric
- Regime: Low Earth

PSSC-2, or Pico-Satellite Solar Cell Testbed 2, also known as PSSC-Testbed 2, is a miniaturised satellite which was operated by the United States Air Force as part of a technology demonstration programme. It was the last satellite to be deployed from a Space Shuttle.

== Overview ==
PSSC-2 was launched aboard Space Shuttle Atlantis on its final mission, STS-135. The launch took place from Launch Complex 39A at the Kennedy Space Center, at 15:29 UTC on 8 July 2011. PSSC-2, along with a deployment mechanism, was carried to orbit in the payload bay of the Shuttle, attached to the right wall behind the Orbiter Docking System. It remained attached during Atlantis' visit to the International Space Station, and was originally scheduled to be deployed at 07:11 UTC on 19 July, the day after undocking. With the extension of the STS-135 mission, undocking, and hence deployment, was delayed by one day.

Animated view of the PSSC-2 deploy, the final object deployed by the Space Shuttle Program.

PSSC-2 is the second PSSC satellite, following PSSC-1 which was deployed from Space Shuttle Endeavour during STS-126 in 2008. It carries two technology demonstration experiments: Miniature Tracking Vehicle (MTV), and the Compact Total Electron Content Sensor (CTECS). MTV will test the satellite's ability to function as a reference body for tracking stations, whilst CTECS will observe the signals from occulting Global Positioning System satellites in order to study the density of the ionosphere. The satellite also carries cameras intended to capture the last images of a Space Shuttle in orbit, shortly after separation.

PSSC-2 is a 3.7-kilogram (8.2 lb) spacecraft which was built by the Aerospace Corporation, and is equipped with three-axis stabilisation, adaptive communications systems, and systems to monitor the energy produced by its solar cells. Four ammonium perchlorate solid rocket motors, each capable of generating 40 newtons (9.0 lb_{f}) of thrust, will be used for manoeuvring one month after launch; either to raise the satellite's orbit or to deorbit it.

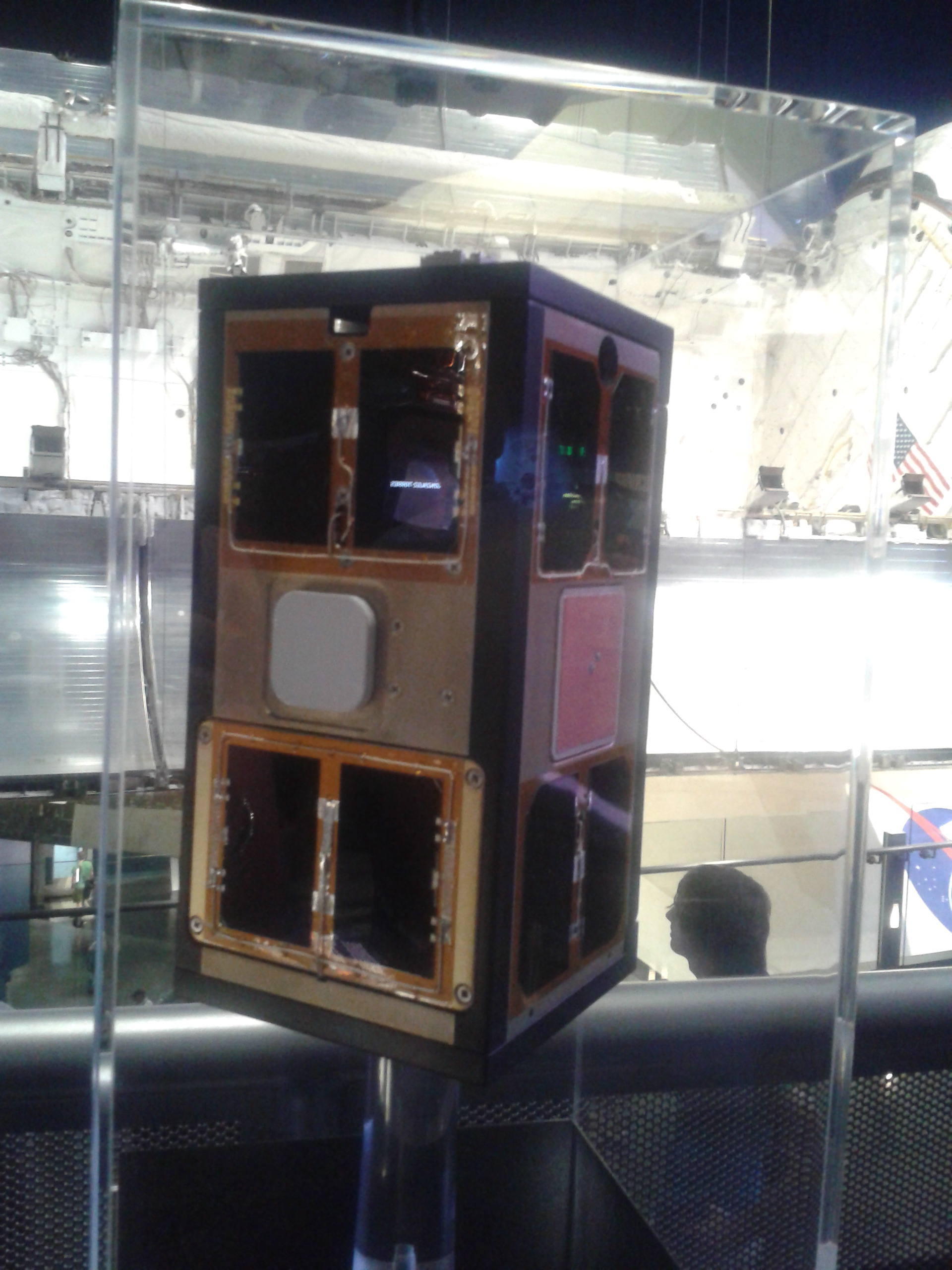
Replica of the PSSC-2 Picosat at the Kennedy Space Center
