= RAX-2 =

CubeSat satellite

Radio Aurora Explorer 2
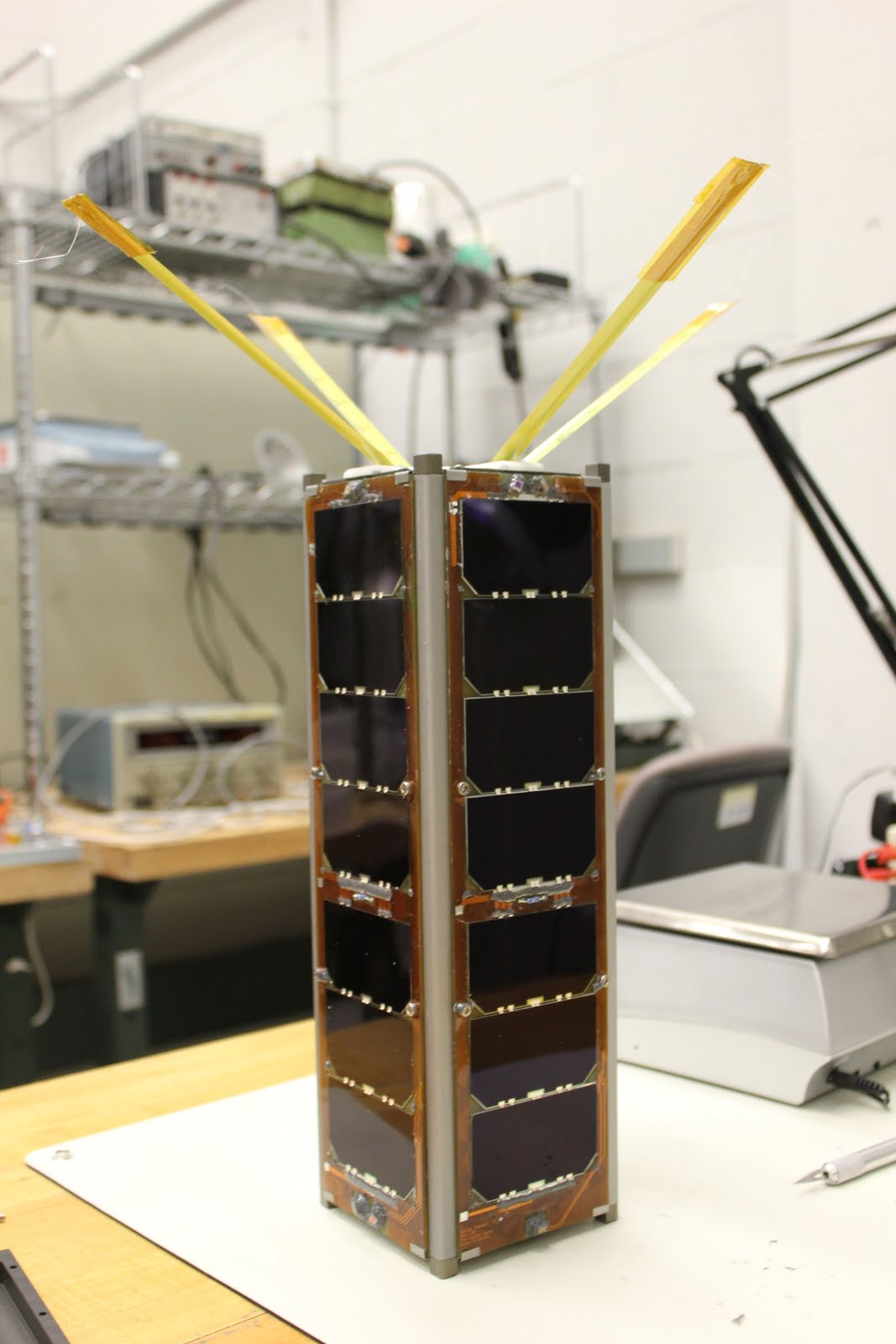
- RAX-2 under construction
- Mission type: Auroral research
- Operator: SRI International; University of Michigan
- COSPAR ID: 2011-061D
- SATCAT no.: 37853

Spacecraft properties
- Spacecraft type: 3U CubeSat

Start of mission
- Launch date: 28 October 2011, 09:48:02 UTC
- Rocket: Delta II 7920-10C
- Launch site: Vandenberg SLC-2W
- Contractor: United Launch Alliance

End of mission
- Last contact: 10 April 2013

Orbital parameters
- Reference system: Geocentric
- Regime: Low Earth
- Semi-major axis: 6,964.69 kilometers (4,327.66 mi)
- Eccentricity: 0.0203467
- Perigee altitude: 451 kilometers (280 mi)
- Apogee altitude: 735 kilometers (457 mi)
- Inclination: 101.71 degrees
- Period: 96.41 minutes
- Epoch: 24 January 2015, 22:19:36 UTC

RAX-2 (Radio Aurora Explorer 2) is a CubeSat satellite built as a collaboration between SRI International and students at the University of Michigan College of Engineering. It is the second spacecraft in the RAX mission. The RAX-1 mission ended after approximately two months of operation due to a gradual degradation of the solar panels that ultimately resulted in a loss of power. RAX team members applied the lessons learned from RAX-1 to the design of a second flight unit, RAX-2, which performs the same mission concept of RAX-1 (launched in November 2010) with improved bus performance and additional operational modes. Science measurements are enhanced through interactive experiments with high power ionospheric heaters where FAI will be generated on demand.

RAX-2 was launched from Vandenberg Air Force Base in October 2011 atop a Delta II rocket.

== Spacecraft design ==
With the exception of the solar panels, the designs of RAX-1 and RAX-2 are largely identical. RAX-1 and RAX-2 are standard 3U CubeSats with physical dimensions of approximately 10 cm x 10 cm x 34 cm and approximate mass of 3 kg. The satellites conform to the 3U CubeSat standard such that they can be launched from the Cal Poly P-POD, a specialized container and deployment mechanism by engineers at Cal Poly San Luis Obispo that many launch providers are able to attach as secondary payloads to their launch vehicles.

=== Design strategy ===
The general design strategy for RAX was to make use of commercial off-the-shelf (COTS) components to reduce development time and cost. Several of RAX's subsystems consist of a central commercial component with support electronics (power, bus communication, switches, etc.) built around it. However, there were many instances where subsystems needed to be designed from the ground up because COTS solutions did not meet mission requirements. While these instances cost the team a great deal of time and funds, the benefit was the development of in-house expertise for building customizable systems for future Michigan missions. Please see the subsystems section below for specific design details.

=== Design implementation ===
RAX is divided into seven subsystems, one payload, 15 total circuit boards, 7 microprocessors, and two FPGAs. The subsystem boards are designed around the PC-104 standard so that each board plugs into another at the 104-pin header from the base of the satellite up to the payload. From there, individual interconnects run from the electronics stack to the payload receiver. Aluminum rails run through each corner of the board, and threaded standoffs are located above and below to lock each board in place. The four long sides of the satellite are covered with eight solar cells each, leaving the top and bottom panels open for the communication and GPS antennas.

RAX-2 is a stack of three standard 'CubeSat' modules weighing about 3 kg. The flight computer is a Texas Instruments MSP430-based while the processing of scientific data is done with a 520 MHz PXA270. Communications are by means of a UHF transceiver with downlink speeds of 38.4 kbit/s, and an S-band downlink for scientific data that provides 115.2 kbit/s downlink.

== Mission overview ==
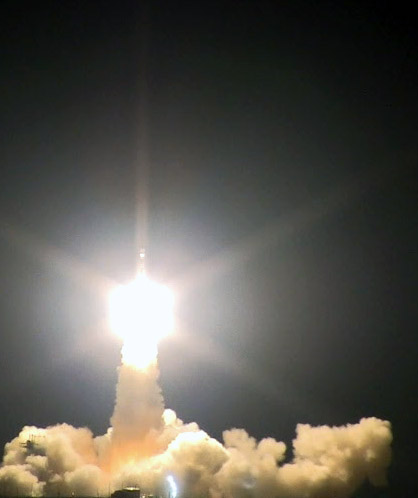
The Delta II carrying RAX-2, five other CubeSats, and the NPP Earth observing satellite, launching from Vandenberg AFB on 28 Oct 2011

The primary mission objective of RAX-2 is to study large plasma formations in the ionosphere, the highest region of our atmosphere. These plasma structures, a form of turbulence called field-aligned irregularities (FAIs), can distort communication and navigation signals such as global positioning systems (GPS).

To study FAI, the RAX mission will utilize a large incoherent scatter radar in Poker Flats, Alaska (known as PFISR). PFISR will transmit powerful radio signals into the plasma instabilities that will be scattered into space. During that time, the RAX spacecraft will be orbiting overhead and recording the scatter signals with an onboard receiver. These signal recordings will be processed by an onboard computer and transmitted back to our ground stations where scientists will analyze them. The goal of this one-year science mission is to enhance our understanding of FAI formation so that short-term forecast models can be generated. This will aid spacecraft operators with planning their mission operations around periods of expected communication disruption.

RAX-2 builds on the RAX-1 heritage to continue the scientific mission; it is a reflection of students learning from experience, and implementing new, more inventive technologies firsthand. RAX-2 was developed to correct the power failure and enable scientific experiments at regular intervals.

=== Launch ===
RAX-2 launched on October 28, 2011, as a secondary payload on NASA's NPP (NPOESS Preparatory Project) mission. The CubeSat launch was sponsored by NASA as part of the ELaNa-3 program. It launched from Vandenberg Air Force Base in central California on a United Launch Alliance Delta II rocket, flying in the 7920-10 configuration. CubeSat separation occurred 98 minutes after launch, and beacons from RAX-2 were heard shortly thereafter.

This was a multi-payload mission with five other CubeSats, M-Cubed, AubieSat-1, DICE-1, DICE-2, and Explorer-1.

=== Mission science ===
The objective of the RAX mission is to understand the microphysics that lead to the formation of magnetic field-aligned plasma irregularities (FAI), an anomaly known to disrupt communications with orbiting spacecraft. The RAX mission is specifically designed to remotely measure, with extremely high angular resolution, the 3-D k-spectrum (spatial Fourier transform) of ~1 m scale FAI as a function of altitude, in particular measuring the magnetic field alignment of the irregularities.

The RAX mission will use a network of existing ground radars that will scatter signals off the FAI to be measured by a receiver on the RAX spacecraft. The spacecraft will measure "radio aurora", or the Bragg scattering from FAI that are illuminated with a narrow beam incoherent scatter radar (ISR) on the ground. This remote sensing method is based on the powerful mathematical relation that the radio aurora intensity is proportional to the irregularity k-spectrum evaluated at the Bragg wave number.

The ground-to-space bistatic radar experiment highly resolves the k-spectrum, which means that the sensed volume of plasma is homogeneous and that the received signal contains a pure content of wave vectors, which are important for accurate analysis of wave growth and damping. Moreover, each experiment will be tagged with the convection electric field Ec, a principal driver of the irregularities, which will be measured (besides altitude profiles of plasma density and temperatures) by the ISR during an experiment.

The RAX mission is a unique opportunity to quantify plasma processes in a homogeneously resolved volume of plasma with the driving force and the effect measured effectively simultaneously.

== Scientific discoveries and original experimental research ==
RAX-2 successfully made the first-ever measurement of naturally occurring auroral turbulence recorded using a nanosatellite radar receiver. The distinctive radar echoes recorded on March 8 were taken with the Radio Aurora Explorer (RAX) CubeSat. The RAX nanosatellite measured turbulence over Fairbanks, Alaska that was a direct result of a geomagnetic storm triggered by the largest solar flare in the past five years. The Earth's high latitude ionosphere, a region of the upper atmosphere associated with solar-driven aurora or "northern lights," becomes highly unstable when large currents flow during geomagnetic storms. RAX was specifically designed by SRI and the University of Michigan to measure this auroral turbulence from an orbital vantage point inaccessible to traditional ground-based radars.

"The RAX radar echo discovery has convincingly proved that miniature satellites, beyond their role as teaching tools, can provide high caliber measurements for fundamental space weather research," said Therese Moretto Jorgensen, Ph.D., Geospace program director in the Division of Atmospheric and Geospace Sciences at the National Science Foundation.

== See also ==
- Radio Aurora Explorer
