= Progress M-11M =

Russian aircraft

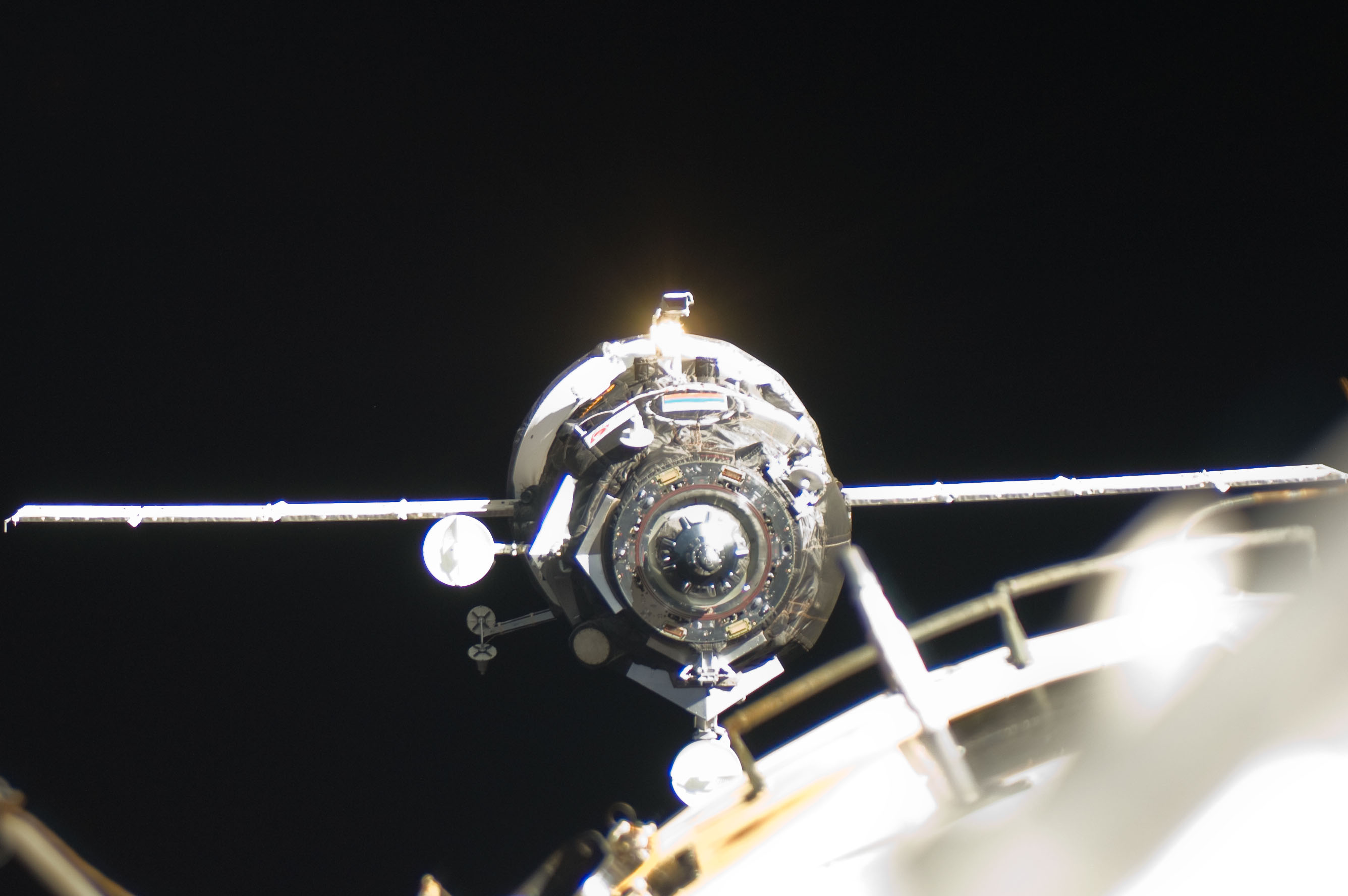
- Progress M-11M approaches the ISS on 23 June 2011.
- Mission type: ISS resupply
- Operator: Roskosmos
- COSPAR ID: 2011-027A
- SATCAT no.: 37679
- Mission duration: 72 days

Spacecraft properties
- Spacecraft type: Progress-M s/n 411
- Manufacturer: RKK Energia

Start of mission
- Launch date: 21 June 2011, 14:38 UTC
- Rocket: Soyuz-U
- Launch site: Baikonur, Site 1/5

End of mission
- Disposal: Deorbited
- Decay date: 1 September 2011

Orbital parameters
- Reference system: Geocentric
- Regime: Low Earth
- Inclination: 51.6°
- Epoch: 21 June 2011

Docking with ISS
- Docking port: Zvezda aft
- Docking date: 23 June 2011, 16:37 UTC
- Undocking date: 23 August 2011
- Time docked: 61 days

Cargo
- Mass: 2673 kg
- Pressurised: 1900 kg (dry cargo)
- Fuel: 740 kg
- Gaseous: 50 kg (oxygen and air)
- Water: 420 kg
- Progress ISS Resupply

Progress M-11M (Russian: Прогресс М-11М), identified by NASA as Progress 43P, is a Progress spacecraft which was launched on 21 June 2011 to resupply the International Space Station. It was the eleventh Progress-M 11F615A60 spacecraft to be launched. The spacecraft is manufactured by RKK Energia, and will be operated by the Russian Federal Space Agency. Progress M-11M transferred more than 2500 kg of cargo to the Space Station, including food, water, scientific hardware, propellant, and cargo for the Russian Federal Space Agency (Roscosmos), NASA and the Japanese Space Agency, (JAXA).

== Launch ==
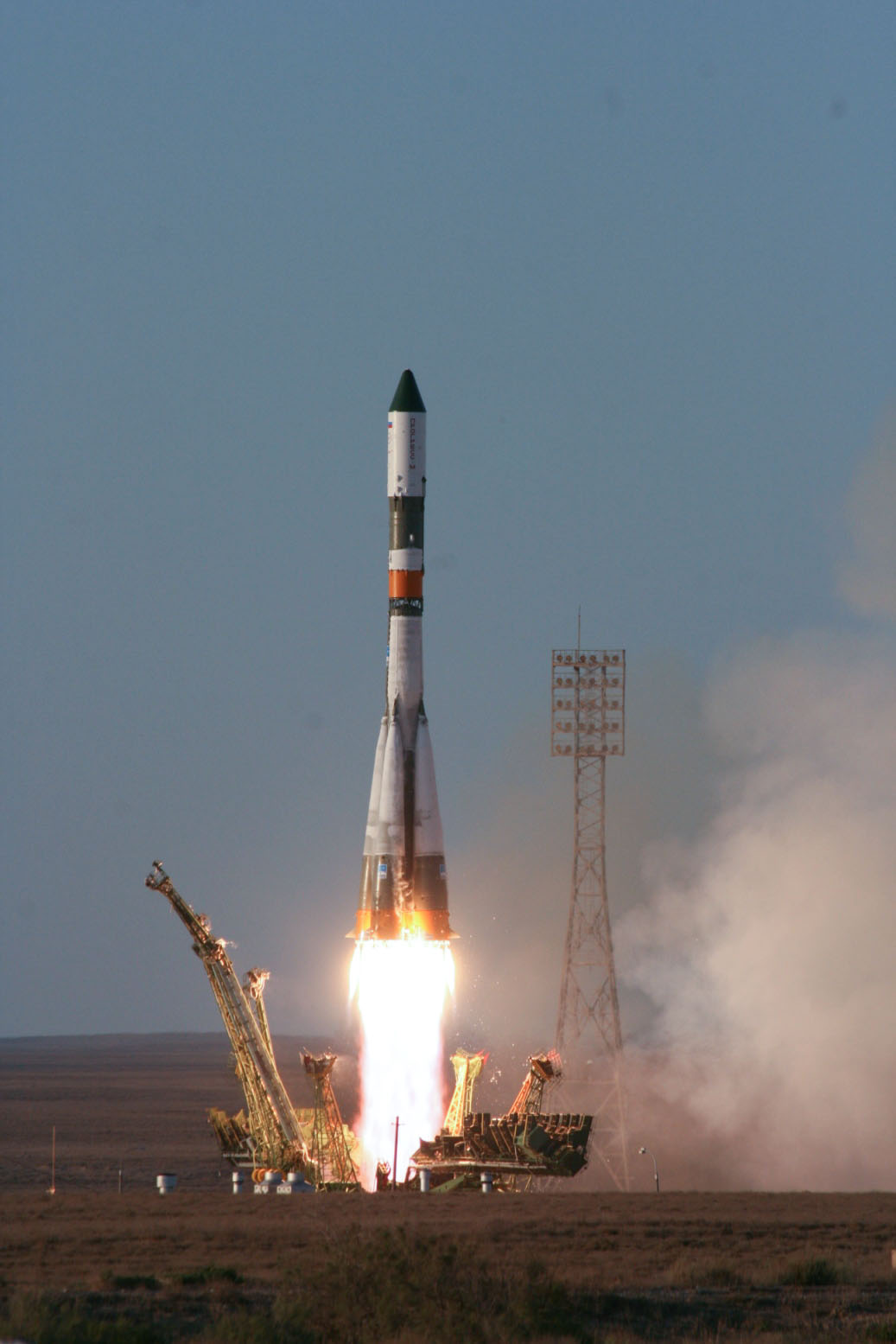
Progress M-11M launches from Baikonur's pad 1 on 21 June 2011.

The Soyuz-U rocket that carried the Progress M-11M cargo spacecraft into orbit was rolled out on 19 June 2011. Following the roll out, the rocket was erected in vertical in Baikonur's pad 1. L-2 days, operations were successfully completed on the day with integrated tests that included verification of the launch facilities and simulation of the lift-off and initial stages of the launch sequence.

The Progress M-11M was lifted off atop a Soyuz-U rocket from the Baikonur Space Center in Kazakhstan. After the launch, the spacecraft reached a preliminary orbit of 240.09 km by 193.96 km. The revolution of the successfully injected orbit was 88.54 minutes. A series of engine firings over the next two days guided the ship to set up a rendezvous with the Space Station.

== Docking ==
Progress M-11M docked with the Zvezda service module of the Space Station at 16:37 UTC on 23 June 2011. The docking occurred 394 km above eastern Kazakhstan and under monitoring of the mission control center and the station crew after Progress ship approached the station on auto pilot. The docking was monitored by the Mission Control Center in Moscow and the station Expedition 28 crew.

== Cargo ==
The cargo of Progress M-11M included 1276 kg of equipment, food, clothing, life support system gear, 740 kg of propellant, 420 kg of water and some 50 kg of oxygen and air.

=== Inventory ===
Total cargo mass delivered: 2673 kg

Item description	Mass (kg)
Propellant in the propulsion system tanks for the ISS needs	250
Propellant in the refuelling system tanks	740
Oxygen	50
Water in the Rodnik system tanks	420
Items in the cargo compartment	1213
ECLSS	189
Water supply system	45
Thermal control system	8
On-board TM system	2
Onboard measure system	1
Maintenance and repair equipment	4
Sanitary and hygienic items	64
Individual fire protection items	3
Food containers, fresh products	249
Medical equipment, linen, personal hygienic and prophylactics items	42
FGB hardware	82
Rassvet hardware	21
Science experimental hardware, including experimental	42
Russian crew's items	77
On-board documentation files, crew provisions, video- and photo-equipment	22
US Orbital Segment hardware	362

== Station reboost ==
The four attitude thrusters of Progress M-11M was fired on 1 July 2011 to reboost the Space Station. After the burn, the ISS orbit was raised by 3.5 km and achieved 388.3 km. The purpose of the reboost was to gain altitude and set up phasing conditions for Space Shuttle Atlantis' STS-135 (ULF7) mission.

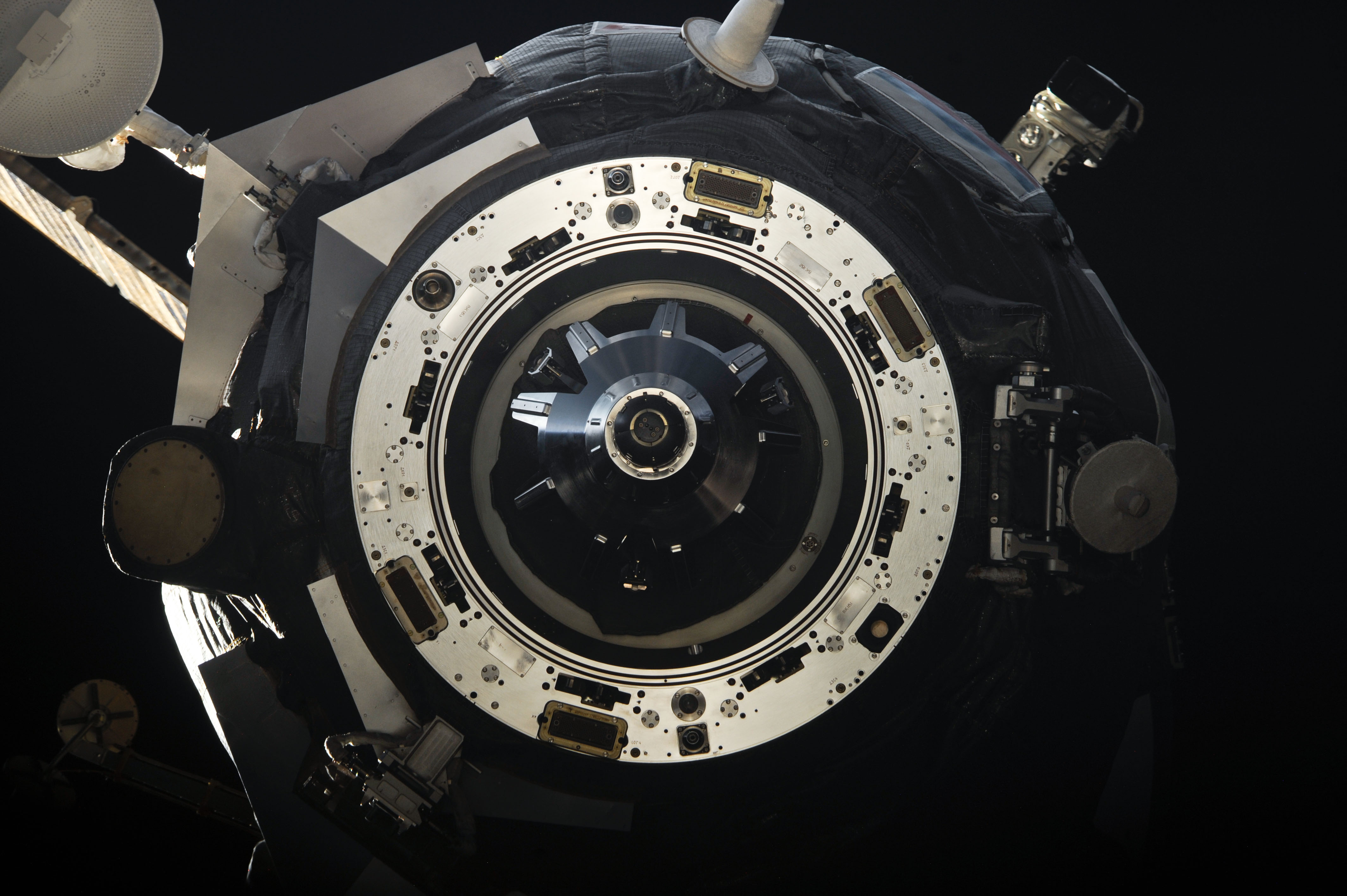
Progress M-11M departs the ISS on 23 August 2011.
