= Explorer-1 Prime =

Picosatellite built by the Space Science and Engineering Laboratory

Explorer-1 [Prime]
- Mission type: Radiation research
- Operator: Space Science and Engineering Laboratory (SSEL), Montana State University - Bozeman
- Mission duration: Failed to orbit

Spacecraft properties
- Bus: 1U CubeSat

Start of mission
- Launch date: 4 March 2011, 10:06 UTC
- Rocket: Taurus-XL
- Launch site: Vandenberg LC-576E

Orbital parameters
- Reference system: Geocentric orbit
- Regime: Low Earth orbit
- Epoch: Planned

Explorer-1 [Prime], also known as E1P and Electra, was a CubeSat-class picosatellite built by the Space Science and Engineering Laboratory (SSEL) at Montana State University. It was launched aboard a Taurus-XL rocket from Vandenberg Air Force Base, California on 4 March 2011, but failed to achieve orbit after the rocket malfunctioned.

As part of NASA's ELaNA program, E1P was to be launched along with NASA's Glory satellite, the Kentucky Space KySat-1 and the University of Colorado Boulder Hermes CubeSats.

E1P was a re-flight mission of Explorer 1, the first American satellite, using modern technology including a Geiger tube donated by James Van Allen. The name of the satellite was also adopted from Van Allen, who referred to the satellite as Explorer-1 Prime prior to his death in 2006.

It was originally intended to be launched in 2008 to commemorate the 50th anniversary of the launch of Explorer 1. If it had been successful, E1P would have been Montana's first successful launch of a satellite after the loss of SSEL's MEROPE in 2006.

There was a spare, Explorer-1 Prime Unit 2, that was launched with NPP.

The Michigan Exploration Laboratory (MXL) suspects that the M-Cubed CubeSat, a joint project run by MXL and JPL, became magnetically conjoined to Explorer-1 Prime Unit 2, a second CubeSat released at the same time, via strong onboard magnets used for passive attitude control (see: Magnetorquer), after deploying on October 28, 2011. This is the first non-destructive latching of two satellites.

== See also ==
- Explorer-1 Prime Unit 2
- List of CubeSats
