= Kentucky Space =

Kentucky Space is a non-profit consortium of private and public universities, companies, and other organizations with the goal of designing and leading innovative space missions within realistic budgets and objectives. The enterprise is supported by the Kentucky Space Grant Consortium and developed out of the programs of the Kentucky Science and Technology Corporation.

== Consortium ==
- Kentucky Science and Technology Corporation
- Kentucky Council on Postsecondary Education
- Kentucky Science and Engineering Foundation
- Kentucky Space Grant Consortium
- Belcan
- Morehead State University
- Murray State University
- University of Kentucky - Space Systems Laboratory
- University of Louisville
- Western Kentucky University
- Kentucky Community and Technical College System

== Partners ==
- NASA Ames Research Center
- Kentucky Virtual Campus

== Projects ==
- KySat-1, a CubeSat designed by Kentucky Space which defines a standard reusable bus and was intended to be used as part of a program intended to interest and involve school children in science. It was lost during a failure of the Taurus XL rocket during launch on March 4, 2011.
- Space Express 1, a suborbital solid-fuel rocket payload launched in 2007 from White Sands Missile Range.
- Balloon-1, a high-altitude balloon payload launched from Bowling Green, Kentucky on July 14, 2008.
- Space Express 2, an inertial measurement unit payload designed for a Garvey Spacecraft Corporation rocket.
- KySat-2, a CubeSat re-designed by Kentucky Space to fulfil the original mission of KySat-1. It was successfully launched and activated on November 19, 2013, aboard a Minotaur I

== Asteroid mining ==
On August 4–6, 2008 a group of space professionals, entrepreneurs, venture capitalists and mining engineers gathered in Pleasant Hill, Kentucky to discuss the development of an asteroid resource development business strategy. The discussion ranged from space technology, propulsion, and orbital mechanics to space law, markets, value proposition and financial plans.

== See also ==
- List of space agencies
