= Galileo (disambiguation) =

Galileo Galilei (1564–1642) was a scientist and philosopher.

Galileo may also refer to:

== Aerospace ==
- Galileo (satellite navigation system)
- Galileo project to send a probe to Jupiter
  - Galileo (spacecraft), the probe itself
- Telescopio Nazionale Galileo, an astronomical telescope
- Project Galileo, an educational astronomy resource
- Galileo Regio, a feature of Jupiter's moon Ganymede
- Galileo Observatory, two NASA atmospheric and ionospheric research planes, also used for airborne astronomy

== Companies ==
- Galileo Games, a role-playing games publisher
- Galileo Industries, an aerospace company
- Galileo Records, a Switzerland-based record label
- Galileo Global Education, a French for-profit education company

== Computing ==
- Galileo (operating system), an Acorn Computers project
- Galileo (supercomputer), a supercomputer in Italy
- Galileo GDS, a reservation system
- Georgia Library Learning Online (GALILEO), a virtual library
- Intel Galileo, a hobby-oriented development board
- Galileo, a release of the Eclipse software development environment
- Galileo, a codename for version 3.0 of the Windows CE operating system
- Galileo, a RCS platform from Hacking Team

== Films and television ==
- Galileo (1975 film), an adaptation of Bertolt Brecht's play Life of Galileo
- Galileo (1968 film), a biographical film by Liliana Cavani
- Galileo (Japanese TV series), a Japanese television drama based on Detective Galileo
- Galileo (German TV series), a science program
- "Galileo", an episode of The West Wing
- Galileo: The Space Awakens, a program broadcast by tvN in South Korea

== Music ==
- "Galileo" (song), a 1992 single by the Indigo Girls from Rites of Passage
- "Galileo", a single by GG Allin
- "Galileo", a song by Amy Grant from Heart in Motion
- "Galileo", a song by Mice Parade from Late Night Tales: The Flaming Lips
- "Galileo (Someone Like You)", a song by Declan O'Rourke, covered by other artists
- "Galileo", a song by Puscifer from Money Shot
- "Galileo", a song by Kep1er from their 2023 EP Magic Hour

== Schools ==
- Galileo University, Guatemala
- Galileo Academy of Science and Technology, formerly Galileo High School, a school in California
- Galileo Magnet High School, Virginia

== Other uses ==
- Galileo (horse), an Irish Thoroughbred racehorse
- Galileo (magazine), a science fiction magazine
- Galileo (musical), a rock musical by Danny Strong, Zoe Sarnak and Michael Weiner
- Galileo (planet), an exoplanet also known as 55 Cancri Ab
- Gallileo (skyscraper), a high-rise building in Frankfurt
- Galileo (Star Trek), a fictional spacecraft on Star Trek
- Galileo (unit), a unit of measurement
- Galileo (vibration training)
- Camp Galileo, California
- Galileo thermometer
- Galileo, a rocket in Rocket Ship Galileo
- Galileo, a yacht by Aegean Yacht
- Galileo, a character from Power Players
- The Galileo Project, a science project to search for ET traces near Earth and investigate UAP/UFOs

== People with the given name ==
- Galileo Chini (1873–1956), Italian decorator, designer, painter, and potter
- Galileo Ferraris (1847–1897), Italian physicist and electrical engineer

== See also ==
- Galileo Galilei (disambiguation)
- Galilean (disambiguation)
- Galileu, a science magazine
- Life of Galileo, a 1940 play by Bertolt Brecht
- "My Galileo", a song by Belarus in the Eurovision Song Contest
