= Galilee (disambiguation) =

Galilee is a large region overlapping with much of the Northern District of Israel, that is traditionally divided into three regions. It also refers to a body of water.

- Upper Galilee
- Lower Galilee
- Western Galilee
- Sea of Galilee

Galilee or Galilea may also refer to:

== Places ==
=== Australia ===
- Galilee, Queensland, a locality in the Barcaldine Region
- Galilee Basin, a large coal resource in Queensland, Australia

=== United States ===
- Galilee, New Jersey, an unincorporated community in the United States
- Galilee, Pennsylvania, an unincorporated community in the United States
- Galilee, Rhode Island, an unincorporated community in the United States.

=== Elsewhere ===
- Galilea, La Rioja, Spain
- Galilee, Saskatchewan, an unincorporated community in Canada
- 697 Galilea, a minor planet
- Galilea Airport, Puerto Galilea, Peru

== Ships ==
- Galilee (ship), an American brigantine built in 1891
- USS Galilea, a U.S. Navy vehicle landing ship built during World War II

== Other uses ==
- Galilee (church architecture), the vestibule in a number of medieval Western monasteries
- Galilee (horse), an Australian racehorse
- Galilee (novel), a novel by Clive Barker
- Galilea Games, a video game developer; see Jack the Ripper
- Galilee of the Nations, a record label

== See also ==
- Galilean (disambiguation)
- Galiléia, a municipality in Minas Gerais, Brazil
