= Galilean (disambiguation) =

A Galilean is a person from Galilee, a region of northern Israel and southern Lebanon

Galilean may also refer to:

- Related to Galilee
  - Jesus, who was raised in Galilee
  - Galilean dialect, the form of Jewish Palestinian Aramaic spoken by people in Galilee during the late Second Temple period
  - Galilean faith, ancient name for Christianity
- Related to Galileo Galilei, early modern Italian natural philosopher
  - Galilean moons, the four largest moons of Jupiter, discovered by Galileo
  - Galilean telescope, early refracting telescope design used by Galileo
    - Galilean binoculars, designed on the same principle as the Galilean telescope
  - Galilean cannon, a device that demonstrates conservation of linear momentum
  - Galilean thermometer, a sealed glass cylinder containing a clear liquid and several glass vessels of varying density
  - Galilean invariance, states that the laws of motion are the same in all inertial frames
    - Galilean transformation, used to transform between the coordinates of two reference frames which differ only by constant relative motion
    - Galilean equivalence principle, universality of free fall
    - Galilean electromagnetism, a formal electromagnetic field theory that is consistent with Galilean invariance

== See also ==
- Emperor and Galilean, a play by Henrik Ibsen
- Jose the Galilean, a Jewish sage who lived in the 1st and 2nd centuries CE
- Judas the Galilean, a Jewish leader who led resistance to the census imposed for Roman tax purposes by Quirinius in Judea Province around 6 CE
- Against the Galileans, essay by the Roman emperor Julian the Apostate
- Galilee (disambiguation)
- Galileo (disambiguation)
