= BeiDou =

Chinese global navigation satellite system

BeiDou Navigation Satellite System
- Logo of BeiDou
- Country/ies of origin: China
- Operator: China National Space Administration
- Type: Military, commercial
- Status: Operational
- Coverage: Global
- Accuracy: 3.6 m (global, public); 2.6 m (Asia Pacific, public); 10 cm (encrypted)

Constellation size
- Nominal satellites: 30
- Current usable satellites: 35 (Beidou-3) 15 (Beidou-2)
- First launch: 31 October 2000
- Last launch: 19 September 2024
- Total launches: 59

Orbital characteristics
- Regime(s): GEO, IGSO, MEO
- Orbital period: 7/13 sd or 12 hours and 53 minutes
- Revisit period: 7 sidereal days
- Website: en.beidou.gov.cn

The BeiDou Navigation Satellite System (BDS; Chinese: 北斗卫星导航系统; pinyin: běidǒu wèixīng dǎoháng xìtǒng) is a satellite-based radio navigation system owned and operated by the China National Space Administration. It provides geolocation and time information to a BDS receiver anywhere on or near the Earth where there is an unobstructed line of sight to four or more BDS satellites. It does not require the user to transmit any data and operates independently of any telephonic or Internet reception, though these technologies can enhance the usefulness of the BDS positioning information.

The current service, BeiDou-3 (third-generation BeiDou), provides full global coverage for timing and navigation, along with Russia's GLONASS, the European Galileo, and the US's GPS. It comprises satellites in three types of orbits: 24 in medium Earth orbit (global coverage), 3 in inclined geosynchronous orbit (Asia–Pacific coverage), and 3 in geostationary orbit (China coverage). The BeiDou-3 system was fully operational in July 2020. In 2016, BeiDou-3 reached millimeter-level accuracy with post-processing from a nationwide reference station network. In 2023, the International Civil Aviation Organization recognized the BeiDou system as a global standard for commercial aviation.

Predecessors included BeiDou-1 (first-generation BeiDou), consisting of three satellites in a regional satellite navigation system. Since 2000, the system has mainly provided navigation services within China. In December 2012, as the design life of BeiDou-1 expired, it stopped operating. The BeiDou-2 (second-generation BeiDou) system was also a regional satellite navigation system containing 16 satellites, including 6 geostationary satellites, 6 inclined geosynchronous orbit satellites, and 4 medium earth orbit satellites. In November 2012, BeiDou-2 began to provide users with regional positioning services in the Asia-Pacific region. Within the region, BeiDou is more accurate than GPS.

In 2015, fifteen years after the satellite system was launched, it was generating a turnover of $31.5 billion per annum for major companies such as China Aerospace Science and Industry Corporation, AutoNavi, and Norinco. The industry has grown an average of over 20% in value annually to reach $64 billion in 2020.

== Nomenclature ==
The official English name of the system is BeiDou Navigation Satellite System. It is named after the Big Dipper asterism, which is known in Chinese as Běidǒu (Chinese: 北斗). The name literally means "Northern Dipper", the name given by ancient Chinese astronomers to the seven brightest stars of the constellation Ursa Major. Historically, this set of stars was used in navigation to locate the North Star. As such, the name BeiDou also serves as a metaphor for the purpose of the satellite navigation system.

== History ==
=== Conception and initial development ===
The original idea of a Chinese satellite navigation system was conceived by Chen Fangyun and his colleagues in the 1980s. The Gulf War in 1991 showcased how the GPS gave the US complete advantage on the battlefield and how satellite navigation systems can be used to conduct "space warfare". In 1993, China realised the risk of denied access to GPS during the Yinhe incident and including an alleged case in 1996 during the Third Taiwan Strait Crisis, gave impetus to the creation of its own indigenous satellite navigation system which officially began in 1994.

According to the China National Space Administration, in 2010, the development of the system would be carried out in three steps:

1. 2000–2003: experimental BeiDou navigation system consisting of three satellites
2. By 2012: regional BeiDou navigation system covering China and neighboring regions
3. By 2020: global BeiDou navigation system

The first satellite, BeiDou-1A, was launched on 30 October 2000, followed by BeiDou-1B on 20 December 2000. The third satellite, BeiDou-1C (a backup satellite), was put into orbit on 25 May 2003. The successful launch of BeiDou-1C also meant the establishment of the BeiDou-1 navigation system.

On 2 November 2006, China announced that from 2008 BeiDou would offer an open service with accuracies of distance within 10 metres, timing within 0.2 microseconds, and speed within 0.2 metres/second.

In February 2007, the fourth and last satellite of the BeiDou-1 system, BeiDou-1D (sometimes called BeiDou-2A, serving as a backup satellite), was launched. It was reported that the satellite had suffered from a control system malfunction but was then fully restored.

In April 2007, the first satellite of BeiDou-2, namely Compass-M1 (to validate frequencies for the BeiDou-2 constellation) was successfully put into its working orbit. The second BeiDou-2 constellation satellite Compass-G2 was launched on 15 April 2009.

On 15 January 2010, the official website of the BeiDou Navigation Satellite System went online, and the system's third satellite (Compass-G1) was carried into its orbit by a Long March 3C rocket on 17 January 2010.

On 2 June 2010, the fourth satellite was launched successfully into orbit.

The fifth orbiter was launched into space from Xichang Satellite Launch Center by an LM-3I carrier rocket on 1 August 2010.

Three months later, on 1 November 2010, the sixth satellite was sent into orbit by LM-3C.

Another satellite, the BeiDou-2/Compass IGSO-5 (fifth inclined geosynchronous orbit) satellite, was launched from the Xichang Satellite Launch Center by a Long March 3A on 1 December 2011 (UTC).

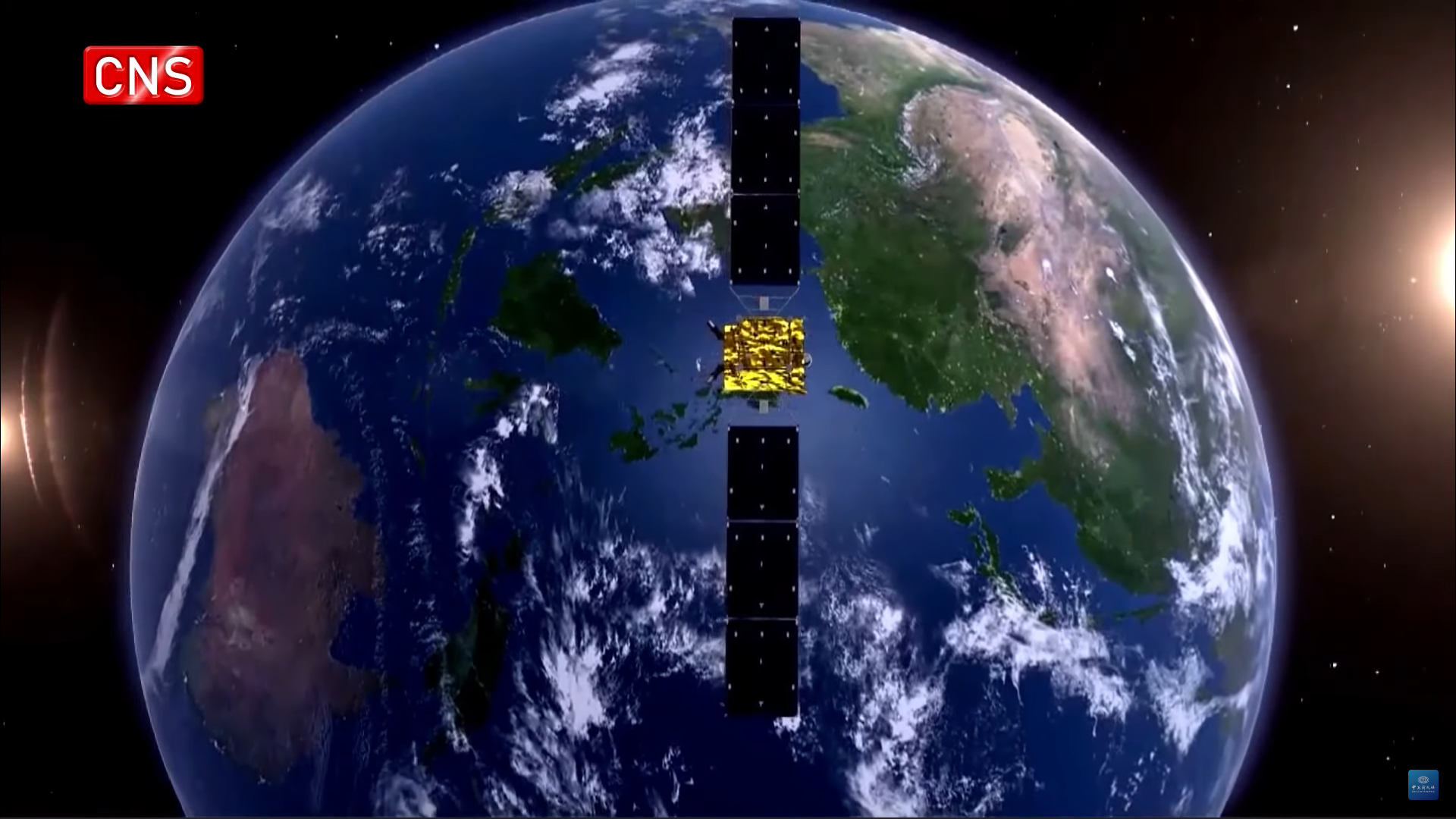
Rendering of BeiDou satellite on Chinese news television

=== Chinese involvement in Galileo system ===
In September 2003, China intended to join the European Galileo positioning system project and was to invest €230 million (US$296 million, £160 million) in Galileo over the next few years. At the time, it was believed that China's "BeiDou" navigation system would then only be used by its armed forces.

In October 2004, China officially joined the Galileo project by signing the Agreement on the Cooperation in the Galileo Program between the "Galileo Joint Undertaking" (GJU) and the "National Remote Sensing Centre of China" (NRSCC). Based on the Sino-European Cooperation Agreement on Galileo program, China Galileo Industries (CGI), the prime contractor of China's involvement in Galileo programs, was founded in December 2004. By April 2006, eleven cooperation projects within the Galileo framework had been signed between China and the EU.

=== Phase III ===
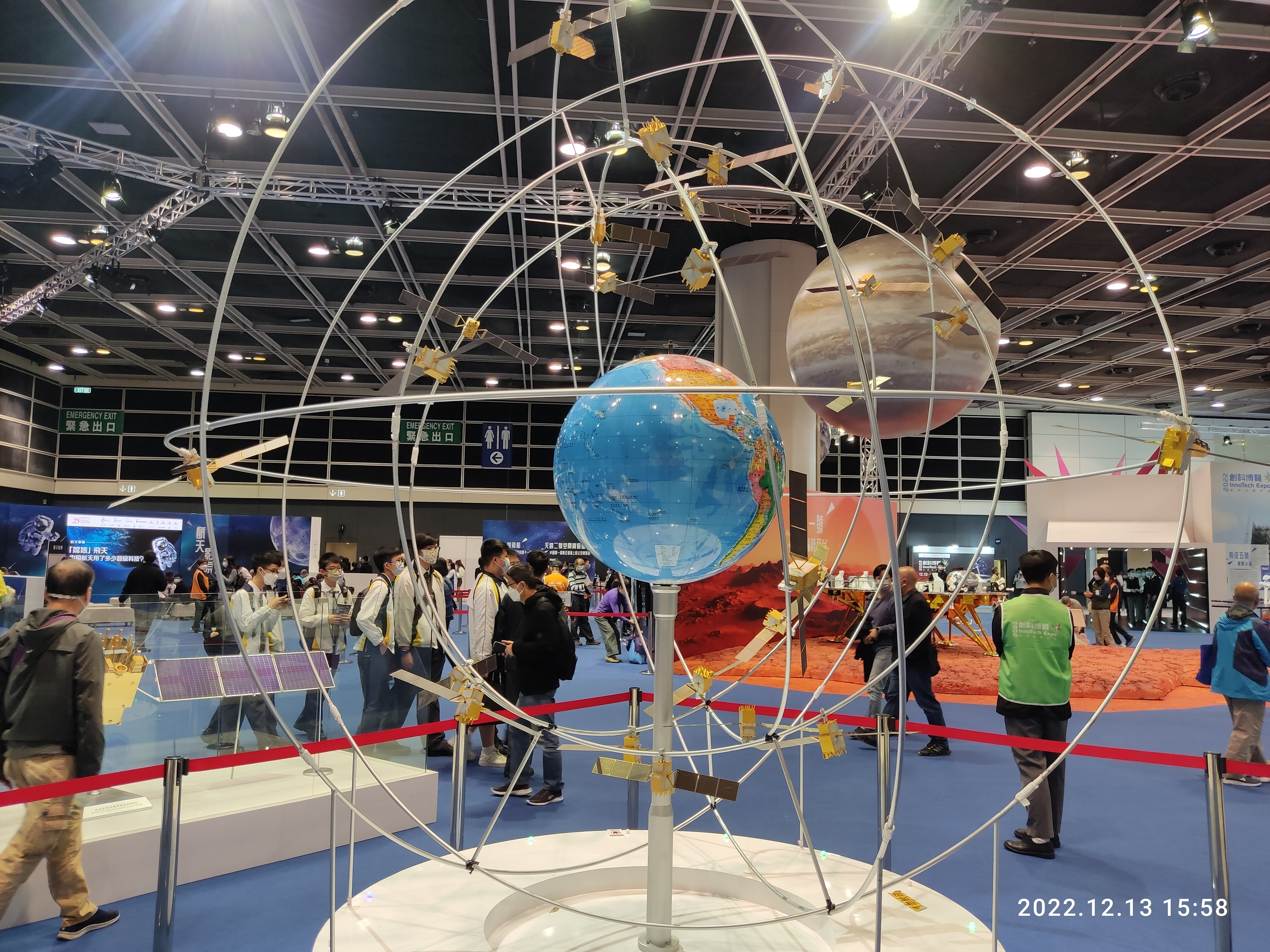
Model of BeiDou Phase III satellite orbits

- In November 2014, BeiDou became part of the World-Wide Radionavigation System (WWRNS) at the 94th meeting of the International Maritime Organization (IMO) Maritime Safety Committee, which approved the "Navigation Safety Circular" of the BeiDou Navigation Satellite System (BDS).
- At Beijing time 21:52, 30 March 2015, the first new-generation BeiDou Navigation satellite (and the 17th overall) was successfully set to orbit by a Long March 3C rocket.
- On 20 April 2019, a BeiDou satellite was successfully launched. Launch occurred at 22:41 Beijing time, and the Long March 3B delivered the BeiDou navigation payload into an elliptical transfer orbit ranging between 220 kilometres and 35,787 kilometres, with an inclination of 28.5° to the equator, according to U.S. military tracking data.
- On 23 June 2020, the final BeiDou satellite was successfully launched, the launch of the 55th satellite in the BeiDou family. The third iteration of the BeiDou Navigation Satellite System provides global coverage for timing and navigation, offering an alternative to Russia's GLONASS and the European Galileo positioning system, as well as the US's GPS.

=== Use outside China ===
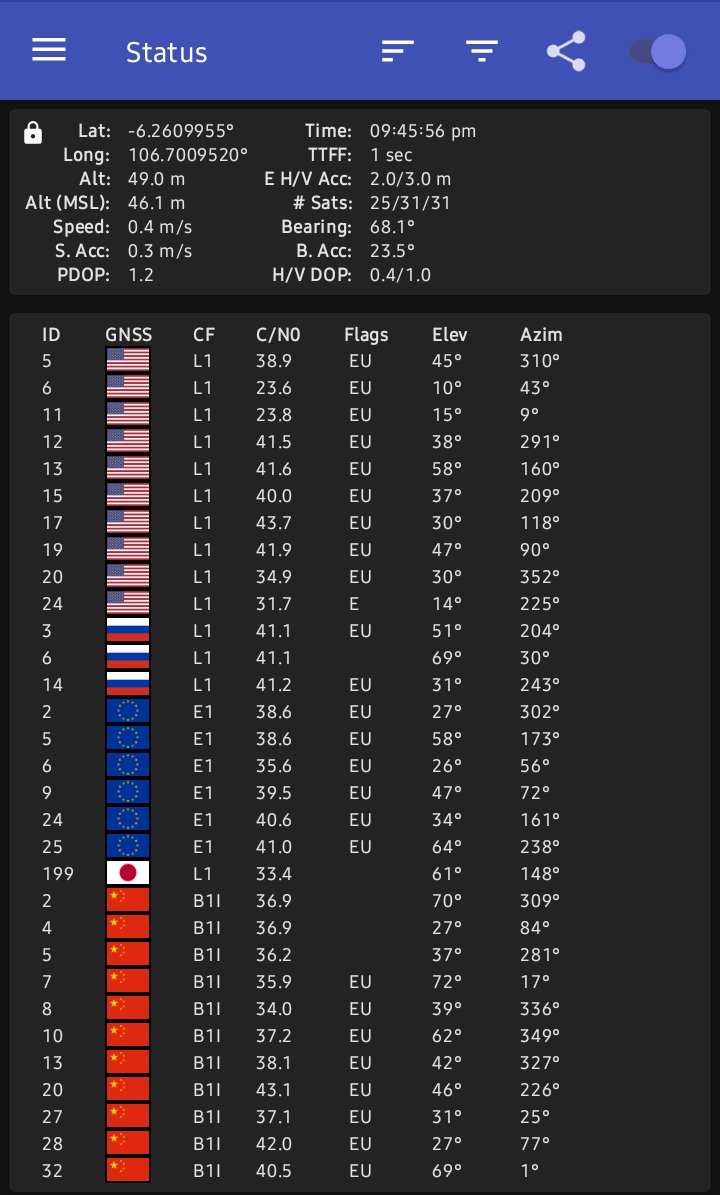
Screenshot of GPSTest application showing BeiDou satellites usage in South Tangerang, Indonesia (2025)

In 2018, the Pakistan Armed Forces received access to BeiDou for military purposes. In 2019, the Saudi Ministry of Defense signed an agreement for military use of BeiDou. In 2020, Argentina entered into a cooperation agreement with China regarding the use of BeiDou. In 2021, the first China-Africa BeiDou System Cooperation Forum was held in Beijing. In 2022, Russian President Vladimir Putin signed an agreement for the interoperability of BeiDou and GLONASS. In the 2026 Iran war, BeiDou was reported to have been used by Iranian missiles.

=== Use in smartphones ===
Chinese smartphone maker Xiaomi featured BeiDou as early as August 2014, on their Mi 4. The earliest known smartphone by South-Korean smartphone maker Samsung to feature BeiDou is the Samsung Galaxy Note 4, released in October 2014. At a similar time, Japanese phone maker Sony implemented BeiDou for the first time on their Xperia Z3. The earliest BeiDou-capable smartphone by American smartphone maker Apple is the iPhone 13, released in September 2021.

== GPS vs. BeiDou Capabilities ==
The U.S. National Space-Based Positioning, Navigation, and Timing (PNT) Advisory Board, which offers independent guidance to the U.S. government on GPS policy, issued a summary report from its 27th meeting held on 16–17 November 2022. During the meeting, it was highlighted that "GPS's capabilities are now substantially inferior to those of China's BeiDou."

== BeiDou-3 ==
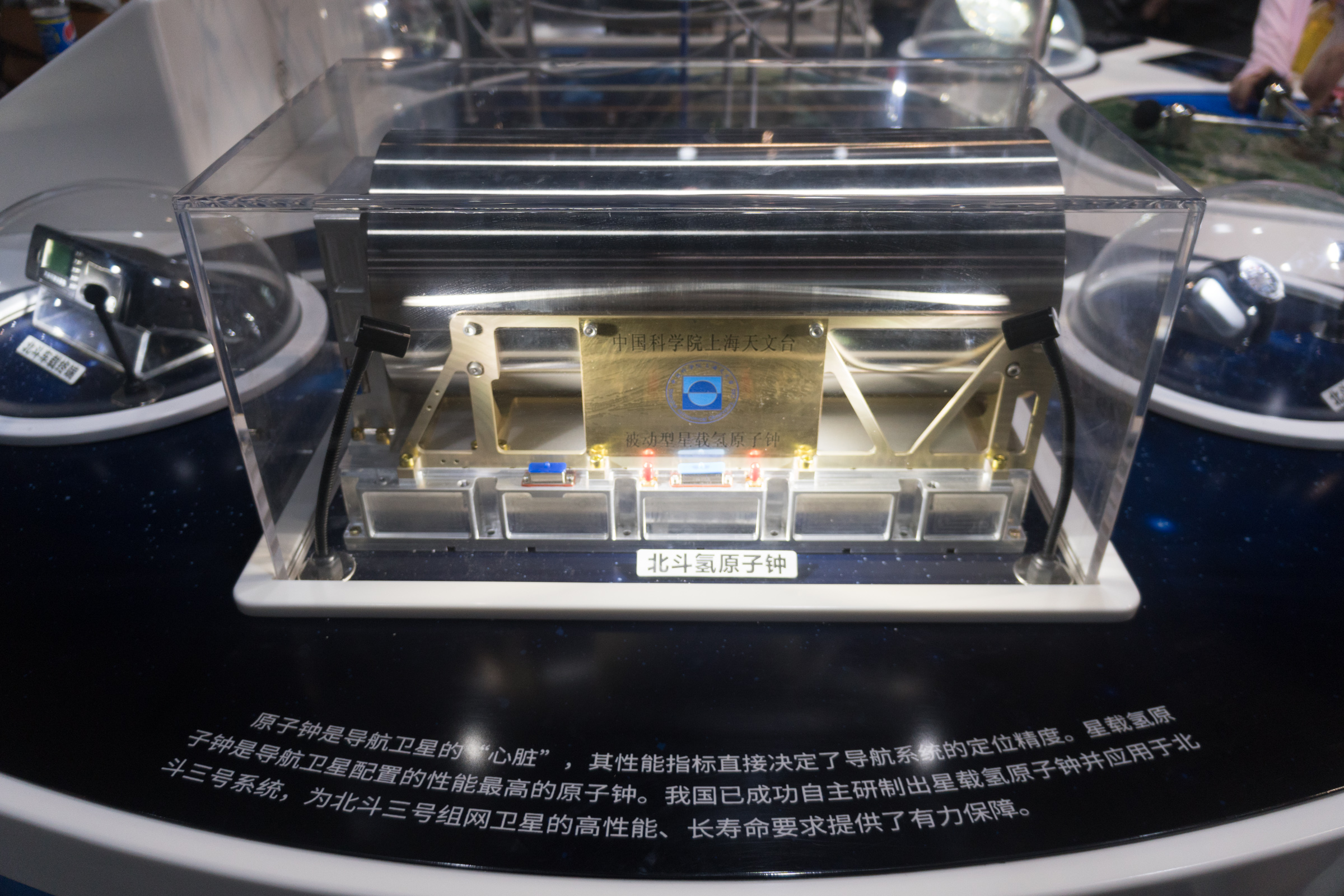
Hydrogen maser used by BeiDou-3

The third phase of the BeiDou system (BDS-3) includes three GEO satellites, three IGSO satellites, and twenty-four MEO satellites which introduce new signal frequencies B1C/B1I/B1A (1575.42 MHz), B2a/B2b (1191.79 MHz), B3I/B3Q/B3A (1268.52 MHz), and Bs test frequency (2492.02 MHz). Interface control documents on the new open signals were published in 2017–2018.

On 23 June 2020, the BDS-3 constellation deployment was fully completed after the last satellite was successfully launched at the Xichang Satellite Launch Center. BDS-3 satellites also include SBAS (B1C, B2a, B1A - GEO sats), Precise Point Positioning (B2b - GEO sats), and search and rescue transponder (6 MEOSAR) capabilities.

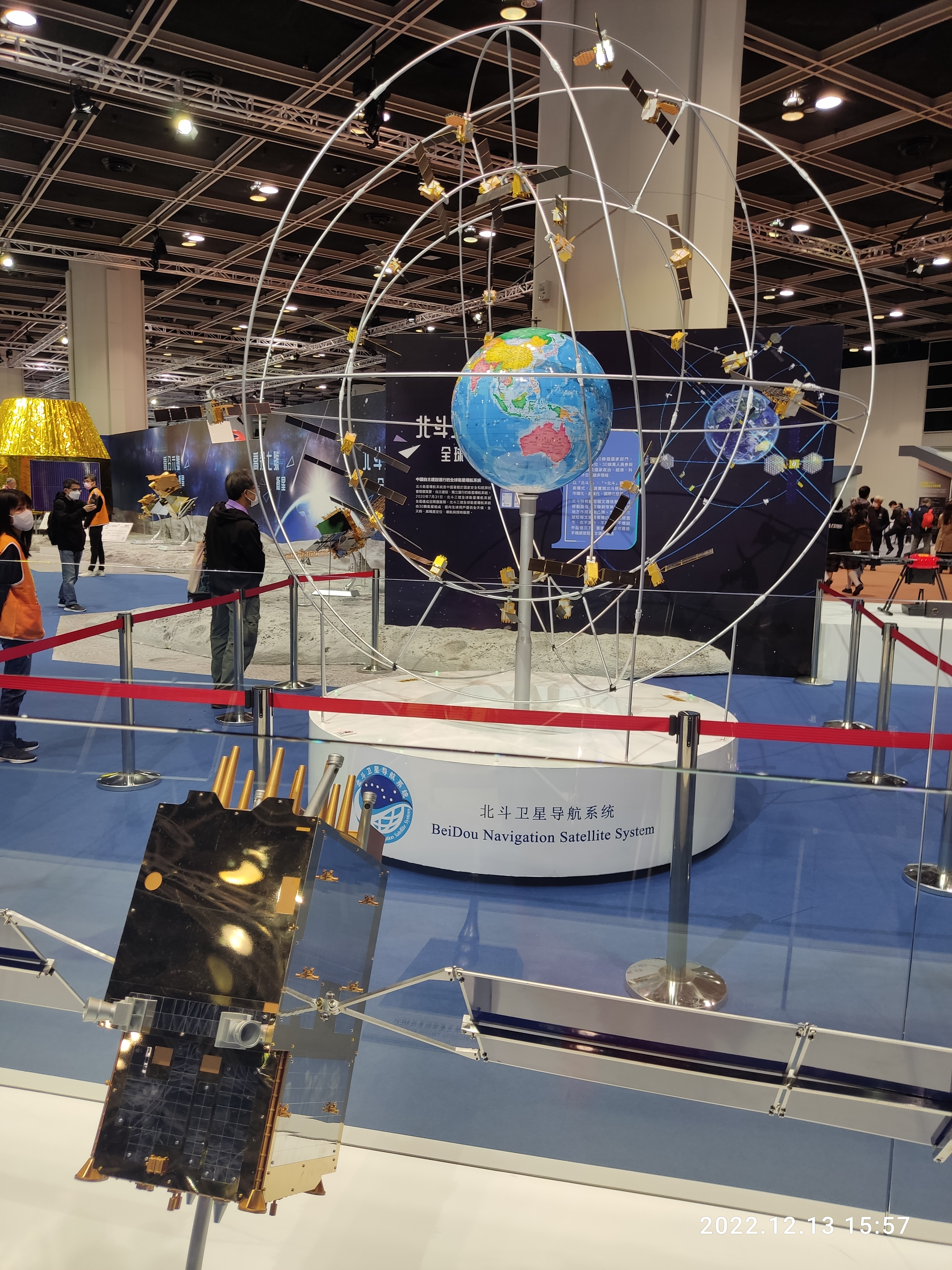
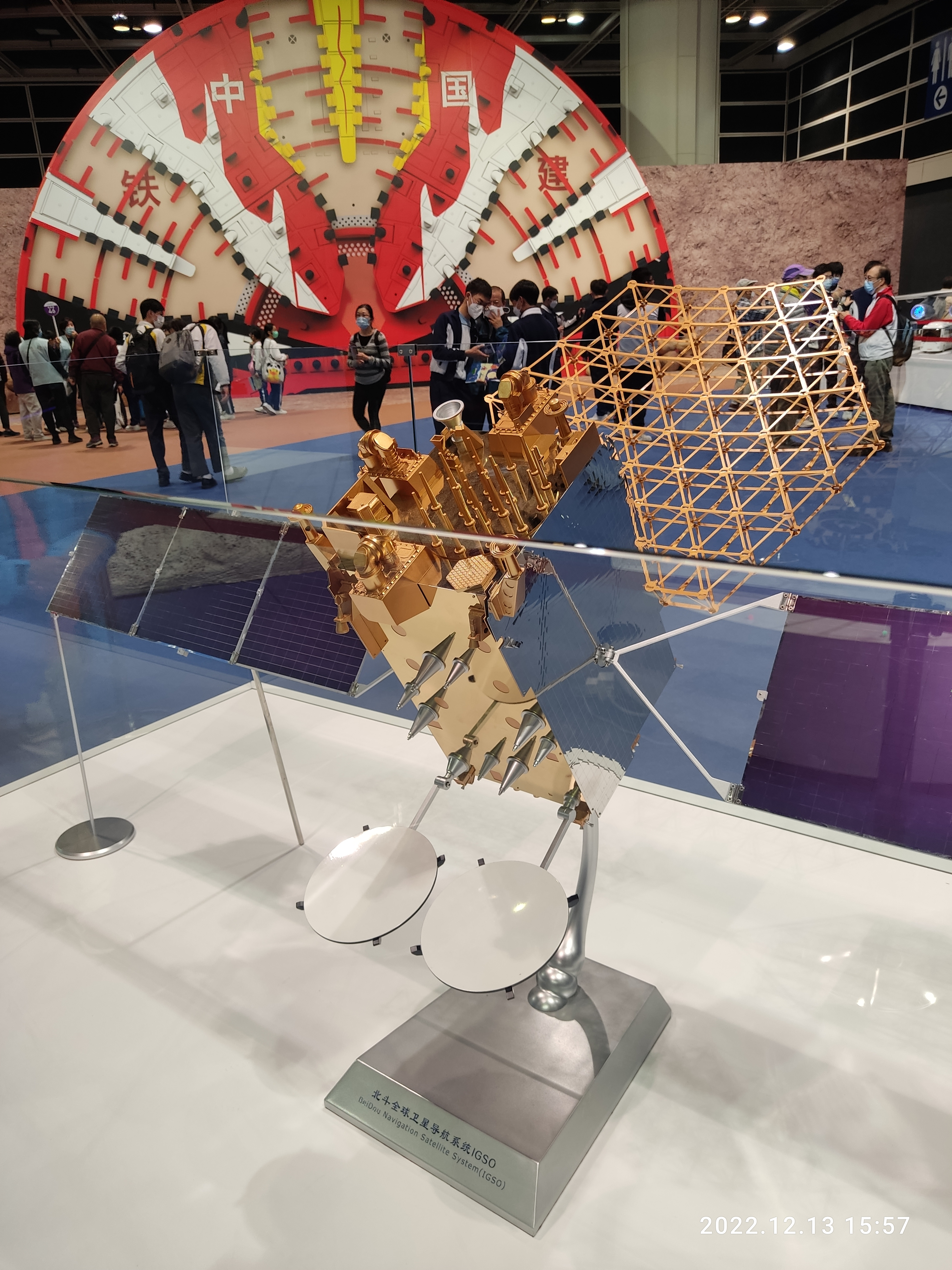
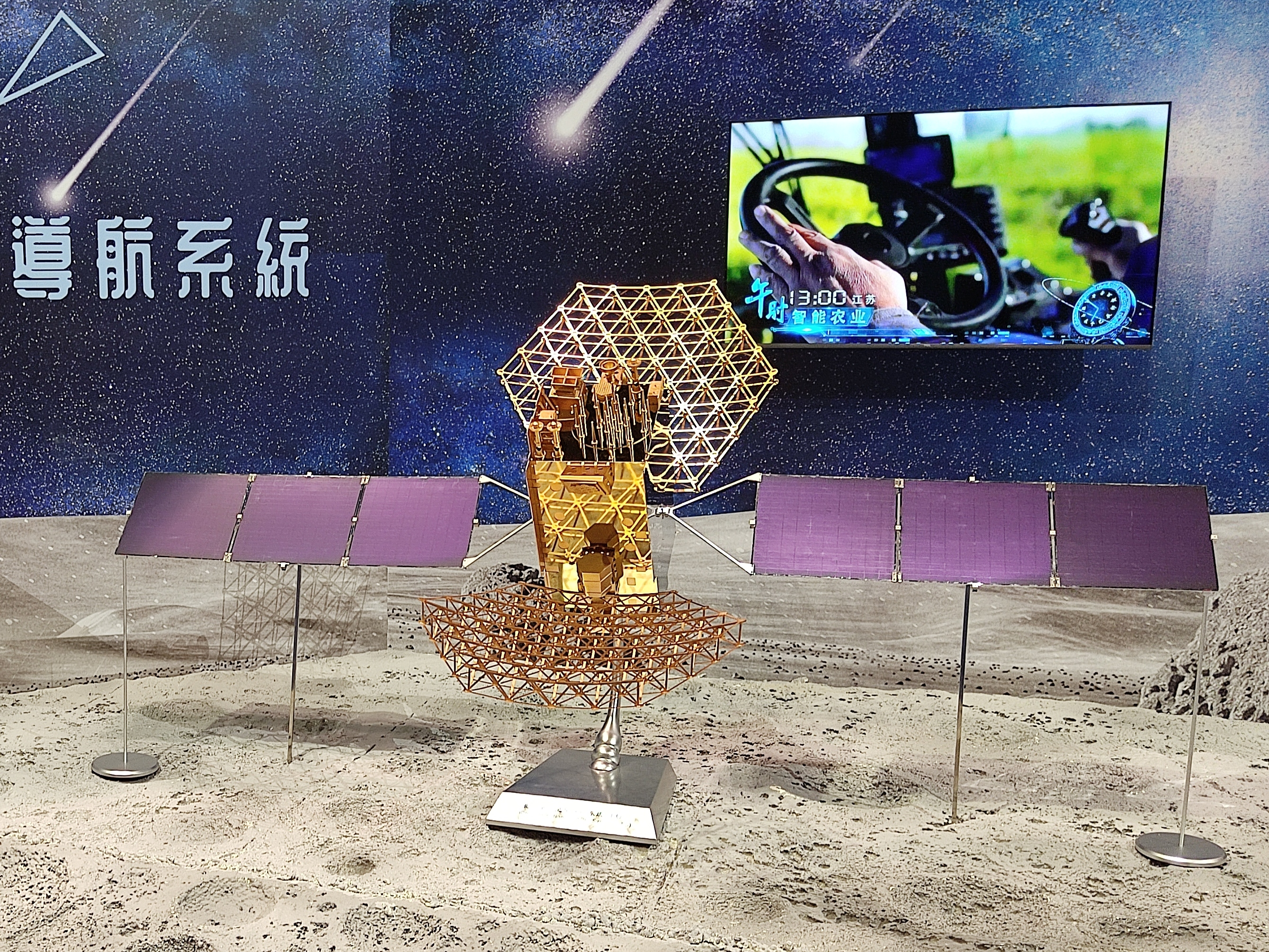
From left to right: Mockups of Beidou-3 satellites operating in MEO, IGSO, and GEO

Characteristics of BeiDou-2/Compass and BeiDou-3 signals
BeiDou signal	B1I	B1Q	B1C	B1A	B2I	B2Q	B2a	B2b	B3I	B3Q	B3A
GIOVE/Compass signal	E2-I	E2-Q	E1-I	E1-Q	E5B-I	E5B-Q	E5a	E5b	E6-I	E6-Q	–
Access type	Open	Authorized	Open	Authorized	Open	Authorized	Open	Open	Open	Authorized	Authorized
Code modulation	BPSK(2)	BPSK(2)	MBOC(6,1,1/11)	BOC(14,2)	BPSK(2)	BPSK(10)	AltBOC(15,10)	AltBOC(15,10)	BPSK(10)	BPSK(10)	BOC(15,2.5)
Carrier frequency (MHz)	1561.098	1561.098	1575.42	1575.42	1207.14	1207.14	1176.45	1207.14	1268.52	1268.52	1268.52
Chip rate (Mchips/s)	2.046	2.046			2.046	10.230			10.230	10.230	
Code period (chips)	2046	?			2046	??			10230	?	
Code period (ms)	1.0	>400			1.0	>160			1.0	>160	
Symbols rate (bits/s)	50	?			50	?			50	?	
Navigation frames (s)	6	?			6	?			?	?	
Navigation sub-frames (s)	30	?			30	?			?	?	
Navigation period (min)	12.0	?			12.0	?			?	?	

Characteristics of the "I" signals on E2 and E5B are generally similar to the civilian codes of GPS (L1-CA and L2C), but Compass signals have somewhat greater power. The notation of Compass signals used in this page follows the naming of the frequency bands and agrees with the notation used in the American literature on the subject, but the notation used by the Chinese seems to be different.

There has also been an experimental S band broadcast called "Bs" at 2492.028 MHz, following similar experiments on BeiDou-1.

As of early 2022, China had 49 operational positioning, navigation, and timing satellites to provide coverage through the Beidou system.

== Predecessors ==
=== BeiDou-1 ===
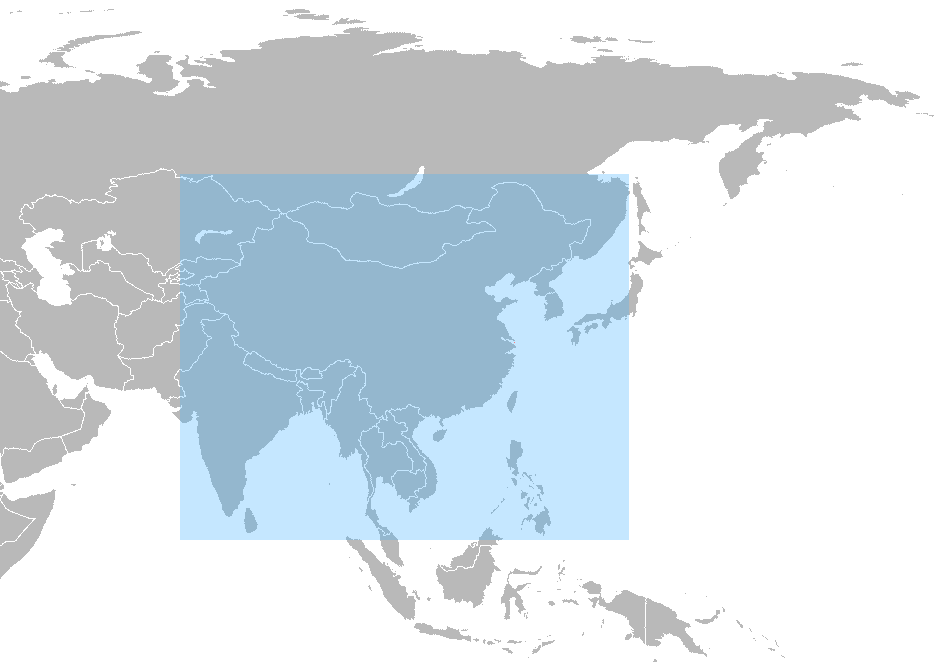
Coverage polygon of BeiDou-1

BeiDou-1 was an experimental regional navigation system, which consisted of four satellites (three working satellites and one backup satellite). The satellites themselves were based on the Chinese DFH-3 geostationary communications satellite and had a launch weight of 1,000 kg each.

Unlike the American GPS, Russian GLONASS, and European Galileo systems, which use medium Earth orbit satellites, BeiDou-1 used satellites in geostationary orbit. This means that the system does not require a large constellation of satellites, but it also limits the coverage to areas on Earth where the satellites are visible. The area that can be serviced is from longitude 70° E to 140° E and from latitude 5° N to 55° N. The frequency of the system is 2,491.75 MHz.

==== Completion ====
The first satellite, BeiDou-1A, was launched on 31 October 2000. The second satellite, BeiDou-1B, was successfully launched on 21 December 2000. The last operational satellite of the constellation, BeiDou-1C, was launched on 25 May 2003.

==== Position calculation ====
In 2007, the official Xinhua News Agency reported that the resolution of the BeiDou system was as high as 0.5 metre. With the existing user terminals it appears that the calibrated accuracy is 20 m (100 m, uncalibrated).

==== Terminals ====
In 2008, a BeiDou-1 ground terminal cost around CN¥ 20,000 (US$2,929), almost 10 times the price of a contemporary GPS terminal. The price of the terminals was explained as being due to the cost of imported microchips. At the China High-Tech Fair ELEXCON of November 2009 in Shenzhen, a BeiDou terminal priced at CN¥ 3,000 was presented.

==== Applications ====
- Over 1000 BeiDou-1 terminals were used after the 2008 Sichuan earthquake, providing information from the disaster area.
- As of October 2009, all Chinese border guards in Yunnan were equipped with BeiDou-1 devices.

Sun Jiadong, the chief designer of the navigation system, said in 2010 that "Many organizations have been using our system for a while, and they like it very much".

==== Decommissioning ====
BeiDou-1 was decommissioned at the end of 2012, after the BeiDou-2 system became operational.

=== BeiDou-2 ===
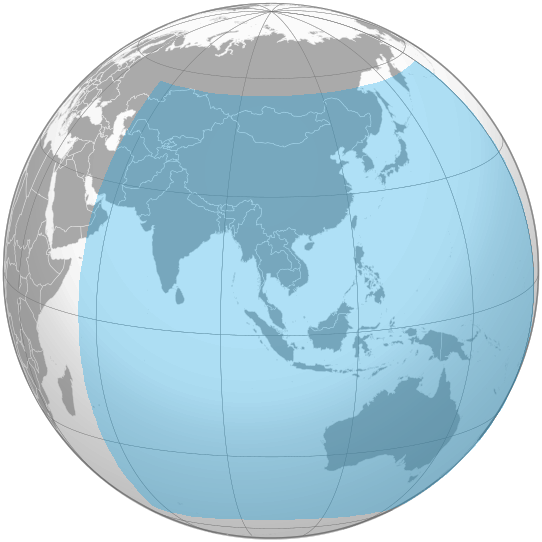
Coverage polygon of BeiDou-2 in 2012

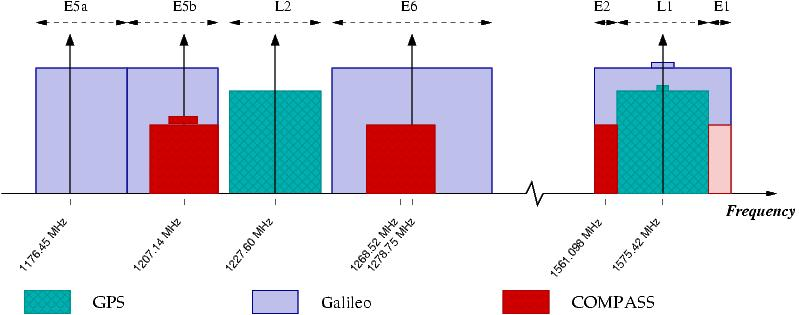
Frequency allocation of GPS, Galileo, and COMPASS; the light red color of E1 band indicates that the transmission in this band has not yet been detected.

BeiDou-2 (formerly known as COMPASS) is not an extension to the older BeiDou-1, but rather supersedes it outright. The new system is a constellation of 35 satellites, which include 5 geostationary orbit satellites for backward compatibility with BeiDou-1, and 30 non-geostationary satellites (27 in medium Earth orbit and 3 in inclined geosynchronous orbit), that offer complete coverage of the globe.

The ranging signals are based on the CDMA principle and have complex structure typical of Galileo or modernized GPS. Similar to the other global navigation satellite systems (GNSSs), there are two levels of positioning service: open (public) and restricted (military). The public service is available globally to general users. When all the currently planned GNSSs are deployed, users of multi-constellation receivers will benefit from a total over 100 satellites, which will significantly improve all aspects of positioning, especially availability of the signals in so-called urban canyons. The general designer of the COMPASS navigation system is Sun Jiadong, who is also the general designer of its predecessor, the original BeiDou navigation system. All BeiDou satellites are equipped with laser retroreflector arrays for satellite laser ranging and the verification of the orbit quality.

==== Accuracy ====
There are two levels of service provided, a free service to civilians and licensed service to the Chinese government and military. The free civilian service has a 10-metre location-tracking accuracy, synchronizes clocks with an accuracy to within 10 nanoseconds, and measures speeds to within 0.2 m/s. The restricted military service has a location accuracy to within 10 cm, can be used for communication, and will supply information about the system status to the user. In 2019, the International GNSS Service started providing precise orbits of BeiDou satellites in experimental products.

To date, the military service has been granted only to the People's Liberation Army and to the Pakistan Armed Forces.

==== Frequencies ====
Frequencies for COMPASS are allocated in four bands: E1, E2, E5B, and E6; they overlap with Galileo. The fact of overlapping could be convenient from the point of view of the receiver design, but on the other hand raises the issues of system interference, especially within E1 and E2 bands, which are allocated for Galileo's publicly regulated service. However, under International Telecommunication Union (ITU) policies, the first nation to start broadcasting in a specific frequency will have priority to that frequency, and any subsequent users will be required to obtain permission prior to using that frequency, and otherwise ensure that their broadcasts do not interfere with the original nation's broadcasts. As of 2009, it appeared that Chinese COMPASS satellites would start transmitting in the E1, E2, E5B, and E6 bands before Europe's Galileo satellites and thus have primary rights to these frequency ranges.

==== Compass-M1 ====
Compass-M1 is an experimental satellite launched for signal testing and validation and for the frequency filing on 14 April 2007. The role of Compass-M1 for Compass is similar to the role of the GIOVE satellites for the Galileo system. The orbit of Compass-M1 is nearly circular, has an altitude of 21,150 km and an inclination of 55.5°.

The investigation of the transmitted signals started immediately after the launch of Compass-M1 on 14 April 2007. Soon after in June 2007, engineers at CNES reported the spectrum and structure of the signals. A month later, researchers from Stanford University reported the complete decoding of the "I" signals components. The knowledge of the codes allowed a group of engineers at Septentrio to build the COMPASS receiver and report tracking and multipath characteristics of the "I" signals on E2 and E5B.

==== Operation ====
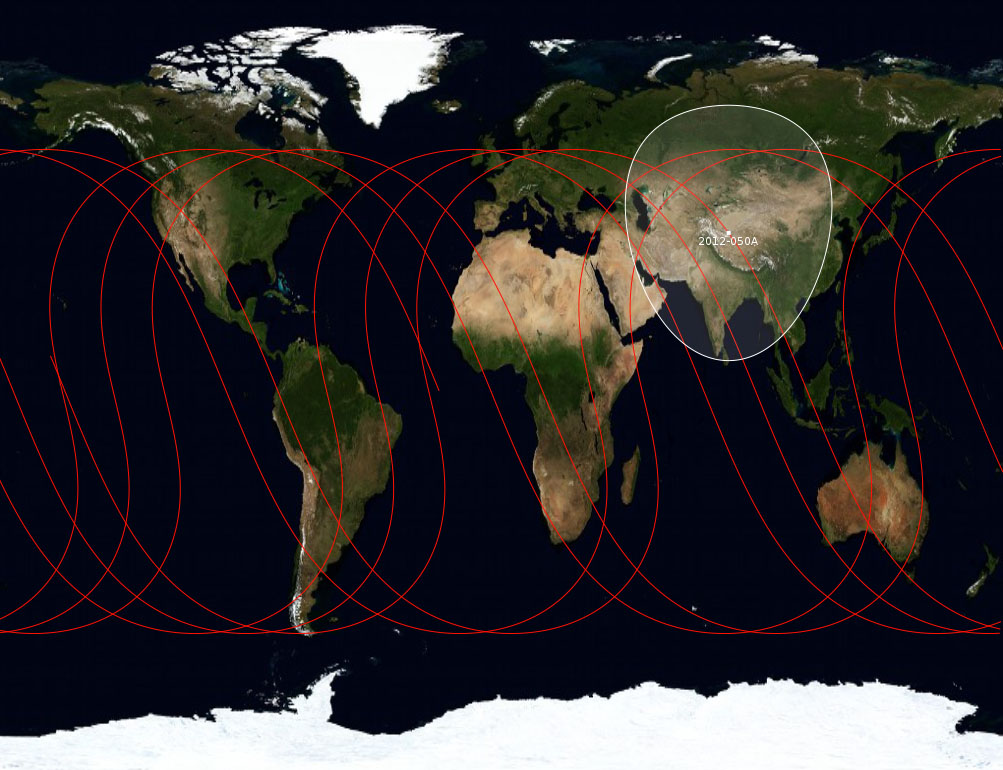
Ground track of BeiDou-M5 (2012-050A)

In December 2011, the system went into operation on a trial basis. It started providing navigation, positioning and timing data to China and the neighbouring area for free from 27 December 2011. During this trial run, Compass offered positioning accuracy to within 25 metres and the precision improved as more satellites were launched. Upon the system's official launch, it pledged to offer general users positioning information accurate to the nearest 10 m, measure speeds within 0.2 metres per second, and provide signals for clock synchronisation accurate to 0.02 microseconds.

The BeiDou-2 system began offering services for the Asia-Pacific region in December 2012. At this time, the system could provide positioning data between longitude 55° E to 180° E and from latitude 55° S to 55° N.

The new-generation BeiDou satellites support short message service.

==== Completion ====
In December 2011, Xinhua stated that "[t]he basic structure of the BeiDou system has now been established, and engineers are now conducting comprehensive system test and evaluation. The system will provide test-run services of positioning, navigation and time for China and the neighboring areas before the end of this year, according to the authorities". The system became operational in the China region that same month. The global navigation system should be finished by 2020.

As of December 2012, 16 satellites for BeiDou-2 had been launched, with 14 in service. As of December 2017, 150 million Chinese smartphones (20% of the market) were equipped to utilize BeiDou.

== Constellations ==
Summary of satellites, as of 19 Sep 2024
Block	Launch period	Satellite launches			Currently in orbit and healthy
Block	Launch period	Success	Failure	Planned	Currently in orbit and healthy
1	2000–2006	4	0	0	0
2	2007–2019	20	0	0	15
3	2015–present	40	0	0	35
Total		64	0	0	50

The regional BeiDou-1 system was decommissioned at the end of 2012.

The first satellite of the second-generation system, Compass-M1 was launched in 2007. It was followed by further nine satellites during 2009–2011, achieving functional regional coverage. A total of 16 satellites were launched during this phase.

In 2015, the system began its transition towards global coverage with the first launch of a new-generation of satellites, and the 17th one within the new system. On 25 July 2015, the 18th and 19th satellites were successfully launched from the Xichang Satellite Launch Center, marking the first time for China to launch two satellites at once on top of a Long March 3B/Yuanzheng-1 carrier rocket. The Yuanzheng-1 is an independent upper stage capable of delivering one or more spacecraft into different orbits. On 29 September 2015, the 20th satellite was launched, carrying a hydrogen maser for the first time within the system.

In 2016, the 21st, 22nd and 23rd satellites were launched from Xichang Satellite Launch Center, the last two of which entered into service on 5 August and 30 November, respectively.

Orbital period: 12 hours and 53 minutes (every 13 revolutions, done in 7 sidereal days, a satellite passes over the same location).

Animation of BeiDou-3

Around the Earth

Around the Earth – polar view

Earth fixed frame – equatorial view, front

Earth fixed frame – equatorial view, side

Earth · I1 · I2 · I3 · G1 · G2 · G3

== Concerns and prohibitions ==
Concerns have been raised by Taiwan's Ministry of Science and Technology about the possibility of embedded malware in BeiDou-enabled hardware and software. In 2018, Taiwan's National Communications Commission announced that it would be illegal to use BeiDou products in Taiwan without its approval.

== See also ==
- Chinese coordinate systems
- Tiantong

=== Other systems ===
- Galileo – global navigation satellite system operated by the European Union.
- GLONASS – global navigation satellite system operated by Russia.
- GPS – global navigation satellite system operated by the United States.
- NavIC – regional navigation satellite system operated by India, receivable in the South Asia and Western Asia regions.
- QZSS – regional navigation satellite system operated by Japan, receivable in the Asia-Oceania region.
