= List of ships named USS Monitor =

Two ships of the United States Navy have been named USS Monitor. The name means "a person or thing that warns or instructs"; it was suggested by the engineer John Ericsson who hoped that his warship — the first Monitor — would admonish the Confederate States of America and the United Kingdom which was then sympathetic to the Confederacy.

- USS Monitor, launched in 1862, was a revolutionary ironclad warship that gave its name to the monitor warship type. She served in the American Civil War and fought in the battle of Hampton Roads on 1862-03-09. She was lost at sea on 1862-12-31.
- USS Monitor (LSV-5), launched in 1941, was a landing ship that served in World War II, landing troops and equipment on Luzon and Okinawa.
