= GMV (company) =

Spanish private capital business group

- Industry: High Technology
- Headquarters: Tres Cantos
- Key people: Mónica Martínez Walter (President); Jesús B. Serrano (CEO)
- Revenue: 510,250,000 (2025)
- Net income: 24,550,000 (2025)
- Number of employees: +4.000

GMV, founded in 1984, is a Spanish private capital business group with an international presence and more than 4000 workers. In its early days, it focused on the space and defense sectors, being the contract for the European Space Operations Centre (ESOC) the beginning of its growth. Over the years it has diversified its operations and expanded into other fields becoming today's technology group, which comprises 11 areas of specialization: Space, Aeronautics, Defense and Security, Intelligent Transportation Systems (ITS), Automotive, Cybersecurity, Healthcare, and Digital Public Services, Industry, Financial sector, and Services.

GMV has offices in 12 countries and clients in nearly 80. It has CMMI level 5, the highest level of this maturity model for improving the capacity of software development processes.

== History ==
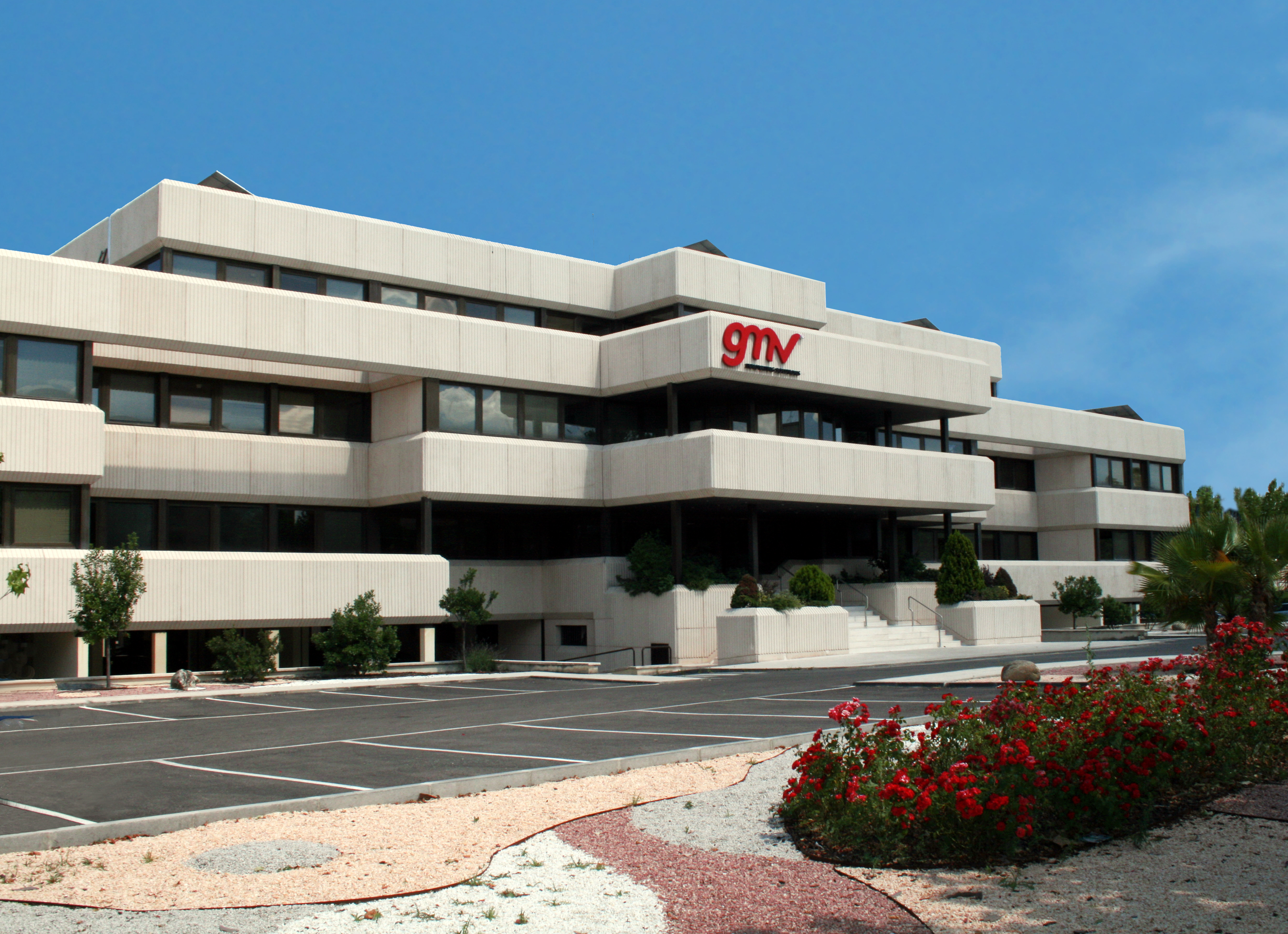
GMV's headquarters in Tres Cantos, Spain

Founded in 1984 by Juan José Martínez García, GMV began operations in the field of space when it won its first contract with the European Space Agency Operation Center (ESOC) from the European Space Agency.

In the early nineties GMV expanded its activity and began to offer services in the areas of transport, defense, telecommunications, and information technologies, in fields that were just starting up at that time, such as the internet and satellite navigation applications. In the year 2000, it joined the European consortium Galileo Industries S.A. to support the development and use of the Galileo European satellite navigation system. In 2001, the company changed direction, with Dr. Mónica Martínez Walter becoming the CEO.

In 2004, the first subsidiary outside of Spain was established in the United States to cover aerospace operations in the American market. It continued expanding in 2007 with the acquisition of the Portuguese company Skysoft. The most significant expansion was from 2009 to 2014 when a regional office in Malaysia and subsidiaries in Germany, Poland, Romania, France, Colombia, and the UK opened. From 2015 to 2018, it continued expanding its international presence with the acquisition of INSYEN AG in Germany and the company Syncromatics Corp in the US, both of which are currently operating under the GMV brand, in addition to also investing in the Spanish startup PLD Space.

At the end of 2018 it won the contract award to maintain and upgrade Galileo's Ground Control Segment, making it the largest contract signed by the Spanish space industry to date. In 2020 GMV acquired the British company Nottingham Scientific Limited (NSL), merging it with its own British subsidiary (GMV Innovating Solutions Limited) creating the company GMV NSL, which in 2022 began to operate under the GMV brand, along with the other subsidiaries.

In 2022, GMV signed an agreement with Lockheed Martin to develop the Southern Positioning Augmentation Network (SouthPAN) system, which was a joint initiative of the Australian and New Zealand governments to provide satellite navigation and positioning services in both countries. It also won a contract that year to provide the ground flight control computer for the Eurodrone program.

In 2023, GMV was selected by the European Space Agency (ESA) to develop the Galileo Second Generation System Test Bed (G2STB). It also secured a contract to develop the ground segment responsible for in-orbit control and validation of the Galileo Second Generation (G2G). The year also saw the integration of Alén Space, a NewSpace start-up, into the GMV group.

In 2023, having achieved the objectives of its investment in PLD, GMV withdrew from the company.

During 2024 and 2025, GMV strengthened its presence in European programs and international markets through a range of initiatives. In September 2024, the European Union Agency for the Space Programme (EUSPA) awarded GMV leadership of a consortium to design, develop, and deploy the Communications Hub for the GOVSATCOM program, the European Union’s governmental satellite communications program. In the field of defense, the company acquired the Spanish firm Autek, which specializes in cross-domain solutions for the secure exchange of information. GMV also participated in six projects selected under the 2024 call of the European Defence Fund.

At the end of 2025, the company established an alliance with LuxQuanta to develop quantum key distribution (QKD) technologies applied to secure communications. That same period also included a visit by His Majesty King Felipe VI to GMV’s facilities on the occasion of its 40th anniversary, providing institutional visibility to its activities in sectors such as space, defense, cybersecurity and intelligent transportation systems.

As a declaration of its commitment to sustainable development based on innovation for progress, GMV is part of the United Nations Global Compact, the main international initiative that promotes sustainability and corporate responsibility

== Areas of activity ==
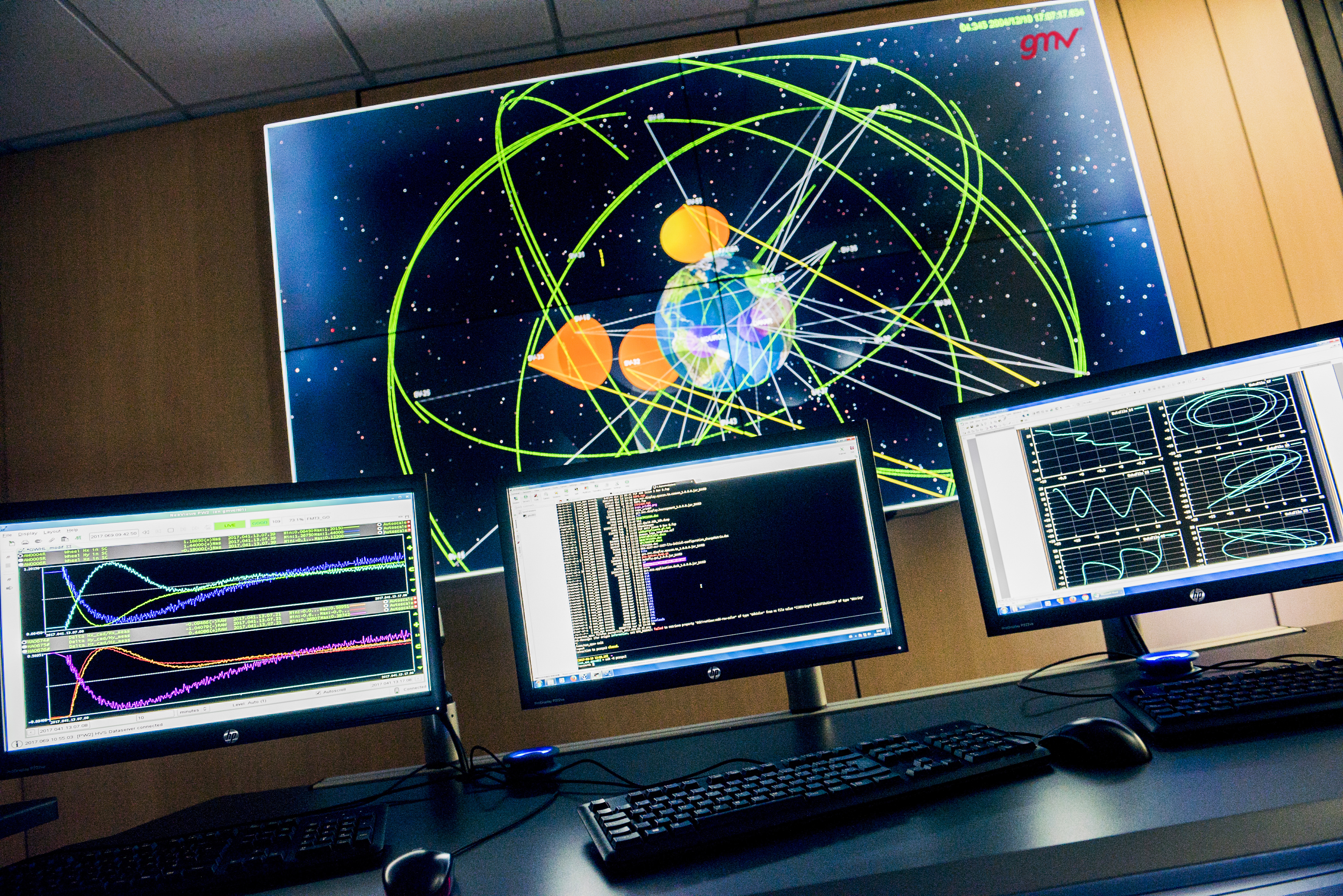
GMV Mission control center

GMV operates mainly in the following sectors:

- Aeronautics
- Automotive
- Banking and Insurance
- Cybersecurity
- Defense and security
- Health care
- ICT for Business
- Intelligent Transportation Systems
- Public Administration
- Space
- Telecommunications

== GMV around the world ==
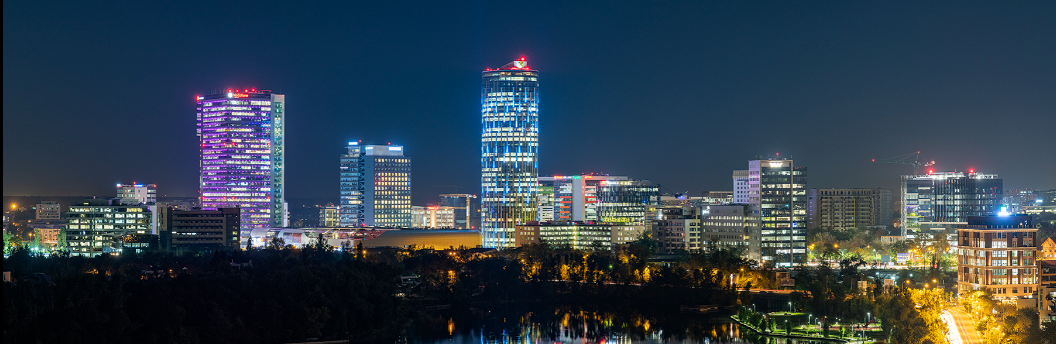
Sky Tower (center), Romania's tallest building and location of GMV in the country

GMV is present in the following cities and countries:

- Spain
  - Madrid: Tres Cantos (head offices)
  - Valladolid: Boecillo
  - Seville
  - Barcelona: L'Ametlla del Vallès and L'Hospitalet de Llobregat
  - Valencia
  - Zaragoza
- Portugal
  - Lisbon
- United States
  - Rockville, Maryland
  - Los Angeles, California
  - Houston, Texas
- Poland
  - Warsaw
- Germany
  - Darmstadt
  - Weßling
  - Gilching
- United Kingdom
  - Didcot
  - Nottingham
- France
  - Toulouse
- Romania
  - Bucharest
- Belgium
  - Brussels
- Malaysia
  - Kuala Lumpur
- Colombia
  - Bogotá
- Netherlands
  - Amsterdam

== World Bank sanction ==
In March 2021, GMV's subsidiary, Grupo Mecánica del Vuelo Sistemas S.A.U., was debarred by the World Bank for three and a half years in connection with collusive, corrupt and fraudulent practices, as defined by the World Bank's Sanctions Procedures, related to a sustainable urban development project (in Danang, Vietnam) and the Hanoi Urban Transport Development Project, also in Vietnam. This decision made Grupo Mecánica del Vuelo Sistemas S.A.U. ineligible to participate in projects financed by institutions of the World Bank Group until September 2024. Grupo Mecánica del Vuelo Sistemas S.A.U. agreed to meet specific compliance requirements as a condition for release from debarment.

In September 2024, the World Bank lifted the sanction, certifying that Grupo Mecánica del Vuelo Sistemas S.A.U. had met all the conditions for release from the debarment outlined in the agreement between both parties. This now allows Grupo Mecánica del Vuelo Sistemas S.A.U. to participate once again in projects financed by World Bank Group institutions.
