= INavsat consortium =

The iNavsat consortium was a group of European companies that came together in 2004 to bid on a contract with Galileo Joint Undertaking (GJU) to run the Galileo positioning system. The group consisted of Thales, EADS and Inmarsat. In May 2005 iNavsat and its competitor Eurely consortium came up with a joint bid that eventually won the contract. After the GJU was replaced in 2006 by the European GNSS Supervisory Authority (GSA), some of the companies of INavsat and Eurely consortium regrouped into Galileo Industries, later called European Satellite Navigation Industries, to work for the Galileo project.
