= Galilean faith =

Ancient term used to refer to Christianity

The Galilean faith, also spelled Galilaean faith, is a term used by some people of the ancient world, most notably emperor Julian (r. 361–363), to designate Christianity. The town of Nazareth (the place of Jesus' childhood) is located in Galilee, as is Capernaum, the town where he lived during much of his ministry. Jesus' followers were thus called Galileans. Galilee was part of the province of Judea. The reason for this term was to marginalize Christianity and to indicate that it came from a small area, a religion of only local significance.

In the same manner, Jesus was called "of Nazareth" or "the Nazarene" in this context (another emphasis on geographical origin and the indication of local significance) instead of "Christ" (derived from the Greek word for "anointed").

These terms were used as part of the ideological struggle against the new religion, which was perceived as a threat. Over time, the originally factual designation absorbed a pejorative meaning, which, despite its expansion throughout the Roman Empire, still referred to it as a local religion.

The terms appeared in several texts that in ways contradicted the different aspects of the new religion and pointed out either theological errors, contradictions, or an overall misconception of the faith. The use of these terms in late antiquity was generally meant to weaken the religion, gaining an advantage just by the naming, before making any arguments.

Stoic philosopher Epictetus uses the term Galilean in his Discourses (c. 108 AD):

And is it possible that any one should be thus disposed towards these things from madness, and the Galileans from mere habit; yet that no one should be able to learn, from reason and demonstration, that God made all things in the world, and made the whole world itself unrestrained and perfect, and all its parts for the use of the whole?

== See also ==
- Early Christianity
- Jewish Christianity
- Julian the Apostate
  - Against the Galileans, polemical essay by Julian
  - Emperor and Galilean, play by Ibsen
