= Galilean =

Inhabitant of ancient Galilee

Galileans
גלילאאה (In Jewish Aramaic)
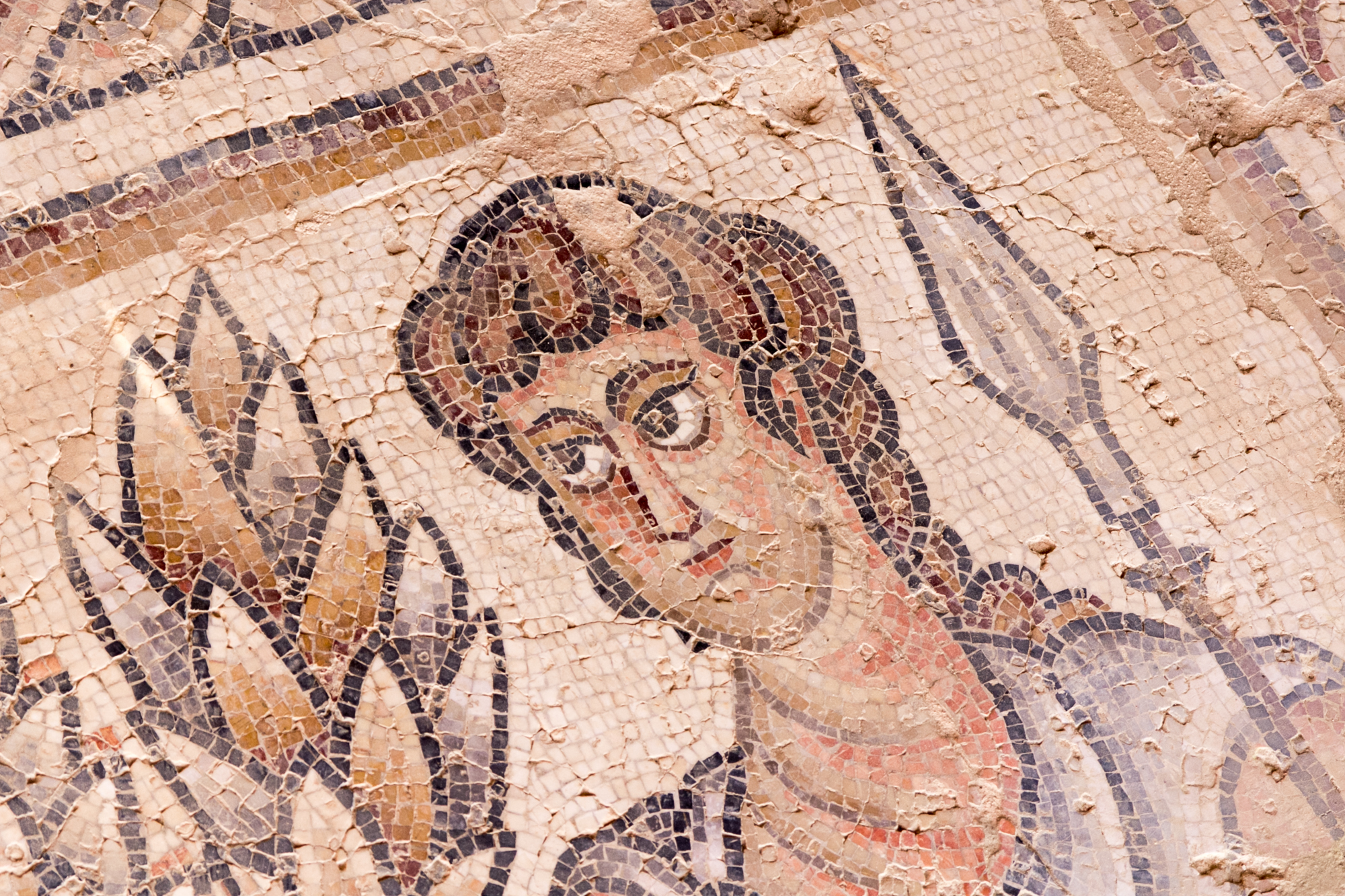
- Mosaic from the 'Nile House' of Sepphoris, c. 2nd century CE.

Languages
- Galilean Aramaic; Phoenician

Religion
- Judaism (Second Temple, Synagogal, and Rabbinic); Jewish Christianity; other forms of Early Christianity (see term "Galilean faith"); Paganism (Canaanite, Roman)

Related ethnic groups
- Tyrians (Phoenician) · Itureans · Jews · Edomites

Generically, a Galilean (/ɡælɪˈliːən/; Hebrew: גלילי; Ancient Greek: Γαλιλαίων; Latin: Galilaeos) is a term that was used in classical sources to describe the inhabitants of Galilee, a region today in northern Israel and much of southern Lebanon, that extends from the Mediterranean with the coastal plain in the west, to the Jordan Rift Valley with the Hulah Valley and the Sea of Galilee in the east. Initially the majority of them were Jews.

Later the term was used to refer to the early Christians by Roman emperors Marcus Aurelius (r. 161-180) and Julian (r. 361-363), among others.

Markus Cromhout describes first-century Galileans as descendants of Hasmonean-era Judean immigrants. However, they identified by various identities, such as Galilean, Sepphorean and more broadly, Judean or Israelite. Whilst they all adhered to a 'common Judaism', Galileans 'had a different social, economic and political matrix than Jews living in Judea or the Diaspora'. Other scholars disagree and attribute the conflation between Galileans and Judeans to Hellenistic-Roman culture, which grouped all first-century Jewish groups, and their related diasporas, as "Judean".

== History ==
=== Biblical narrative ===
According to the Biblical narrative in the Book of Joshua, the Galilee was allotted to the tribes of Naphtali and Dan, at points overlapping with the domain of the Tribe of Asher and neighboring the region of Issachar. The First Book of Kings claims that the Phoenician ruler King Hiram I of Sidon was awarded twenty cities in the region of Galilee, given to him by Solomon, and the land was subsequently settled by foreigners during or after the time of Hiram. As part of the Northern Kingdom, Galilee and all the land of Naphtali were dispersed and resettled through the influx of foreigners due to the resettlement policy of the Neo-Assyrian Empire during the 8th century BC (2 Kings 15:29). The Book of Isaiah refers to the region as g'lil ha-goyím (Hebrew: גְּלִיל הַגּוֹיִם), meaning 'Galilee of the Nations' or 'Galilee of the Gentiles' (Isaiah 9:1).

Though Biblical scholarship and historical criticism has doubted the historicity of the twelve tribes themselves since the 19th century, the Neo-Assyrian large-scale deportation and resettlement of their conquered lands was widespread during the late 8th century BCE and remained a policy for the following several centuries.

=== Classical antiquity ===
The region of Galilee was under-populated during the Persian period. The resettlement of the area began with the establishment of cities along the coastal plain by Phoenicians from Tyre. Steadily, the coastal inhabitants built inland rural settlements for their agricultural needs, and inland fortresses for protection of caravan routes and administrative control of the hinterland, launching a new era of occupation in Galilee. With this increase in basic safety measures, people migrated into the region, and autochthonous populations expanded. The region was also inhabited by Itureans, especially in the north.

The Galileans were conscious of a mutual descent, religion and ethnicity and viewed themselves as both close to and distinct from Jews. There were numerous cultural differences, and later rabbinic literature affirms traditions that Judaic religious life in Galilee was distinct from that in Judaea due to being influenced by the native Phoenician faith. John Elliott argues that only outsiders, like Romans, confused the Galileans with Judeans.

The Pharisaic scholars of Judaism, centered in Jerusalem and Judaea, found the Galilean converts to Judaism to be insufficiently concerned about the details of Jewish observance – for example, the rules of Sabbath rest. The Pharisaic criticism of Galilean converts is mirrored in the New Testament, in which Galilean righteous zeal is compared favorably against the minute concerns of Judaean legal scholars, see for example Woes of the Pharisees. This was the heart of a "crosstown" rivalry existing between Galileans and Judaic Pharisees.

Rabbi Yohanan ben Zakkai was born in Arav, Galilee, but upon adulthood moved south into Jerusalem, as he found the Galilean attitude objectionable, decrying them for hating the Torah. According to the Mishnah, Yohanan was the first to be given the title of rabbi. The Talmud says that Yohanan was assigned to a post in the Galilee during his training. In eighteen years he was asked only two questions of Judaic walk of life, causing him to lament "O Galilee, O Galilee, in the end you shall be filled with wrongdoers!" In his analysis of the biblical narrative of Jesus's crucifixion, Markus Cromhout proposes that the Romans intentionally offended the Judeans by crucifying Jesus as 'the King of Judeans', despite being Galiean.

Archaeological evidence, such as ritual baths, stone vessels (which were required by Judaic dietary purity laws), secondary burials, the absence of pig bones, and the use of ossuaries found at Parod, Huqoq, and Hittin, demonstrates a religious similarity between the Galileans Jews and Judaean Jews during the end of the Second Temple period. The material culture of the 1st century Galilee indicates adherence to the Judaic ritual purity concerns. Stone vessels are ubiquitous and mikvehs have been uncovered in most Galilean sites, particularly around synagogues and private houses.

Settlement in the area underwent a dramatic change between roughly the beginning of the first century BCE and the first half of the first century CE: many settlements were established; uninhabited or sparsely populated areas, like the eastern part of the region or hilly areas with limited agricultural potential, experienced a wave of settlement; and the size of the settled area doubled.

==== Bar Kokhba revolt ====
According to Yehoshafat Harkabi, the Galileans were not fazed by the Bar Kokhba revolt because Galilee as a whole either never joined the revolt or, if there was any insurgence, it was quickly ended. University of Haifa professor Menachem Mor states that the Galileans had little (if any) participation in the revolt, with the rebellion chiefly rising in the southern regions of Judaea.

=== Medieval and Modern periods ===
Records thought the centuries attest to Galilean presence in villages such as Kafr Yassif, Biriyya, and Alma, but no Jewish continuity in those was found in 19th and 20th century Palestine at the latest. The remaining centuries Galilean Jews had either underwent Arabization and sometimes Islamization, or joined the diaspora by the Ottoman period in Palestine. A few managed to stay on the land while maintaining Jewish identity, as seen in the village of Peki'in in Mandatory Palestine, whose presence is speculated to potentially go back to the Second Temple Period, suggesting its Jews had never left, but it is clear that the Jewish presence in the area diminished after the revolts of ancient times and the settlement of Roman, Greek, and Syrian populations.

== Dialect ==
The New Testament notes that the Apostle Peter's accent gave him away as a Galilean (Matthew 26:73 and Mark 14:70). The Galilean dialect referred to in the New Testament was a form of Western Aramaic spoken by people in Galilee from the late Second Temple period (1st century BCE to 1st century CE) through a time period referred to as the Yavne period in Jewish history and the Apostolic Age in Christian history (2nd century CE).

== Other meanings ==
"Galileans" was used to refer to members of a fanatical sect (Zealots), followers of Judas of Galilee, who fiercely resented the taxation of the Romans.

"Galileans" was also term used by some in the Roman Empire to name the followers of Christianity, called in this context as the Galilaean faith. Emperor Julian used the term in his polemic Against the Galileans, where he accuses the Galileans as being lazy, atheistic, superstitious, and their practices derivative of the Greeks. Henrik Ibsen used the term in his play Emperor and Galilean following Julian's goal of reestablishing the Roman religion and the tension between him and his own dynasty, who fictively claim Galilæan descent and relation to Jesus of Nazareth.

== See also ==
- Galilee
- Litani River, Galilee's geographic northern boundary
- Musta'arabi Jews § Galilee Revival
- Land of Israel (which Galilee is a part of)
- Syria Palaestina
