= Galileo Galilei (disambiguation) =

Galileo Galilei (1564–1642) was a scientist and philosopher.

Galileo Galilei may also refer to:

- Galileo Galilei (opera), an opera by Philip Glass
- Galileo Galilei (band)
- Italian submarine Galileo Galilei
- SS Galileo Galilei, a cruise liner
- Galileo Galilei International Airport
- Galileo Galilei planetarium
- Galileo Galilei Institute for Theoretical Physics, a research institute in Italy
- Galileo Galilei, a painting of Galileo by Peter Paul Rubens
- Galileo Galilei, a translation by Adalet Cimcoz of Bertolt Brecht's Life of Galileo

== See also ==
- Galileo (disambiguation)
