= Septentrio =

Belgian satellite navigation company

Septentrio N.V.
- Company type: Private
- Industry: GNSS
- Founded: 2000; 26 years ago
- Founder: Peter Grognard
- Headquarters: Leuven, Belgium
- Key people: Antoon De Proft, CEO
- Products: GNSS receivers
- Owner: Hexagon AB
- Number of employees: about 120
- Website: http://www.septentrio.com

Septentrio N.V. is a designer and manufacturer of high-end multi-frequency GNSS receivers. Its main target is to provide GNSS receiver boards and modules for further system integration by original equipment manufacturers (OEMs).

Its core technology is used in various professional fields such as land and airborne surveying, mobile mapping, machine control, precision agriculture, mining, transport, offshore applications, construction, timing and geodesy etc.

== History ==
The company was incorporated by Peter Grognard in Leuven, Belgium, in January 2000 to commercialize the Satellite Navigation know-how developed at the Interuniversity Micro Electronics Center, the largest independent microelectronics and nanotechnology R&D lab in Belgium.

In 2007 the firm received the Trends Gazelle award for the fastest rate of growth among Belgian start-up companies.

In January 2025, Hexagon AB announced that they would acquire Septentrio N.V. This transaction was completed two months later.

== Location ==
Septentrio's headquarters are located in Leuven, Belgium. Operations for North and Latin American are based in Torrance, CA and the Asian-Pacific operations are based in Shanghai and Yokohama.

== Activities ==
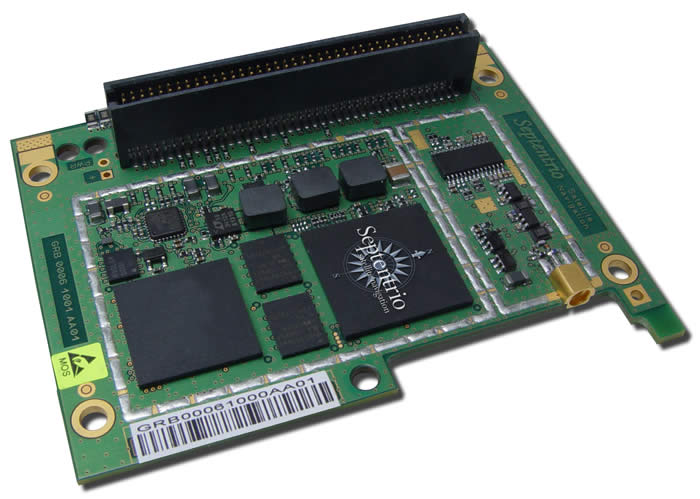
AsteRx1, first Galileo-compatible commercial receiver

Septentrio has an international team of experts, who cover all the fields of Satellite Navigation technology. The company designs its own chipsets, hardware, firmware and algorithms. Being a provider of high-end receivers for professional use, Septentrio prioritizes the reliability and precision of measurements as well as high degree of flexibility and user control. Septentrio’s products make use of APME, the company’s original multipath-mitigation technology, on-the-fly ambiguity fixing schemes based on the LAMBDA method, and advanced user-controlled RAIM algorithms. Septentrio is also known to first introduce single-board attitude determination systems based on the multi-antenna version of its GPS receivers.

Septentrio’s receivers were used to track experimental Galileo signals transmitted by the GIOVE-A satellite and were also the first to track the signals of the first experimental satellite of the future Chinese Compass navigation system. In the line of user products the company keeps its focus on multi-system receivers that make use of all the navigation signals available in the sky.
