= USS Montauk (LSV-6) =

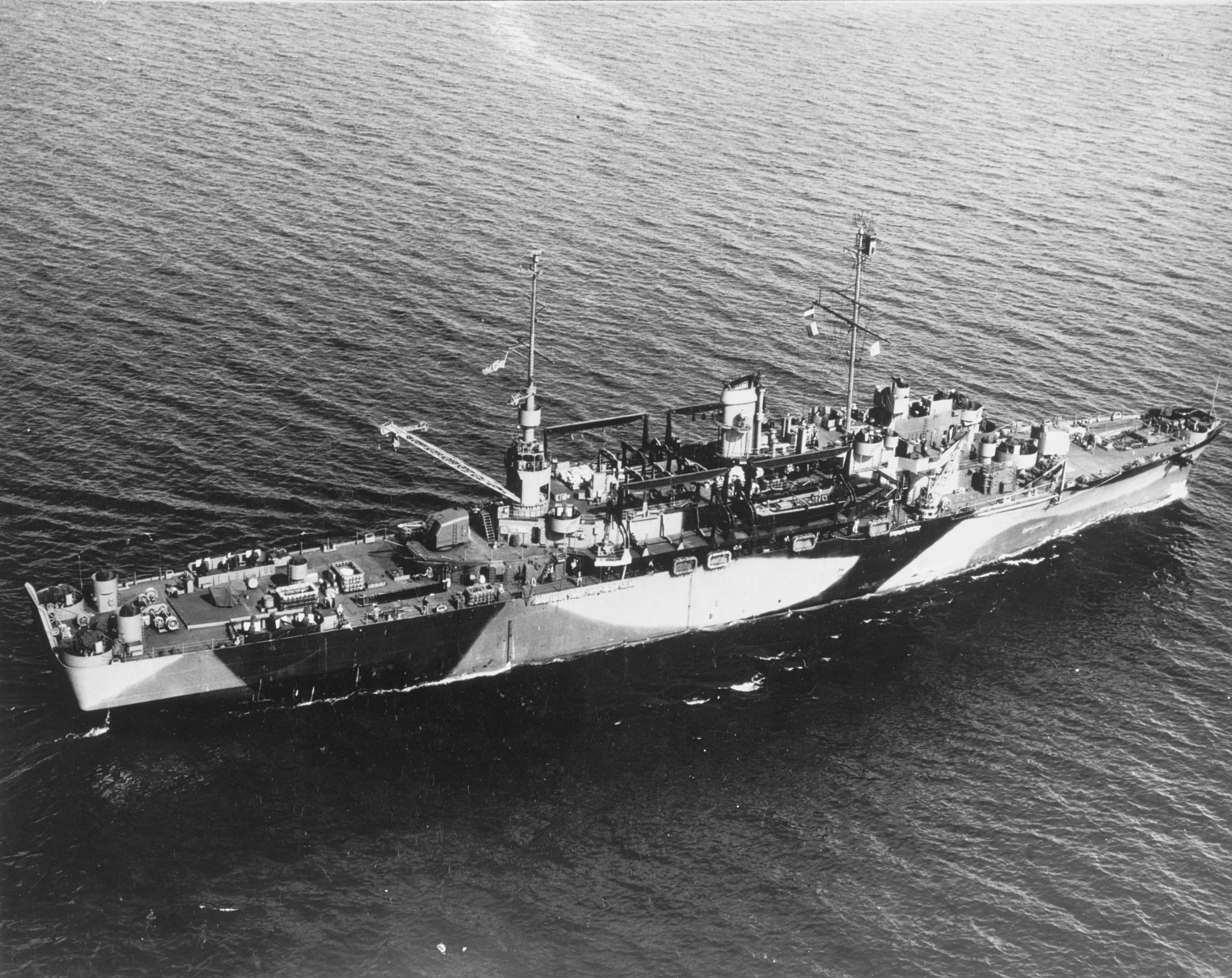
- USS Montauk underway off New York soon after completion of her LSV conversion in October 1944

History

United States
- Name: USS Montauk
- Builder: Ingalls Shipbuilding, Pascagoula, Mississippi
- Laid down: 14 April 1942, as AN-2 (Net laying ship)
- Launched: 14 April 1943
- Commissioned: 6 October 1944
- Decommissioned: July 1947
- Renamed: USS Galilea, 1 October 1946
- Reclassified: AP-161 (Transport), 2 August 1943; LSV-6 (Landing Ship Vehicle), 21 April 1944; AKN-6 (Net Cargo Ship), 1 October 1946
- Stricken: 1 September 1961
- Honours and awards: 1 battle star (World War II)
- Fate: Sold for scrapping, June 1972

General characteristics
- Class & type: Osage-class vehicle landing ship
- Displacement: 4,626 long tons (4,700 t) light; 9,040 long tons (9,185 t) full
- Length: 458 ft (140 m)
- Beam: 60 ft 2 in (18.34 m)
- Draft: 20 ft (6.1 m)
- Propulsion: 4 × Combustion Engineering 2-drum boilers; 2 × General Electric geared turbines; 2 shafts
- Speed: 21 knots (39 km/h; 24 mph)
- Capacity: 19 × LVTs or 29 × DUKWs
- Troops: 122 officers, 1236 enlisted men
- Complement: 458 officers and enlisted men
- Armament: 2 × single 5"/38 caliber gun mounts (forward); 1 × single 5"/38 caliber gun mount (aft); 4 × twin 40 mm guns; 20 × single 20 mm guns

USS Montauk (LSV-6/AN-2/AP-161/AKN-6) was an Osage-class vehicle landing ship built for the United States Navy during World War II. She was named after USS Montauk (1862) and was the fourth U.S. Naval vessel to bear the name.

Originally laid down under Maritime Commission contract (MC hull 1) as netlayer AN-2 on 14 April 1942 by the Ingalls Shipbuilding Corporation of Pascagoula, Mississippi; launched 14 April 1943; sponsored by Mrs. G. C. Whiting; reclassified AP-161 2 August 1943; reclassified LSV-6 21 April 1944; and commissioned 6 October 1944 at Brooklyn, New York.

== Service history ==
=== Pacific, 1944–1945 ===
After shakedown in Chesapeake Bay, Montauk joined TU 29.6.11 on 7 November 1944 and sailed for the west coast for assignment with Amphibious Forces, Pacific Fleet. Arriving at San Francisco on 23 November, she loaded DUKWs and LCVPs and headed for Hawaii on 25 November on her first vehicular cargo run. During the next few months, the delivery of similar cargoes took her to Guadalcanal, Tulagi, Eniwetok, and Guam as well as to Hawaii. On 2 March she took on Army troops and equipment, sailing on 5 March for Saipan. Then, as Allied forces in the Pacific gathered for the next campaign, she sailed west toward Okinawa.

=== Battle of Okinawa, 1945 ===
By 1 April she stood off the "demonstration" beach on the southeast coast of that largest of the Ryukyu Islands. There she participated in the diversionary feint to draw the enemy's attention from the Hagushi beaches, receiving within hours her first taste of Japanese kamikaze aerial resistance tactics, At 0704, she proceeded to Transport Area Easy off the west coast of Okinawa, rendezvousing with Eldorado, Vice Admiral Turner's flagship, at 1109, and commencing the employment of her boats in the shuttling of Army staff personnel to and from Eldorado. Her passengers and cargo, assigned to reinforcement roles, remained on board, intact, until 9 April. Emptied by 15 April, she set a course back to Saipan on 16 April. From Saipan, she made one run to the Palaus, and then headed back to San Francisco, whence she conducted amphibious supply runs to Hawaii, Eniwetok, Guam, and Ulithi through the remaining months of the war.

=== End of the war, 1945 ===
Following VJ Day, Montauk transported occupation troops to Okinawa and then sailed, 30 September, for Tientsin, China, with Marine Corps personnel and equipment. Departing 10 October she returned to the Ryukyus and then steamed on to Guam, where she embarked personnel of the 6th Marine Division for transportation to China, disembarking them at Qingdao, 28 November. At the end of the month, she proceeded to Sasebo, Japan and sailed from there on the 13th for Okinawa en route to San Diego.

=== Decommissioning and sale, 1945–1972 ===
Montauk returned to the United States 29 December and was reassigned to the Atlantic Fleet, homeported at Charleston, South Carolina. Renamed Galilea and redesignated AKN-6 on 1 October 1946 she began inactivation in December 1946. Decommissioned in July 1947 she entered the Atlantic Reserve Fleet at Charleston. She remained there as a unit of the 16th Fleet until placed in the custody of the Maritime Administration in August 1960. On 1 September 1961 she was struck from the Naval Vessel Register. The following year, she was formally transferred to the Commerce Department and was laid up in the James River as a unit of the National Defense Reserve Fleet. Galilea was sold for scrapping in June 1972.

Montauk received one battle star for her World War II service.

== See also ==
- Net laying ship § 1930s
