= Camp Galileo =

Summer camp

- Company type: Private
- Founded: 2002
- Founder: Glen Tripp
- Website: galileo-camps.com

Camp Galileo began as a Bay Area summer camp founded in Palo Alto, California, US, by CEO Glen Tripp in circa 2001. Everything that happens for campers is informed by the Galileo Innovation Approach (known as the “GIA”). Drawing heavily from the process by the Institute of Design at Stanford, Galileo runs a series of programs for kids.

Since its founding, Galileo has served more than 500,000 kids across the Bay Area, Southern California and Illinois with more than 70 locations. In 2012, Galileo became certified as a B-Corporation. In addition, the company founded its Innovation for All initiative which aims to provide full and partial scholarships to kids in the areas it serves who otherwise would not be able to attend camps.

In April 2020, Galileo was ranked as one of the 10 Bay Area Best Places to Work 2020, marking the organization's eleventh consecutive year on the list by the San Francisco and Silicon Valley Business Times.

Camp Galileo received criticism in June 2019 for allowing a 5-year-old child to walk away from camp unnoticed at one of its camps. The camp did not realize the child went missing until hours later when the parents of the child arrived for pickup.

Due to the global pandemic, Galileo was forced to cancel its traditional in-person camps scheduled for the spring and summer of 2020. Because of the COVID-19 epidemic, Camp Galileo filed for Chapter 11 bankruptcy in May 2020 to reorganize the company with plans to continue operating. The organization was unable to provide refunds to individuals who had already paid or submitted a deposit, stating "Camp is cancelled and we are not giving any refunds. Sorry, we don't have any money." Galileo at the time had $6 million in its accounts and they had a $2.5 million PPP loan.

Camp Galileo resumed summer camps in 2021 after emerging from Chapter 11 reorganization.
