= Galileo (supercomputer) =

Supercomputer in Italy

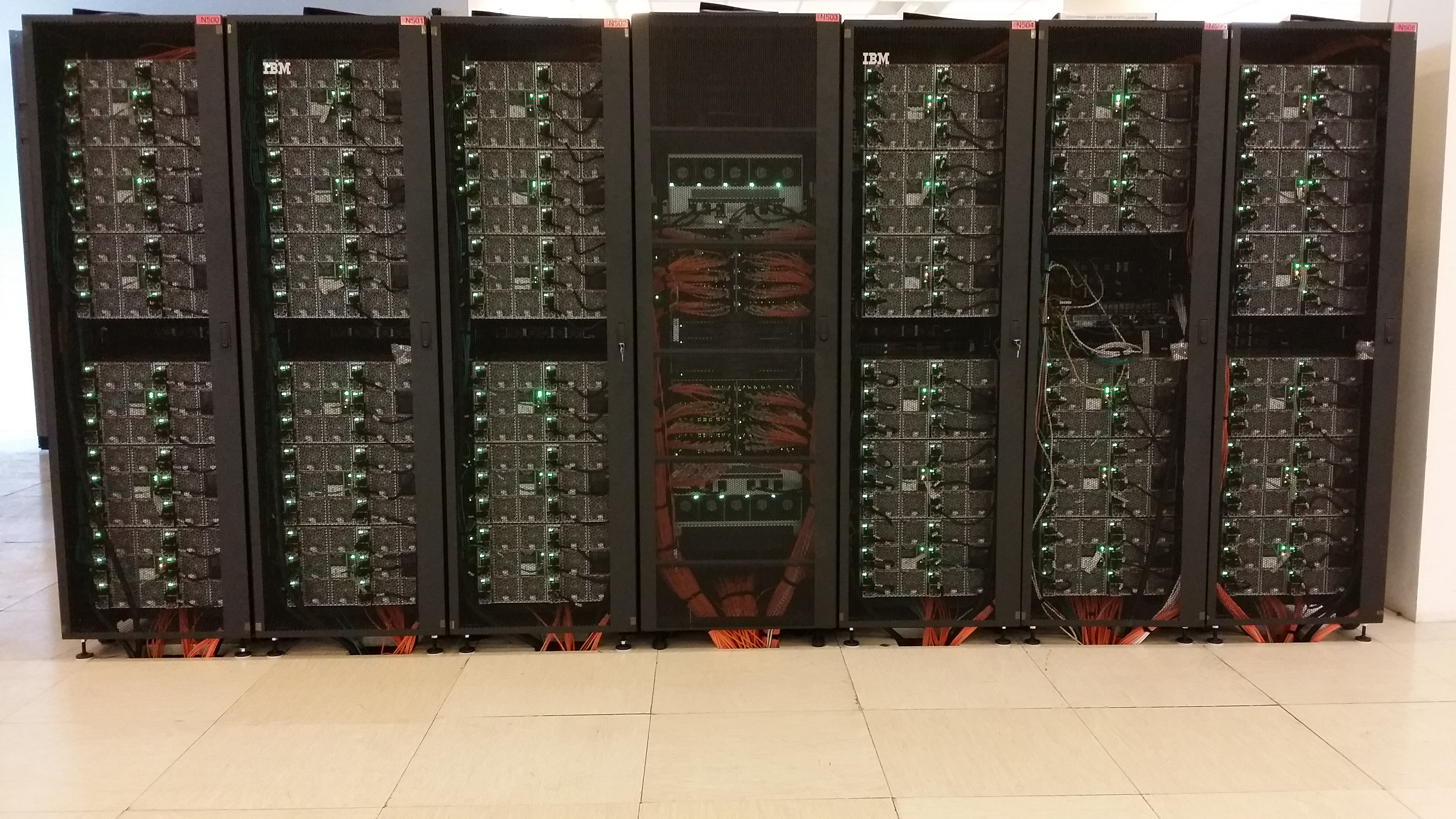
- Galileo IBM NeXtScale
- Active: operational 2015
- Sponsors: Ministry of Education, Universities and Research (Italy), Istituto Nazionale di Fisica Nucleare, University of Milano-Bicocca
- Operators: The Members of the Consortium
- Location: Cineca, Casalecchio di Reno, Italy
- Architecture: IBM NeXtScale; Infiniband with 4x QDR switches 2 8-cores Intel Haswell 2.40 GHz per node 16 cores/node,516 nodes, 8256 cores in total 2 Intel Phi 7120p per node on 384 nodes (768 in total); 2 NVIDIA K80 per node on 40 nodes (80 in total, 20 available for scientific research)
- Power: 2,825.55 KW
- Operating system: CentOS 7.0
- Memory: 128 GB/node, 8 GB/core; 46,592 GB
- Storage: 2.000 TB of local scratch
- Speed: 1,103.1 PFLOPS
- Ranking: TOP500: 130, 2015-11
- Purpose: computational fluid dynamics, material and life science, and geophysics
- Website: www.hpc.cineca.it/content/galileo

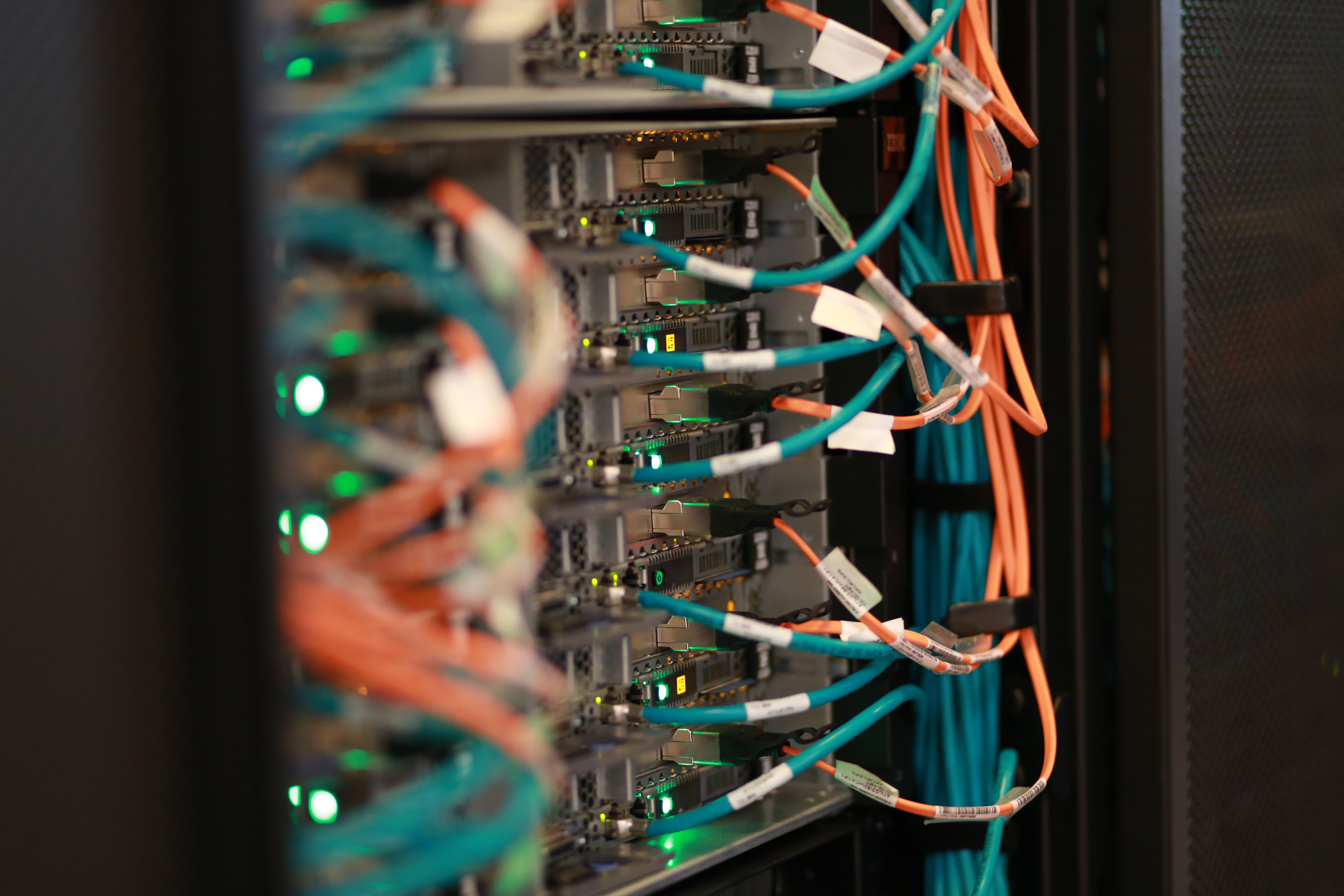
Wiring of Galileo supercomputer in Cineca

Galileo is a 1.1 petaFLOPS supercomputer located at CINECA in Bologna, Italy.

== History ==
GALILEO is available in Cineca since January 2015, in full production since February, the 2-nd, sponsored by the Ministry of Education, Universities and Research (Italy), the Istituto Nazionale di Fisica Nucleare and the University of Milano-Bicocca. It is the Italian National Tier-1 HPC machine, devoted to scientific computing as well as technical oriented applications. Galileo is also available to European researchers as a Tier-1 system of the PRACE infrastructure.

In June 2015, Galileo reached the 105-th position on the TOP500 list of fastest supercomputers in the world.

In the Green500 list of top supercomputers. Galileo reached the 389-th position in their benchmark, the system tested at 242.17 MFLOPS/W (Performance per watt).

== Technical details ==
Galileo is an IBM Linux infiniband cluster, with a NeXtScale architecture. It is made of 516 compute nodes. Each node contains 2x8-cores Intel Haswell processors (2.40 GHz) and a shared memory of 128 GB. The internal network is Infiniband with 4xQDR switches. The cluster is accessible though 8 login nodes, also user for visualization, reachable via ssh at the address login.galileo.cineca.it. The login nodes are equipped with 2 nVidia K40 GPU each. On the cluster there are also 8 service nodes NX360M5 for I/O and management. The Operating system for both executable and login nodes is CentOS 7.0.

Galileo is an heterogeneous hybrid cluster: 359 nodes are equipped with Intel accelerators (Intel Phi 7120p), 2 accelerators per node for a total of 768 Phi in the system; 40 nodes are equipped with nVidia accelerators (nVidia K80), 2 accelerators per node for a total of 80 K80 in the system.

== See also ==
- Supercomputing in Europe
