= Galilee of the Nations =

Record label

- Founded: 1997
- Country of origin: Israel
- Location: Galilee

Galilee of the Nations is a record label founded in 1997 in the Galilee, Israel. At first it was based in Tiberias, Israel, but later moved its offices to Nashville, Tennessee, US. The label specialises in music of Messianic content and style.

The label was involved in a 1998 joint project with Integrity Music, Adonai: The Power of Worship from the Land of Israel, a compilation album featuring multiple artists. Billboard called it "a stunning record featuring performances by several powerful artists". It is considered a leading supplier of messianic music with a growing portfolio of artists.

The label signed a long-term distribution deal with Provident Music Distribution in 1999. Galilee of the Nations Music was also affiliated with City of Peace Records and City of Peace Films and Video.

There is a website about Galilee Of The Nations & Messianic Music which is solely developed for the purpose of promoting Israeli singers. They have a collection of worship or praise releases from the popular artists and worship leaders from Israel often available as video and with written material too.

== Main artists ==
- Joel Chernoff released the album, The Restoration of Israel: Messianic Praise and Worship in 2000.
- Karen Davis. A reviewer for The Town Talk called Davis's album, Sar Shalom: Breakthrough from the Land of Israel "inspiring, haunting and well-worth hearing."
- Marty Goetz
- Lamb
- Les Morrison
- Ted Pearce
- Barry & Batya Segal
- Jonathan Settel
- Kathy Shooster
- Zemer Levav(English: Song of the Heart,) a messianic Jewish music ministry released an album As Long as I Breathe in 2013.
