= Galilea, La Rioja =

Galilea
- Municipality
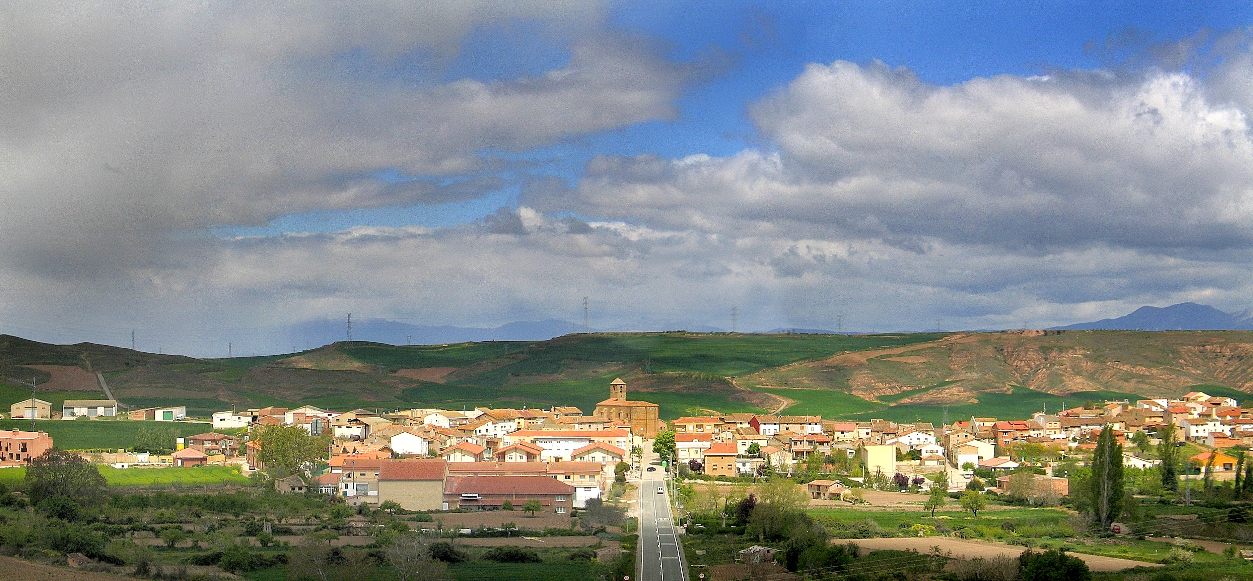
- Skyline of Galilea

- Coat of arms

- Location within La Rioja, Spain Location within Spain
- Coordinates: 42°20′53″N 2°14′09″W
- Country: Spain
- Autonomous community: La Rioja
- Comarca: Logroño

Government
  - Mayor: María Concepción Eguizábal Malo (PP)

Area
  - Total: 9.72 km^{2} (3.75 sq mi)
- Elevation: 558 m (1,831 ft)

Population (2025-01-01)
  - Total: 419
- Demonym(s): galileano - a / galileo, a
- Postal code: 26144
- Website: www.galilea.es

Galilea is a village in the province and autonomous community of La Rioja, Spain. The municipality covers an area of 9.72 square kilometres (3.75 sq mi) and as of 2011 had a population of 401 people.
