= GIOVE =

European Space Agency satellites

GIOVE (Italian for 'Jupiter'; pronounced [ˈdʒɔːve]), or Galileo In-Orbit Validation Element, is the name for two satellites built for the European Space Agency (ESA) to test technology in orbit for the Galileo positioning system.

The name was chosen as a tribute to Galileo Galilei, who discovered the first four natural satellites of Jupiter, and later discovered that they could be used as a universal clock to obtain the longitude of a point on the Earth's surface.

The GIOVE satellites are operated by the GIOVE Mission (GIOVE-M) segment in the frame of the risk mitigation for the In Orbit Validation (IOV) of the Galileo positioning system.

== Purpose ==
These validation satellites were previously known as the Galileo System Testbed (GSTB) version 2 (GSTB-V2). In 2004 the Galileo System Test Bed Version 1 (GSTB-V1) project validated the on-ground algorithms for Orbit Determination and Time Synchronization (OD&TS). This project, led by ESA and European Satellite Navigation Industries, has provided industry with fundamental knowledge to develop the mission segment of the Galileo positioning system.

GIOVE satellites transmitted multifrequency ranging signals equivalent to the signals of future Galileo: L1BC, L1A, E6BC, E6A, E5a, E5b. The main purpose of the GIOVE mission was to test and validate the reception and performance of novel code modulations designed for Galileo including new signals based on the use of the BOC (Binary Offset Carrier) technique, in particular the high-performance E5AltBOC signal.

== Satellites ==
GIOVE-A launch

=== GIOVE-A ===
Previously known as GSTB-V2/A, this satellite was constructed by Surrey Satellite Technology Ltd (SSTL).

Its mission has the main goal of claiming the frequencies allocated to Galileo by the ITU. It has two independently developed Galileo signal generation chains and also tests the design of two on-board rubidium atomic clocks and the orbital characteristics of the intermediate circular orbit for future satellites.

GIOVE-A is the first spacecraft whose design is based upon SSTL's new Geostationary Minisatellite Platform (GMP) satellite bus, intended for geostationary orbit. GIOVE-A is also SSTL's first satellite outside low Earth orbit, operating in medium Earth orbit), and is SSTL's first satellite to use deployable Sun-tracking solar arrays. Previous SSTL satellites use body-mounted solar arrays, which generate less power per unit area as they do not face the Sun directly.

==== Launched on 28 December 2005 ====
It was launched at 05:19 UTC on December 28, 2005, on a Soyuz-FG/Fregat from the Baikonur Cosmodrome in Kazakhstan.

==== First Galileo transmissions ====
It began communicating as planned at 09:01 UTC while circling the Earth at a height of 23,222 km. The satellite successfully transmitted its first navigation signals at 17:25 GMT on 12 January 2006. These signals were received at Chilbolton Observatory in Hampshire, UK and the ESA Station at Redu in Belgium. Teams from SSTL and ESA have measured the signal generated by GIOVE-A to ensure it meets the frequency-filing allocation and reservation requirements for the International Telecommunication Union (ITU), a process that was required to be complete by June 2006.

==== Technical details ====
The GIOVE-A signal in space is fully representative of the Galileo signal from the point of view of frequencies and modulations, chip rates, and data rates. However, GIOVE-A can only transmit at two frequency bands at a time (i.e., L1+E5 or L1+E6).

GIOVE-A codes are different from Galileo codes. The GIOVE-A navigation message is not representative from the structure and contents viewpoint (demonstration only purpose). The generation of pseudorange measurements and detailed analysis of the tracking noise and multipath performance of GIOVE-A ranging signals have been performed with the use of the GETR (Galileo Experimental Test Receiver) designed by Septentrio.

There has been some public controversy about the open source nature of some of the Pseudo-Random Noise (PRN) codes. In the early part of 2006, researchers at Cornell monitored the GIOVE-A signal and extracted the PRN codes. The methods used and the codes which were found were published in the June 2006 issue of GPS World. ESA has now made the codes public.

==== Retirement ====
GIOVE-A was retired (but not decommissioned) on 30 June 2012, after being raised in altitude to make way for an operational satellite. It remained under command by SSTL until 24 November 2021, when it was officially decommissioned.

=== GIOVE-B ===
GIOVE-B (previously called GSTB-V2/B), has a similar mission, but has greatly improved signal generation hardware.

It was originally built by satellite consortium European Satellite Navigation Industries, but following re-organization of the project in 2007, the satellite prime contractor responsibility was passed to Astrium.

GIOVE-B also has MEO environment characterization objectives, as well as signal-in-space and receiver experimentation objectives. GIOVE-B carries three atomic clocks: two rubidium standards and the first space-qualified passive hydrogen maser.

==== Launched on 27 April 2008 ====

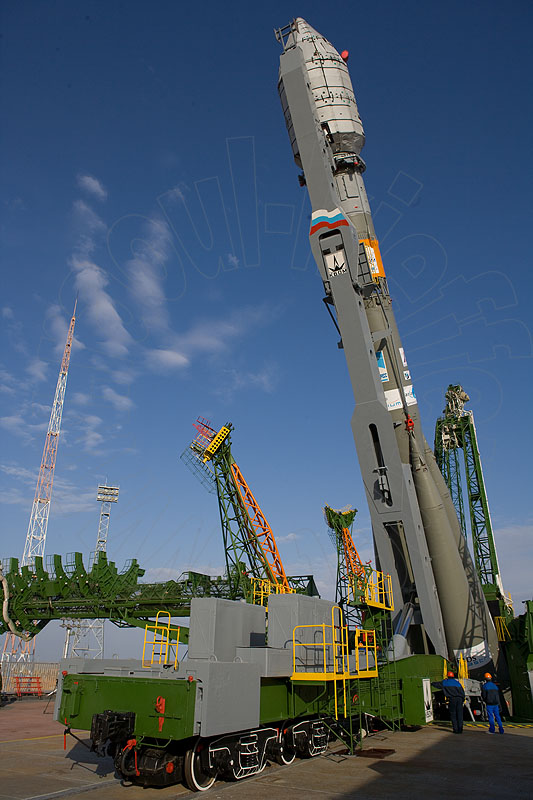

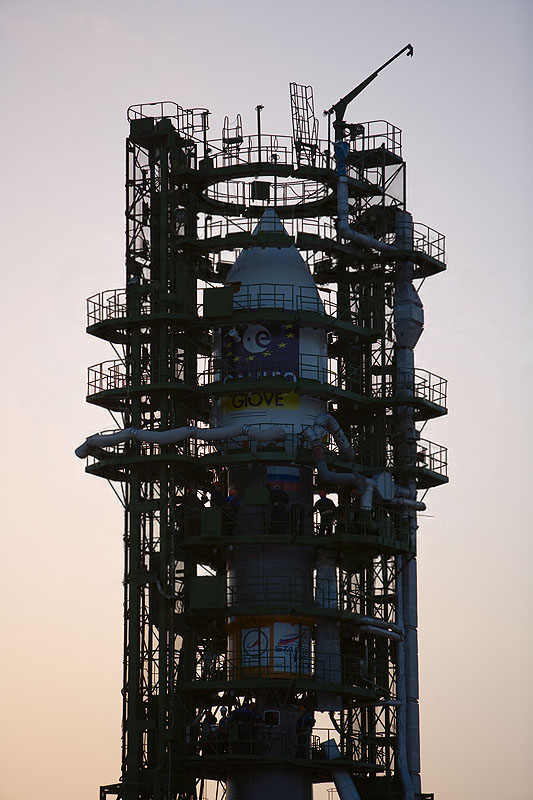

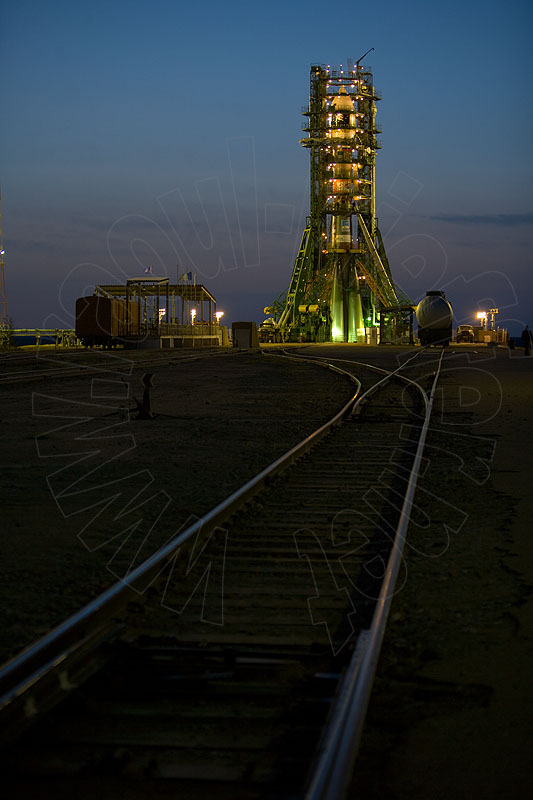

The launch was delayed due to various technical problems, and took place on 27 April 2008 at 04:16 Baikonur time (22:16 UTC Saturday) aboard a Soyuz-FG/Fregat rocket provided by Starsem. The Fregat stage was ignited three times to place the satellite into orbit. Giove-B reached its projected orbit after 02:00 UTC and successfully deployed its solar panels.

==== First Galileo navigation transmissions ====
GIOVE-B started transmitting navigation signals on May 7, 2008. The reception of the signals by GETR receivers and other means has been confirmed at a few ESA facilities.

==== Technical details ====
According to ESA, this is "a truly historic step for satellite navigation since GIOVE-B is now, for the first time, transmitting the GPS-Galileo common signal using a specific optimised waveform, MBOC (multiplexed binary offset carrier), in accordance with the agreement drawn up in July 2007 by the EU and the US for their respective systems, Galileo and the future GPS III".

"Now with GIOVE-B broadcasting its highly accurate signal in space we have a true representation of what Galileo will offer to provide the most advanced satellite positioning services, while ensuring compatibility and interoperability with GPS", said ESA Galileo Project Manager, Javier Benedicto.

After launch, early orbit operations and platform commissioning, GIOVE-B's navigation payload was switched on and signal transmission commenced on May 7 and the quality of these signals is now being checked. Several facilities are involved in this process, including the GIOVE-B Control Centre at Telespazio's facilities in Fucino, Italy, the Galileo Processing Centre at ESA's European Space Research and Technology Centre (ESTEC), in the Netherlands, the ESA ground station at Redu, Belgium, and the Rutherford Appleton Laboratory (RAL) Chilbolton Observatory in the United Kingdom.

Chilbolton's 25-metre antenna makes it possible to analyse the characteristics of GIOVE-B signals with great accuracy and verify that they conform to the Galileo system's design specification. Each time the satellite is visible from Redu and Chilbolton, the large antennas are activated and track the satellite. GIOVE-B is orbiting at an altitude of 23 173 kilometres, making a complete journey around the Earth in 14 hours and 3 minutes.

The quality of the signals transmitted by GIOVE-B will have an important influence on the accuracy of the positioning information that will be provided by the user receivers on the ground. On board, GIOVE-B carries a passive hydrogen maser atomic clock, which is expected to deliver unprecedented stability performance.

The signal quality can be affected by the environment of the satellite in its orbit and by the propagation path of the signals travelling from space to ground. Additionally, the satellite signals must not create interference with services operating in adjacent frequency bands, and this is also being checked.

Galileo teams within ESA and industry have the means to observe and record the spectrum of the signals transmitted by GIOVE-B in real time. Several measurements are performed relating to transmitted signal power, centre frequency and bandwidth, as well as the format of the navigation signals generated on board. This allows the analysis of the satellite transmissions in the three frequency bands reserved for it.

The GIOVE-B mission also represents an opportunity for validating in-orbit critical satellite technologies, characterising the Medium Earth Orbit (MEO) radiation environment, and to test a key element of the future Galileo system - the user receivers.

==== Retirement ====
GIOVE B was retired (but not decommissioned) on 23 July 2012.

=== GIOVE-A2 ===
With the delays of GIOVE-B, the European Space Agency again contracted with SSTL for a second satellite, to ensure that the Galileo programme continues without any interruptions that could lead to loss of frequency allocations. Construction of GIOVE-A2 was terminated due to the successful launch and in-orbit operation of GIOVE-B.

== Mission segment ==
The GIOVE Mission segment, or GIOVE-M, is the name of a project dedicated to the exploitation and experimentation of the GIOVE satellites. The GIOVE Mission was intended to ensure risk mitigation of the In Orbit Validation (IOV) phase of the Galileo positioning system.

== GIOVE Mission history ==
The GIOVE Mission Segment began in October 2005 with the purpose of providing experimental results based on real data to be used for risk mitigation throughout the overall Galileo In Orbit Validation (IOV) phase of the Galileo positioning system.

The GIOVE Mission segment infrastructure was based on evolution of the Galileo System Test Bed Version 1 (GSTB-V1) infrastructure conceived to process data from the GIOVE-A and GIOVE-B satellites. The GIOVE Mission segment was composed of a central processing facility called the Giove Processing Center (GPC) and a network of thirteen experimental Giove Sensor Stations (GESS).

The main objectives of the GIOVE Mission Segment experimentation were in the areas of:

- On-board clock characterisation
- Navigation message generation
- Orbit modelling
