= USS Monitor (LSV-5) =

1943 Osage-class vehicle landing ship

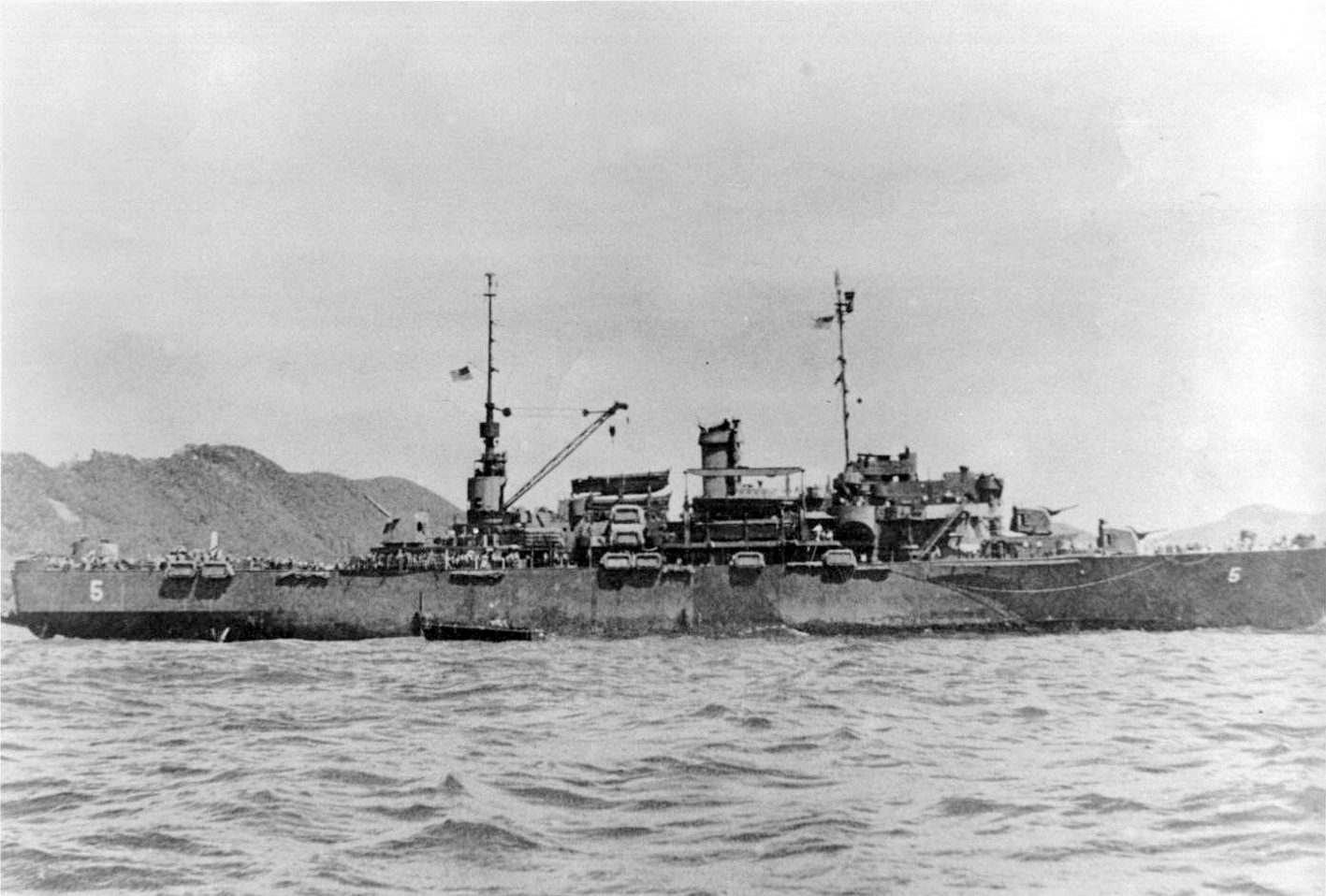
- Monitor in 1945

History

United States
- Name: USS Monitor
- Namesake: USS Monitor
- Builder: Ingalls Shipbuilding Corporation, Pascagoula, Mississippi
- Laid down: 21 October 1941, as AN-1 (Net laying ship)
- Launched: 29 January 1943
- Commissioned: 14 June 1944
- Decommissioned: 22 May 1947
- Out of service: 1961
- Reclassified: AP-160 (Transport), 2 August 1943; LSV-5 (Landing Ship Vehicle), 21 April 1944; MCS-5 (Mine Countermeasures Support Ship), 18 October 1956
- Stricken: 1 September 1961
- Honours and awards: 4 battle stars (World War II)
- Fate: Scrapped, 1961

General characteristics
- Class & type: Osage-class vehicle landing ship
- Displacement: 4,626 long tons (4,700 t) light; 9,040 long tons (9,185 t) full
- Length: 458 ft (140 m)
- Beam: 60 ft 2 in (18.34 m)
- Draft: 20 ft (6.1 m)
- Propulsion: 4 × Combustion Engineering 2-drum boilers; 2 × General Electric geared turbines; 2 shafts
- Speed: 21 knots (39 km/h; 24 mph)
- Capacity: 19 × LVTs or 29 DUKWs
- Troops: 122 officers, 1236 enlisted men
- Complement: 458 officers and enlisted men
- Armament: 2 × single 5-inch/38-caliber gun mounts (forward); 1 × twin 5"/38 caliber gun mount (aft); 4 × twin 40 mm guns; 20 × single 20 mm guns

USS Monitor (hull number LSV-5/AN-1/AP-160/MCS-5) was an Osage-class vehicle landing ship built for the United States Navy during World War II. She was named after the original USS Monitor (the first ironclad warship commissioned by the USN and the first U.S. Naval vessel to bear the name), and was the second U.S. Naval vessel to bear the name.

Laid down on 21 October 1941 as netlayer AN-1 by the Ingalls Shipbuilding Corporation of Pascagoula, Mississippi and launched on 29 January 1943; sponsored by Mrs. John A. Terhune. She was redesignated AP-160 on 2 August 1943, and first commissioned on 18 March 1944. Due to delays in construction, the ship was transferred under her own power to Todd Shipyards, Brooklyn, New York for completion on 2 April. Redesignated as a Landing Ship, Vehicle, on 21 April 1944, USS Monitor (LSV-5) was commissioned for service on 14 June 1944.

== Service history ==
=== Philippines, 1944–1945 ===
Following shakedown in Chesapeake Bay, Monitor steamed via the Panama Canal to Pearl Harbor, arriving 10 August. Loading troops, cargo and amphibious DUKWs, the ship joined the 3rd Fleet off Leyte in October, participating in the landings at Leyte Gulf on 20 October and then removing wounded for transport to Morotai. She returned to Leyte with reinforcements 14 November and then sailed for Sansapor where she reloaded troops and equipment for the invasion of Luzon. Steaming for Lingayen Gulf, under air attack much of the way, the vehicle landing ship put her assault force ashore 9 January 1945 and then stood by in support, shooting down an enemy aircraft that night with only 28 rounds of 40 mm expended.

In the closing days of January, the ship took part in two invasions in support of the Lingayen operation, the landing on San Felipe and La Paz on 29 January, and the landing of Army Rangers on Grande Island in Subic Bay on 30 January.

=== Okinawa, 1945 ===
Monitor then steamed for Guadalcanal where she loaded marines for transport to Okinawa, participating in the "D-Day" landings on 1 April and then standing by off that hotly contested island until 10 May when she sailed for the United States. During May, June, and July, the LSV made several trips between Pearl Harbor and the west coast with passengers and cargo and then in August proceeded to Saipan to load medical personnel and supplies, departing on the 15th for Japan.

=== Occupation duties, 1945–1947 ===
Joining the 3rd Fleet off Tokyo, Monitor took on board 1,000 sailors from battleships Missouri, Indiana, Wisconsin, Massachusetts, and Alabama, conducting the first landing on the Japanese homeland on 30 August. The ship then served as a hospital ship to assist in the removal of Allied prisoners of war, over 8,000 repatriates being received on board and helped on their way before the amphibious vessel departed Japan 19 September. Returning to the United States, Monitor was assigned to "Operation Magic Carpet," the massive program to bring the troops home. She operated on this mission until decommissioning in the Reserve Fleet, Galveston, Texas 22 May 1947.

Reclassified MCS-5 on 18 October 1956, Monitor was struck from the Naval Vessel Register on 1 September 1961 and transferred to the Maritime National Defense Reserve Fleet in Beaumont, Texas.

Monitor earned four battle stars for World War II service.

== See also ==
- Net laying ship § 1930s
