= European Satellite Navigation Industries =

European aerospace company

European Satellite Navigation Industries, formerly called Galileo Industries until legal action prompted a name change, was a joint venture of the companies Alcatel Alenia Space and Thales (France), Finmeccanica (Italy), EADS Astrium (UK and Germany) and Galileo Sistemas y Servicios (a consortium of seven Spanish companies).

The company was the primary construction company for the Galileo positioning system, tasked with developing and building the satellites and components for the ground segment infrastructure of this satellite navigation system. The partner firms committed to not construct competing products for Galileo. However, some competition came from Surrey Satellite Technology Ltd, which successfully built and launched the first GIOVE-A testbed satellite, and which was then awarded a contract for a followon GIOVE-A2 satellite while the joint venture's GIOVE-B satellite remained on the ground awaiting launch. Since that time, the GIOVE-B satellite successfully launched, although after the Galileo project had been abandoned by European Satellite Navigation Industries and taken up by the European Union.

The company was headquartered at Ottobrunn near Munich, with an office in Rome. The company employed around two hundred people, many working directly for their parent corporations.

== Update ==
This private sector group of eight companies abandoned Galileo in 2007. Subsequently, EU has taken over the construction of Galileo positioning system. On 21 December 2007 ESA terminated the Galileo contract with the European Satellite Navigation Industries.
