= Against the Galileans =

Partially lost polemic essay by Roman Emperor Julian

Against the Galileans (Ancient Greek: Κατὰ Γαλιλαίων; Latin: Contra Galilaeos), meaning Christians, was a Greek polemical essay – now mostly lost – written by the Roman emperor Julian, commonly known as Julian the Apostate, during his short reign (361–363). Despite having been originally written in Greek, it is better known under its Latin name. As emperor, Julian had tried to stop the growing influence of Christianity in the Roman Empire, and had encouraged support for the original pagan imperial cults and ethnic religions of the Empire. In this essay Julian described what he considered to be the mistakes and dangers of the Christian faith, and he attempted to throw an unflattering light on ongoing disputes inside the Christian Church. Julian portrayed Christians as apostates from Judaism, which the Emperor considered to be a very old and established religion that should be fully accepted. After Julian's death in battle in 363, the essay was anathematized, the text was lost. Julian's arguments are only known second-hand, through texts written by Christian authors, mainly from the extensive quotations in the polemical response Contra Julianum by Cyril of Alexandria.

== Introduction ==
Julian was the last pagan emperor to rule the Roman Empire. As he was a nephew of the emperor Constantine, he had been brought up as a Christian, though he studied with Neoplatonists while growing up, and secretly abandoned Christianity in 351. After he became the Roman Emperor, he tried to end the persecution of pagans that had been carried out over the previous decades, legalizing cult sacrifice, restoring many pagan temples, and financing cults. Though he did not persecute Christians or forbid Christianity, he ended subsidies to the Christian church and ended the punishments that had been given to heretical Christians. He also composed treatises that attacked those whose ideas he disagreed with, including two on those he called "false Cynics", and Against the Galileans, which was written during his stay in Antioch in the winter of 362–363.

The text of Against the Galileans does not survive, probably being destroyed in an anti-pagan edict in 448 or 529. What is known of it comes from the writings of Cyril of Alexandria, who quoted it at length while writing a refutation that was finished either between 434–437 or 439–441. Cyril's refutation, however, does not survive fully intact. Only ten books still exist, all of which cover the first book out of three of Against the Galileans, though multiple fragments of another ten books also survive. Cyril claimed that it was one of the most important anti-Christian works that had been written, and that it was widely considered to be irrefutable, while Libanius praised it as an even greater work than the critiques of Porphyry of Tyre. Though many Christian authors had written texts in which they scorned Julian, only Theodore of Mopsuestia had previously attempted a refutation of the work before Cyril.

Aside from the obvious divide of one being a Christian and one a pagan, Cyril's religious views were very different from Julian's. Whereas Julian had supported the Jewish community in the Roman Empire and sought to rebuild their temple, Cyril often wrote of how the Jewish community stood in the way of Christianity, and that Gentiles ought to reject all things Jewish, including the idea of rebuilding the Temple in Jerusalem, an idea which Julian had embraced. Perhaps it was this fundamental disagreement over the value of the Jewish faith that made Cyril's refutation so bitter, as it speaks of Julian as a satanically inspired man who desired to drag as many others as he could away from the Christian faith, and the Greek tradition that Julian came from as folly. According to Cyril, any truth that was in the Greek texts was there as a result of the Greeks having heard of the wisdom of Moses – even Plato supposedly was a great admirer of the Jewish lawgiver. His refutation was thus an attempt to prove that Julian's view of the Platonic tradition as superior to the Mosaic religious tradition was, in fact, the reverse of the truth, as it was the Greeks whose words were a shadow of the truth of Moses.

== Synopsis ==
=== How men came to believe in the Divine ===
Julian first criticizes the practice of the Galileans of denying the existence of the gods, and their practice, taken from the Greeks, of being lazy and superstitious (43A–52C). Julian claims that men inherently recognize the concept of divinity without being taught of it and that all men have an inherent belief that the gods reside in the heavens and observe what occurs in the world. Further, all men, from looking at the stable nature of the heavenly bodies, have come to believe that the gods are eternal and unchanging (43A–52C).

=== What the Greeks and Hebrews say about the Divine ===
Julian goes on to discuss the creation myths of the Greeks and the Jews, citing the account of the Book of Genesis. He ridicules the idea of literally interpreting the Jewish account, claiming that it is not only logically impossible (75B) – he asks how the serpent was able to speak a human language (86A) – but that is also blasphemous and insulting to God (89B). A true God, he says, would not have withheld the knowledge of good and evil from men or have been jealous of men eating from the tree of life and living forever. Julian argues that this behavior shows God to be evil and the serpent, giving man the enormously valuable gift of differentiating good and evil, to be good. Therefore, it must have a deeper meaning (94A).

Julian also brings up questions from the account of how God created the world. Julian asks where the abyss, the darkness, and the waters come from that are mentioned (49C), and where the angels came from, since they are not mentioned in the creation account. To Julian, the account of Genesis is not about a creator God, but about an inferior god who merely shaped the matter that had already been created (49E). He compares this to Plato's account of the creation in Timaeus, in which inferior gods shape the matter created by the creator God (58C), and concludes that the Genesis account cannot adequately explain who created the matter that the God of Moses shaped (49E). Julian goes on to argue that there must be more than one god who shaped matter (66A), as if there was only one God, all created beings would be identical. The fact that there is such a difference between immortal beings, humans, and animals, proves that different gods shaped different beings (65D). The God of Moses, being a god who chose the Jews as his people and gave them alone the gift of prophecy and his teachings, is merely the god of the Jewish people, not the god of any other race of men (106D). Julian finds it absurd to believe that the God who created everything in the world, who describes himself as being a jealous God (106D–E), was content to confine himself to caring for a small tribe in Palestine while letting all races besides the Jews worship false gods for thousands of years (106D).

Julian then discusses how the Greeks view the gods as being the delegates of the creator God, each responsible for caring for different nations, cities, and races of men (115D), which explains why the character and customs of men are so different (131C). He mocks the idea that a literal interpretation of the story of the Tower of Babel can adequately explain why men differ so greatly, saying that it does not explain why men have different morals or laws or why they have such marked physical differences (138A). Instead, he believes, different gods responsible for different races and nations are responsible for mankind's differences (143A). The God of Moses does exist, but only as an inferior to the God of All (148B). Julian expounds on this idea, asking why, if the Jewish God is the only god, the Jews have not accomplished as much as other races, such as the Greeks, Phoenicians or Egyptians (178A), and why the Jews have been subjugated by so many other races (213A).

=== Why the Galileans have abandoned Jewish beliefs ===
Julian spends time discussing how, even after having nominally embraced Jewish traditions, Galileans have really rejected them and only accepted their blasphemy of the gods (238A–B). He criticizes the belief that Jesus is the prophet that was predicted by Moses and Isaiah, as Jesus, supposedly being the son of God, was not descended from Judah, and says that the idea of a god who claims to be the sole God creating a being equal to him (and thus a second God) goes against the monotheistic beliefs of Judaism (253A–B). He points out that Galileans have abandoned many of the central tenets of Judaism, such as the sacrificing of animals (305D) and its dietary restrictions (314C), and criticizes the claim that God has set up a new law for them while Moses so adamantly warned against changing the law (320B).

Along with abandoning Jewish teachings, Julian also charges the Galileans with abandoning those of the original apostles (327A). He claims that no apostle claimed that Jesus was God until John, and he probably only did so to clarify an important dispute within a disunited church (327A). Galileans also disobey the words of Jesus, as they revere tombs and the dead, while Jesus referred to gravesites as places of impurity (335B). Julian then brings up other Jewish practices abandoned by Galileans such as circumcision and the celebration of Passover, wondering why they have abandoned such practices when they were assigned such importance in the Jewish law (351A), going so far as to claim that the religious practices of Moses and Abraham are far closer to the religious practices of the Greeks than those of the Galileans (356C).
