= History of GLONASS =

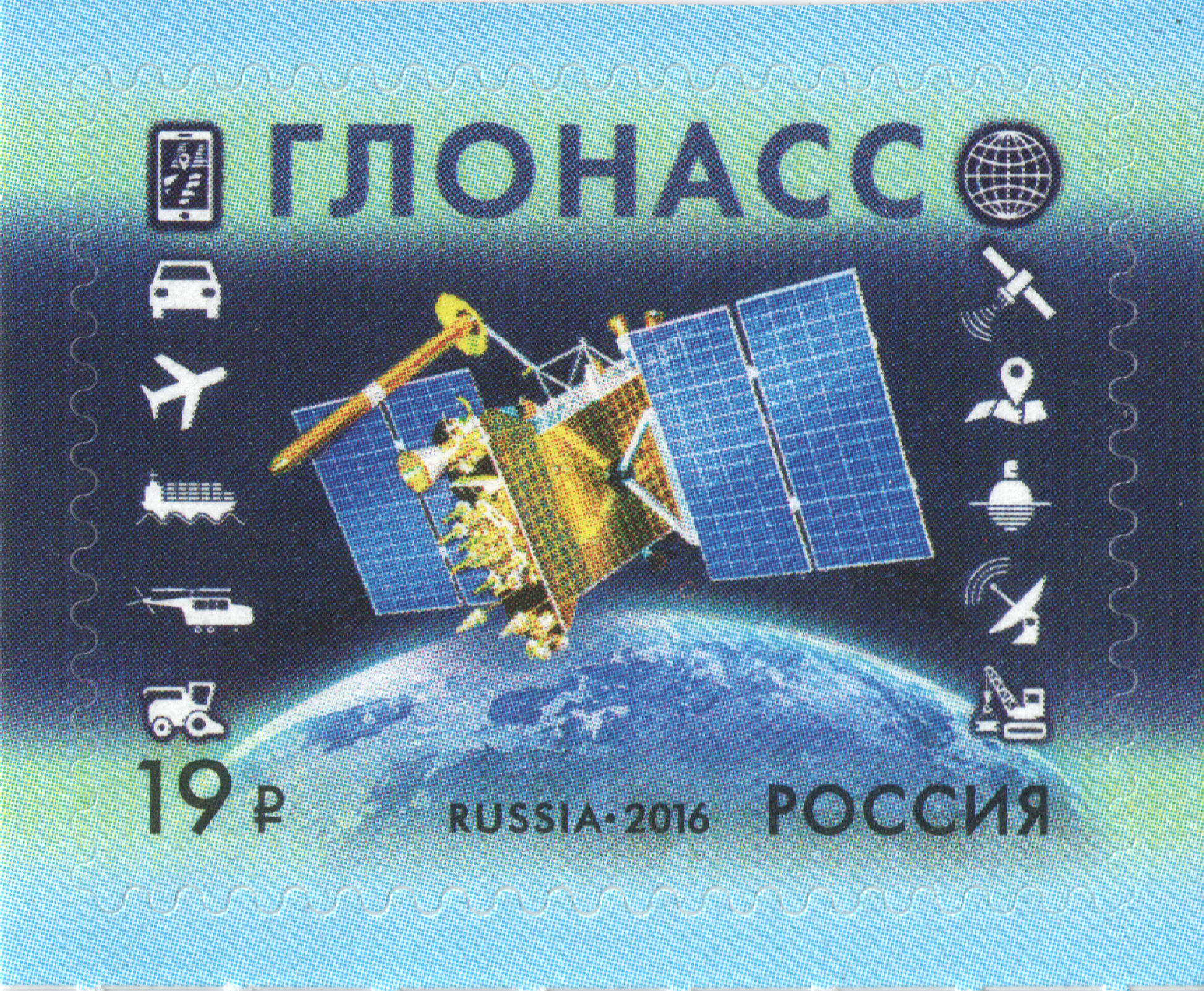
Russian 2016 stamp with a GLONASS satellite.

The satellite navigation system GLONASS was conceived in the late 1960s, and formal requirements were completed in 1970. The government of the Soviet Union made a decision to develop the system in 1976. Design work was carried out by specialists led by Vladimir Cheremisin at NPO PM in Krasnoyarsk-26. The first launch took place in 1982. Until its dissolution in 1991, the Soviet Union launched 43 GLONASS-related satellites. Work on the system was continued by the Russian Federation which brought it its full operational capability in 1995. In the following years, the system fell into disrepair due to the economic crisis in the country and diminished space funding. Starting from 2000, the government under President Vladimir Putin made the restoration of GLONASS a top priority; its funding was doubled and after a lull of several years, launches were restarted again. In 2003, a new satellite design, GLONASS-M, was introduced. By early 2011, GLONASS had 22 operational satellites, two short of the required constellation of 24 to provide global coverage. The latest and significantly improved satellite type, GLONASS-K, was launched in February 2011.

== 1970–1979: Inception and design ==
The first satellite-based radio navigation system developed in the Soviet Union was Tsiklon, which had the purpose of providing ballistic missile submarines a method for accurate positioning. 31 Tsiklon satellites were launched between 1967 and 1978. The main problem with the system was that, although highly accurate for stationary or slow-moving ships, it required several hours of observation by the receiving station to fix a position, making it unusable for many navigation purposes and for the guidance of the new generation of ballistic missiles.

From 1968 to 1969, the research institutes of the Ministry of Defence, Academy of Sciences, and Soviet Navy cooperated to develop a single system for navigation of their air, land, sea, and space forces. The requirements of such a system were formulated in a document completed in 1970. Six years later, in December 1976, a plan for developing the system was accepted by the Central Committee of the CPSU and of the Council of Ministers of the USSR in a decree entitled "On Deployment of the Unified Space Navigation System GLONASS."

The task of designing GLONASS was given to a group of young specialists at NPO PM in the city of Krasnoyarsk-26 (today called Zheleznogorsk). Under the leadership of the Vladimir Cheremisin, they developed different proposals, from which the institute's director Grigory Chernyavsky selected the final one. The work was completed in the late 1970s; the system would consist of 24 satellites operating at an altitude of 20,000 km in medium circular orbit. It would be able to promptly fix the receiving station's position based on signals from 4 satellites, and also reveal the object's speed and direction. The satellites would be launched 3 at a time on the heavy-lift Proton rocket. Due to the large number of satellites needed for the program, NPO PM delegated the manufacturing of the satellites to PO Polyot in Omsk, which had better production capabilities.

Originally, GLONASS was designed to have an accuracy of 65 m, but in reality it had an accuracy of 20 m in the civilian signal and 10 m in the military signal. The first generation GLONASS satellites were 7.8 m tall, had a width of 7.2 m, measured across their solar panels, and a mass of 1,260 kg.

== 1980–1995: Achieving full orbital constellation ==
In the early 1980s, NPO PM received the first prototype satellites from PO Polyot for ground tests. Many of the produced parts were of low quality and NPO PM engineers had to perform substantial redesigning, leading to a delay. On 12 October 1982, three satellites, designated Kosmos-1413, Kosmos-1414, and Kosmos-1415 were launched aboard a Proton rocket. As only one GLONASS satellite was ready in time for the launch instead of the expected three, it was decided to launch it along with two mock-ups. The American media reported the event as a launch of one satellite and "two secret objects." For a long time, the Americans could not find out the nature of those "objects". The Telegraph Agency of the Soviet Union (TASS) covered the launch, describing GLONASS as a system "created to determine positioning of civil aviation aircraft, navy transport and fishing-boats of the Soviet Union".

From 1982 through April 1991, the Soviet Union successfully launched a total of 43 GLONASS-related satellites plus five test satellites. When the Soviet Union disintegrated in 1991, twelve functional GLONASS satellites in two planes were operational; enough to allow limited usage of the system (to cover the entire territory of the country, 18 satellites would have been necessary.) The Russian Federation took over control of the constellation and continued its development. In 1993, the system, now consisting of 12 satellites, was formally declared operational and in December 1995, the constellation was finally brought to its optimal status of 24 operational satellites. This brought the precision of GLONASS on-par with the American GPS system, which had achieved full operational capability two years earlier.

== 1996–1999: Economic crisis and fall into disrepair ==
Since the first generation satellites operated for 3 years each, to keep the system at full capacity, two launches per year would have been necessary to maintain the full network of 24 satellites. However, in the financially difficult period of 1989–1999, the space program's funding was cut by 80% and Russia consequently found itself unable to afford this launch rate. After the full complement was achieved in December 1995, there were no further launches until December 1999. As a result, the constellation reached its lowest point of just 6 operational satellites in 2001. As a prelude to demilitarisation, responsibility of the program was transferred from the Ministry of Defence to Russia's civilian space agency Roscosmos.

== 2000–2007: Renewed efforts and modernization ==
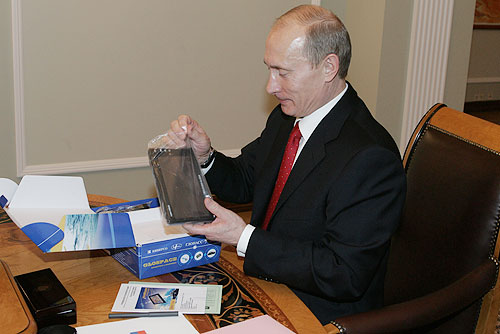
President Vladimir Putin with a GLONASS car navigation device. As President, Putin paid special attention to the development of GLONASS.

In the early 2000s, under Vladimir Putin's presidency, the Russian economy recovered and state finances improved considerably. Putin himself took special interest in GLONASS and the system's restoration was made one of the government's top priorities.

For this purpose, in August 2001, the Federal Targeted Program "Global Navigation System" 2002–2011 (Government Decision n.587) was launched. The program was given a budget of $420 million and aimed at restoring the full constellation by 2009. The program was divided to three phases. In the first phase, the constellation would be partially restored to 18 satellites and a new satellite type (GLONASS-M) would be introduced. In the second step (2006–2011), the system would be brought to fully operational status with 24 satellites, and another, smaller and more accurate satellite design, GLONASS-K would be introduced.

On 10 December 2003, the second generation satellite design, GLONASS-M, was launched for the first time. It had a slightly larger mass than the baseline GLONASS, standing at 1,415 kg, but it had double the original's lifetime, decreasing the required replacement rate by 50%. The new satellite also had better accuracy and ability to broadcast two extra civilian signals.

In 2006, Defence Minister Sergey Ivanov ordered one of the signals (with an accuracy of 30 m) to be made available to civilian users. Putin, however, was not satisfied with this, and demanded that the whole system should be made fully available to everyone. Consequently, on 18 May 2007, all restrictions were lifted. The accurate, formerly military-only signal with a precision of 10 m, has since then been freely available to civilian users.

During the middle of the first decade of the 2000s, the Russian economy boomed, resulting in substantial increases in the country's space budget. In 2007, the financing of the GLONASS program was increased considerably. Its budget was almost doubled: while in 2006 the GLONASS had received $181 million from the federal budget, in 2007 the amount was increased to $380 million.

In the end, 140.1 billion rubles ($4.7 billion) were spent on the program 2001–2011, making it Roscosmos' largest project and consuming a third of its 2010 budget of 84.5 billion rubles.

== 2008–2011: Restoring full capacity ==
In June 2008, the system consisted of 16 satellites, 12 of which were fully operational at the time. Roscosmos aimed at having a full constellation of 24 satellites in orbit by 2010.

=== Promoting commercial use ===
Although the GLONASS constellation is nearing global coverage, its commercialisation, especially development of the user segment, has been lacking compared to the American GPS system. For example, the first commercial Russian-made GLONASS navigation device for cars, Glospace-SGK 70, was introduced in 2007, but it was much bigger and more costly than similar GPS receivers.

A protectionistic measure for improving the GLONASS user segment was proposed by Vladimir Evtushenkov main shareholder of JFSC Sistema. In a meeting with Russian prime minister Vladimir Putin, Evtushenkov called for an import ban on all the GPS-capable devices unless these devices support Glonass as well. Evtushenkov claimed that Russian authorities had already started negotiations with major vendors like Nokia, Siemens and Motorola. Vladimir Putin agreed that "It is good that our partners understand our need to protect our national interests and promote our product". According to Russian experts, it was possible that mobile devices like smartphones would be effectively banned as well. Some producers claimed that if additional expenses to add GLONASS were too high, they may consider turning off satnav feature in devices for Russian market to avoid import ban.

Following a December 2006 meeting in Moscow of the GPS-GLONASS Interoperability and Compatibility Working Group (WG-1), it was announced that in the future, GLONASS satellites would transmit a CDMA in addition to the FDMA. This would make GLONASS compatible with GPS, GALILEO and Compass receivers, which also use the CDMA method. A change in the GLONASS system from its current FDMA technique to the GPS and Galileo's format would enable a simply-designed receiver to use multiple satellite systems simultaneously.

On August 11, 2010, Deputy Prime Minister Sergei Ivanov, who is in charge of GLONASS development, called for a 25% import duty on all GPS-capable devices unless they are compatible with GLONASS, by October 27, 2010, he confirmed a plan was being developed. The duty is proposed to be implemented from January 2011. Russian government believes this move would "stimulate international interest" in the system.

As well, the government is planning to force all car manufacturers in Russia to make cars with GLONASS starting from 2011. This will affect all car makers, including foreign brands like Ford and Toyota, which have car assembling facilities in Russia.

Current GPS and phone baseband chips from major vendors ST-Ericsson, Broadcom CSR and Qualcomm all support GLONASS in combination with GPS. Any import restriction is likely to have little change as most devices shipping worldwide will soon support GLONASS.

In 2009, the head of the Russian Federal Space Agency Anatoly Perminov announced a new GLONASS project called "ERA" (Russian: ЭРА ГЛОНАСС), an acronym for "Emergency Response to Accidents" (Russian: Система экстренного реагирования при авариях). This system will provide location services for emergency calls and is based on the European eCall standard. In 2012, interoperability tests were successfully conducted in Finland using Russian-built ERA-GLONASS terminals and eCall Public Safety Answering Call infrastructure. Test pilot zones will be launched in Russia in 2013, and by 2017 all new vehicles are required to include ERA-GLONASS equipment.

The first phase of the project will include equipping automobiles with GLONASS receivers and creation of back-end software which will provide call center operators within emergency services with geographic data. The second phase will also involve GPS/GLONASS enabled phones and smartphones.

There is also a planned project called "Social GLONASS". It will help people who require supervision, such as old people, children, and people with reduced vision.

=== Finishing the constellation ===
Russia's aim of finishing the constellation in 2010 suffered a setback when a December 2010 launch of three GLONASS-M satellites failed. The Proton-M itself performed flawlessly, but the upper stage Blok DM3 (a new version which was to make its maiden flight) was loaded with too much fuel due to a sensor failure. As a result, the upper stage and the three satellites crashed into the Pacific Ocean. Kommersant estimated the launch failure cost up to $160 million. Russian president Dmitry Medvedev ordered a full audit of the entire $2 billion program and an investigation into the failure.

Following the mishap, Roscosmos activated two reserve satellites and decided to make the first GLONASS-K satellite, to be launched in February 2011, part of the operational constellation instead of mainly for testing as was originally planned. This would bring the total number of satellites to 23, obtaining almost complete worldwide coverage. The second GLONASS-K would be ready within three to four months.

The third generation GLONASS-K satellites have an operational lifetime of 10 years, compared to the 7-year lifetime of the second generation GLONASS-M, and to the 3-year lifetime of the original GLONASS satellite. The mass of the new satellite is just 750 kg, compared to 1,450 kg of GLONASS-M. This means that two can be orbited at time on a Soyuz-2.1b rocket, or six at a time on Proton-M. In contrast, only three GLONASS-M satellites can be launched on Proton-M at a time. The new satellite design is expected to double the accuracy of the GLONASS system.

== 2011–2020: Transitioning to CDMA signals ==
On a May 28, 2014 interview, Nikolay Testoyedov — president of ISS Reshetnev — stated that production of GLONASS-M would end in 2015, with GLONASS-K being exclusively produced after that final batch. In a December 14, 2014 interview with GPS World, he stated that while the original idea was to have just two GLONASS-K1 prototypes to be followed by the GLONASS-K2 production, the international sanctions limited the supply of radiation resistant electronics. And thus, they had decided to launch an additional nine GLONASS-K1 as fleet replacement while they finished the GLONASS-K2 design. On 11 May 2015, Leonid Gusev, one of the main designers of the GLONASS system and the COSPAS-SARSAT, died at the age of 92 years.

In a May, 2015 presentation, Mr. Testoyedov expected the last GLONASS-M to fly in late 2017, with serial production of GLONASS-K1 to start flying in early 2018, just after the launch of the first GLONASS-K2 prototype. The presentation showed at least eleven additional GLONASS-K1 satellites flying until 2020. On July 30, 2015, ISS Reshtev announced that it had completed the last GLONASS-M (N° 61) spacecraft and it was putting it in storage waiting for launch, along an additional eight already built satellites.
