= GLONASS-K2 =

Russian navigation satellite

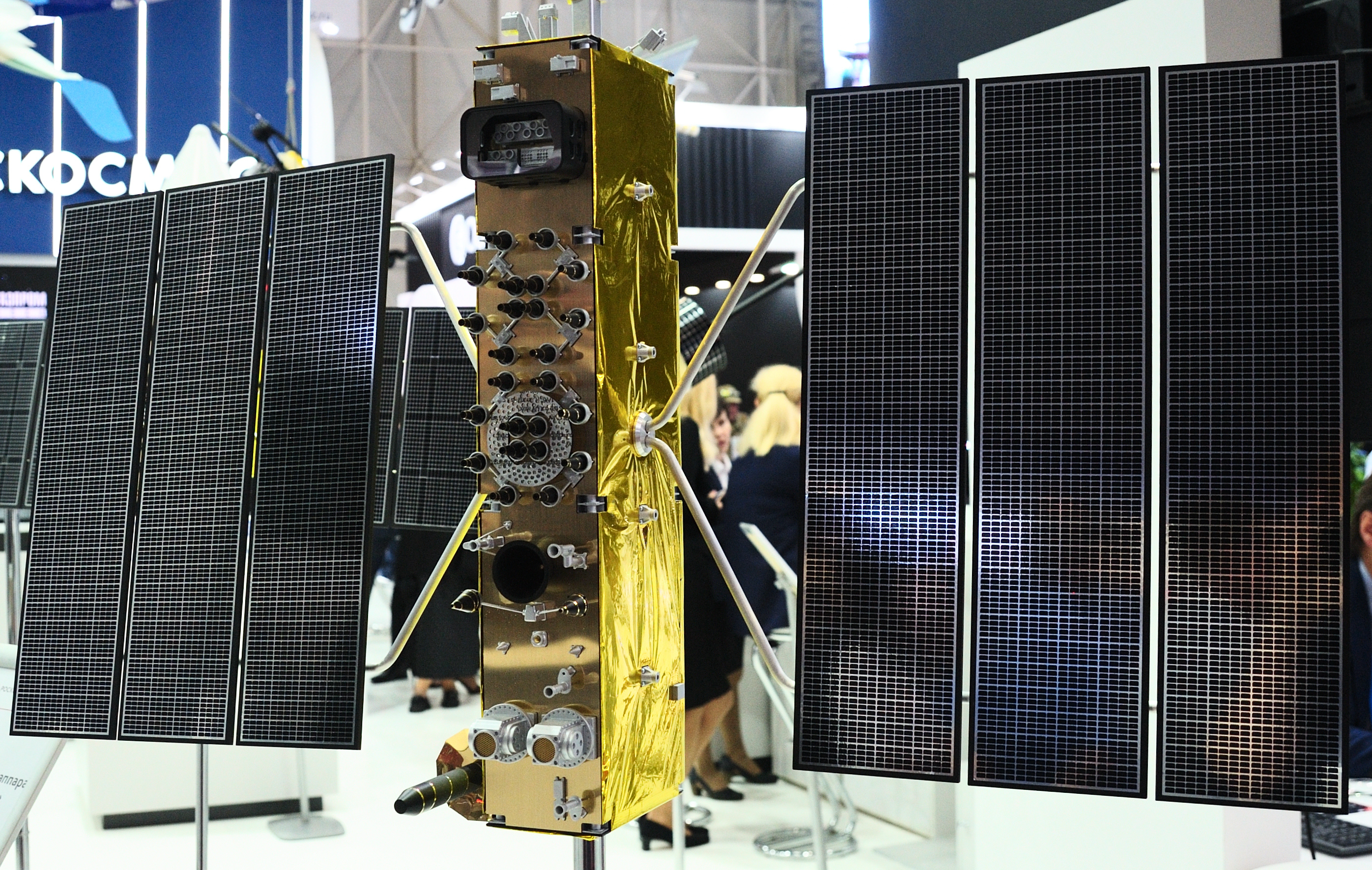
- Glonass-K2 satellite model at the Army-2023 exhibition
- Manufacturer: ISS Reshetnev
- Country of origin: Russia
- Operator: JSC «Navigation-Information Systems»
- Applications: Navigation

Specifications
- Bus: Ekspress-1000K
- Constellation: GLONASS
- Launch mass: 1645 kg
- Power: 4370 watts
- Batteries: Li-ion
- Equipment: 2 Cs + 2 Rb clocks FDMA signals: L1OF, L1SF, L2OF and L2SF; CDMA signals: L1OC, L1SC, L2SC and L3OC; Space Laser Ranging; Search & Rescue (COSPAS-SARSAT); Space Environment Detection System
- Regime: MEO
- Design life: 10 years

Production
- Status: In production
- On order: 2
- Built: 2
- Launched: 2
- Operational: 0
- Maiden launch: 7 August 2023

Related spacecraft
- Derived from: GLONASS-K

GLONASS-K2 is the next-generation satellite design intended to support the Russian GLONASS radio-based satellite navigation system. Developed by ISS Reshetnev (Reshetnev Information Satellite Systems), the first satellite was successfully launched on 7 August 2023 from the Plesetsk Cosmodrome with an expected production period of ten years. It is an evolution of the previous GLONASS-K third-generation satellites, adding CDMA signals, improving accuracy and increasing power. It is 70% heavier and has 170% more power.

== History ==
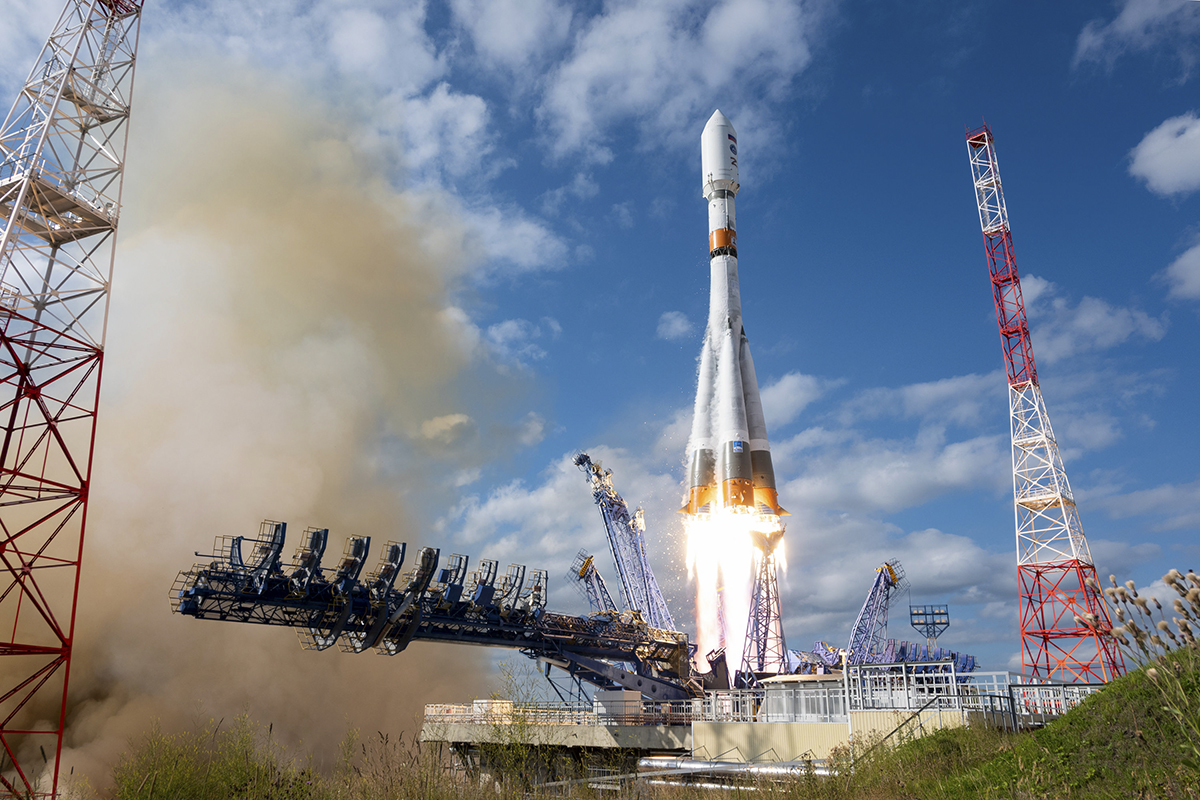
Launching the first GLONASS-K2 satellite in 2023.

The Federal Targeted Program "Global Navigation System" 2002-2011, introduced in 2001, stipulated the development of a third-generation navigation satellite design, called GLONASS-K, as part of the overall GLONASS upgrade program in the time frame 2005–2011. The new satellite followed the second generation GLONASS-M, introduced in 2003. The Russian Federal Space Agency (Roscosmos) initially ordered 27 GLONASS-K satellites from ISS Reshetnev, the developer of all the previous GLONASS satellites. On 7 December 2010, the company announced it had completed ground tests of the first GLONASS-K1 development satellite. The satellite was launched to orbit on 26 February 2011 as Kosmos 2471. On 30 November 2014, the second and supposedly last GLONASS-K1 development satellite was put to orbit as Kosmos 2501.

On a May 28, 2014, interview, Nikolay Testoyedov — president of ISS Reshetnev — stated that production of GLONASS-M would end in 2015, with GLONASS-K being exclusively produced after that final batch. In a December 14, 2014 interview with GPS World, he stated that while the original idea was to have just two GLONASS-K1 prototypes to be followed by the GLONASS-K2 production, the international sanctions limited the supply of radiation-resistant electronics. And thus, they had decided to launch an additional nine GLONASS-K1 as a fleet replacement while they finished the GLONASS-K2 design. In a May 2015 presentation, Mr. Testoyedov expected the serial production of GLONASS-K1 to start flying in early 2018, just after the launch of the first GLONASS-K2 prototype. The presentation showed at least eleven additional GLONASS-K1 satellites flying until 2020. On April 2, 2015, he affirmed that the first GLONASS-K2 prototype was expected to fly in 2018 and feature COSPAS-SARSAT compatible equipment. The first launch was later delayed to 2019, and then further to 2022, and has been launched on 7 August 2023.

On May 21, 2015, during an interview with Izvestia, ISS Reshetnev CEO, Andrey Tyulina, stated that the new GLONASS-K2 were expected to use Russian radiation-hardened components. Given the sanctions that banned the transfer of ITAR controlled parts, the Russian industry had been ordered to initiate an import substitution program. In the case of the GLONASS-K1, the foreign components were up to 90% of the electronics. And thus without substitution, the modernization program could not make modern spacecraft. He stated that the first generation of GLONASS spacecraft was created under such a ban and thus had been an inferior product with just 3 years of expected life. A situation that was not acceptable now. During May 27 and 28, 2015, in Dubna, Moscow region, ISS Reshetnev held a Council on electronic components. They specifically worked out a plan with ISS Reshetnev on the provisioning of high-quality electronic components in compliance with the state-run import substitution programs.

These spacecraft differ from their predecessors in that they possess enhanced navigation functions. They will have a new design and amenities, and more accurate chronometers. GLONASS K2 will emit new signals code division that will provide greater accuracy in determining the coordinates of the users, and more accurate binding in those systems, such as computer systems, where accurate time references are important. Thus, CDMA signals are transmitted at frequencies L3, as well as L1 and L2. In addition, the GLONASS K2 is installed with equipment that will provide functionality for the COSPAS-SARSAT international search and rescue system.

On July 16, 2016, the satellite developer announced that the first flight model had entered the thermal vacuum chamber.

== Satellites ==
Satellite	Launch date/time (UTC)	Carrier rocket	Launch site	Launch block	Satellite type	Serial number	Orbital plane	Slot	Status / Retirement
Kosmos 2569	7 August 2023; 13:19:25	Soyuz-2.1b; Fregat	Plesetsk; 43/3	62S	K2	703	I	8	In spares
Kosmos 2584	2 March 2025; 22:22	Soyuz-2.1b; Fregat	Plesetsk; 43/3		K2	704	I	27	In spares

== See also ==
- ISS Reshetnev (Reshetnev Information Satellite Systems)
