= GLONASS =

Russian global navigation satellite system

Global Navigation Satellite System
- Emblem
- Country/ies of origin: Soviet Union; Russia
- Operator: Roscosmos
- Type: Military, civilian
- Status: Operational
- Coverage: Global
- Accuracy: 2.8–7.38 metres

Constellation size
- Nominal satellites: 24
- Current usable satellites: 25
- First launch: 12 October 1982; 44 years ago
- Last launch: 2 March 2025

Orbital characteristics
- Regime: 3 × MEO planes
- Orbital height: 19,130 km
- Orbital period: 8/17 sd, 11 hours and 16 minutes
- Revisit period: 8 sidereal days
- Website: glonass-iac.ru/en

The Global Navigation Satellite System (Russian: Глобальная навигационная спутниковая система, romanized: Global'naya Navigatsionnaya Sputnikovaya Sistema), usually referred to by the acronym GLONASS (ГЛОНАСС, IPA: [ɡɫɐˈnas]), is a Russian satellite navigation system operating as part of a radionavigation-satellite service. It provides an alternative to the Global Positioning System (GPS) and was the second navigational system in operation with global coverage and of comparable precision.

Satellite navigation devices supporting both GPS and GLONASS have more satellites available, meaning positions can be fixed more quickly and accurately, especially in built-up areas where buildings may obscure the view to some satellites. Owing to its higher orbital inclination, GLONASS supplementation of GPS systems also improves positioning in high latitudes (near the poles).

Development of GLONASS began in the Soviet Union in 1976. Beginning on 12 October 1982, numerous rocket launches added satellites to the system until the completion of the constellation in 1995. In 2001, after a decline in capacity during the late 1990s, the restoration of the system was made a government priority, and funding increased substantially. GLONASS is the most expensive program of Roscosmos, consuming a third of its budget in 2010.

By 2010, GLONASS had achieved full coverage of Russia's territory. In October 2011, the full orbital constellation of 24 satellites was restored, enabling full global coverage. The GLONASS satellites' designs have undergone several upgrades, with the latest version, GLONASS-K2, launched in 2023.

== System description ==
Clickable image, highlighting medium altitude orbits around Earth, (Note: Orbital periods and speeds are calculated using the relations 4π^{2}R^{3} = T^{2}GM and V^{2}R = GM, where R is the radius of orbit in metres; T is the orbital period in seconds; V is the orbital speed in m/s; G is the gravitational constant, approximately 6.673×10^{−11} Nm^{2}/kg^{2}; M is the mass of Earth, approximately 5.98×10^{24} kg (1.318×10^{25} lb).) from Low Earth to the lowest High Earth orbit (geostationary orbit and its graveyard orbit, at one ninth of the Moon's orbital distance), (Note: Approximately 8.6 times when the Moon is nearest (that is, (363,104 km)/(42,164 km)), to 9.6 times when the Moon is farthest (that is, (405,696 km)/(42,164 km))) with the Van Allen radiation belts and the Earth to scale

GLONASS is a global navigation satellite system, providing real time position and velocity determination for military and civilian users. The satellites are located in middle circular orbit at 19,100 km (11,900 mi) altitude with a 64.8° inclination and an orbital period of 11 hours and 16 minutes (every 17 revolutions, done in 8 sidereal days, a satellite passes over the same location). GLONASS's orbit makes it especially suited for usage in high latitudes (north or south), where getting a GPS signal can be problematic.

The constellation operates in three orbital planes, with eight evenly spaced satellites on each. A fully operational constellation with global coverage consists of 24 satellites, while 18 satellites are necessary for covering the territory of Russia. To get a position fix the receiver must be in the range of at least four satellites.

=== Signal ===
==== FDMA ====
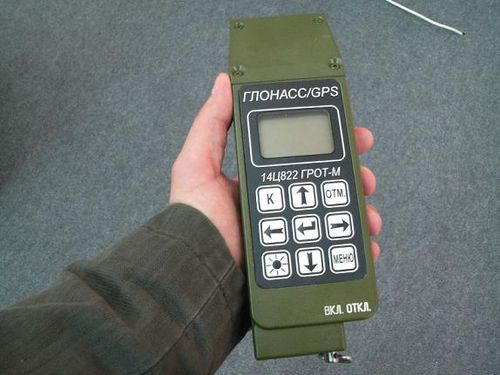
A combined GLONASS/GPS receiver, ruggedised for the Russian military, 2003

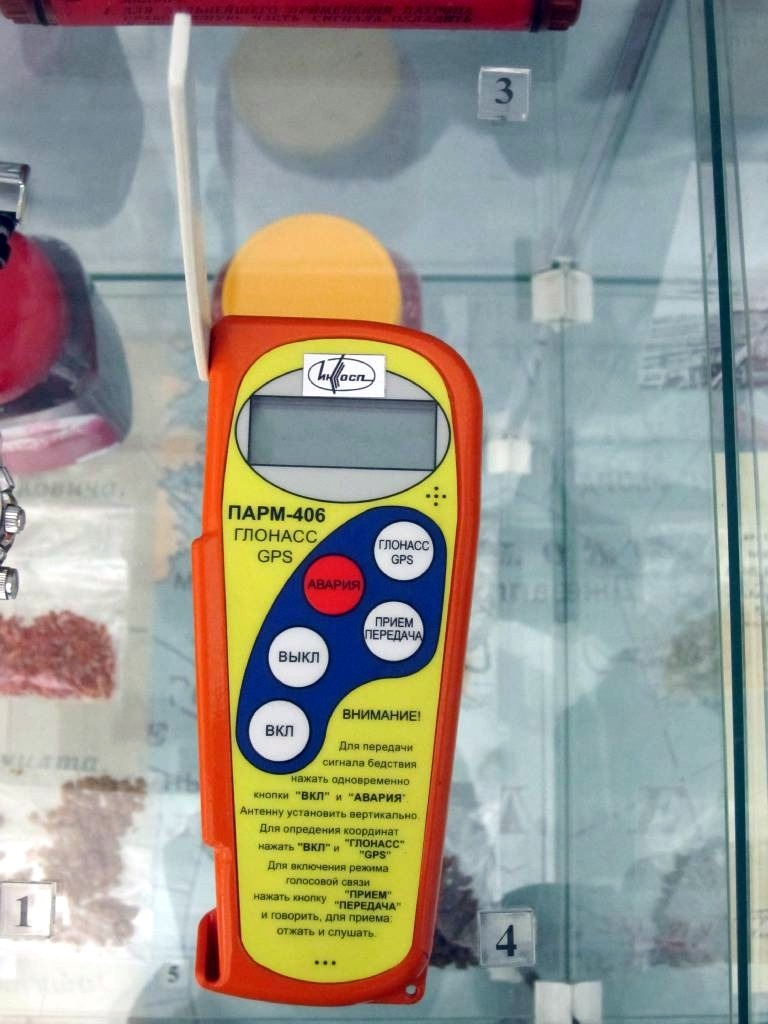
A combined GLONASS/GPS Personal Radio Beacon

GLONASS satellites transmit two types of signals: open standard-precision signal L1OF/L2OF, and obfuscated high-precision signal L1SF/L2SF.

The signals use similar DSSS encoding and binary phase-shift keying (BPSK) modulation as in GPS signals. All GLONASS satellites transmit the same code as their standard-precision signal; however, each transmits on a different frequency using a 15-channel frequency-division multiple access (FDMA) technique spanning either side from 1602.0 MHz, known as the L1 band. The center frequency is 1,602 MHz + n × 0.5625 MHz, where n is a satellite's frequency channel number (n=−6,...,0,...,6, previously n=0,...,13). Signals are transmitted in a 38° cone, using right-hand circular polarization, at an EIRP between 25 and 27 dBW (316 to 500 watts). Note that the 24-satellite constellation is accommodated with only 15 channels by using identical frequency channels to support antipodal (opposite side of planet in orbit) satellite pairs, as these satellites are never both in view of an Earth-based user at the same time.

The L2 band signals use the same FDMA as the L1 band signals, but transmit straddling 1,246 MHz with the center frequency 1,246 MHz + n × 0.4375 MHz, where n spans the same range as for L1. In the original GLONASS design, only obfuscated high-precision signal was broadcast in the L2 band, but starting with GLONASS-M, an additional civil reference signal L2OF is broadcast with an identical standard-precision code to the L1OF signal.

The open standard-precision signal is generated with modulo-2 addition (XOR) of 511 kbit/s pseudo-random ranging code, 50 bit/s navigation message, and an auxiliary 100 Hz meander sequence (Manchester code), all generated using a single time/frequency oscillator. The pseudo-random code is generated with a nine-stage shift register operating with a period of 1 milliseconds.

The navigational message is modulated at 50 bits per second. The superframe of the open signal is 7,500 bits long and consists of 5 frames of 30 seconds, taking 150 seconds (2.5 minutes) to transmit the continuous message. Each frame is 1,500 bits long and consists of 15 strings of 100 bits (2 seconds for each string), with 85 bits (1.7 seconds) for data and check-sum bits, and 15 bits (0.3 seconds) for time mark. Strings 1 to 4 provide immediate data for the transmitting satellite, and are repeated every frame; the data include ephemeris, clock and frequency offsets, and satellite status. Strings 5 to 15 provide non-immediate data (i.e. almanac) for each satellite in the constellation, with frames I to IV each describing five satellites, and frame V describing remaining four satellites.

The ephemerides are updated every 30 minutes using data from the Ground Control segment; they use Earth-centered, Earth-fixed (ECEF) Cartesian coordinates in position and velocity, and include lunisolar acceleration parameters. The almanac uses modified orbital elements (Keplerian elements) and is updated daily.

The more accurate high-precision signal is available for authorized users, such as the Russian military, yet unlike the United States P(Y) code, which is modulated by an encrypting W code, the GLONASS restricted-use codes are broadcast in the clear using only security through obscurity. The details of the high-precision signal have not been disclosed. The modulation (and therefore the tracking strategy) of the data bits on the L2SF code has recently changed from unmodulated to 250 bit/s burst at random intervals. The L1SF code is modulated by the navigation data at 50 bit/s without a Manchester meander code.

The high-precision signal is broadcast in phase quadrature with the standard-precision signal, effectively sharing the same carrier wave, but with a ten-times-higher bandwidth than the open signal. The message format of the high-precision signal remains unpublished, although attempts at reverse-engineering indicate that the superframe is composed of 72 frames, each containing 5 strings of 100 bits and taking 10 seconds to transmit, with total length of 36,000 bits or 720 seconds (12 minutes) for the whole navigational message. The additional data are seemingly allocated to critical Lunisolar acceleration parameters and clock correction terms.

===== Accuracy =====
At peak efficiency, the standard-precision signal offers horizontal positioning accuracy within 5–10 metres, vertical positioning within 15 m (49 ft), a velocity vector measuring within 100 mm/s (3.9 in/s), and timing within 200 nanoseconds, all based on measurements from four first-generation satellites simultaneously; newer satellites such as GLONASS-M improve on this.

GLONASS uses a coordinate datum named "PZ-90" (Earth Parameters 1990 – Parametry Zemli 1990), in which the precise location of the North Pole is given as an average of its position from 1990 to 1995. This is in contrast to the GPS's coordinate datum, WGS 84, which uses the location of the North Pole in 1984. As of 17 September 2007, the PZ-90 datum has been updated to version PZ-90.02 which differ from WGS 84 by less than 400 mm (16 in) in any given direction. Since 31 December 2013, version PZ-90.11 is being broadcast, which is aligned to the International Terrestrial Reference System and Frame 2008 at epoch 2011.0 at the centimetre level, but ideally a conversion to ITRF2008 should be done.

==== CDMA ====
Since 2008, new CDMA signals are being researched for use with GLONASS.

The interface control documents for GLONASS CDMA signals was published in August 2016.

According to GLONASS developers, there will be three open and two restricted CDMA signals. The open signal L3OC is centered at 1,202.025 MHz and uses BPSK(10) modulation for both data and pilot channels; the ranging code transmits at 10.23 million chips per second, modulated onto the carrier frequency using QPSK with in-phase data and quadrature pilot. The data is error-coded with 5-bit Barker code and the pilot with 10-bit Neuman-Hoffman code.

Open L1OC and restricted L1SC signals are centered at 1,600.995 MHz, and open L2OC and restricted L2SC signals are centered at 1,248.06 MHz, overlapping with GLONASS FDMA signals. Open signals L1OC and L2OC use time-division multiplexing to transmit pilot and data signals, with BPSK(1) modulation for data and BOC(1,1) modulation for pilot; wide-band restricted signals L1SC and L2SC use BOC (5, 2.5) modulation for both data and pilot, transmitted in quadrature phase to the open signals; this places peak signal strength away from the center frequency of narrow-band open signals.

Binary phase-shift keying (BPSK) is used by standard GPS and GLONASS signals. Binary offset carrier (BOC) is the modulation used by Galileo, modernized GPS, and BeiDou-2.

The navigational message of CDMA signals is transmitted as a sequence of text strings. The message has variable size—each pseudo-frame usually includes six strings and contains ephemerides for the current satellite (string types 10, 11 and 12 in a sequence) and part of the almanac for three satellites (three strings of type 20). To transmit the full almanac for all current 24 satellites, a superframe of eight pseudo-frames is required. In the future, the superframe will be expanded to ten pseudo-frames of data to cover full 30 satellites.

The message can also contain Earth's rotation parameters, ionosphere models, long-term orbit parameters for GLONASS satellites, and COSPAS-SARSAT messages. The system time marker is transmitted with each string; UTC leap second correction is achieved by shortening or lengthening (zero-padding) the final string of the day by one second, with abnormal strings being discarded by the receiver.

The strings have a version tag to facilitate forward compatibility: future upgrades to the message format will not break older equipment, which will continue to work by ignoring new data (as long as the constellation still transmits old string types), but up-to-date equipment will be able to use additional information from newer satellites.

The navigational message of the L3OC signal is transmitted at 100 bit/s, with each string of symbols taking 3 seconds (300 bits). A pseudo-frame of 6 strings takes 18 seconds (1,800 bits) to transmit. A superframe of 8 pseudo-frames is 14,400 bits long and takes 144 seconds (2 minutes 24 seconds) to transmit the full almanac.

The navigational message of the L1OC signal is transmitted at 100 bit/s. The string is 250 bits long and takes 2.5 seconds to transmit. A pseudo-frame is 1,500 bits (15 seconds) long, and a superframe is 12,000 bits or 120 seconds (2 minutes).

L2OC signal does not transmit any navigational message, only the pseudo-range codes:

Roadmap of GLONASS modernization
Satellite series	Launches	Current status	Clock error	FDMA signals		CDMA signals			Interoperability CDMA signals		
Satellite series	Launches	Current status	Clock error	1,602 + n×0.5625 MHz	1,246 + n×0.4375 MHz	1,600.995 MHz	1,248.06 MHz	1,202.025 MHz	1,575.42 MHz	1,207.14 MHz	1,176.45 MHz
GLONASS	1982–2005	Out of service	5×10^{−13}	L1OF, L1SF	L2SF						
GLONASS-M	2003–2022	In service	1×10^{−13}	L1OF, L1SF	L2OF, L2SF	–	–	L3OC ^{‡}			
GLONASS-K	2011–	In service	5×10^{−14}...1×10^{−13}	L1OF, L1SF	L2OF, L2SF	–	–	L3OC			
GLONASS-K2	2023–	Testing	5×10^{−15}...5×10^{−14}	L1OF, L1SF	L2OF, L2SF	L1OC, L1SC	L2OC, L2SC	L3OC			
GLONASS-V	2025–	Design phase		L1OF, L1SF	L2OF, L2SF	L1OC, L1SC	L2OC, L2SC	L3OC, L3SVI			
GLONASS-KМ	2030–	Research phase		L1OF, L1SF	L2OF, L2SF	L1OC, L1SC	L2OC, L2SC	L3OC, L3SVI	L1OCM	L3OCM	L5OCM
"O": open signal (standard precision), "S": obfuscated signal (high precision); "F":FDMA, "С":CDMA; n=−7,−6,−5,...,6^{‡}GLONASS-M spacecraft produced since 2014 include L3OC signal

GLONASS-K1 test satellite launched in 2011 introduced L3OC signal. GLONASS-M satellites produced since 2014 (s/n 755+) will also transmit L3OC signal for testing purposes.

Enhanced GLONASS-K1 and GLONASS-K2 satellites, to be launched from 2023, will feature a full suite of modernized CDMA signals in the existing L1 and L2 bands, which includes L1SC, L1OC, L2SC, and L2OC, as well as the L3OC signal. GLONASS-K2 series should gradually replace existing satellites starting from 2023, when GLONASS-M launches will cease.

GLONASS-KM satellites will be launched by 2025. Additional open signals are being studied for these satellites, based on frequencies and formats used by existing GPS, Galileo, and BeiDou/COMPASS signals:

- open signal L1OCM using BOC(1,1) modulation centered at 1,575.42 MHz, similar to modernized GPS signal L1C, Galileo signal E1, and BeiDou/COMPASS signal B1C;
- open signal L5OCM using BPSK(10) modulation centered at 1,176.45 MHz, similar to the GPS "Safety of Life" (L5), Galileo signal E5a, and BeiDou/COMPASS signal B2a;
- open signal L3OCM using BPSK(10) modulation centered at 1,207.14 MHz, similar to Galileo signal E5b and BeiDou/COMPASS signal B2b.

Such an arrangement will allow easier and cheaper implementation of multi-standard GNSS receivers.

With the introduction of CDMA signals, the constellation will be expanded to 30 active satellites by 2025; this may require eventual deprecation of FDMA signals. The new satellites will be deployed into three additional planes, bringing the total to six planes from the current three—aided by System for Differential Correction and Monitoring (SDCM), which is a GNSS augmentation system based on a network of ground-based control stations and communication satellites Luch 5A and Luch 5B. GLONASS-KM satellites will also use new L3SVI open signal to broadcast Precise Point Positioning (PPP) to deliver GLONASS High Accuracy Services.

Six additional GLONASS-V satellites, using Tundra orbit in three orbital planes, will be launched starting in 2025; this regional high-orbit segment will offer increased regional availability and 25% improvement in precision over Eastern Hemisphere, similar to Japanese QZSS system and Beidou-1. The new satellites will form two ground traces with inclination of 64.8°, eccentricity of 0.072, period of 23.9 hours, and ascending node longitude of 60° and 120°. GLONASS-V vehicles are based on GLONASS-K platform and will broadcast new CDMA signals only. Previously Molniya orbit, geosynchronous orbit, or inclined orbit were also under consideration for the regional segment.

Roscosmos also plans to launch up to 240 small satellites on the low Earth orbit (LEO) to improve signal availability and interference; LEO satellites will have a limited lifespan of five years to allow a faster pace of replenishment.

=== Navigational message ===
==== L1OC ====
Full-length string for L1OC navigational message
Field		Size, bits	Description
Timecode	СМВ	12	Constant bit sequence 0101 1111 0001 (5F1h)
String type	Тип	6	Type of the navigational message
Satellite ID	j	6	System ID number of the satellite (1 to 63; 0 is reserved until FDMA signal switch-off)
Satellite state	Г^{j}	1	This satellite is: 0 – healthy, 1 – in error state
Data reliability	l^{j}	1	Transmitted navigational messages are: 0 – valid, 1 – unreliable
Ground control callback	П1	4	(Reserved for system use)
Orientation mode	П2	1	Satellite orientation mode is: 0 – Sun sensor control, 1 – executing predictive thrust or mode transition
UTC correction	КР	2	On the last day of the current quarter, at 00:00 (24:00), a UTC leap second is: 0 – not expected, 1 – expected with positive value, 2 – unknown, 3 – expected with negative value
Execute correction	А	1	After the end of the current string, UTC correction is: 0 – not expected, 1 – expected
Satellite time	ОМВ	16	Onboard time of the day in 2-second intervals (0 to 43,199)
Information		184	Content of the information field is defined by string type
CRC	ЦК	16	Cyclic redundancy code
Total		250	

==== L3OC ====
Full-length string for L3OC navigation message
Field		Size, bits	Description
Timecode	СМВ	20	Constant bit sequence 0000 0100 1001 0100 1110 (0494Eh)
String type	Тип	6	Type of the navigational message
Satellite time	ОМВ	15	Onboard time of the day in 3-second intervals (0 to 28,799)
Satellite ID	j	6	The same as in L1OC signal
Satellite state	Г^{j}	1	The same as in L1OC signal
Data reliability	l^{j}	1	The same as in L1OC signal
Ground control callback	П1	4	The same as in L1OC signal
Orientation mode	222		The same as in L1OC signal
UTC correction	КР	2	The same as in L1OC signal
Execute correction	А	1	The same as in L1OC signal
Information		219	Content of the information field is defined by string type
CRC	ЦК	24	Cyclic redundancy code
Total		300	

==== Common properties of open CDMA signals ====
String types for navigational signals
Type	Content of the information field
0	(Reserved for system use)
1	Short string for the negative leap second
2	Long string for the positive leap second
10, 11, 12	Real-time information (ephemerides and time-frequency offsets). Transmitted as a packet of three strings in sequence
16	Satellite orientation parameters for the predictive thrust maneuver
20	Almanac
25	Earth rotation parameters, ionosphere models, and time scale model for the difference between UTC(SU) and TAI
31, 32	Parameters of long-term movement model
50	Cospas-Sarsat service message – L1OC signal only
60	Text message

Information field of a string type 20 (almanac) for the orbit type 0. (Note: Navigational message field j (satellite ID) references the satellite for the transmitted almanac (j_{A}))
Field		Size, bits	Weight of the low bit	Description
Orbit type	ТО	2	1	0 – circular orbit with 19,100 km altitude (Note: The set of almanac parameters depends on the orbit type. Satellites with geosynchronous, medium-Earth, and high-elliptical orbits could be employed in the future.)
Satellite number	N_{S}	6	1	Total number of satellites transmitting CDMA signals (1 to 63) which are referenced to in the almanac
Almanac age	E_{A}	6	1	Number of full days passed since the last almanac update
Current day	N_{A}	11	1	Day number (1 to 1,461) within a four-year interval starting on 1 January of the last leap year (Note: In a departure from the Gregorian calendar, all years exactly divisible by 100 (i.e. 2100 and so on) are treated as leap years.) according to Moscow decree time
Signal status	PC_{A}	5	1	Bit field encoding types of CDMA signals transmitted by the satellite. Three highest bits correspond to signals L1, L2 and L3: 0 – transmitted, 1 – not transmitted
Satellite type	PC_{A}	3	1	Satellite model and the set of transmitted CDMA signals: 0 – GLONASS-M (L3 signal), 1 – GLONASS-K1 (L3 signal), 2 – GLONASS-K1 (L2 and L3 signals), 3 – GLONASS-K2 (L1, L2 and L3 signals)
Time correction	τ_{A}	14	2^{−20}	Rough correction from onboard time scale to the GLONASS time scale (±7.8×10^{−3} с)
Ascension	λ_{A}	21	2^{−20}	Longitude of the satellite's first orbital node (±1 half-cycles)
Ascension time	t_{λ_{A}}	21	2^{−5}	Time of the day when the satellite is crossing its first orbital node (0 to 44,100 s)
Inclination	Δi_{A}	15	2^{−20}	Adjustments to nominal inclination (64.8°) of the satellite orbit at the moment of ascension (±0.0156 half-cycles)
Eccentricity	ε_{A}	15	2^{−20}	Eccentricity of the satellite orbit at the ascension time (0 to 0.03)
Perigee	ω_{A}	16	2^{−15}	Argument to satellite's perigee at the ascension time (±1 half-cycles)
Period	ΔT_{A}	19	2^{−9}	Adjustments to the satellite's nominal draconic orbital period (40,544 s) at the moment of ascension (±512 s)
Period change	ΔṪ_{A}	7	2^{−14}	Speed of change of the draconic orbital period at the moment of ascension (±3.9×10^{−3} s/orbit)
(Reserved)		L1OC: 23	–	
(Reserved)		L3OC: 58	–	

== Satellites ==
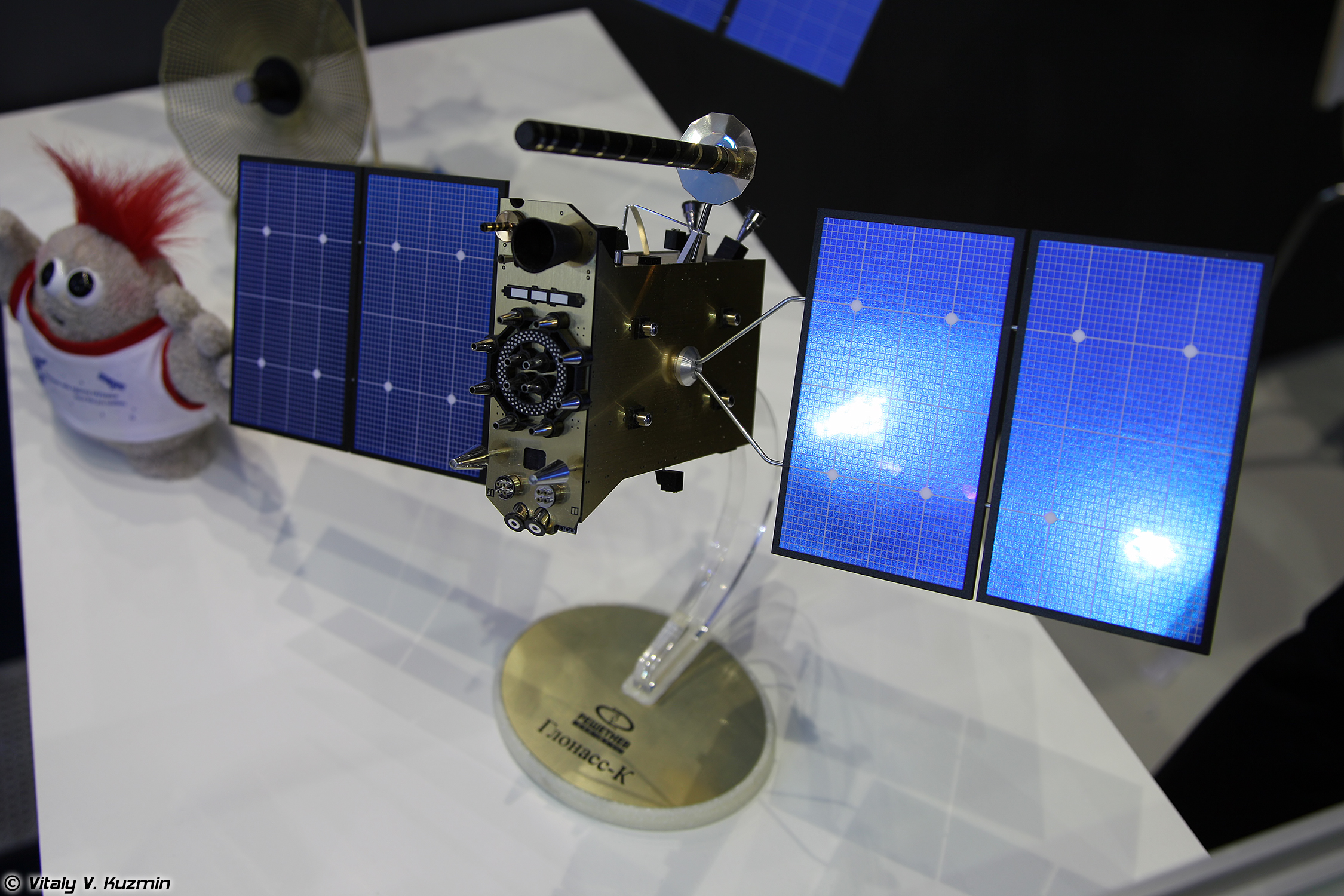
The GLONASS-K spacecraft model

The main contractor of the GLONASS program is Joint Stock Company Information Satellite Systems Reshetnev (ISS Reshetnev, formerly called NPO-PM). The company, located in Zheleznogorsk, is the designer of all GLONASS satellites, in cooperation with the Institute for Space Device Engineering (ru:РНИИ КП) and the Russian Institute of Radio Navigation and Time. Serial production of the satellites is accomplished by the company Production Corporation Polyot in Omsk.

Over the three decades of development, the satellite designs have gone through numerous improvements, and can be divided into three generations: the original GLONASS (since 1982), GLONASS-M (since 2003) and GLONASS-K (since 2011). Each GLONASS satellite has a GRAU designation 11F654, and each of them also has the military "Cosmos-NNNN" designation.

=== First generation ===
The true first generation of GLONASS (also called Uragan) satellites were all three-axis stabilized vehicles, generally weighing 1,250 kg (2,760 lb) and were equipped with a modest propulsion system to permit relocation within the constellation. Over time they were upgraded to Block IIa, IIb, and IIv vehicles, with each block containing evolutionary improvements.

Six Block IIa satellites were launched in 1985–1986 with improved time and frequency standards over the prototypes, and increased frequency stability. These spacecraft also demonstrated a 16-month average operational lifetime. Block IIb spacecraft, with a two-year design lifetimes, appeared in 1987, of which a total of 12 were launched, but half were lost in launch vehicle accidents. The six spacecraft that made it to orbit worked well, operating for an average of nearly 22 months.

Block IIv was the most prolific of the first generation. Used exclusively from 1988 to 2000, and continued to be included in launches through 2005, a total of 56 satellites were launched. The design life was three years; however, numerous spacecraft exceeded this, with one late model lasting 68 months, nearly double.

Block II satellites were typically launched three at a time from the Baikonur Cosmodrome using Proton-K Blok-DM2 or Proton-K Briz-M boosters. The only exception was when, on two launches, an Etalon geodetic reflector satellite was substituted for a GLONASS satellite.

=== Second generation ===
The second generation of satellites, known as GLONASS-M, were developed beginning in 1990 and first launched in 2003. These satellites possess a substantially increased lifetime of seven years and weigh slightly more at 1,480 kg (3,260 lb). They are approximately 2.4 m (7.9 ft) in diameter and 3.7 m (12 ft) high, with a solar array span of 7.2 m (24 ft) for an electrical power generation capability of 1,600 watts at launch. The aft payload structure houses 12 primary antennas for L-band transmissions. Laser corner-cube reflectors are also carried to aid in precise orbit determination and geodetic research. On-board cesium clocks provide the local clock source. Fifty-two GLONASS-M have been produced and launched.

A total of 41 second-generation satellites were launched through the end of 2013. As with the previous generation, the second-generation spacecraft were launched three at a time using Proton-K Blok-DM2 or Proton-K Briz-M boosters. Some were launched alone with Soyuz-2-1b/Fregat.

In July 2015, ISS Reshetnev announced that it had completed the last GLONASS-M (No. 61) spacecraft and it was putting it in storage waiting for launch, along with eight previously built satellites.

As on 22 September 2017, GLONASS-M No.52 satellite went into operation and the orbital grouping has again increased to 24 space vehicles.

=== Third generation ===
GLONASS-K is a substantial improvement of the previous generation: it is the first unpressurised GLONASS satellite with a much reduced mass of 750 kg (1,650 lb) versus the 1,450 kg (3,200 lb) of GLONASS-M. It has an operational lifetime of 10 years, compared to the seven-year lifetime of the second generation GLONASS-M. It will transmit more navigation signals to improve the system's accuracy—including new CDMA signals in the L3 and L5 bands, which will use modulation similar to modernized GPS, Galileo, and BeiDou. GLONASS-K consist of 26 satellites having satellite index 65-98 and widely used in Russian Military space.

The new satellite's advanced equipment—made solely from Russian components—will allow the doubling of GLONASS's accuracy. As with the previous satellites, these are three-axis stabilized, nadir pointing with dual solar arrays. The first GLONASS-K satellite was successfully launched on 26 February 2011.

Due to their weight reduction, GLONASS-K spacecraft can be launched in pairs from the Plesetsk Cosmodrome launch site using the substantially lower cost Soyuz-2.1b boosters or in six-at-once from the Baikonur Cosmodrome using Proton-K Briz-M launch vehicles.

=== Ground control ===
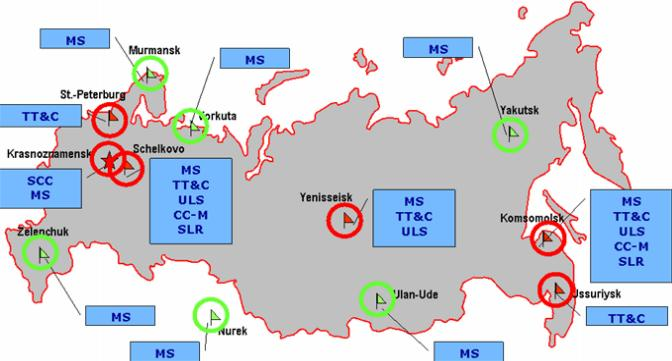
A map depicting ground control stations

The ground control segment of GLONASS is almost entirely located within former Soviet Union territory, except for several in Brazil and one in Nicaragua.

The GLONASS ground segment consists of:

- a system control centre
- five Telemetry, Tracking and Command centers
- two Laser Ranging Stations
- ten Monitoring and Measuring Stations

Location	System control	Telemetry, Tracking and Command	Central clock	Upload stations	Laser Ranging	Monitoring and Measuring
Krasnoznamensk	Yes	–	–	–	–	Yes
Schelkovo	–	Yes	Yes	Yes	Yes	Yes
Komsomolsk	–	Yes	–	Yes	Yes	Yes
Saint Petersburg	–	Yes	–	–	–	–
Ussuriysk	-	Yes	-	-	-	-
Yeniseysk	-	Yes	-	Yes	-	Yes
Yakutsk	-	-	-	-	-	Yes
Ulan-Ude	-	-	-	-	-	Yes
Nurek	-	-	-	-	-	Yes
Vorkuta	-	-	-	-	-	Yes
Murmansk	-	-	-	-	-	Yes
Zelenchuk	-	-	-	-	-	Yes

=== Receivers ===
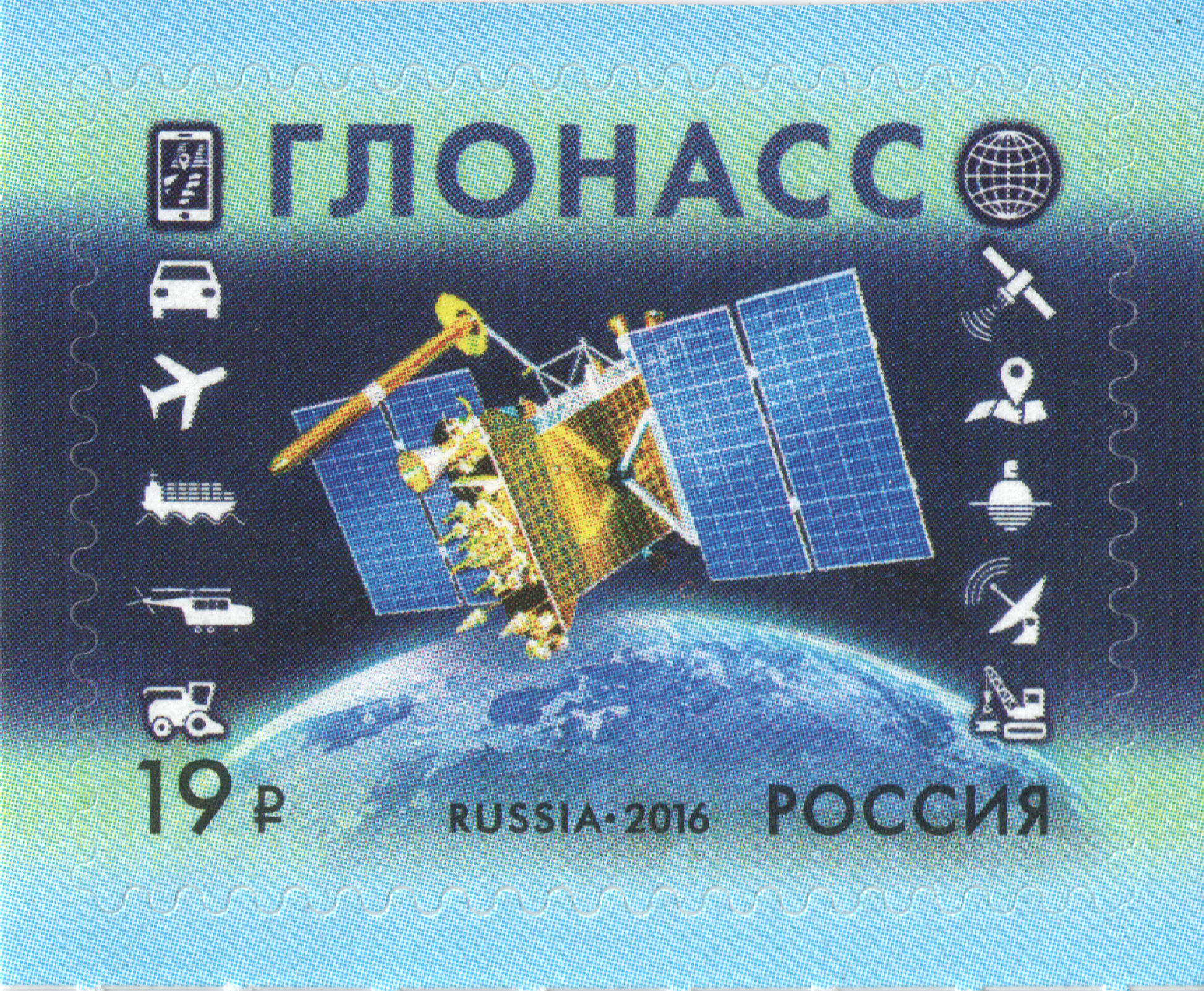
A Russian stamp with a GLONASS satellite, 2016

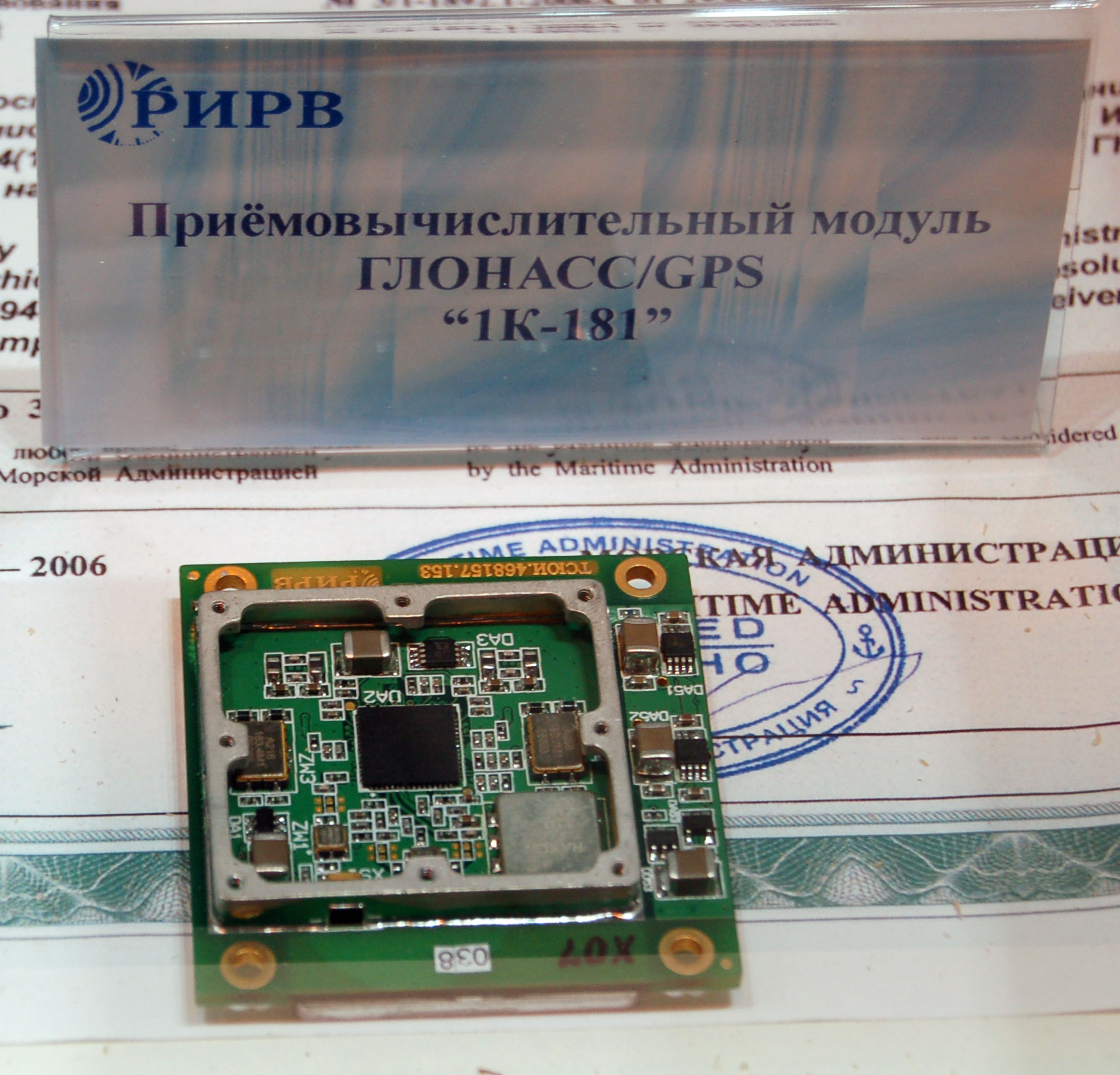
A GLONASS receiver module 1K-181

Companies producing GNSS receivers making use of GLONASS:

- Furuno
- JAVAD GNSS, Inc
- Septentrio
- Topcon
- C-Nav
- Magellan Navigation
- Novatel
- ComNav technology Ltd.
- Leica Geosystems
- Hemisphere GNSS
- Trimble Inc
- u-blox

NPO Progress describes a receiver called GALS-A1, which combines GPS and GLONASS reception.

SkyWave Mobile Communications manufactures an Inmarsat-based satellite communications terminal that uses both GLONASS and GPS.

As of 2011, some of the latest receivers in the Garmin eTrex line also support GLONASS (along with GPS). Garmin also produce a standalone Bluetooth receiver, the GLO for Aviation, which combines GPS, WAAS and GLONASS.

Various smartphones from 2011 onwards have integrated GLONASS capability in addition to their pre-existing GPS receivers, with the intention of reducing signal acquisition periods by allowing the device to pick up more satellites than with a single-network receiver, including devices from:

- Xiaomi
- Sony Ericsson
- ZTE
- Huawei
- Samsung
- Apple (since iPhone 4S, concurrently with GPS)
- HTC
- LG
- Motorola
- Nokia

== Status ==
=== Availability ===
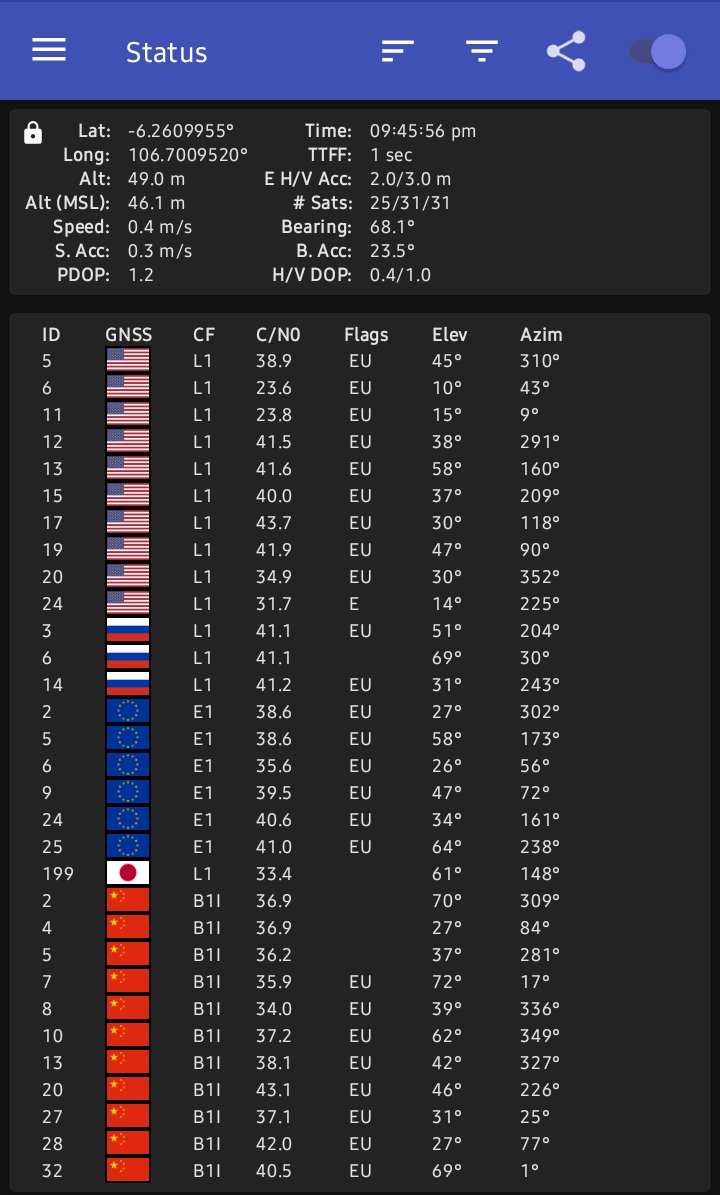
Screenshot of GPSTest application showing GLONASS satellites usage in South Tangerang, Indonesia (2025)

As of 12 March 2026, the GLONASS constellation status is:

Total	28 SC
In operation	24 SC (GLONASS-M/K)
In commissioning phase	0 SC
In maintenance	0 SC
Under check by the Satellite Prime Contractor	3 SC
Spares	1 SC
In flight tests phase	0 SC

The system requires 18 satellites for continuous navigation services covering all of Russia, and 24 satellites to provide services worldwide. The GLONASS system covers 100% of worldwide territory.

On 2 April 2014, the system experienced a technical failure that resulted in practical unavailability of the navigation signal for around 12 hours.

On 14–15 April 2014, nine GLONASS satellites experienced a technical failure due to software problems.

On 19 February 2016, three GLONASS satellites experienced a technical failure: the batteries of GLONASS-738 exploded, the batteries of GLONASS-737 were depleted, and GLONASS-736 experienced a stationkeeping failure due to human error during maneuvering. GLONASS-737 and GLONASS-736 were expected to be operational again after maintenance, and one new satellite (GLONASS-751) to replace GLONASS-738 was expected to complete commissioning in early March 2016. The full capacity of the satellite group was expected to be restored in the middle of March 2016.

After the launching of two new satellites and maintenance of two others, the full capacity of the satellite group was restored.

=== Accuracy ===
According to Russian System of Differentional Correction and Monitoring's data, as of 2010, precision of GLONASS navigation definitions (for p=0.95) for latitude and longitude were 4.46–7.38 m (14.6–24.2 ft) with mean number of navigation space vehicles (NSV) equals 7–8 (depending on station). In comparison, the same time precision of GPS navigation definitions were 2.00–8.76 m (6.56–28.74 ft) with mean number of NSV equals 6—11 (depending on station).

Some modern receivers are able to use both GLONASS and GPS satellites together, providing greatly improved coverage in urban canyons and giving a very fast time to fix due to over 50 satellites being available. In indoor, urban canyon or mountainous areas, accuracy can be greatly improved over using GPS alone. For using both navigation systems simultaneously, precision of GLONASS/GPS navigation definitions were 2.37–4.65 m (7.8–15.3 ft) with mean number of NSV equals 14–19 (depends on station).

In May 2009, Anatoly Perminov, then director of the Roscosmos, stated that actions were undertaken to expand GLONASS's constellation and to improve the ground segment to increase the navigation definition of GLONASS to an accuracy of 2.8 m (9.2 ft) by 2011. As of early 2012, sixteen positioning ground stations are under construction in Russia and in the Antarctic at the Bellingshausen and Novolazarevskaya bases. New stations will be built around the southern hemisphere from Brazil to Indonesia. Together, these improvements are expected to bring GLONASS's accuracy to 0.6 m or better by 2020. The setup of a GLONASS receiving station in the Philippines is also now under negotiation.

== See also ==
- Aviaconversiya – a Russian satellite navigation firm
- Era-glonass – GLONASS-based system of emergency response
- List of GLONASS satellites
- Multilateration – the mathematical technique used for positioning
- Tsikada – a Russian satellite navigation system

=== Other systems ===
- BeiDou – global navigation satellite system operated by China
- Galileo – global navigation satellite system operated by the European Union
- GPS – global navigation satellite system operated by the United States
- NavIC – regional navigation satellite system operated by India, receivable in the South Asia and Western Asia regions
- QZSS – regional navigation satellite system operated by Japan, receivable in the Asia-Oceania region

== Standards ==
- "GLONASS Interface Control Document, Navigational radio signal in bands L1, L2 (Edition 5.1)" (PDF) (in Russian). Russian Space Systems OJSC. 2008. Archived from the original (PDF) on 21 October 2011.
- "GLONASS Interface Control Document, Open CDMA navigational radio signal in L1 band, Edition 1.0" (PDF) (in Russian). Russian Space Systems OJSC. 2016. Archived from the original (PDF) on 22 October 2016.
- "GLONASS Interface Control Document, Open CDMA navigational radio signal in L2 band, Edition 1.0" (PDF) (in Russian). Russian Space Systems OJSC. 2016. Archived from the original (PDF) on 22 October 2016.
- "GLONASS Interface Control Document, Open CDMA navigational radio signal in L3 band, Edition 1.0" (PDF) (in Russian). Russian Space Systems OJSC. 2016. Archived from the original (PDF) on 22 October 2016.
- "GLONASS Interface Control Document, General description of CDMA signals, Edition 1.0" (PDF) (in Russian). Russian Space Systems OJSC. 2016. Archived from the original (PDF) on 22 October 2016.

== Bibliography ==
- GLONASS Interface Control Document, Edition 5.1, 2008 (backup)
- GLONASS Interface Control Document, Version 4.0, 1998
- "ФЕДЕРАЛЬНАЯ ЦЕЛЕВАЯ ПРОГРАММА "ГЛОБАЛЬНАЯ НАВИГАЦИОННАЯ СИСТЕМА", FEDERAL SPECIAL-PURPOSE PROGRAM "GLOBAL NAVIGATION SYSTEM"" (in Russian). Russian Federal Government. 20 August 2001. Archived from the original on 27 September 2007.
- "GLONASS constellation status for 18.01.08 under the analysis of the almanac and accepted in IANC (UTC)". Russian Space Agency (RSA). Archived from the original on 24 October 2007.
- "GLONASS Summary". Space and Tech. Archived from the original on 26 April 2007.
- "GLONASS Transmitter Specifications". Archived from the original on 13 June 2007.
- Goebel, Greg. "Navigation Satellites & GPS". pp. Section 2.2. Archived from the original on 22 October 2018.
- "Интегральная доступность навигации наземного потребителя по системе ГЛОНАСС Integral accessibility of the navigation of ground-based user along the system GLONASS" (in Russian). Russian Space Agency (RSA). Archived from the original on 24 October 2007.
- "India joins Russian GPS system". The Times of India. 29 January 2007.
- "India to Launch 2 Russian GLONASS Satellites". MosNews. 27 June 2005.
- "Joint announcement (in English and Russian)". GPS/GLONASS Interoperability and Compatibility Working Group. 14 December 2006. Archived from the original on 19 September 2007.
- Kramer, Andrew E. (7 April 2007). "Russia Challenges the U.S. Monopoly on Satellite Navigation". The New York Times.
- Miller, Keith M. (October 2000). "A Review of GLONASS". Hydrographic Society Journal (98). ISSN 0309-7846. Archived from the original on 12 October 2007.
- "Radical Change in the Air for GLONASS". GPS World. 22 January 2007. Archived from the original on 10 February 2007.
- "Russia Allocates US$380 Million for Global Navigation System in 2007". MosNews. 26 March 2007. Archived from the original on 21 April 2022.
- "Russia Holds First Place in Spacecraft Launches". MosNews. 26 March 2007. Archived from the original on 21 April 2022.
- "Russia Launches New Navigation Satellites into Orbit". Space.com / Associated Press. 25 December 2007. Archived from the original on 28 August 2008.
- "Russian Space Agency Plans Cooperation With India". MosNews. 12 January 2004.
- "Space Policy Project's "World Space Guide: GLONASS"". Federation of American Scientists. Archived from the original on 3 April 2007.
- "Услуги системы ГЛОНАСС будут предоставляться потребителям бесплатно The services of system GLONASS will be given to users free of charge" (in Russian). RIA Novosti. 18 May 2007.
- "Три КА "Глонасс-М" взяты на управление Three KA "GLONASS-M" have taken off" (in Russian). Russian Space Agency (RSA). 26 December 2006. Archived from the original on 27 September 2007.
- "Uragan (GLONASS, 11F654)". Gunter's Space Page. 16 January 2007.
- "Uragan navsat (11F654)". Russian Space Web. Archived from the original on 3 March 2016.
- "GLONASS News".
