= Aviaconversiya =

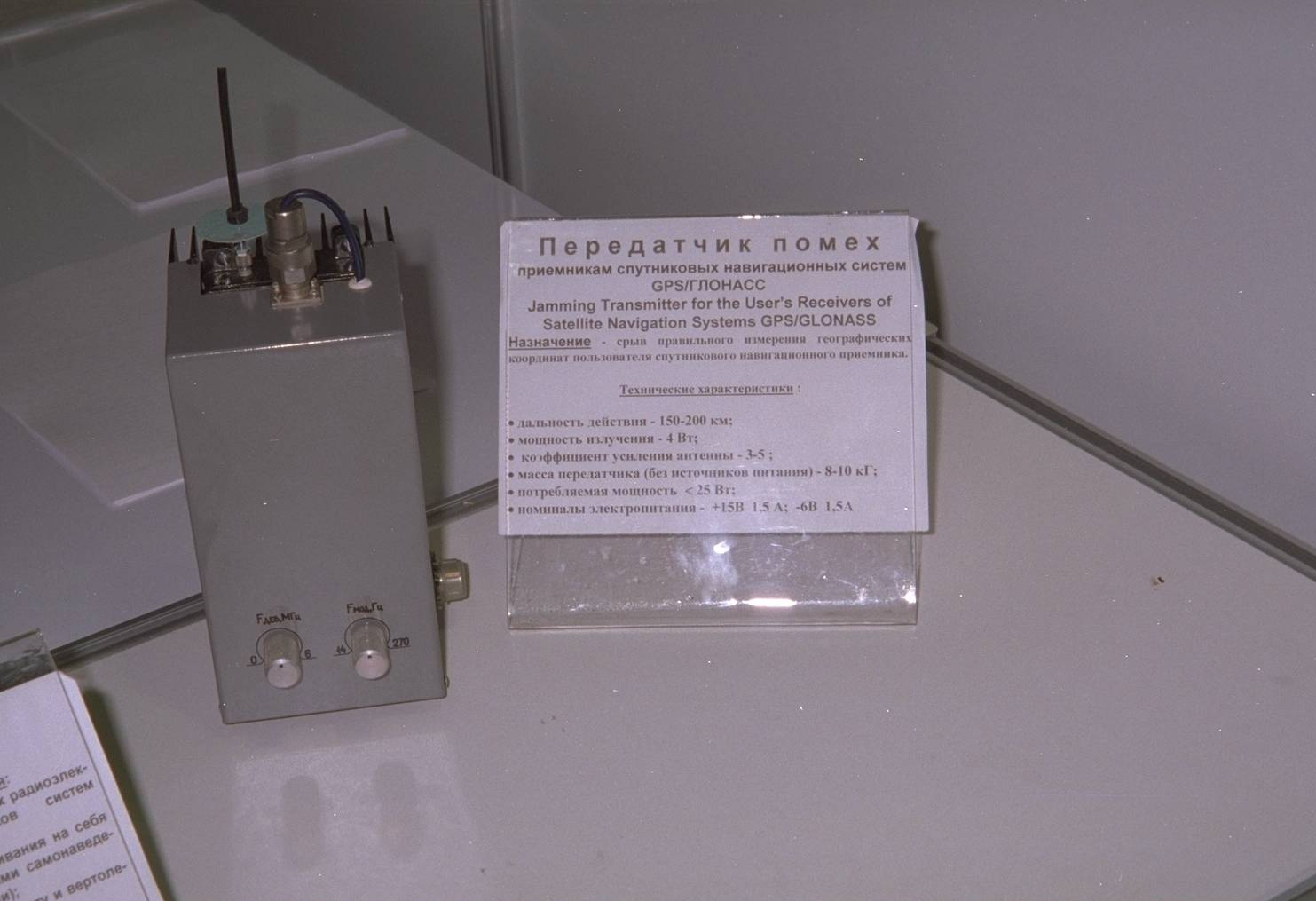
Aviaconversiya jammer

Aviaconversiya (Russian: ООО Авиаконверсия) is a Russian manufacturer of surface-based electronic countermeasures products, namely satellite navigation systems deceivers. Oleg Antonov is the director of the company.

Aviaconversiya was founded in the early 1990s as a private company, and it introduced its GPS jamming device at the 1997 MAKS Air Show. In 2002 the US Department of Defense had bought $192,000 worth of equipment from the company.

According to Western sources, Aviaconversiya deceivers were activated around Baghdad by the Saddam Hussein government of Iraq in order to disrupt Coalition GPS devices, namely satellite-guided munitions, during the 2003 Iraq War. Russian officials dismissed the allegations, as did Aviaconversiya.

In 2003 Aviaconversiya was described by SIPRI as a small company, whose leadership included ex-Soviet army commanders who grew rich on a government monopoly for processing scrap metal from Soviet military hardware.

== See also ==
- Electronic countermeasures
- GPS
- GLONASS
