= Emergency response system =

Emergency response systems are means for emergency response teams to locate and move resources to emergency sites.

== The Russian Federation ==
ERA-GLONASS is the modern Russian system of emergency response, similar to the European standard eCall/E112. The system is designed for use with the Russian global satellite navigation system GLONASS on behalf of the Government of the Russian Federation.

Since 2018, Russian federation is a member of the UNECE Regulation 144 related to accident emergency call components (AECC), accident emergency call devices (AECD) and accident emergency call systems (AECS).

== United States ==
Since 2001, authorities have implemented project E911, which tries to automatically associate a location with the origin of calls to 9-1-1 emergency services. In 2006, the Next Generation 9-1-1 (NG 9-1-1) initiative was introduced. The purpose of the initiative is to afford any emergency caller the opportunity to use any communication means for connection to the emergency services operator, which in turn can receive location data from fixed and mobile phones, as well as automatic sensor-activated devices in case of accidents. In 2010, the system was tested and has become widely implemented. The planning and progress is underway fr a more digital technology under the National 911 Program, under supervision of the National Highway Traffic Safety Administration Office of Emergency Medical Services.

Several states are deploying several response systems for various issues. Georgia has Peer2Peer Warm Lines that offer support from trained specialists to people facing challenges who may not require severe emergency response. Oklahoma shares first responders with tablets equipped with crisis de-escalation tools. Florida is offering a full care service for mental health crisis intervention that includes treatment, from home, drug addiction services and child care.

== European Union ==
In 2001, countries within the European Union implemented the eCall program. eCall is an initiative to bring rapid assistance to motorists involved in collisions and is not designed to allow vehicle tracking outside of emergencies. Some European countries equip trucks with similar devices, containing navigational and communication components. In 2005, Germany began installing eCall devices on trucks with a carrying capacity exceeding 12 tonnes. Trucks in Sweden greater than 3.5 tonnes install the automatic connection devices. The European Commission proposals for legislative acts predicted eCall would be seamlessly functioning in most European vehicles by end of 2015. The deadlines for implementation will most likely be delayed to the end of 2017 or early 2018, as the adoption procedure of these legislative acts by the European Parliament and the Council is not complete.

An eCall equipped car transmits a 1-1-2 emergency call through the Private GSM frequency, to the closest radio tower, to ensure the signal is sent to the appropriate PSAP, as fast as possible. If none of the passengers involved in the collision are able to speak, a minimum data set is sent, including the coordinates of the vehicle.

Since 2018, European Union is a member of the UNECE regulation 144 related to accident emergency call components (AECC), accident emergency call devices (AECD) and accident emergency call systems (AECS).

== Kazakhstan ==
Kazakhstan has developed an analog system ERA GLONASS called "EVAK" – an emergency call in case of emergencies and disasters. It operates using signals from navigation satellite systems GLONASS and GPS. It is expected in 2016 to equip the system board passenger vehicles weighing over 2.5 tonnes, buses, trucks and special vehicles for the transport of dangerous goods, and in 2017 – all other vehicles.

Since 2018, Kazakhstan is a member of the UNECE regulation 144 related to accident emergency call components (AECC), accident emergency call devices (AECD) and accident emergency call systems (AECS).
