= Kosmos 2501 =

Russian navigation satellite

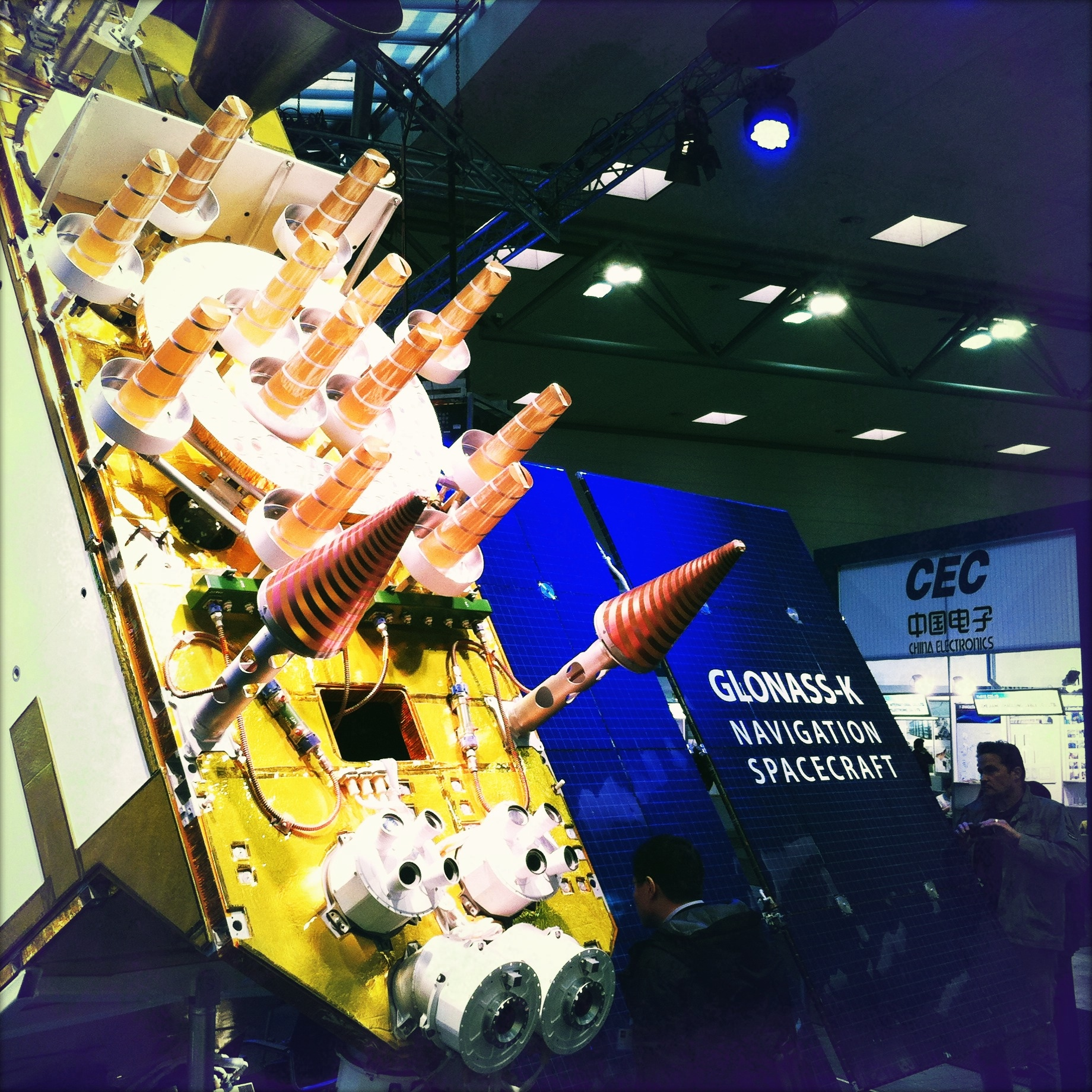
- Model of a GLONASS-K satellite
- Mission type: Navigation
- Operator: VKO
- COSPAR ID: 2014-075A
- SATCAT no.: 40315
- Mission duration: 10 years

Spacecraft properties
- Spacecraft: Glonass No.702K; Uragan-K1 No. 12L
- Spacecraft type: Uragan-K1
- Bus: Ekspress-1000A
- Manufacturer: ISS Reshetnev
- Launch mass: 935 kg

Start of mission
- Launch date: 30 November 2014, 21:52:26 UTC
- Rocket: Soyuz-2-1b / Fregat-M
- Launch site: Plesetsk, Site 43/4

Orbital parameters
- Reference system: Geocentric
- Regime: Medium Earth
- Perigee altitude: 19155 km
- Apogee altitude: 19199 km
- Inclination: 64,8°
- Period: 677.6 minutes

Kosmos 2501 (Russian: Космос 2501 meaning Cosmos 2501), also known as Glonass-K1 No.12L is a Russian navigation satellite which was launched in 2014. The second Glonass-K satellite to be launched, it is the second of two Glonass-K1 spacecraft which will serve as prototypes for the operational Glonass-K2 spacecraft.

Kosmos 2501 is a 935-kilogram (2,061 lb) satellite, which was built by ISS Reshetnev based on the Ekspress-1000A satellite bus. The spacecraft has three-axis stabilisation to keep it in the correct orientation, and will broadcast signals in the L1, L2 and L3 navigation bands for Russian military and commercial users. In addition to its navigation payloads, the satellite also carries a Cospas-Sarsat search and rescue payload.

The satellite is located in a medium Earth orbit with a perigee of 19,155 kilometres (11,902 mi), an apogee of 19,199 kilometres (11,930 mi), and 64.8° of inclination. It is equipped with two solar panels to generate power, and is expected to remain in service for ten years.

Kosmos 2501 was launched from Site 43/4 at the Plesetsk Cosmodrome in northwest Russia. A Soyuz-2.1b carrier rocket with a Fregat upper stage was used to perform the launch, which took place at 21:52:26 UTC on 30 November 2014. The launch successfully placed the satellite into a Medium Earth orbit. It subsequently received its Kosmos designation, and the International Designator 2014-075A. The United States Space Command assigned it the Satellite Catalog Number 40315.
