= Private GSM =

Cellular telephone network

Private GSM solutions appeared after the deregulation of the DECT guard band in some countries, allowing users and businesses to reduce their costs without impacting their performance, and to offer a number of value-added services. These benefits arose from the ability to create private mobile GSM networks, enabling mobile phone users to access the same services and features as users of a PBX extension.

== Current Market ==
Analysts estimate that 40% to 60% of corporate mobile minutes are used in building, highlighting an undervalued pain point. Mobile phones tend to be used more often due to convenience—they are close at hand at all times, provide easy access to stored contact numbers, and are more personal; as such, mobile handsets make employees easier to contact. With mobile minutes costing up to 150% more than fixed line minutes, there is a clear reason for enterprises to encourage change in mobile usage towards fixed desk phones. However, this is in direct opposition to the increasing use of mobile phones as the communications device of choice.

Increasing call spend is exacerbated by a marked increase in mobility, as organisations increasingly move towards having nomadic employees and implementing flexible working arrangements. Mobile penetration within organisations is also increasing, exposing enterprises to inflated mobile spending. Private GSM delivers many of the benefits demanded by enterprises: delivering call cost savings, assisting time-critical decisions by improving reach, and ensuring that compliance legislations can be met. These benefits only come alive when enterprises can highlight real-life advantages through actual private GSM deployments.

== Features ==
Compared to other technologies, the advantages and main features of the Private GSM technique are:

- All GSM devices produced since the year 2000 are usable. Specifically for industrial environments there are more types of mobile devices available that are water/dust/shock proof and have functions such as emergency button call or push-to-talk (walkie-talkie mode).
- The transmitted power and the high receiver sensitivity of the GSM equipment result in a better coverage range and—depending on the type of DECT systems—one GSM basis station can replace either three DECT or five WLAN base stations.
- The GSM band is a protected frequency, which allows any GSM communication to be possible. Therefore, there are no issues with interference from other devices such as game computers, RF repeaters, video transmitters, microwave ovens, etc.
- The system completely supports data technologies, such as GPRS / EDGE, whereby mobile data applications of up to 235 kbit/s per user are possible.
- SMS's (short message/messaging service) between each registered mobile phone is completely supported, as is SMS broadcasting from the central administrator to all users or groups of users.
- Mobile phones can operate as PBX extensions while users are online. This brings many more advantages, such as:
  - The ability to transfer calls among handsets.
  - The ability to make internal calls between handsets.
  - A shared agenda and phonebook.
  - Support for caller ID.
- Corporate phone management and control are improved due to the capability to monitor calls and messaging costs at all times.
- Businesses can connect their private GSM systems to several internationally standardised PBXs, such as Swyx, Alcatel, Siemens or Avaya, among others. Besides this, they can perform connectivity through SIP trunk, x-ISDN-2 or x-ISDN-3.
- Pure IP connection enabled from the enterprise to the carrier via a SIP trunk, the ability to handle voice and data, and the ability to handle video, broadband mobile, etc.
- Supports business continuity—the private mobile network continues to operate when the macro network (public mobile network) is unavailable.
- Dual SIM phone devices can be used to create symbiosis between companies’ existing operators and a Private GSM solution. By using this, businesses continue with the same tariff plan when using mobiles outside of the office and can seamlessly enjoy all the benefits of Private GSM in the office.
- Standard handsets are also supported, enabling easier migration from standard communications system.
