= Kosmos 2471 =

Russian navigation satellite

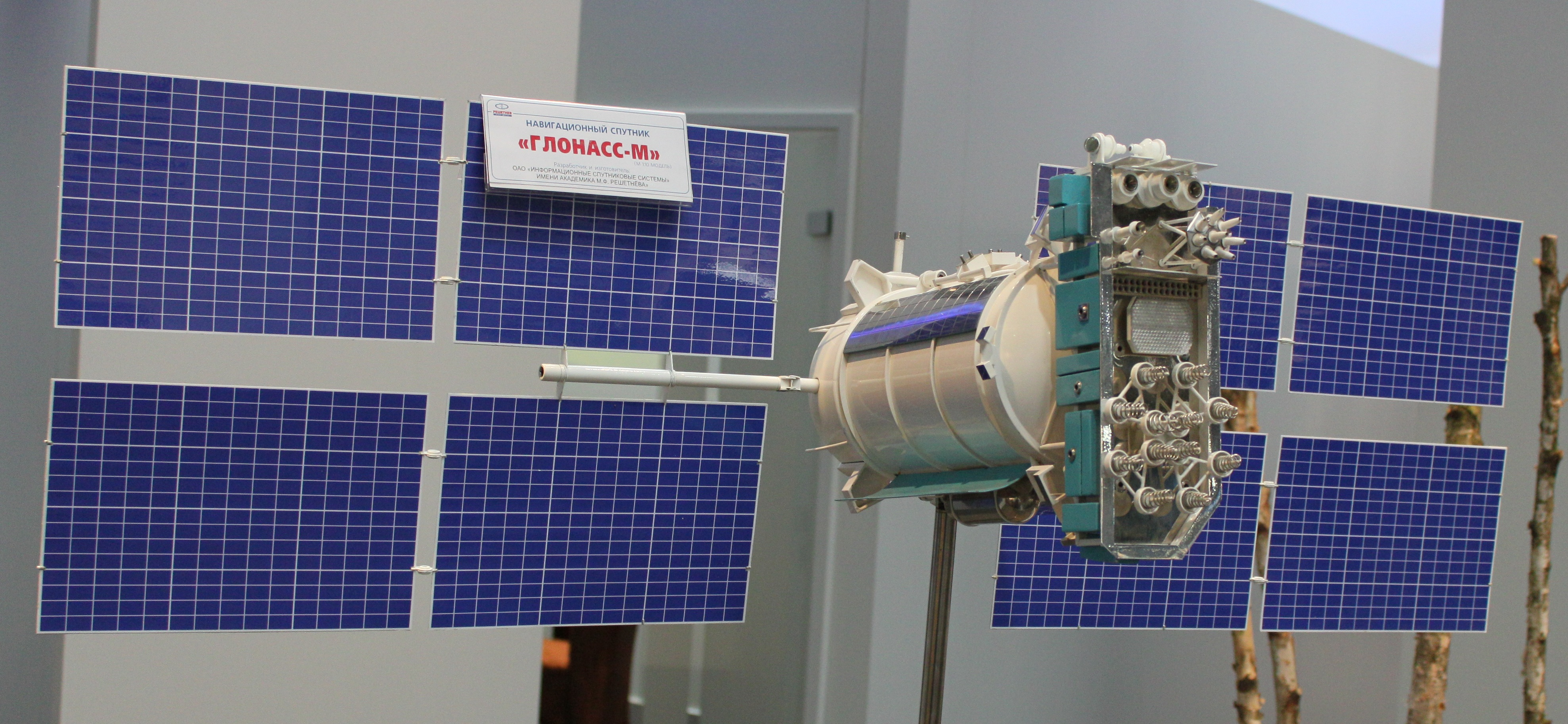
- Mission type: Navigation
- Operator: VKS (to December 2011); VKO (from December 2011)
- COSPAR ID: 2011-009A
- SATCAT no.: 37372
- Mission duration: 10 years, 8 months and 16 days

Spacecraft properties
- Spacecraft: Glonass No.701K; Uragan-K1 No.11L
- Spacecraft type: Uragan-K1
- Bus: Ekspress-1000A
- Manufacturer: ISS Reshetnev
- Launch mass: 935 kg

Start of mission
- Launch date: 26 February 2011, 03:07:15 UTC
- Rocket: Soyuz-2-1b/Fregat-M
- Launch site: Plesetsk, Site 43/4

End of mission
- Disposal: Deactivated
- Deactivated: 11 November 2021, 13:37 UTC

Orbital parameters
- Reference system: Geocentric orbit
- Regime: Medium Earth orbit
- Perigee altitude: 19121 km
- Apogee altitude: 19150 km
- Inclination: 64.90°
- Period: 675.69 minutes

Kosmos 2471 (Russian: Космос 2471 meaning Cosmos 2471), also known as Glonass-K1 No. 11L or Glonass-K No. 701, was a Russian navigation satellite which was launched in 2011. The first Glonass-K satellite to be launched, it was one of two Glonass-K1 spacecraft which served as prototypes for the operational Glonass-K2 spacecraft.

Kosmos 2471 is a 935 kg satellite built by ISS Reshetnev based on the Ekspress-1000A satellite bus. The spacecraft has three-axis stabilisation to keep it in the correct orientation, and broadcast signals in the L1, L2 and L3 navigation bands for Russian military and commercial users. In addition to its navigation payloads, the satellite also carries a Cospas-Sarsat search and rescue payload.

The satellite is located in a medium Earth orbit with an apogee of 19,150 km (11,900 mi), a perigee of 19,121 km (11,881 mi), and 64.8° of inclination. It is equipped with two solar panels to generate power. It entered service by the end of 2011.

Kosmos 2471 was launched from Site 43/4 at the Plesetsk Cosmodrome in northwest Russia. A Soyuz-2.1b carrier rocket with a Fregat upper stage was used to perform the launch, which took place at 03:07:15 UTC on 26 February 2011. The launch successfully placed the satellite into a Medium Earth orbit. It subsequently received its Kosmos designation, and the International Designator 2011-009A. The United States Space Command assigned it the Satellite Catalog Number 37372.

Kosmos 2471 remained in service for ten years. On 11 November 2021, the satellite was decommissioned and removed from the operational GLONASS constellation.
