= GLONASS-K =

Class of GLONASS satellites

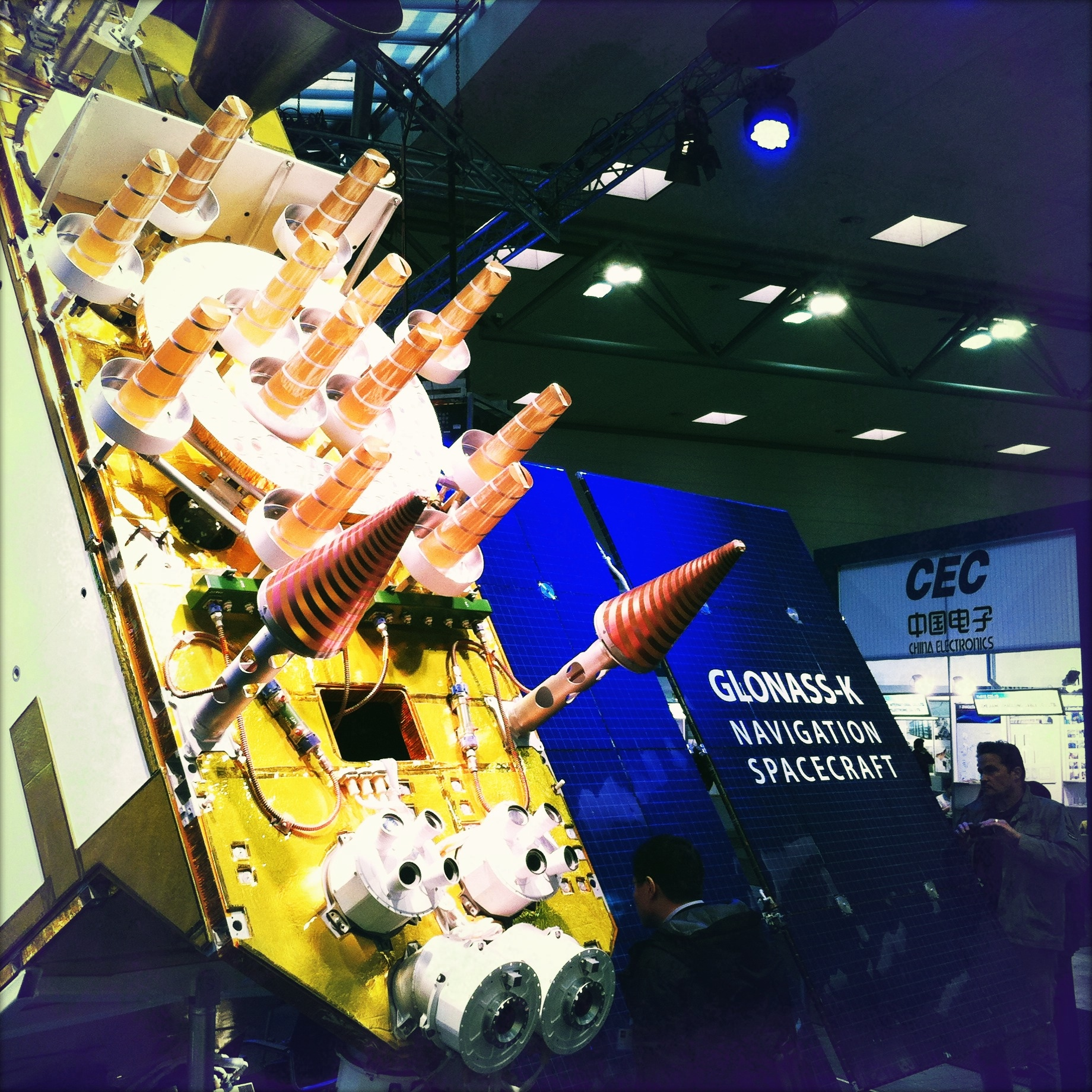
- Model of Glonass-K satellite at CeBIT 2011
- Manufacturer: ISS Reshetnev
- Country of origin: Russia
- Operator: JSC «Navigation-Information systems»
- Applications: Navigation

Specifications
- Bus: Ekspress-1000K
- Launch mass: 935 kg
- Power: 1600 watts
- Batteries: NiH_{2}
- Equipment: FDMA signals: L1OF, L1SF, L2OF and L2SF; CDMA signals: L3OC
- Regime: Medium Earth orbit (MEO)
- Design life: 10 years (planned)

Production
- Status: In production
- On order: 7
- Built: 5
- Launched: 5
- Operational: 3
- Retired: 1
- Maiden launch: 26 February 2011
- Last launch: 24 August 2026

Related spacecraft
- Derived from: GLONASS-M

GLONASS-K is the latest satellite design intended as a part of the Russian GLONASS radio-based satellite navigation system. Developed by ISS Reshetnev (Information Satellite Systems Reshetnev) and first launched on 26 February 2011, it is a substantial improvement of the previous GLONASS-M second-generation satellites, having a longer lifespan and better accuracy.

== History ==
The Federal Targeted Program "Global Navigation System" 2002–2011, introduced in 2001, stipulated the development of a third-generation navigation satellite design, called GLONASS-K, as part of the overall GLONASS upgrade program in the time frame 2005–2011. The new satellite followed the second generation GLONASS-M, introduced in 2003. The Roscosmos initially ordered 27 GLONASS-K satellites from ISS Reshetnev, the developer of all the previous GLONASS satellites. On 7 December 2010, the company announced it had completed ground tests of the first GLONASS-K satellite. The satellite was launched to orbit on 26 February 2011. On 30 November 2014, the second and supposedly last GLONASS-K1 development satellite was put to orbit as Kosmos 2501.

On 28 May 2014, interview, Nikolay Testoyedov (president of ISS Reshetnev) stated that production of GLONASS-M would end in 2015, with GLONASS-K being exclusively produced after that final batch. On 14 December 2014, an interview with GPS World, he stated that because of international sanctions that limited the supply of radiation resistant electronics, they had decided to launch nine additional GLONASS-K1 as fleet replacement while they finished the GLONASS-K2 design. In May 2015 presentation, Mr. Testoyedov expected the serial production of GLONASS-K1 to start flying in early 2018, just after the launch of the first GLONASS-K2 prototype. The presentation showed at least eleven additional GLONASS-K1 satellites flying until 2020.

== Satellites ==
GLONASS-K is the first unpressurised GLONASS satellite — all of its equipment is able to operate in a vacuum. Due to this, the satellite's mass has been substantially reduced: GLONASS-K has a mass of just 935 kg compared to its predecessor GLONASS-M, which had a mass of 1450 kg. The new satellite has an operational lifetime of 10 years, three years longer than that of GLONASS-M and seven years longer than the lifetime of the original GLONASS satellite. It also increased the power supply from GLONASS-M's 1400 watts to 1600 watts.

GLONASS-K will transmit additional navigation signals to improve the system's accuracy. Existing FDMA signals, 2 military and 2 civilian, will be transmitted on the L1 and L2 bands, and additional civilian CDMA signals will be transmitted in the L1, L2, L3 and L5 bands.

=== GLONASS-V ===
GLONASS-V, also known as GLONASS-VKK, is a planned modification of GLONASS-K for use in highly elliptical orbit. Roscosmos plans to launch six GLONASS-V satellites in three orbital planes starting in 2028. The new satellites will improve location accuracy in urban canyons and increase redundancy in longitudes between 20° and 160° East covering most of Russia.

== Launches ==
For launching the satellites, two options are planned: six satellites simultaneously from Baikonur Cosmodrome on the heavy-lift Proton-M, or two simultaneously from Plesetsk Cosmodrome on a Soyuz-2 with a Fregat upper stage. In comparison, the previous GLONASS-M satellites could only be launched three at a time on a Proton-M. The new launch scheme is expected to cut orbiting costs by 50%. The new satellite's advanced equipment — made solely from Russian components — was expected to allow doubling the accuracy. The launch of the first GLONASS-K satellite did however not conform to the general plan, as it was launched alone on a Soyuz-2.1b instead of in a pair.

At 03:07 UTC on 26 February 2011, the first GLONASS-K satellite, Kosmos 2471, was launched. The launch took place from Plesetsk Cosmodrome on a Soyuz-2.1b rocket with a Fregat upper stage. The satellite reached the correct orbit at 06:39 UTC. At 06:44, ground stations established control over the satellite. A Space Forces spokesman told Interfax: "We have established and are maintaining steady telemetry communications with the spacecraft... the on-board systems of the Glonass-K satellite are functioning normally". Successful reception of the CDMA signal in L3 band has been reported by independent researchers.

At 21:52:26 UTC on 30 November 2014, the second GLONASS-K satellite, Kosmos 2501 was launched. The launch took place from Plesetsk Cosmodrome on a Soyuz-2.1b rocket with a Fregat upper stage. The spacecraft separated from the launch vehicle at 01:25 UTC of 1 December 2014.

A third GLONASS-K satellite, Kosmos-2547 was launched on 25 October 2020 at 19:08:42 UTC by a Soyuz-2.1b launcher from the Plesetsk Cosmodrome.

The fourth GLONASS-K satellite Kosmos-2557 was launched on 7 July 2022 at 09:18:06 UTC by a Soyuz-2.1b launcher with a Fregat upper stage from the Plesetsk Cosmodrome.

The fifth GLONASS-K satellite Kosmos 2559 was launched on 10 October 2022 at 02:52:32 UTC by a Soyuz-2.1b launcher with a Fregat upper stage from the Plesetsk Cosmodrome.

== Photogallery from CeBIT 2011 in Hannover ==
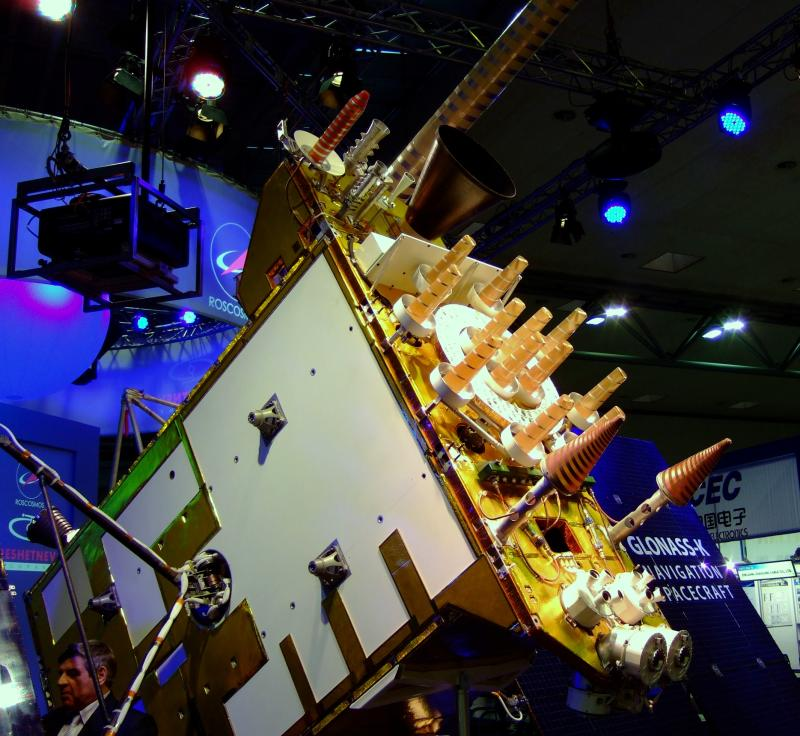
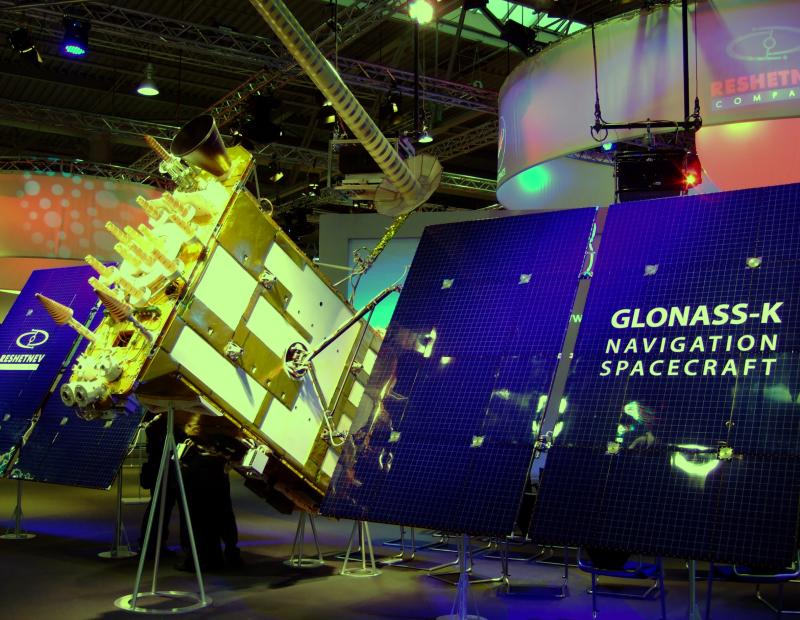
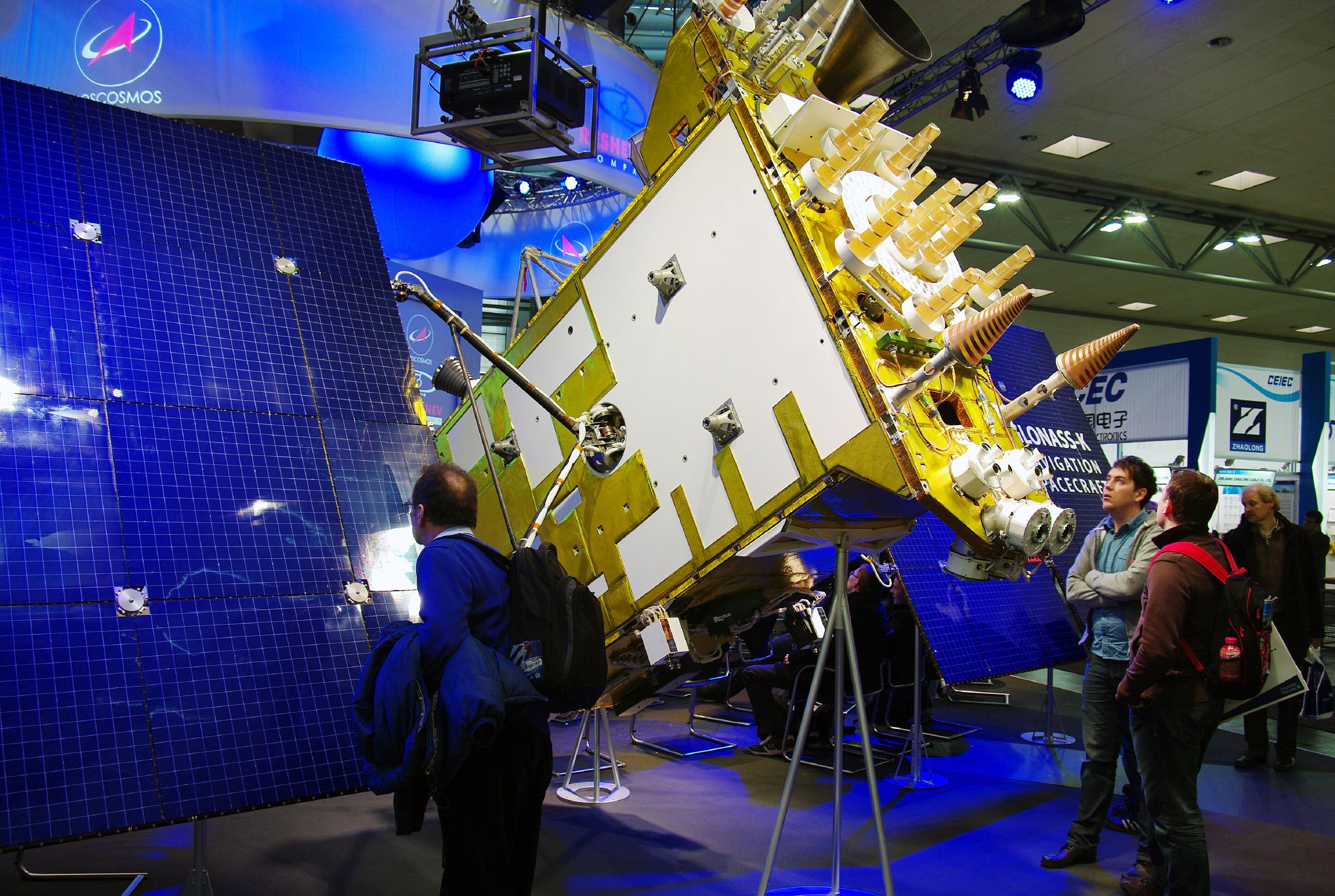

Russia has exhibited the Glonass-K spacecraft during the CeBIT 2011 fair, that took place in Hannover from 1st to 5 March 2011.
