= Unambiguous acquisition =

Unambiguous acquisition is the acquisition of GNSS signals that present ambiguities in their autocorrelation function, namely the signals that are modulated with a modulation belonging to the Binary Offset Carrier modulation class.

Unambiguous acquisition methods have been widely studied, for example in Martin et al. (2003) and Heiries et al. (2004).
