= Composite Binary Offset Carrier =

The Composite Binary Offset Carrier (CBOC) modulation is a particular implementation of the Multiplexed Binary Offset Carrier modulation and it is nowadays used by Galileo satellite signals. It is formed by addition or subtraction of two weighted sine binary offset carrier modulations. It has been introduced as an MBOC variant, following an EU-US Agreement in 2004 on the Promotion, Provision and use of Galileo and GPS Satellite-Based Navigation Systems and Related Applications.

A CBOC theoretical modeling can be found in.

== Bibliography ==
- E.S. Lohan, "Analytical performance of CBOC-modulated Galileo E1 signal using sine BOC(1,1) receiver for mass-market applications", in Proc. of ION-PLANS 2010, 3–5 May 2010, Palm Springs, CA (Lohan2010)
- O. Julien, C. Macabiau, L. Ries, J.-L. Issler, 1 - Bit processing of Composite BOC (CBOC) Signals, First CNES Workshop on Galileo Signals and Signal Processing, 12–13 October 2006, IAS ( Institut Aero Spatial ) Toulouse, France (Julien2006)
