= Saint Pierre and Miquelon Satellite Station =

Ground station off the Canadian coast

Saint Pierre and Miquelon Satellite Station Station de Saint-Pierre-et-Miquelon
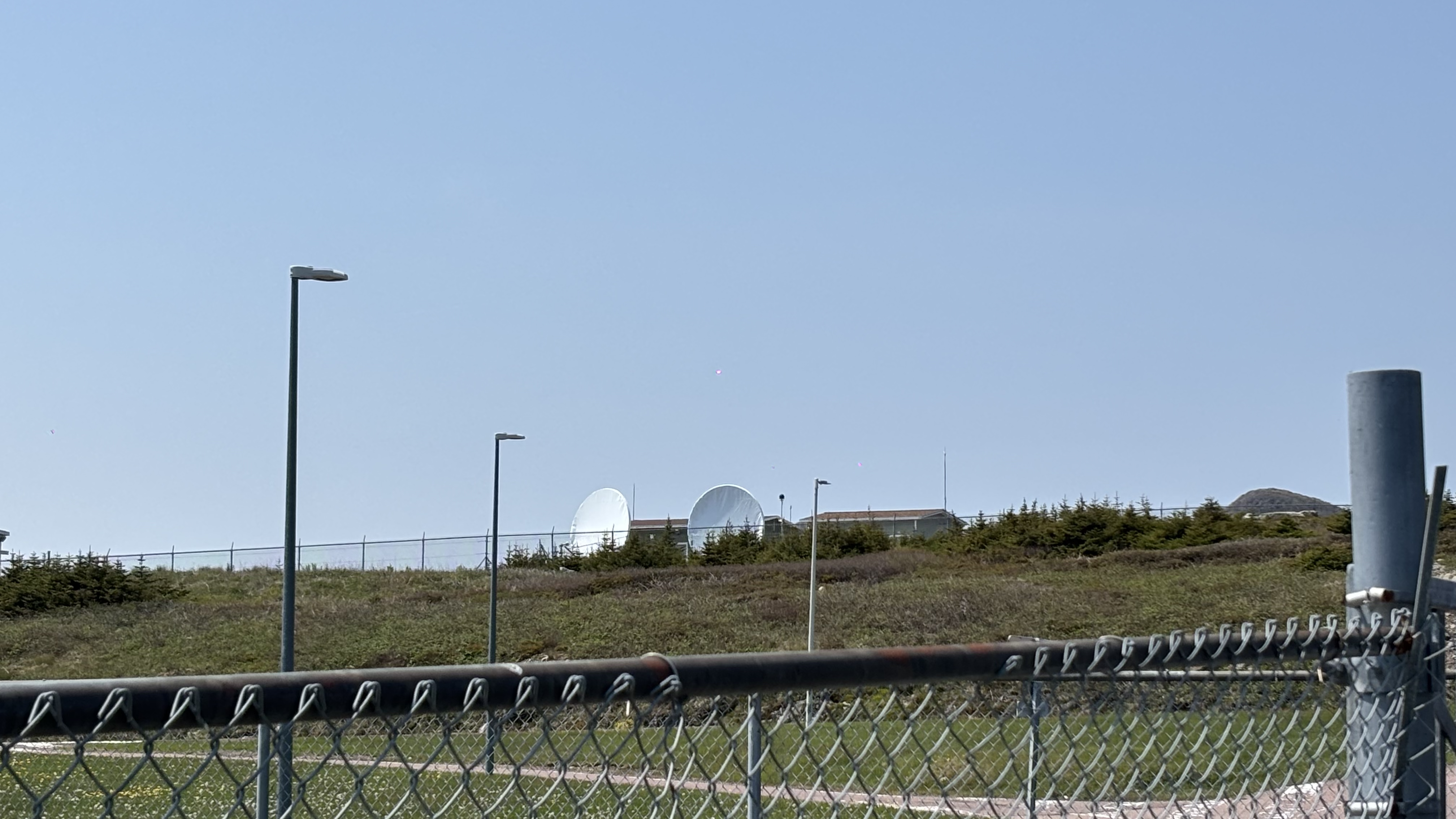
- Organization: EUSPA, ESA and DGAC
- Location: Saint-Pierre Pointe-Blanche Airport, Saint Pierre and Miquelon, France
- Coordinates: 46°45′55″N 56°10′58″W
- Altitude: 10 m (33 ft)
- Established: 2012; 14 years ago
- Main contractor: European Satellite Services Provider

The Saint-Pierre-et-Miquelon station is a French satellite ground station located on the archipelago of the same name, 25 km off the Canadian coast of the island of Newfoundland in North America. It is used for communications with Earth observation satellites, mainly as part of the implementation of the European satellite positioning systems Galileo and EGNOS.

It is one of 19 Galileo Sensor Stations (GSS) on the ground segment of Galileo, and the only one on the North American continent. It is located on a right of way at Saint-Pierre Pointe-Blanche International Airport, which belongs to the French government and is managed by the DGAC. It is responsible for collecting and sending Galileo SIS measurement data in real time to the Galileo Control Centres (GCC) of the European Union Agency for the Space Programme (EUSPA) based in Oberpfaffenhofen (Germany) and Fucino Space Centre (Italy).

It should not be confused with the ESA and CNES trajectory tracking station, dedicated to Ariane launchers, located near the Galantry lighthouse, which has been out of service since 16 February 2025.

== History ==
=== The Galileo Sensor Station (GGS) ===
On 14 September 2012, the Executive Council of the territorial collectivity of Saint-Pierre-et-Miquelon issued a favourable opinion on the DGAC's request to build the station's technical premises, welcoming "the choice of Saint-Pierre-et-Miquelon for the installation of a permanent Galileo site", which would guarantee the European Union's independence from other existing systems, "and more particularly the American GPS". The creation of this GSS station was the subject of a contract between the European Space Agency and a service provider.

On 5 May 2023, Jean-François Carenco, the French Minister of the Overseas, visited the station.

=== RIMS EGNOS V3 station project ===
In June 2018, the European Commission approved the deployment in Saint-Pierre-et-Miquelon of a ‘RIMS’ (Ranging & Integrity Monitoring Stations), dedicated to the EGNOS V3 infrastructure, replacing the current site in Moncton, Canada, and the only EGNOS site in North America. The security aspect of the new EGNOS V3 programme had been put forward as a reason for moving the site from Canada to France, with European Union security experts recommending that the infrastructure be deployed in one of the European Union's territories.

On 26 October 2020, the Executive Council of the territorial collectivity of Saint-Pierre-et-Miquelon, pending the Schéma Territorial d'Aménagement et d'Urbanisme currently being drawn up, issued an unfavourable opinion on the request for authorisation to construct technical buildings dedicated to the future RIMS station with three EGNOS V3 programme antennas on a plot of land belonging to the French government, adjacent to the Galileo site.

On 10 May 2021, the contract worth €2,457,363 was signed between the European Union, via its European Union Space Programme Agency (EUSPA), and the DGAC and its Civil Aviation Service (SAC) in Saint-Pierre-et-Miquelon following a call for projects. A contract notice for site security is published on 5 January 2023.
