= Multiplexed binary offset carrier =

Radio modulation design

Multiplexed binary offset carrier (MBOC) modulation is a modulation design proposed for Galileo and modernized GPS satellite navigation signals, which combines a sine binary offset carrier SinBOC(1,1) signal with a SinBOC(6,1) signal, either via weighted sum/difference (the CBOC implementation) or via time-multiplexing (the TMBOC implementation).

The main objective of the common GPS and Galileo signal design activity was that the power spectral density (PSD) of the proposed solution would be identical for GPS L1C and Galileo E1 OS signals when the pilot and data components are computed together. This assures high interoperability between both signals. Its power spectral density $\Phi(f)$ is defined by

$$\Phi(f) = \frac{10}{11}BOC(1,1)+\frac{1}{11}BOC(6,1)$$

MBOC has two main implementations, the Composite Binary Offset Carrier (CBOC) implementation, currently used in Galileo, and the Time-Multiplexed Binary Offset Carrier (TMBOC), currently used in the modernized GPS L1C signal.

== See also ==
- Binary offset carrier modulation
