= IRIS² =

EU satellite telecoms constellation project

- Country/ies of origin: European Union; Norway; Iceland
- Operator(s): EUSPA, ESA
- Type: broadband satellite internet constellation
- Status: Under development
- Coverage: Global

Constellation size
- Nominal satellites: 348
- Current usable satellites: None
- First launch: 2029 (expected)

Other details
- Cost: €15.6 billion
- Website: defence-industry-space.ec.europa.eu/eu-space-policy/iris2_en (EU Defence Industry and Space)

IRIS² (Infrastructure for Resilience, Interconnectivity and Security by Satellite) is a planned multi-orbit satellite internet constellation to be deployed by the European Union starting in 2029. Initial government services are expected to start in 2030. IRIS² will consist of 330 satellites in low Earth orbit (LEO) and 18 satellites in medium Earth orbit (MEO). It is intended to provide secure communications, location tracking and security surveillance services to governmental agencies directly comparable to the US SpaceX Starshield project. The system aims to also provide broadband for private companies and citizens.

== Background ==
IRIS² is part of the EU's overall space strategy, including the EU Space Strategy for Security and Defence. The European Space Agency (ESA) is responsible for development and deployment of the system and the European Union Agency for the Space Programme (EUSPA) is responsible for the governmental service provision. At contract signing in December 2024, the estimated cost was €10.5 billion, of which €6.5 was public funds. At the start of the implementation phase in August 2026, the estimated cost was €15.6 billion.

== Structure ==
The constellation will consist of three distinct orbital layers: the "MEO Layer" at cca 8,000 km, the "High-LEO Layer" at cca 1,200 km and comprising most of the satellites, and the "Low-LEO Layer" below 750 km, itself divided into the operational EU-managed "EU Low-LEO component" and the experimental ESA-managed "ESA Low-LEO component".

== GOVSATCOM ==
EU's Governmental Satellite Communications (GOVSATCOM) programme, first announced in 2018, is a precursor and an operational bridge to IRIS². The programme pools the capacity of existing European governmental and commercial communication satellites in order to provide short-term secure satellite communications services to EU member states. GOVSATCOM became operational in 2026 with eight satellites from five countries.

== History ==
=== Origins ===
The project was announced by the Council of the EU in November 2022. A single multi-national industrial consortium, including Airbus Defence and Space, Thales Alenia Space and Arianespace among others, was tasked to develop it. The constellation is expected to be launched by European rockets such as Ariane 6. The latter's first launch, initially scheduled for the end of the year 2022, was delayed several times, and finally took place on 9 July 2024. The contract was originally scheduled to be awarded by the end of March but the European Commission apparently put it on hold. At a meeting of an EU parliamentary committee on 9 April 2024, EU commissioner for the internal market, Thierry Breton, stated the commission was still finalizing the contract without providing an estimate regarding when it would be completed.

In October 2024, the European Commission announced that the concession contract to develop, deploy and operate IRIS² had been awarded to SpaceRISE, a consortium of three European satellite operators— SES, Eutelsat, and Hispasat— which would rely on a core team of 8 European space and telecommunications companies as subcontractors; they are Thales Alenia Space, OHB, Airbus Defence and Space, Telespazio, Deutsche Telekom, Orange, Hisdesat, and Thales SIX. The European Commission stated that IRIS² would be funded by the EU, the European Space Agency and private financing, and that the satellite constellation would comprise 290 satellites in multiple orbits, with the governmental services expected to start operating in 2030. The contract with SpaceRISE was signed in Brussels on 16 December 2024.

=== Planning ===
After the February 2025 Trump–Zelenskyy meeting and subsequent suspension of all US military aid to Ukraine, the question arose how much longer Starlink services with its 7000 satellites would be available to Ukraine. However, IRIS² would not be in orbit until 2030 and the current European service Eutelsat OneWeb is much more expensive to use. In April 2025, it was revealed that Germany has been financing Ukraine’s use of Eutelsat satellite internet services for about a year as an alternative to Starlink.

In March 2025, Norway requested to join IRIS² and the negotiations with the EU started on 13 March. Later in March, the Swiss satellite communication company WISeSat.Space announces the creation of a new subsidiary in Spain in order to align with the IRIS² programme. In July 2025, Iceland has concluded talks with the European Commission to participate in IRIS². In August 2025, the SpaceRISE consortium (Eutelsat, Hispasat, and SES) has narrowed the field of potential prime contractors for IRIS² to Airbus (France) and Aerospacelab (Belgium). In September 2025, Poland allocated funds for six secure communications satellites, an additional contribution to the country's commitments to IRIS².

On 27 January 2026, the EU announced that the EUSPA's GOVSATCOM programme, a bridge to IRIS², became operational, integrating eight satellites from five EU member states. In March, Cyprus became the first country to use GOVSATCOM operationally, possibly in connection with the 2026 Iran war or the country's Presidency of the Council of the European Union. On 26 March 2026, Norway and Iceland signed agreements to participate in GOVSATCOM and IRIS². In June 2026, Germany has broken ground on a GOVSATCOM Hub in Cologne, one of two planned physical facilities supporting the programme which is a precursor to IRIS².

On 21 July 2026, Poland formalised a €656.3 million contribution to IRIS², supporting the development of 12 satellites (six in medium Earth orbit and six in low Earth orbit) and the construction of a ground station in Warsaw and later in July, the country signed memoranda of understanding with SES and Eutelsat for development of related technologies. On 7 August 2026, the European Commission, ESA, and the SpaceRISE consortium, after seven months of negotiations, completed a review validating the programme's costs, technical requirements, and timelines. They announced an updated price (€15.6 billion) and an updated size of the constellation (348 satellites). The partners agreed to move into the implementation phase of the project.

=== Implementation ===
On 31 August 2026, SES awarded OHB an almost €1 billion contract to develop and construct satellite platforms for all 18 medium Earth orbit (MEO) satellites of IRIS². SES leads the development of the MEO component satellites within the SpaceRISE consortium. On 10 September 2026 during the International Space Summit in Paris, Eutelsat, which leads the development of the constellation's low Earth orbit (LEO) segment, awarded two contracts to Aerospacelab and Airbus Defence and Space to manufacture 264 and 66 LEO satellite platforms respectively, and another contract to Thales Alenia Space for delivering the communication payloads for all 330 LEO satellites.

On 17 September 2026, the European Commission and South Korea signed an agreement on studying possibilities of the country's future integration with IRIS² and ESA awarded 18 contracts worth a combined €20 million for studies of future applications and missions related to the ESA-led component of the low-LEO layer (below 750 km) of the constellation.

On 30 October 2026, EU and Canada opened negotiations on Canadian access to IRIS² and Galileo. On the same day, the Canadian company MDA Space was awarded a €64 million contract by Thales Alenia Space to build antennas for the first 66 satellites of IRIS².

== See also ==
- List of European Space Agency programmes and missions
- Eutelsat OneWeb, the current European satellite internet service
- Galileo (satellite navigation), the EU's satellite navigation constellation
- International Space Summit – 2026 summit in Paris
