= European Union Agency for the Space Programme =

Agency of the European Union

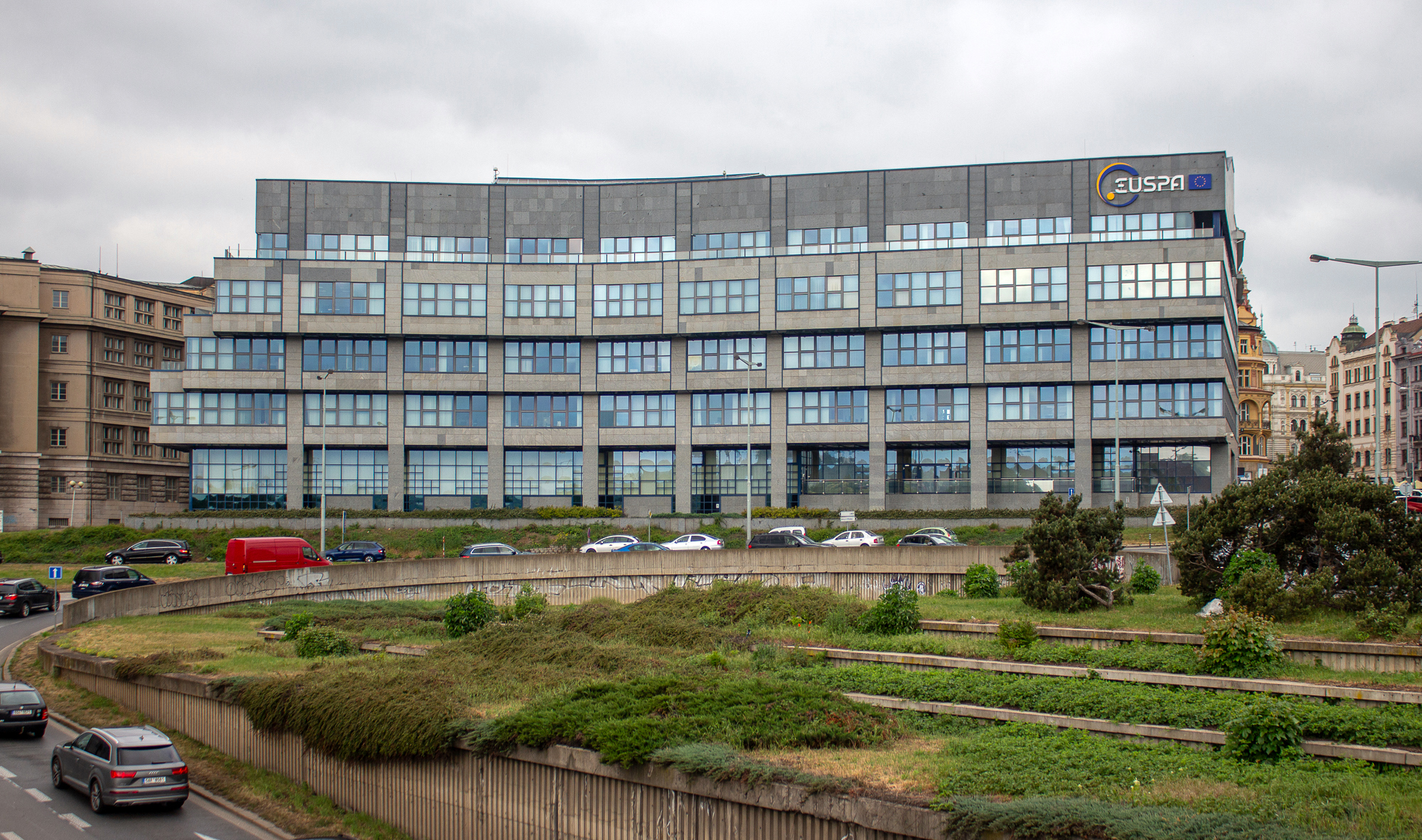
- EUSPA headquarters in Prague

Agency overview
- Abbreviation: EUSPA
- Formed: 12 May 2021; 5 years ago
- Preceding agencies: European GNSS Supervisory Authority; European Global Navigation Satellite Systems Agency
- Type: Space agency; EU agency
- Jurisdiction: European Commission
- Headquarters: Prague, Czech Republic
- Executive Director: Rodrigo da Costa
- Owner: European Union
- Annual budget: EU Space Programme €1.997–2.221 billion
- Website: euspa.europa.eu

The European Union Agency for the Space Programme (EUSPA) is a space agency, managing the European Union Space Programme as one of the agencies of the European Union (EU). It was initially created as the European Global Navigation Satellite Systems Supervisory Authority (GSA) in 2004, reorganised into the European Global Navigation Satellite Systems Agency (also GSA or GNSS Agency) in 2010, and established in its current form on 12 May 2021. EUSPA is a separate entity from the European Space Agency (ESA), although they work together closely.

== Overview ==
EUSPA operates the Galileo and European Geostationary Navigation Overlay Service (EGNOS) programmes with the aim of providing a European GNSS alternative to the American, Russian and Chinese systems (e.g. GPS, Glonass and BeiDou). Unlike these other GNSS programmes, Galileo remains under civil control.

The Agency is also charged with advancing the commercialisation and market uptake of EU Space data and services, including from the Galileo, EGNOS, and Copernicus (Earth Observation) programmes. It does this by publishing critical market intelligence, including the EO & GNSS Market Report and the GNSS and Secure SATCOM User Technology Report, and by organising funding opportunities, such as the Horizon Europe and Fundamental Elements R&D funding mechanisms, as well as the CASSINI initiative.

EUSPA further engages in secure satellite communications (GOVSATCOM and IRIS^{2}), operates the EU Space Surveillance and Tracking (EU SST) Front Desk, and is responsible for the security accreditation of all EU Space Programme components.

== History and funding ==
Established in 2004 as the European GNSS Supervisory Authority (GSA), reorganised in 2010 into the European GNSS Agency (also GSA), and based in Prague, Czech Republic, since 1 September 2012, the agency was initially responsible for managing and monitoring the use of the Galileo programme’s funds and dealing with any matters relating to satellite radio-navigation.

In June 2018, the European Commission proposed to transform the European GNSS Agency into the European Union Agency for the Space Programme (EUSPA), aggregating and consolidating the agency's roles for Galileo and EGNOS; Copernicus, Europe’s Earth Observation programme; and a new Governmental Satellite Communication (GOVSATCOM) initiative.

In December 2020, the European Commission welcomed the political agreement between the European Parliament and the Council of the European Union on the EU Space Programme. On 28 April 2021, the European Parliament approved the update of the EU Space Programme regulation, paving the way to the creation of the European Union Agency for the Space Programme (EUSPA).

The regulation creates the European Union Agency for the Space Programme, defines its competences and functioning, as well as a budget of 14.872 million euros within the 2021–2027 multiannual financial framework, the highest amount ever committed by Brussels for space programmes. It entered into force on 12 May 2021.

EUSPA has been responsible for the EU Space Programme’s SST Front Desk operations since 1 July 2023.

== EU's relationship with the European Space Agency (ESA) ==
The initial aim of the European Union (EU) was to integrate the European Space Agency (ESA) as an agency of the EU by 2014. While the EU and its member states fund together 86% of ESA’s budget, it is not an EU agency.

ESA is partnered with the EU on its two current flagship space programmes, the Copernicus Earth Observation system and the Galileo satellite navigation system, with ESA providing technical oversight and, in the case of Copernicus, some of the funding. The EU has, however, shown an interest in expanding into new areas, hence the decision to rename and expand the European GNSS Agency into the EU Agency for the Space Programme. The proposal drew strong criticism from ESA and many ESA and EU member states, as it was perceived as encroaching on ESA's turf.

In January 2021, after years of acrimonious relations, EU and ESA officials mended their relationship, with the EU Internal Market Commissioner Thierry Breton saying at the time: "The European space policy will continue to rely on ESA and its unique technical, engineering and science expertise” and that ESA will continue to be the European agency for space matters. “If we are to be successful in our European strategy for space, and we will be, I will need ESA by my side,” added Commissioner Breton. ESA director Josef Aschbacher reciprocated, saying, "I would really like to make ESA the main agency, the go-to agency of the European Commission for all its flagship programmes."

ESA and EUSPA are now seen to have distinct roles and competencies, which is officialised in the Financial Framework Partnership Agreement (FFPA). Whereas ESA's focus is on the design and development of technical elements of the EU space programmes, EUSPA handles the operational elements of those programmes.

== The European GNSS Service Centre (GSC), Madrid ==
The European GNSS Service Centre (GSC) is an integral part of the European GNSS infrastructure, which represents the interface between the Galileo system and the users of the Galileo services. The GNSS Service Centre is located in Madrid, in the facilities of the Spanish National Aerospace Institute (INTA), in Torrejón de Ardoz.

The GSC acts as an interface between the Galileo system and Open Service (OS) users, as well as between the commercial service providers and / or users. It also provides users with High Accuracy Service (HAS) performance assessment and notifications, as well as access to certified public keys for users of the Open Service Navigation Message Authentication (OSNMA).

The GSC sets up a competence centre for OS, OSNMA and HAS service aspects, which are accessible to users via the user help desk and the web portal. The information is provided by a communication platform, an electronic library with Galileo and GNSS reference documentation, as well as by the ad hoc provision of specific Galileo information.

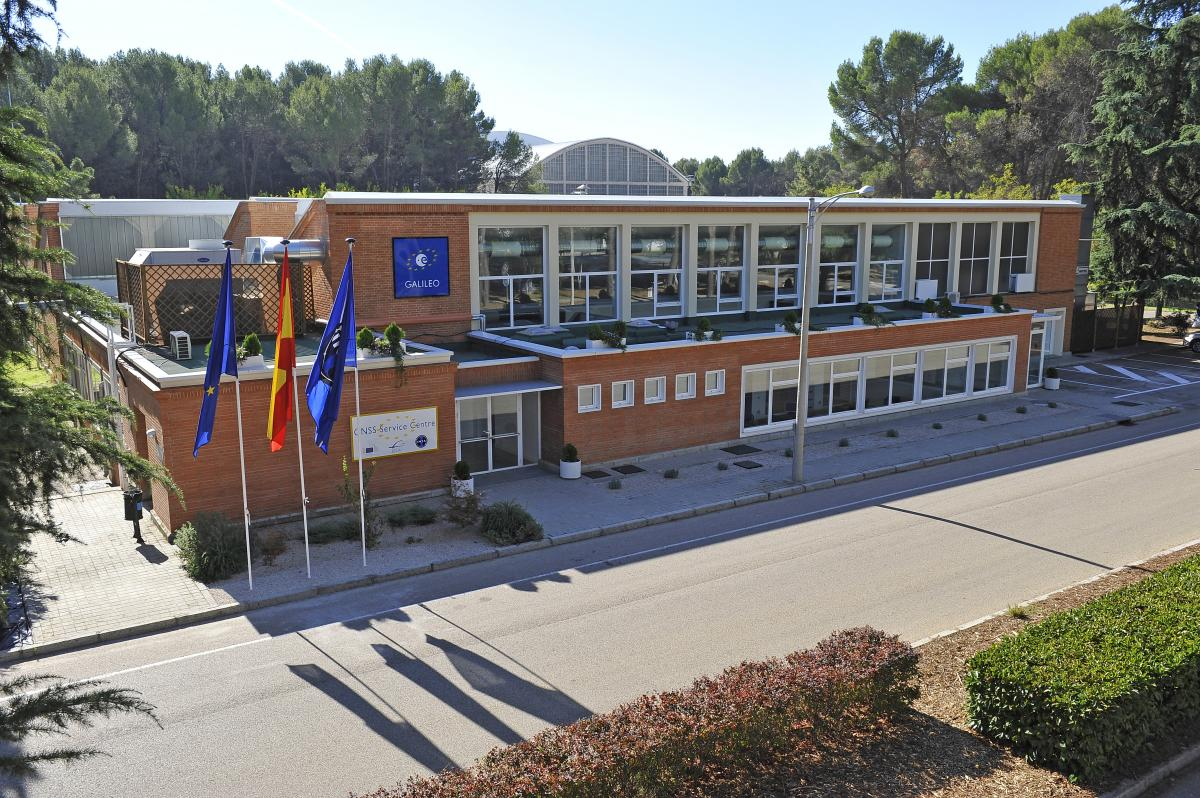
GSC facilities in Madrid

=== History ===
The European GNSS Service Centre (GSC) was inaugurated in May 2013 by then vice-president of the European Commission Antonio Tajani, Commissioner for Industry and Entrepreneurship, and the Spanish Minister of Development Ana Pastor. The Centre itself was named Loyola de Palacio in tribute to the former European Commission Vice President, then Commissioner for Transport.

On 17 March 2011, a Memorandum of Understanding (MoU) was signed by Commissioner Tajani and the Spanish Minister of Transport José Blanco López. This MoU outlined the conditions and requirements for hosting the GSC in Spain and for conducting a Spanish study to prepare the centre. The GSC deployment agreement was published in the Official Journal of the European Union on 23 February 2012, which stated that the global network of ground stations as part of the Galileo programme included six centres and one station, of which the GSC is one (MCC, GSMC, GSC, GRC).

=== Area of responsibility ===
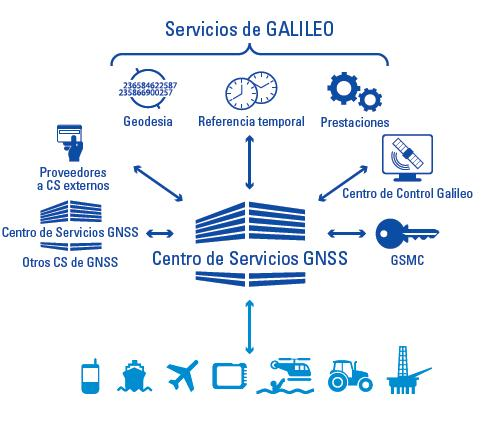
GSC concept

The GSC provides the following services:

1. The GSC offers services for the user community via a web portal and a user help desk. A dedicated website (www.gsc-europa.eu) is available to Galileo users.
2. Distribution of timely service information: information about the system, system status and other messages for users.
3. Support for service provision: exchange of R&D and industry knowledge of individual market segments.
4. Provision of current information and performance reports regarding the programme status.
5. Application and product developers with access to market experts in key segments.
6. Provision of basic services for the user community via a web portal and a user help desk.
7. Exchange of R&D and industry knowledge per market segment.
8. Information about the programme status and ICD documents (Interface Control Document).
9. Access to market experts in key segments.

== EUSPA sites ==
Although its Headquarters are in Prague, Czech Republic, EUSPA is a multi-site agency, with different sites located across several EU countries. This set-up ensures the effective management and coordination of the EU Space components and projects under the Agency’s responsibility.

The European GNSS Service Centre

Located in Madrid, Spain, the GSC is an integral part of the European GNSS infrastructure and provides the single interface between the Galileo system and the users of the Galileo Open Service (OS), Open Service Navigation Message Authentication Service (OSNMA) and the High Accuracy Service (HAS).

Galileo Security Monitoring Centre

The Galileo Security Monitoring Centre (GSMC) monitors and, when necessary, takes action regarding security threats, security alerts and the operational status of Galileo’s various components. It does this from both its main facility in Saint-Germain-en-Laye, France, and from its backup facility in Saint Martin de la Vega, Spain.

The Saint Martin de la Vega site also host the EU SST (Space Surveillance and Tracking) Front Desk.

Galileo Reference Centre

Located in Noordwijk, the Netherlands, the Galileo Reference Centre (GRC) monitors the performance of the Galileo signals.

Galileo Control Centres

With locations in both Fucino, Italy and Oberpfaffenhofen, Germany, the Galileo Control Centres (GCC) calculate the orbit of Galileo satellites with an accuracy of 10 cm. They generate and transmit the navigation signal that is used in, for example, smartphones and vehicles, and ensure its quality and accuracy.

Galileo Integrated Logistic Support Centre

Based at the GALAXIA European Space Applications Park in Transinne, Belgium, the Galileo Integrated Logistics Support (ILS) Centre supports an efficient spare part and repair provisioning service for the Galileo ground infrastructure.

Galileo Sensor Stations

These Centres are complemented by a range of instruments, including Galileo Sensor Stations (GSS). GSS can be found in some of the world’s most remote locations, including the Kerguelen Islands, Wallis and Futuna and Bonnaire. They are all on European Union territory, even if located in the sub-Antarctic or the South Pacific.

EUSPA also has a Search & Rescue (SAR)/Galileo Service Centre (SGSC) and EGNOS Centre in Toulouse, France, as well as a Joint Office in Brussels, Belgium.
