= Galileo (satellite navigation system) =

European global navigation satellite system

- Country/ies of origin: European Union
- Operator(s): EUSPA, ESA
- Type: Civilian, commercial
- Status: Initial services
- Coverage: Global
- Accuracy: 20 cm (public since 24 January 2023)

Constellation size
- Nominal satellites: 24
- Current usable satellites: 28
- First launch: 28 December 2005
- Last launch: 17 December 2025
- Total launches: 16

Orbital characteristics
- Regime: 3 × MEO planes
- Orbital height: 23222 km
- Orbital period: 10/17 sd (about 14 hours 4 minutes 45 seconds)
- Revisit period: 10 sidereal days

Other details
- Cost: €10 billion (initial constellation)
- Website: gsc-europa.eu (European GNSS Service Centre)

Galileo is a global navigation satellite system (GNSS) created by the European Union through the European Space Agency (ESA) and operated by the European Union Agency for the Space Programme (EUSPA). It is headquartered in Prague in Czechia, with two ground operations centres in Oberpfaffenhofen, Germany (mostly responsible for the control of the satellites), and in Fucino, Italy (mostly responsible for providing the navigation data). The €10 billion project began offering limited services in 2016. It is named after the Italian astronomer Galileo Galilei.

One of the aims of Galileo is to provide an independent high-precision positioning system so European political and military authorities do not have to rely on the United States GPS or the Russian GLONASS systems, which could be disabled or degraded by their operators at any time. The use of basic (lower-precision) Galileo services is free and open to everyone. A higher-precision service is available for free since 24 January 2023, what had previously been only available to government-authorized users. Galileo is also to provide a new global search and rescue (SAR) function as part of the MEOSAR system.

The second Galileo test satellite GIOVE-A was launched 28 December 2005, while the first satellite to be part of the operational system was launched on 21 October 2011. Galileo started offering Early Operational Capability (EOC) on 15 December 2016, providing initial services with a weak signal. In October 2018, four more Galileo satellites were brought online, increasing the number of active satellites to 18. In November 2018, the FCC approved use of Galileo in the US. As of September 2024, there are 25 launched satellites that operate in the constellation. It is expected that the next generation of satellites will begin to become operational after 2026 to replace the first generation, which can then be used for backup capabilities. Most satellites of the programme were built by OHB in Bremen, Germany, with the contribution of Surrey Satellite Technology (SSTL) in Guildford, United Kingdom.

The Galileo system has a greater horizontal accuracy than GPS in certain locations, having an accuracy of less than 1 m when using broadcast ephemeris (GPS: 3 m) and a signal-in-space ranging error (SISRE) of 1.6 cm (GPS: 2.3 cm) when using real-time corrections for satellite orbits and clocks.

== History ==
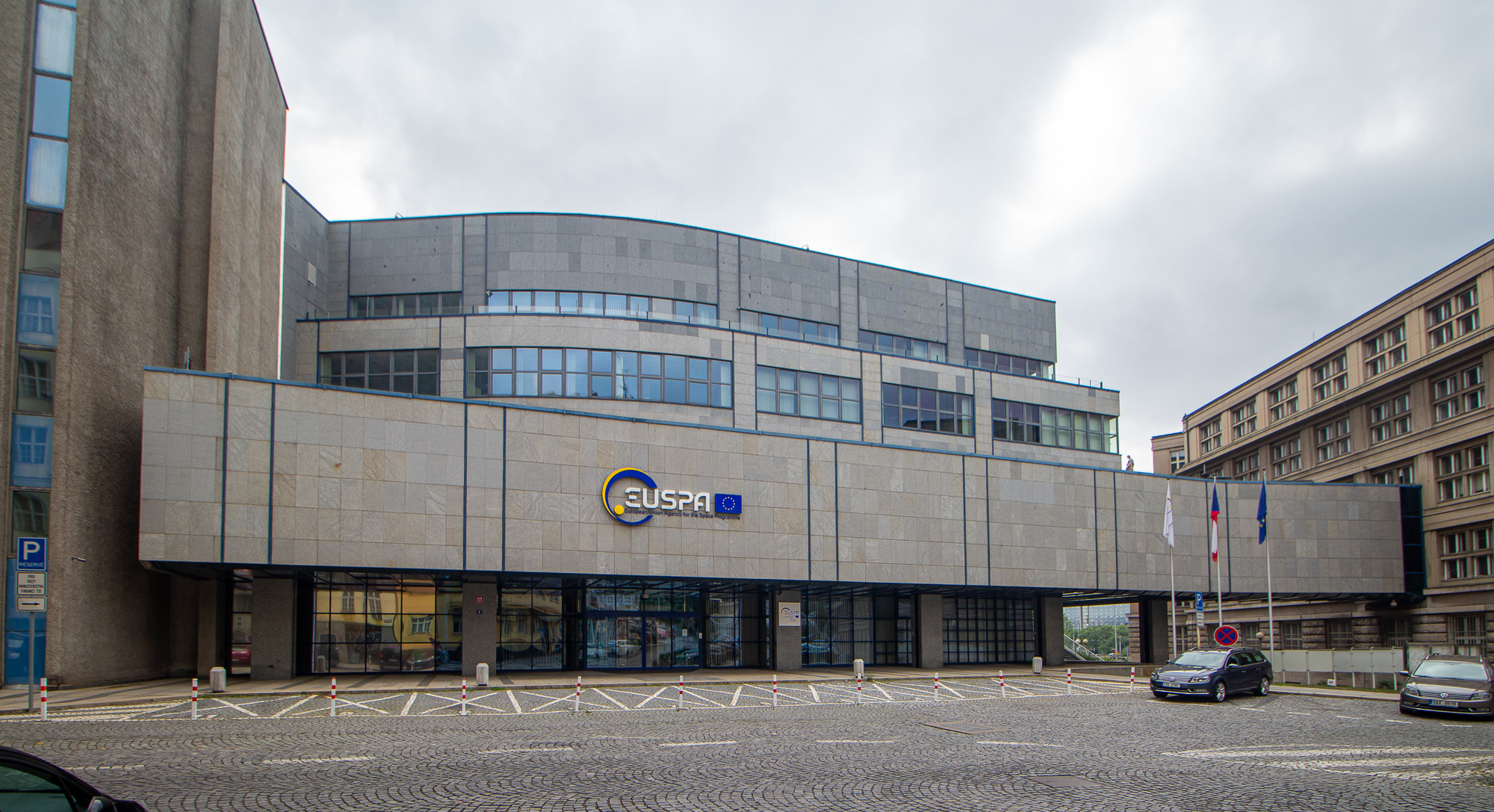
The headquarters of the EUSPA, which operates the Galileo system, in Prague

=== Main objectives ===
In 2008, the different concepts of the three main contributors of the European Space Agency (ESA) (Germany, France and Italy) for Galileo were compared and reduced to one by a joint team of engineers from all three countries. The first stage of the Galileo programme was agreed upon officially on 26 May 2003 by the European Union and the ESA. The system is intended primarily for civilian use, unlike the more military-focused systems of the United States (GPS), Russia (GLONASS) and China (BeiDou) in that Galileo doesn't limit accuracy for non-military applications. The European system could be subject to shutdown for military purposes in extreme circumstances (such as an armed conflict). Italy and Germany led the development of the first generation of the Galileo programme, while France is playing a more prominent role in the development of the Galileo Second Generation (G2G).

=== Funding ===
The European Commission had some difficulty funding the project's next stage, after several allegedly "per annum" sales projection graphs for the project were exposed in November 2001 as "cumulative" projections, which for each year projected included all previous years of sales. The attention that was brought to this multi-billion euro growing error in sales forecasts resulted in a general awareness in the commission and elsewhere that it was unlikely that the programme would yield the return on investment that had previously been suggested to investors and decision-makers. On 17 January 2002, a spokesman for the project stated that, as a result of US pressure and economic difficulties, "Galileo is almost dead".

A few months later, however, the situation changed dramatically. European Union member states decided it was important to have a satellite-based positioning and timing infrastructure that the US could not easily turn off in times of political conflict.

The European Union and the European Space Agency agreed in March 2002 to fund the project, pending a review in 2003 (which was completed on 26 May 2003). The starting cost for the period ending in 2005 is estimated at €1.1 billion. The required satellites (the planned number is 30) were to be launched between 2011 and 2014, with the system up and running and under civilian control from 2019. The final cost is estimated at €3 billion, including the infrastructure on Earth, constructed in 2006 and 2007. The plan was for private companies and investors to invest at least two-thirds of the cost of implementation, with the EU and ESA dividing the remaining cost. The base Open Service is to be available without charge to anyone with a Galileo-compatible receiver, with an encrypted higher-bandwidth improved-precision Commercial Service originally planned to be available at a cost, but in February 2018 the high accuracy service (HAS) (providing Precise Point Positioning data on the E6 frequency) was agreed to be made freely available, with the authentication service remaining commercial. By early 2011 costs for the project had run 50% over initial estimates.

=== Tension with the United States ===
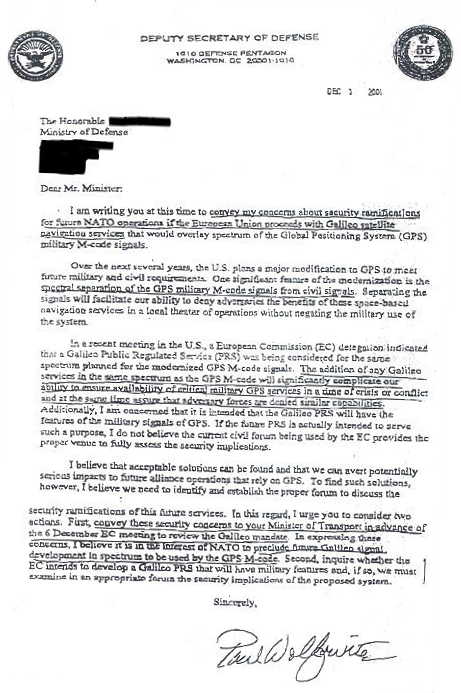
A December 2001 letter from US Deputy Secretary of Defense Paul Wolfowitz to the Ministers of the EU states, pointing out possible compatibility issues

Galileo is intended to be an EU civilian GNSS that allows all users access to it. Initially GPS reserved the highest quality signal for military use, and the signal available for civilian use was intentionally degraded (Selective Availability). This changed with President Bill Clinton signing a policy directive in 1996 to turn off Selective Availability. Since May 2000 the same precision signal has been provided to both civilians and the military.

Since Galileo was designed to provide the highest possible precision (greater than GPS) to anyone, the US was concerned that an enemy could use Galileo signals in military strikes against the US and its allies (some weapons like missiles use GNSSs for guidance). The frequency initially chosen for Galileo would have made it impossible for the US to block the Galileo signals without also interfering with its own GPS signals. The US did not want to lose their GNSS capability with GPS while denying enemies the use of GNSS. Some US officials became especially concerned when Chinese interest in Galileo was reported.

An anonymous EU official claimed that the US officials implied that they might consider shooting down Galileo satellites in the event of a major conflict in which Galileo was used in attacks against American forces.The EU's stance is that Galileo is a neutral technology, available to all countries and everyone. At first, EU officials did not want to change their original plans for Galileo, but they have since reached the compromise that Galileo is to use different frequencies. This allows the blocking or jamming of either GNSS without affecting the other.

==== GPS and Galileo ====
Clickable image, highlighting medium altitude orbits around Earth, (Note: Orbital periods and speeds are calculated using the relations 4π^{2}R^{3} = T^{2}GM and V^{2}R = GM, where R is the radius of orbit in metres; T is the orbital period in seconds; V is the orbital speed in m/s; G is the gravitational constant, approximately 6.673×10^{−11} Nm^{2}/kg^{2}; M is the mass of Earth, approximately 5.98×10^{24} kg (1.318×10^{25} lb).) from Low Earth to the lowest High Earth orbit (geostationary orbit and its graveyard orbit, at one ninth of the Moon's orbital distance), (Note: Approximately 8.6 times when the Moon is nearest (that is, (363,104 km)/(42,164 km)), to 9.6 times when the Moon is farthest (that is, (405,696 km)/(42,164 km))) with the Van Allen radiation belts and the Earth to scale

One of the reasons given for developing Galileo as an independent system was that position information from GPS can be made significantly inaccurate by the deliberate application of universal selective availability (SA) by the US military. GPS is widely used worldwide for civilian applications; Galileo's proponents argued that civil infrastructure, including aircraft navigation and landing, should not rely solely upon a system with this vulnerability.

On 2 May 2000, the selective availability was disabled by the President of the United States, Bill Clinton; in late 2001 the entity managing the GPS confirmed that it did not intend to enable selective availability ever again. Although Selective Availability capability still exists, on 19 September 2007, the US Department of Defense announced that newer GPS satellites would not be capable of implementing Selective Availability; the wave of Block IIF satellites launched in 2009, and all subsequent GPS satellites, are stated not to support selective availability. Selective availability thus becomes moot as a practical option as old satellites are replaced in the GPS Block III programme, and eventually nonexistant. The modernisation programme also contains standardised features that allow GPS III and Galileo systems to inter-operate, allowing receivers to be developed to utilise GPS and Galileo together to create an even more accurate GNSS.

=== Cooperation with the United States ===
In June 2004, in a signed agreement with the United States, the European Union agreed to switch to a binary offset carrier modulation 1.1, or BOC(1,1), allowing the coexistence of both GPS and Galileo and the future combined use of both systems. The European Union also agreed to address the "mutual concerns related to the protection of allied and US national security capabilities".

=== First experimental satellites: GIOVE-A and GIOVE-B ===
The first experimental satellite, GIOVE-A, was launched in December 2005 and was followed by a second test satellite, GIOVE-B, launched in April 2008. After successful completion of the In-Orbit Validation (IOV) phase, additional satellites were launched. On 30 November 2007, the 27 EU transport ministers involved reached an agreement that Galileo should be operational by 2013, but later press releases suggest it was delayed to 2014.

=== Continued funding and governance issues ===
In mid-2006, the public–private partnership fell apart, and the European Commission decided to nationalise the Galileo programme.

In early 2007, the EU had yet to decide how to pay for the system and the project was said to be "in deep crisis" due to a lack of additional public funds. German Transport Minister Wolfgang Tiefensee was particularly doubtful about the consortium's ability to end the infighting at a time when only one testbed satellite had been successfully launched.

Although a decision was yet to be reached, on 13 July 2007 EU countries discussed cutting €548 million (US$755 million, £370 million) from the union's competitiveness budget for the following year and shifting some of these funds to other parts of the financing pot, a move that could meet part of the cost of the union's Galileo satellite navigation system. European Union research and development projects could be scrapped to overcome a funding shortfall.

In November 2007, it was agreed to reallocate funds from the EU's agriculture and administration budgets and to soften the tendering process in order to invite more EU companies.

In April 2008, the EU transport ministers approved the Galileo Implementation Regulation. This allowed the €3.4 billion to be released from the EU's agriculture and administration budgets to allow the issuing of contracts to start construction of the ground station and the satellites.

In June 2009, the European Court of Auditors published a report, pointing out governance issues, substantial delays and budget overruns that led to project stalling in 2007, leading to further delays and failures.

In October 2009, the European Commission cut the number of satellites definitively planned from 28 to 22, with plans to order the remaining six at a later time. It also announced that the first OS, PRS and SoL signal would be available in 2013, and the CS and SOL some time later. The €3.4 billion budget for the 2006–2013 period was considered insufficient. In 2010, the think-tank Open Europe estimated the total cost of Galileo from start to 20 years after completion at €22.2 billion, borne entirely by taxpayers. Under the original estimates made in 2000, this cost would have been €7.7 billion, with €2.6 billion borne by taxpayers and the rest by private investors.

In November 2009, a ground station for Galileo was inaugurated near Kourou (French Guiana). The launch of the first four in-orbit validation (IOV) satellites was planned for the second half of 2011, and the launch of full operational capability (FOC) satellites was planned to start in late 2012.

In March 2010, it was verified that the budget for Galileo would only be available to provide the 4 IOV and 14 FOC satellites by 2014, with no funds then committed to bring the constellation above this 60% capacity. Paul Verhoef, the satellite navigation program manager at the European Commission, indicated that this limited funding would have serious consequences commenting at one point "To give you an idea, that would mean that for three weeks in the year you will not have satellite navigation" in reference to the proposed 18-vehicle constellation.

In July 2010, the European Commission estimated further delays and additional costs of the project to grow up to €1.5–1.7 billion, and moved the estimated date of completion to 2018. After completion the system will need to be subsidised by governments at €750 million per year. An additional €1.9 billion was planned to be spent bringing the system up to the full complement of 30 satellites (27 operational + 3 active spares).

In December 2010, EU ministers in Brussels voted Prague, in the Czech Republic, as the headquarters of the Galileo project.

In January 2011, infrastructure costs up to 2020 were estimated at €5.3 billion. In that same month, Wikileaks revealed that Berry Smutny, the CEO of the German satellite company OHB-System, said that Galileo "is a stupid idea that primarily serves French interests". The BBC learned in 2011 that €500 million (£440 million) would become available to make the extra purchase, taking Galileo within a few years from 18 operational satellites to 24.

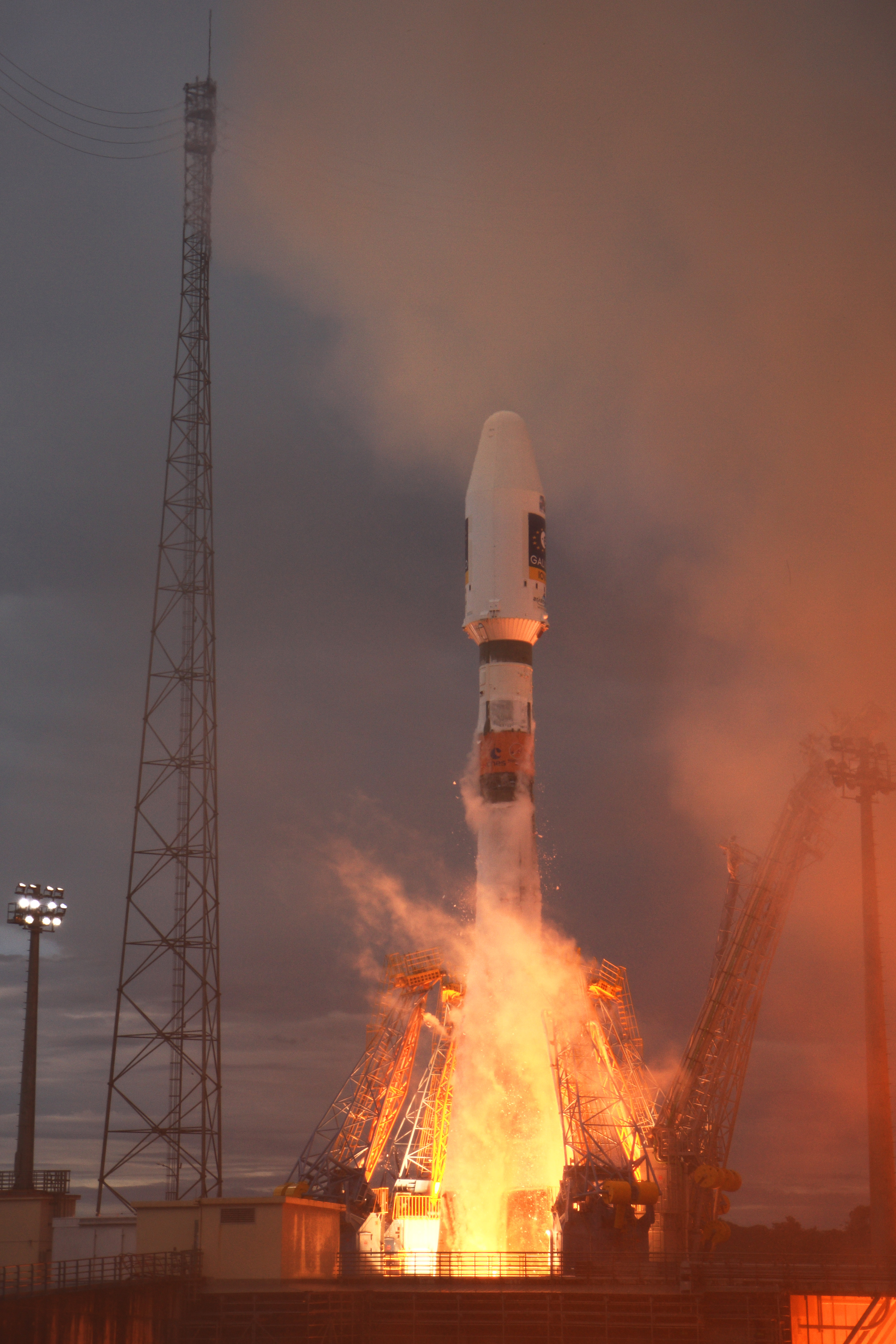
Galileo launch on a Soyuz rocket on 21 October 2011

The first two Galileo In-Orbit Validation satellites were launched by Soyuz ST-B flown from Centre Spatial Guyanais on 21 October 2011, and the remaining two on 12 October 2012. As of 2017, the satellites are fully useful for precise positioning and geodesy with a limited usability in navigation.

Twenty-two further satellites with Full Operational Capability (FOC) were on order as of 1 January 2018. The first four pairs of satellites were launched on 22 August 2014, 27 March 2015, 11 September 2015 and 17 December 2015.

== Clock failures ==
In January 2017, news agencies reported that six of the passive hydrogen masers (PHM) and three of the rubidium atomic clocks (RAFS) had failed; four of the full operational satellites had each lost at least one clock, but no satellite had lost more than two. The operation was not affected as each satellite is launched with four clocks (2 PHM and 2 RAFS). SpectraTime, the Swiss producer of both on-board clock types, declined to comment. According to the European Space Agency, they concluded with their industrial partners for the rubidium atomic clocks that some implemented testing and operational measures were required. Additionally some refurbishment is required for the rubidium atomic clocks that still have to be launched. For the passive hydrogen masers operational measures are being studied to reduce the risk of failure. China and India use the same SpectraTime-built atomic clocks in their satellite navigation systems. ESA contacted the Indian Space Research Organisation (ISRO) who initially reported not having experienced similar failures. However, at the end of January 2017, Indian news outlets reported that all three clocks aboard the IRNSS-1A satellite (launched in July 2013 with a 10-year life expectancy) had failed and that a replacement satellite would be launched in the second half of 2017: these atomic clocks were said to be supplied under a four-million-euro deal.

In July 2017, the European Commission reported that the main causes of the malfunctions have been identified and measures have been put in place to reduce the possibility of further malfunctions of the satellites already in space. According to European sources, ESA took measures to correct both identified sets of problems by replacing a faulty component that can cause a short circuit in the rubidium clocks and improve the passive hydrogen maser clocks as well on satellites still to be launched.

=== Outages ===
Between 11 July and 18 July 2019, the whole constellation experienced an "unexplained" signal outage with all active satellites showing "NOT USABLE" status on the Galileo status page. The cause of the incident was an equipment malfunction in the Galileo ground infrastructure that affected the calculation of time and orbit predictions.

On 14 December 2020, starting at 0:00 UTC, Galileo experienced a system-wide performance degradation lasting for 6 hours. GNSS receivers ignoring a 'marginal' status flag in the Galileo data could have experienced a pseudorange error of up to almost 80 km. The problem was related to an abnormal behaviour of a ground segment atomic clock in the time determination function of the system. The system uses parallel functioning Precise Timing Facilities in the Fucino and Oberpfaffenhofen Galileo Control Centres, and an issue occurred in Fucino whilst maintenance was performed on the parallel system in Oberpfaffenhofen.

== International involvement ==
In September 2003, China joined the Galileo project. China was to invest €230 million (US$302 million, £155 million, CNY 2.34 billion) in the project over the following years.

In July 2004, Israel signed an agreement with the EU to become a partner in the Galileo project.

On 3 June 2005, the European Union and Ukraine signed an agreement for Ukraine to join the project. In November 2005, Morocco also joined the programme.

In September 2005, India signed an agreement with the EU to join the project.

In mid-2006, the public–private partnership fell apart and the European Commission decided to nationalise Galileo as an EU programme. In November 2006, China opted instead to upgrade the BeiDou navigation system, its then-regional satellite navigation system. The decision was due to security concerns and issues with Galileo financing.

On 30 November 2007, the 27 member states of the European Union unanimously agreed to move forward with the project, with plans for bases in Germany and Italy. Spain did not approve during the initial vote, but approved it later that day. This greatly improved the viability of the Galileo project: "The EU's executive had previously said that if agreement was not reached by January 2008, the long-troubled project would essentially be dead".

On 3 April 2009, Norway too joined the programme pledging €68.9 million toward development costs and allowing its companies to bid for the construction contracts. Norway, while not a member of the EU, is a member of the ESA.

On 18 December 2013, Switzerland signed a cooperation agreement to fully participate in the program, and retroactively contributed €80 million for the period 2008–2013. As a member of the ESA, it already collaborated in the development of the Galileo satellites, contributing the hydrogen-maser clocks. Switzerland's financial commitment for the period 2014–2020 will be calculated in accordance with the standard formula applied for the Swiss participation in the EU research Framework Programme.

In March 2018, the European Commission announced that the United Kingdom may be excluded from parts of the project (especially relating to the secured service (PRS) following its exit from the European Union (EU). As a result, Airbus was to relocate work on the Ground Control Segment (GCS) from its Portsmouth premises to an EU state. British officials have been reported to be seeking legal advice on whether they can reclaim the €1.4 billion invested by the United Kingdom, of the €10 billion spent to date. In a speech at the EU Institute for Security Studies conference, the EU Chief Negotiator in charge of the Brexit negotiations, Michel Barnier, stressed the EU position that the UK had decided to leave the EU and thus all EU programmes, including Galileo. In August 2018, the UK stated that it would look into creating a competing satellite navigation system to Galileo post-Brexit. In December 2018, British Prime Minister Theresa May announced that the UK would no longer seek to reclaim the investment, and Science Minister Sam Gyimah resigned over the matter.

== System description ==
=== Space segment ===
Constellation visibility from a location on Earth's surface

As of 2012, the system was scheduled to have 15 satellites operational in 2015 and reach full operation in 2020 with the following specifications:

- 30 in-orbit spacecraft (24 in full service and 6 spares)
- Orbital altitude: 23,222 km (14,429 mi) (MEO)
- Orbital period: 14 hours and 5 minutes (every 17 revolutions, done in 10 sidereal days, a satellite passes over the same location)
- 3 orbital planes, 56.0° inclination, ascending nodes separated by 120.0° longitude (8 operational satellites and 2 active spares per orbital plane)
- Satellite lifetime: >12 years
- Satellite mass: 675 kg (1,488 lb)
- Satellite body dimensions: 2.7 m × 1.2 m × 1.1 m (8 ft 10 in × 3 ft 11 in × 3 ft 7 in)
- Span of solar arrays: 18.7 m (61 ft)
- Power of solar arrays: 1.5 kW (end of life)
- Power of navigation antennas: 155–265 W

=== Ground segment ===
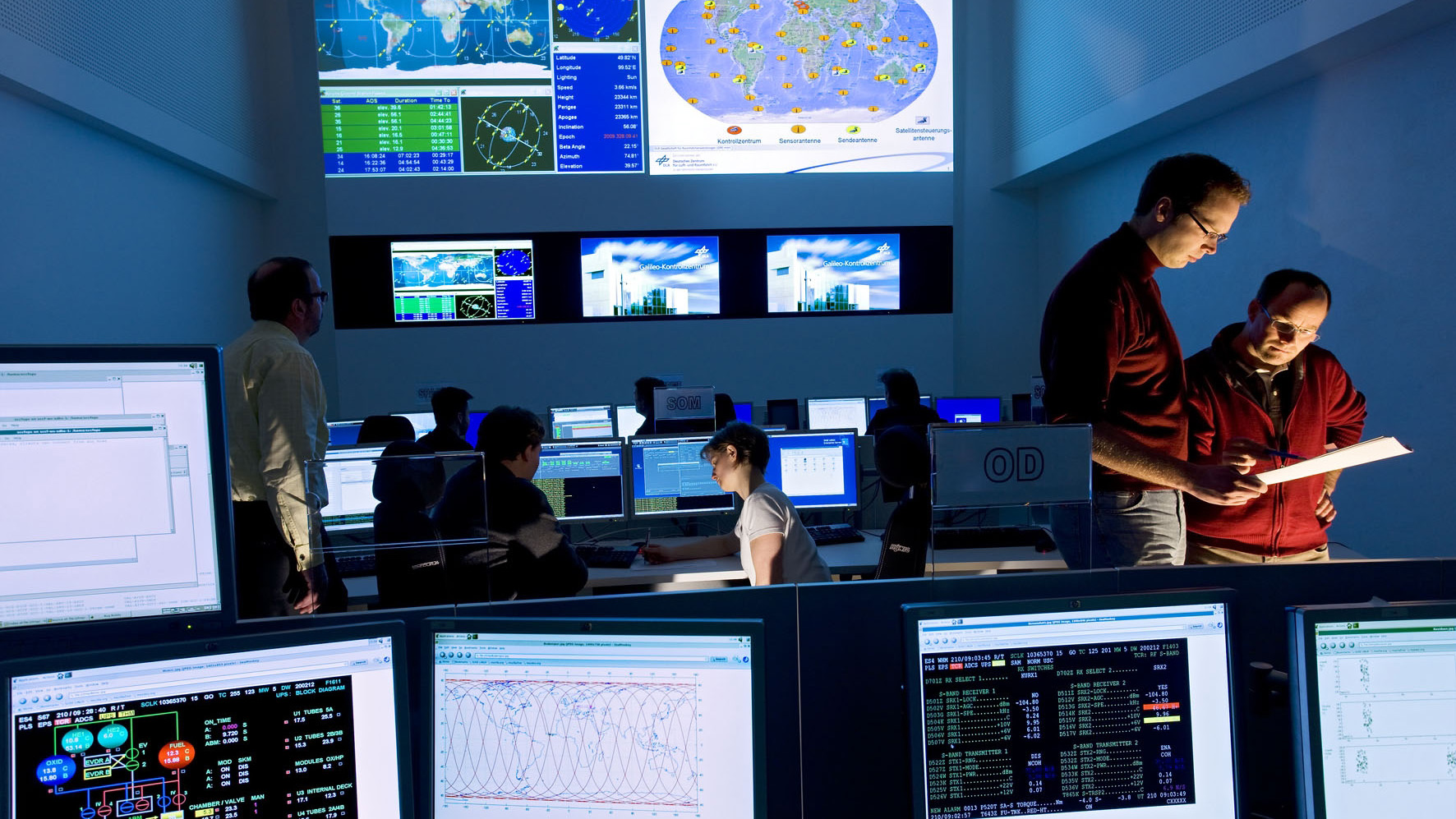
Galileo Control Centre at the DLR Oberpfaffenhofen site

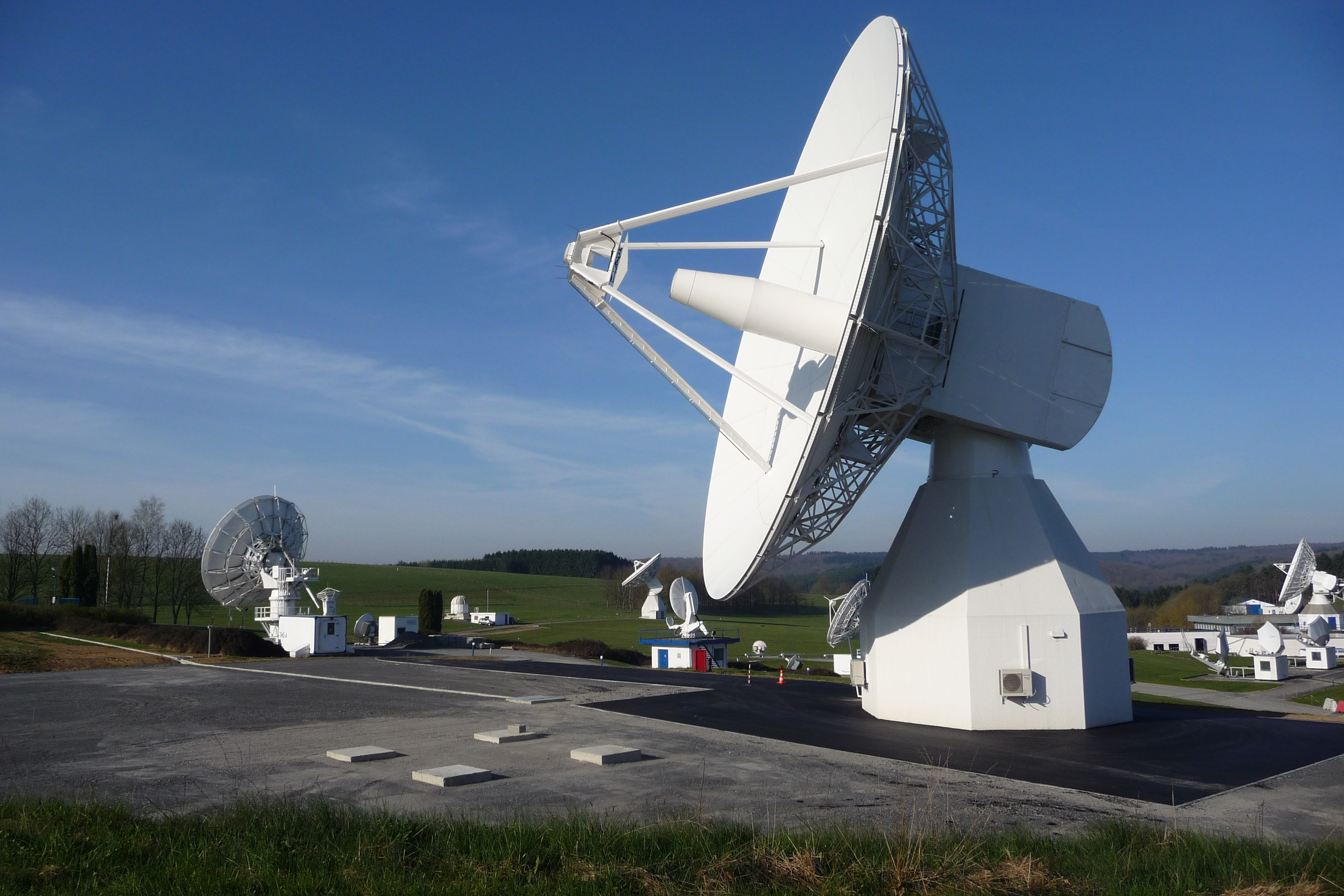
Galileo In-Orbit Test (IOT) L-band (1,000 – 2,000 MHz) antenna at ESTRACK Redu Station

The system's orbit and signal accuracy is controlled by a ground segment consisting of:

- Two ground control centres, located in Oberpfaffenhofen and Fucino for Satellite and Mission Control
- Seven telemetry, tracking & control (TT&C) stations, located in Kiruna, 2x Kourou, Nouméa, Réunion, Redu and Papeete
- Ten mission data uplink stations (ULS), two per site, located in Svalbard, Kourou, Papeete, Sainte-Marie, Réunion and Nouméa
- Several worldwide distributed reference sensor stations (GSS), including one in the Kerguelen Islands and Saint Pierre and Miquelon
- A data dissemination network between all geographically distributed locations
- One service centre, located in Madrid, to help Galileo users.

=== Signals ===
The system transmits three signals: E1 (1575.42 MHz), E5 (1191.795 MHz) consisting of E5a (1176.45 MHz) and E5b (1207.14 MHz), and E6 (1278.75 MHz):

Galileo FOC signals
Parameters	E1-I	E1-Q	E5a	E5b	E6-I	E6-Q
Carrier frequency (MHz)	1,575.42	1,575.42	1,176.45	1,207.14	1,278.75	1,278.75
Modulation	CBOC (6, 1, 1/11)	BOCcos (15, 2.5)	AltBOC (15, 10)	AltBOC (15, 10)	BPSK (5)	BOCcos (10, 5)

To improve the performance of the Galileo Open Service, the E5 Quasi-Pilot signal component was introduced November 2025. The primary objective is a faster Time to First Fix, improved typically by factor 3.

=== Services ===
The Galileo system will have four main services:

Open Service (OS)
This will be available without charge for use by anyone with appropriate mass-market equipment; simple timing, and positioning down to 1 m – for a double frequency receiver, best case.

High Accuracy Service (HAS)
Accuracy to 20 cm free of charge (resulting from the re-scope of the former Galileo Commercial Service).

Public Regulated Service (PRS)
Designed to be more robust, with anti-jamming mechanisms and reliable problem detection. It's encrypted and limited to authorized governmental bodies.

Search and Rescue Service (SAR)
The Galileo SAR Service is a Medium Earth Orbiting Search and Rescue (MEOSAR) service and part of the International Cospas-Sarsat Programme.

==== Quarterly Service Performance Reports ====
The European GNSS Service Centre provides public quarterly performance reports regarding the Open Service and Search and Rescue Service since 2017. Generally, the reported performance parameters measurements surpass the target values. The Galileo April, May, June 2021 Quarterly Open Service Performance Report by the European GNSS Service Centre reported the UTC Time Dissemination Service Accuracy was ≤ 4.3 nanoseconds, computed by accumulating samples over the previous 12 months and exceeding the ≤ 30 ns target value. The Signal In Space Error (SISE) was also well within the ≤ 2 m (6 ft 7 in) target value for Single and (more accurate) Dual Frequency receivers. The Galileo navigation message includes the differences between Galileo System Time (GST), UTC and GPS Time (GPST) (to promote interoperability). The Galileo April, May, June 2021 Quarterly Search and Rescue Service Performance Report by the European GNSS Service Centre reported the various performance parameters measurements surpassed their target values.

=== Concept ===
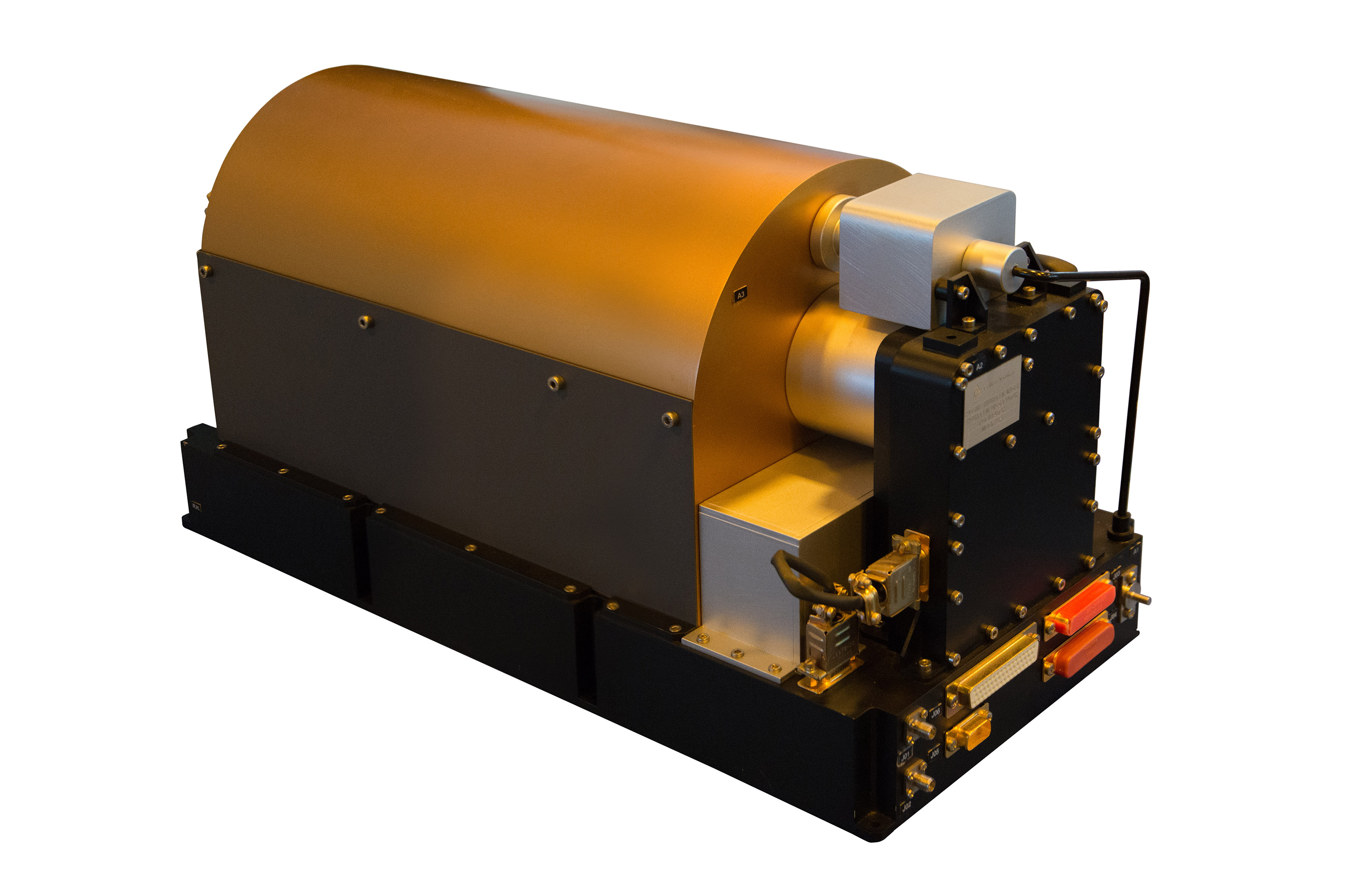
Passive hydrogen maser used in Galileo satellites as a master clock for an onboard timing system

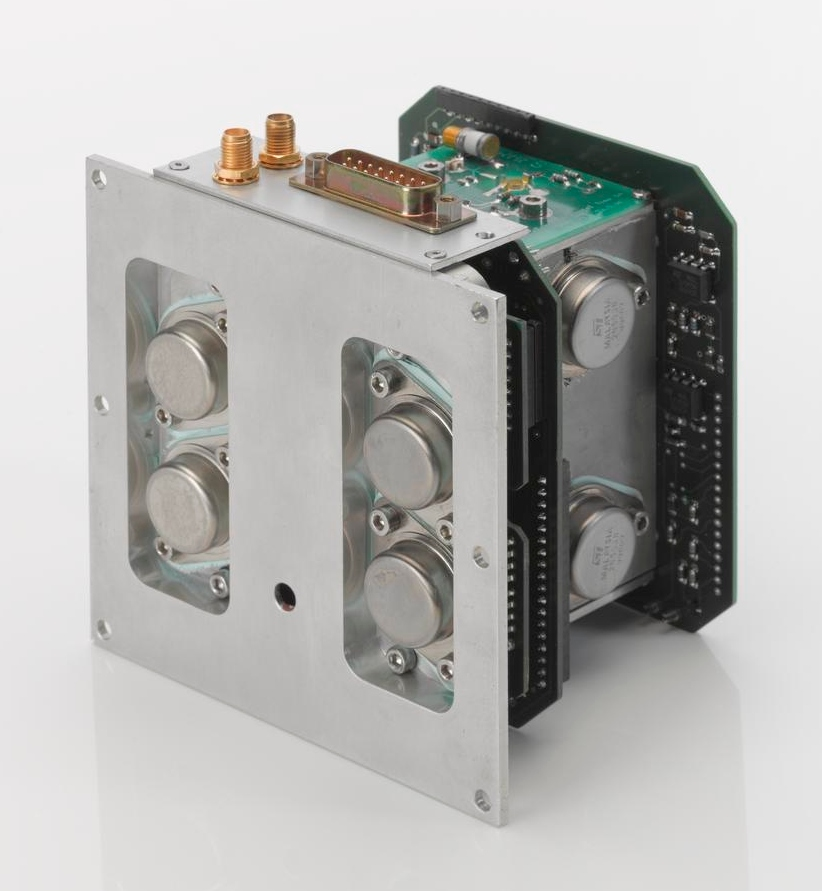
Prototype rubidium atomic clock for a Galileo satellite made in 2002

Each Galileo satellite has two master passive hydrogen maser atomic clocks and two secondary rubidium atomic clocks which are independent of one other. As precise and stable space-qualified atomic clocks are critical components to any satellite-navigation system, the employed quadruple redundancy keeps Galileo functioning when onboard atomic clocks fail in space. The onboard passive hydrogen maser clocks are four times more precise than the onboard rubidium atomic clocks, with an estimated drift of just one second every three million years. A timing error of just 1 nanosecond would correspond to a positional error of 30 cm on Earth's surface. These clocks provide the accurate timing signals necessary for calculating signal travel time to the receiver. The Galileo satellites are configured to run one hydrogen maser clock in primary mode and a rubidium clock as hot backup. Under normal conditions, the operating hydrogen maser clock produces the reference frequency from which the navigation signal is generated. Should the hydrogen maser encounter any problem, an instantaneous switchover to the rubidium clock would be performed. In case of a failure of the primary hydrogen maser the secondary hydrogen maser could be activated by the ground segment to take over within a period of days as part of the redundant system. A clock monitoring and control unit provides the interface between the four clocks and the navigation signal generator unit (NSU). It passes the signal from the active hydrogen master clock to the NSU and also ensures that the frequencies produced by the master clock and the active spare are in phase, so that the spare can take over instantly should the master clock fail. The NSU information is used to calculate the position of the receiver by trilaterating the difference in received signals from multiple satellites.

The onboard passive hydrogen maser and rubidium clocks are very stable over a few hours. If they were left to run indefinitely, though, their timekeeping would drift, so they need to be synchronized regularly with a network of even more stable ground-based reference clocks. These include active hydrogen maser clocks and clocks based on the caesium frequency standard, which show a far better medium and long-term stability than rubidium or passive hydrogen maser clocks. These clocks on the ground are gathered together within the parallel functioning Precise Timing Facilities in the Fucino and Oberpfaffenhofen Galileo Control Centres. The ground based clocks also generate a worldwide time reference called Galileo System Time (GST), the standard for the Galileo system and are routinely compared to the local realisations of UTC, the UTC(k) of the European frequency and time laboratories.

For more information of the concept of global satellite navigation systems, see GNSS and GNSS positioning calculation.

== European GNSS Service Centre ==
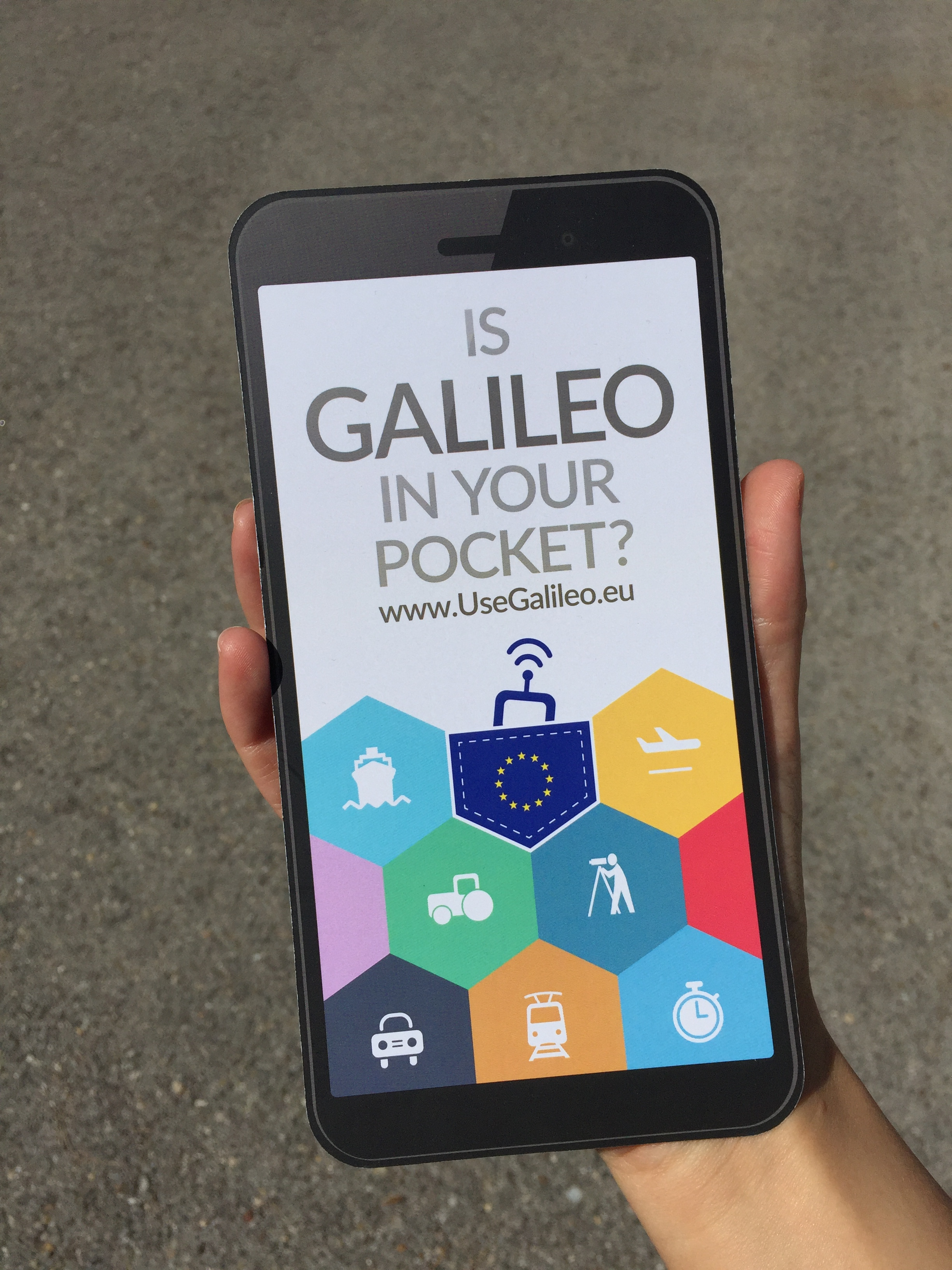
The European GNSS Service Centre is the point of contact for Galileo users' assistance.

The European GNSS Service Centre (GSC), located in Madrid, is an integral part of Galileo and provides the single interface between the Galileo system and Galileo users. GSC publishes Galileo official documentation, promotes Galileo current and future services worldwide, supports standardisation and distributes Galileo almanacs, ephemeris and metadata.

The GSC User Helpdesk is the point of contact for Galileo user's assistance. GSC answers queries and gathers incident notifications from users on Galileo. The helpdesk is continuously available for all worldwide Galileo users through the GSC web portal.

GSC provides updated Galileo constellation status and informs on planned and unplanned events through Notice Advisory to Galileo Users (NAGU). GSC publishes Galileo reference documentation and general information on Galileo services and signals description and Galileo performance reports.

== Search and rescue ==
Galileo provides a global search and rescue (SAR) function as part of the MEOSAR system. Like Russia's Glonass, the United States' Global Positioning System (GPS) satellites, and some Chinese BeiDou satellites, Galileo satellites are equipped with a transponder which relays 406 MHz distress frequency signals from emergency beacons by a Forward Link Service (FLS) to the Rescue coordination centre, which will then initiate a rescue operation. After receipt of an emergency beacon signal, the Galileo SAR system provides a signal, the Return Link Message (RLM), to the emergency beacon, informing the person(s) in distress that the activated beacon has been detected and help is on the way. This return message feature is new in a satellite constellation and is considered a major upgrade compared to the existing Cospas-Sarsat system, which up to then did not provide feedback to the user. Tests in February 2014 found that for Galileo's search and rescue function, operating as part of the existing International Cospas-Sarsat Programme, 77% of simulated distress locations can be pinpointed within 2 kilometres (1.2 mi), and 95% within 5 kilometres (3.1 mi). The Galileo Return Link Service (RLS) went live in January 2020 for all RLS capable emergency beacons.

== Constellation ==
Summary of satellites, as of October 2026
Block	Launches		Status		
Block	Success	Failure	Operational	Not usable	Retired
IOV	4	0	3	0	1
FOC	28	2 (Note: Deployed into wrong orbit, never used operationally)	25	4	1
G2G	0	0	0	0	0
Total	32	2	28	4	2

=== Galileo satellite test beds: GIOVE ===
GIOVE-A was successfully launched 28 December 2005.

In 2004, the Galileo System Test Bed Version 1 (GSTB-V1) project validated the on-ground algorithms for Orbit Determination and Time Synchronisation (OD&TS). This project, led by ESA and European Satellite Navigation Industries, has provided industry with fundamental knowledge to develop the mission segment of the Galileo positioning system.

- GIOVE-A is the first GIOVE (Galileo In-Orbit Validation Element) test satellite. It was built by Surrey Satellite Technology Ltd (SSTL), and successfully launched on 28 December 2005 by the European Space Agency and the Galileo Joint Undertaking (GJU). Operation of GIOVE-A ensured that Galileo meets the frequency-filing allocation and reservation requirements for the International Telecommunication Union (ITU), a process that was required to be complete by June 2006.
- GIOVE-B, built by Astrium and Thales Alenia Space, has a more advanced payload than GIOVE-A. It was successfully launched on 27 April 2008 at 22:16 UTC aboard a Soyuz-FG/Fregat rocket provided by Starsem.

A third satellite, GIOVE-A2, was originally planned to be built by SSTL for launch in the second half of 2008. Construction of GIOVE-A2 was terminated due to the successful launch and in-orbit operation of GIOVE-B.

The GIOVE Mission segment operated by European Satellite Navigation Industries used the GIOVE-A/B satellites to provide experimental results based on real data to be used for risk mitigation for the IOV satellites that followed on from the testbeds. ESA organised the global network of ground stations to collect the measurements of GIOVE-A/B with the use of the GETR receivers for further systematic study. GETR receivers are supplied by Septentrio as well as the first Galileo navigation receivers to be used to test the functioning of the system at further stages of its deployment. Signal analysis of GIOVE-A/B data confirmed successful operation of all the Galileo signals with the tracking performance as expected.

=== In-Orbit Validation (IOV) satellites ===
These testbed satellites were followed by four IOV Galileo satellites that are much closer to the final Galileo satellite design. The search and rescue (SAR) feature is also installed. The first two satellites were launched on 21 October 2011 from Centre Spatial Guyanais using a Soyuz launcher, the other two on 12 October 2012. This enables key validation tests, since earth-based receivers such as those in cars and phones need to "see" a minimum of four satellites in order to calculate their position in three dimensions. Those 4 IOV Galileo satellites were constructed by Astrium GmbH and Thales Alenia Space. On 12 March 2013, a first fix was performed using those four IOV satellites. Once this In-Orbit Validation (IOV) phase has been completed, the remaining satellites will be installed to reach the Full Operational Capability.

=== Full Operational Capability (FOC) satellites ===
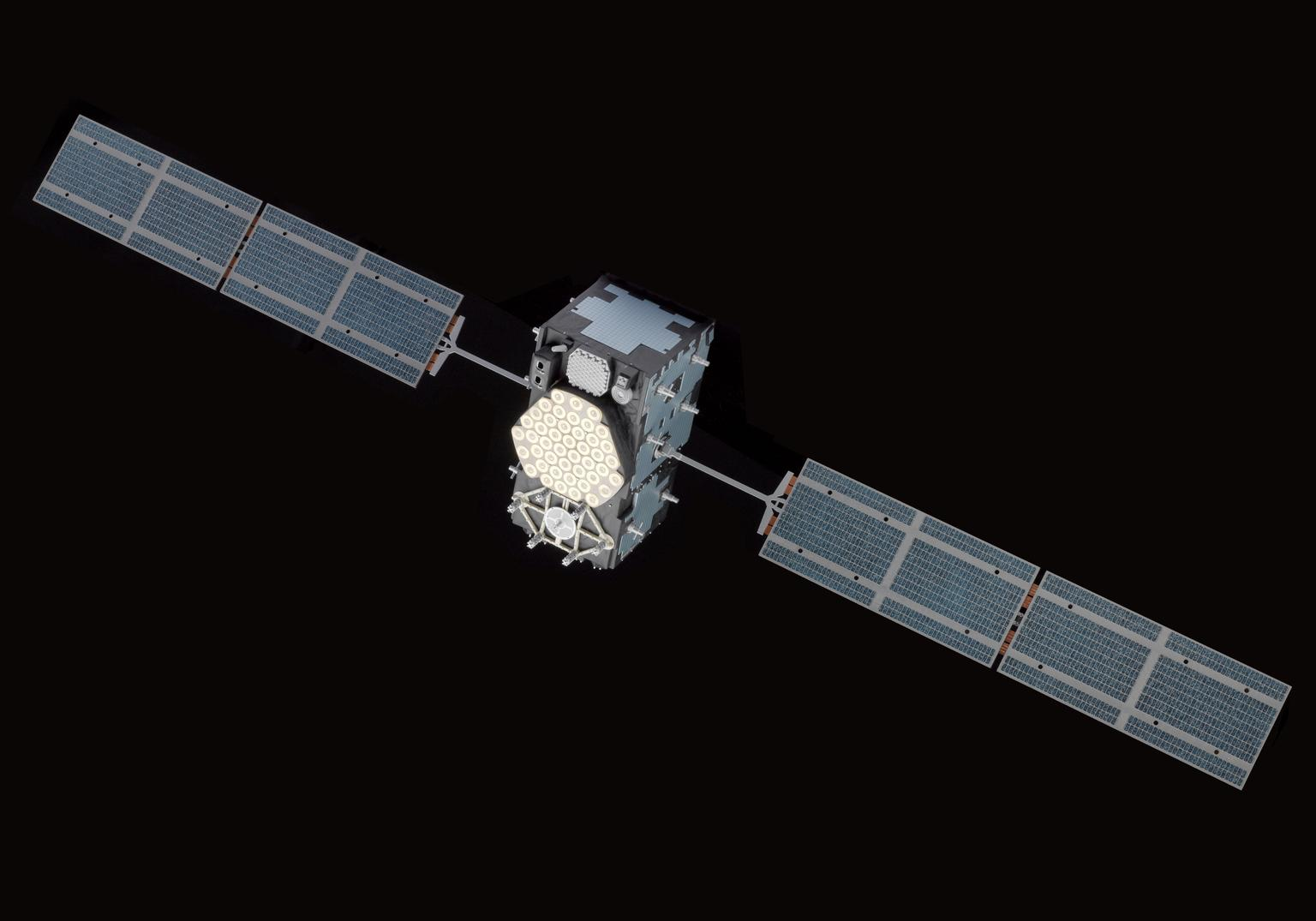
Model of a Galileo satellite

==== FOC Batch 1 ====
On 7 January 2010, it was announced that the contract to build the first 14 FOC satellites was awarded to OHB System and for the navigation payload to Surrey Satellite Technology Limited (SSTL). The first batch of Galileo First Generation satellites known as "Batch-1" consists of the Galileo-FOC FM1 to Galileo-FOC FM14 satellites. Fourteen satellites were built at a cost of €566 million (£510 million; US$811 million). Arianespace will launch the satellites for a cost of €397 million (£358 million; US$569 million). The European Commission also announced that the €85 million contract for system support covering industrial services required by ESA for integration and validation of the Galileo system had been awarded to Thales Alenia Space. Thales Alenia Space subcontract performances to Astrium GmbH and security to Thales Communications.

==== FOC Batch 2 ====
In February 2012, an additional order of 8 FOC satellites was awarded to OHB Systems for €250 million (US$327 million), after outbidding EADS Astrium tender offer. The second batch of Galileo First Generation satellites known as "Batch-2" consists of the Galileo-FOC FM15 to Galileo-FOC FM22 satellites. Thus bringing the total to 22 FOC satellites. The satellites were built by OHB, with the contribution of Surrey Satellite Technology (SSTL).

==== FOC Batch 3 ====
In June and October 2017, two additional orders for 8 and 4 FOC satellites were awarded to OHB Systems for €324 million and €157.75 million. This third and final batch of Galileo First Generation satellites known as "Batch-3" consists of the Galileo-FOC FM23 to Galileo-FOC FM34 satellites. The satellites are being built by OHB in Bremen, Germany, with the contribution of Surrey Satellite Technology (SSTL) in Guildford, United Kingdom. When completed Batch-3 brings the total to 34 FOC satellites.

==== FOC launches ====
On 7 May 2014, the first two FOC satellites landed in Guyana for their joint launch planned in summer. Originally planned for launch during 2013, problems tooling and establishing the production line for assembly led to a delay of a year in serial production of Galileo satellites. These two satellites (Galileo satellites GSAT-201 and GSAT-202) were launched on 22 August 2014. The names of these satellites are Doresa and Milena named after European children who had previously won a drawing contest. On 23 August 2014, launch service provider Arianespace announced that the flight VS09 experienced an anomaly and the satellites were injected into an incorrect orbit. They ended up in elliptical orbits and thus could not be used for navigation. However, it was later possible to use them to perform a physics experiment, so they were not a complete loss.

On 15 December 2016, Galileo started offering Initial Operational Capability (IOC). The services currently offered are Open Service, Public Regulated Service and Search and Rescue Service.

=== Second generation (G2G) satellites ===
During 2014, ESA and its industry partners began studies on Galileo Second Generation (G2G) satellites, which were to be presented to the EC for the late 2020s launch period. One idea was to employ electric propulsion, which would eliminate the need for an upper stage during launch and allow satellites from a single batch to be inserted into more than one orbital plane.

On 20 January 2021, the European Commission announced that it had awarded a €1.47 billion contract to Thales Alenia Space (TAS) and Airbus Defence and Space for six spacecraft by each manufacturer. The signing of the contracts to Thales Alenia Space and Airbus Defence and Space, scheduled on 29 January 2021, was suspended by the European Court of Justice following a protest filed by OHB SE, the losing bidder. The OHB protest at the ECJ's General Court is based on "allegations of theft of trade secrets", and seeks both a suspension of the contract signatures and the cancellation of the contract award. In May 2021 ESA reported it signed the contracts to design and build the first batch of Galileo Second Generation (G2G) satellites with Thales Alenia Space and Airbus Defence and Space.

The twelve G2G satellites will feature a fully digital navigational payload, electric propulsion, enhanced navigation signals and capabilities, inter-satellite links and reconfigurability in space. The number of atomic clocks will increase from four to six. The satellites' increase in payloads will result in a mass of approximately 2300 kg. The highly efficient but low thrust electric propulsion combined with the significantly increased mass will result in up to six months for G2G satellites to reach their orbits, up from the 10 weeks needed for the first generation.

The design life is extended from twelve to fifteen years. Six G2G satellites were in production as of May 2025.

== Applications and impact ==
=== Science projects using Galileo ===
In July 2006, an international consortium of universities and research institutions embarked on a study of potential scientific applications of the Galileo constellation. This project, named GEO6, is a broad study oriented to the general scientific community, aiming to define and implement new applications of Galileo.

Among the various GNSS users identified by the Galileo Joint Undertaking, the GEO6, project addresses the Scientific User Community (UC). The GEO6 project aims at fostering possible novel applications within the scientific UC of GNSS signals, and particularly of Galileo.

The AGILE project is an EU-funded project devoted to the study of the technical and commercial aspects of location-based services (LBS). It includes technical analysis of the benefits brought by Galileo (and EGNOS) and studies the hybridisation of Galileo with other positioning technologies (network-based, WLAN, etc.). Within these projects, some pilot prototypes were implemented and demonstrated.

On the basis of the potential number of users, potential revenues for Galileo Operating Company or Concessionaire (GOC), international relevance, and level of innovation, a set of Priority Applications (PA) will be selected by the consortium and developed within the time-frame of the same project. These applications will help to increase and optimise the use of the EGNOS services and the opportunities offered by the Galileo Signal Test-Bed (GSTB-V2) and the Galileo (IOV) phase.

All Galileo satellites are equipped with laser retroreflector arrays which allow them to be tracked by the stations of the International Laser Ranging Service. Satellite laser ranging to Galileo satellites are used for the validation of satellite orbits, determination of Earth rotation parameters and for the combined solutions incorporating laser and microwave observations.

=== Receivers ===
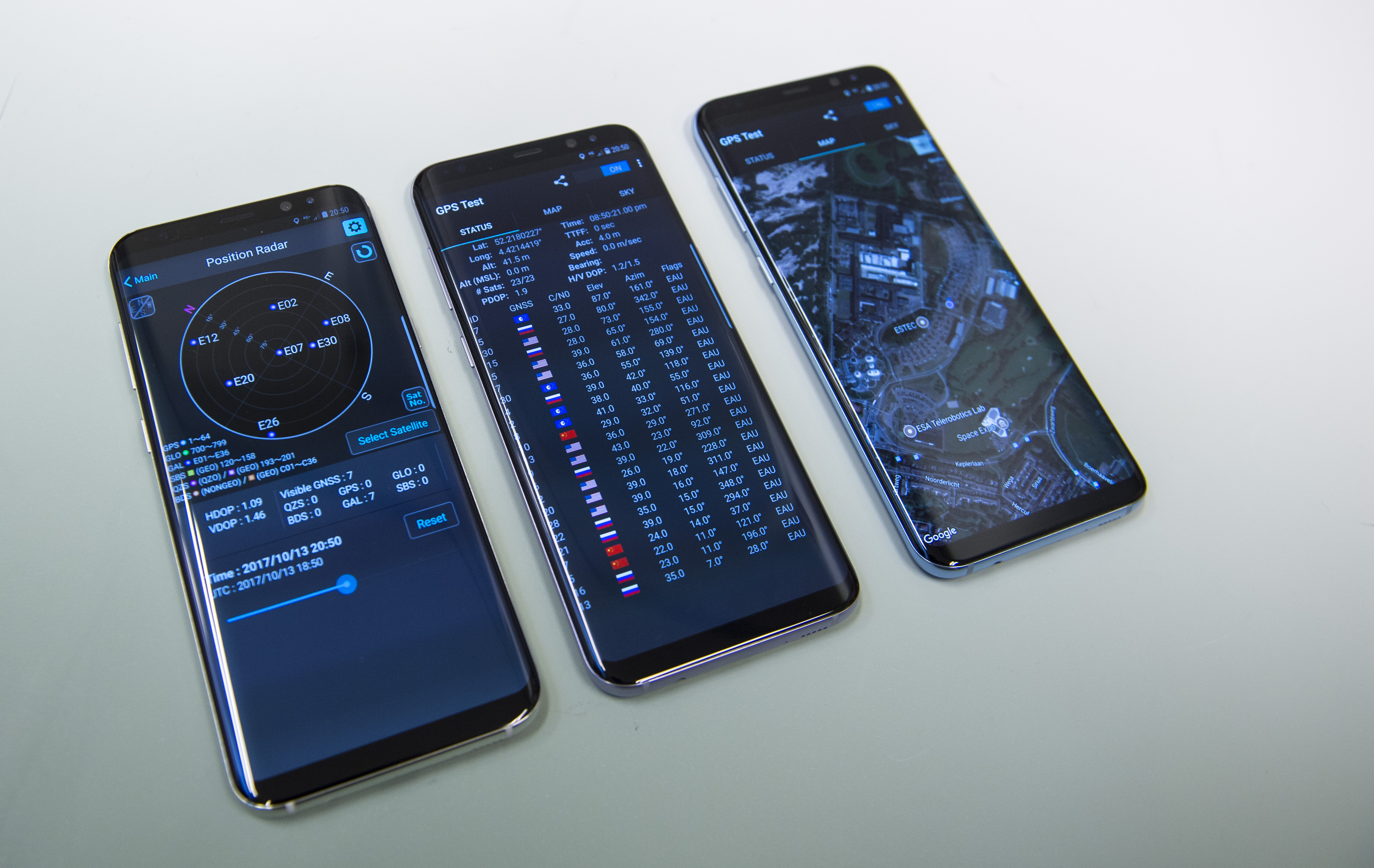
Samsung Galaxy S8+ smartphones receiving Galileo and other GNSS signals

All major GNSS receiver chips support Galileo and hundreds of end-user devices are compatible with Galileo. The first, dual-frequency-GNSS-capable Android devices, which track more than one radio signal from each satellite, E1 and E5a frequencies for Galileo, were the Huawei Mate 20 line, Xiaomi Mi 8, Xiaomi Mi 9 and Xiaomi Mi MIX 3. As of July 2019, there were more than 140 Galileo-enabled smartphones on the market of which 9 were dual-frequency enabled. An extensive list of enabled devices, for various uses, on land, sea and in air is frequently updated at the EU website. On 24 December 2018, the European Commission passed a mandate for all new smartphones to implement Galileo for E112 support.

Effective from 1 April 2018, all new vehicles sold in Europe must support eCall, an automatic emergency response system that dials 112 and transmits Galileo location data in the event of an accident.

Until late 2018, Galileo was not authorized for use in the United States and, as a consequence, only variably worked on devices that could receive Galileo signals within United States territory. The Federal Communications Commission's (FCC) position on the matter was that non-GPS radio navigation satellite systems (RNSS) receivers must be granted a licence to receive said signals. A waiver of this requirement for Galileo was requested by the EU and submitted in 2015, and on 6 January 2017, public comment on the matter was requested. On 15 November 2018, the FCC granted the requested waiver, explicitly allowing non-federal consumer devices to access Galileo E1 and E5 frequencies. However, most devices, including smartphones, still require operating system updates or similar updates to allow the use of Galileo signals within the United States (most smartphones since the Apple iPhone 6S and Samsung Galaxy S7 have the hardware capability, and simply require a software modification).

=== Coins ===
Austrian €25 European Satellite Navigation commemorative coin, back

The European Satellite Navigation project was selected as the main motif of a very high-value collectors' coin: the Austrian European Satellite Navigation commemorative coin, minted on 1 March 2006. The coin has a silver ring and gold-brown niobium "pill". In the reverse, the niobium portion depicts navigation satellites orbiting the Earth. The ring shows different modes of transport, for which satellite navigation was developed: an aircraft, a car, a lorry, a train and a container ship.

== See also ==
=== Other systems ===
- BeiDou – global navigation satellite system operated by China.
- GLONASS – global navigation satellite system operated by Russia.
- GPS – global navigation satellite system operated by the United States.
- NavIC – regional navigation satellite system operated by India, receivable in the South Asia and Western Asia regions.
- QZSS – regional navigation satellite system operated by Japan, receivable in the Asia-Oceania region.

=== Other ===
- List of Galileo satellites
- Commercialization of space
- European Geostationary Navigation Overlay Service
- Multiplexed binary offset carrier modulation – the modulation type chosen for Galileo Open Service signals and modernized GPS signals
- International Terrestrial Reference System and Frame – the coordinate system used by Galileo

== Bibliography ==
- The Galileo Project – Galileo Design consolidation, European Commission, 2003
- Guenter W. Hein, Jeremie Godet, et al.: Status of Galileo Frequency and Signal Design, Proc. ION GPS 2002.
- Dee Ann Divis: Military role for Galileo emerges. GPS World, May 2002, Vol. 13, No. 5, p. 10.
- Dr Richard North: Galileo – The Military and Political Dimensions. 2004.
- Jaizki Mendizabal; Roc Berenguer; Juan Melendez (2009). GPS and Galileo. McGraw Hill. ISBN 978-0-07-159869-9.
